= Revolutionary Governing Council (Hungary) =

Executive government of the Hungarian Soviet Republic

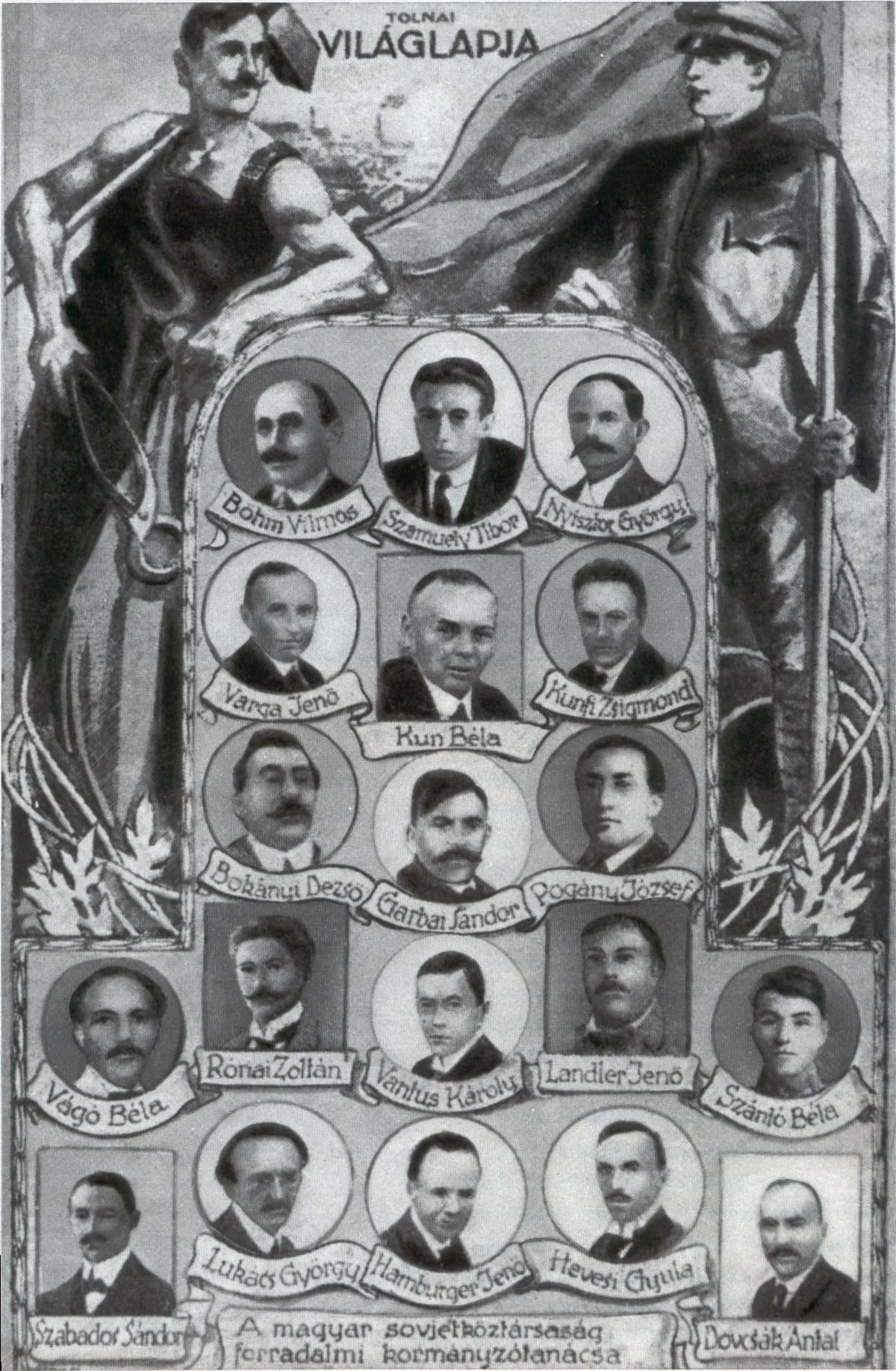
- The government's members upon its initial formation, March 1919
- Date formed: 21 March 1919
- Date dissolved: 1 August 1919

People and organisations
- CEC chairman: Sándor Garbai
- Prime Minister: Sándor Garbai
- Total no. of members: 35 (April–June)
- Member party: Hungarian Socialist Party
- Status in legislature: Single legal party

History
- Predecessor: Berinkey government
- Successor: Government of Szeged

The Revolutionary Governing Council (Hungarian: Forradalmi Kormányzótanács), also known as the Garbai government (Hungarian: Garbai-kormány) was the leading body and principal executive organ of the Hungarian Soviet Republic, effectively its government. It functioned from 21 March to 1 August 1919, and was chaired by Sándor Garbai. As the government of the Soviet Republic, it was also known as the Soviet Government (Hungarian: Tanácskormány).

The members of the Governing Council were called people's commissars. Until 3 April 1919, the people's commissars had deputies, but afterward, most of the commissariats were jointly led by several equal-ranking people's commissars, making the Revolutionary Governing Council the largest government in Hungarian history: from 7 April 1919 to 24 June 1919, it had 35 members.

== Members ==
The Revolutionary Governing Council initially had 15 members, grew to its largest size of 35 members, and had 13 members before its resignation. Most of the people's commissars were former Social Democratic politicians, while the rest were communists. The ruling party of the Soviet Republic was the Hungarian Socialist Party, formed from the merger of the Social Democratic Party of Hungary and the Hungarian Communist Party.

Among the members of the Governing Council, Béla Kun had the most authority, surpassing Sándor Garbai, who held the official chairmanship throughout.

=== March–April ===
The composition of the Revolutionary Governing Council until the issuance of the provisional constitution of the Soviet Republic (21 March 1919 – 3 April 1919):

- Chairman of the Revolutionary Governing Council: Sándor Garbai
- People's Commissar of the Interior: Jenő Landler, deputy Béla Vágó
- People's Commissars of Agriculture: Sándor Csizmadia, Károly Vántus, Jenő Hamburger, and György Nyisztor, deputy Ákos Hevesi (appointed before 30 March)
- People's Commissar of Military Affairs: József Pogány (until 2 April), deputies Béla Szántó and Tibor Szamuely
- People's Commissar of Justice: Zoltán Rónai, deputy István Ládai
- People's Commissar of Commerce: Jenő Landler temporarily as Interior Commissar, deputies Mátyás Rákosi and József Haubrich
- People's Commissar of Public Supply: Mór Erdélyi, deputy Artúr Illés
- People's Commissar of Public Education: Zsigmond Kunfi, deputies György Lukács and Sándor Szabados (from 28 March)
- People's Commissar of Foreign Affairs: Béla Kun, deputy Péter Ágoston
- People's Commissar of Labor and Public Welfare: Dezső Bokányi, deputies Rezső Fiedler and Antal Guth (from 28 March)
- German People's Commissar: Henrik Kalmár
- People's Commissar of Finance: Jenő Varga, deputy Béla Székely
- Ruthenian People's Commissar: Oreszt Szabó (did not actually take office), then Ágoston Stefán (from 24 March)
- People's Commissar of Socialization: Vilmos Böhm, deputies Gyula Hevesi and Antal Dovcsák

According to the 24 March 1919 issue of Budapesti Közlöny, Sándor Vincze, Mór Preusz, and László Dienes were appointed as city commissars, and Dezső Bíró and Ernő Seidler as political commissars. Gyula Lengyel became the governor of the Austro-Hungarian Bank.

There was no clear division of tasks between the people's commissars and their deputies; deputies often signed official documents as people's commissars. Transportation matters fell under the Interior Commissar's duties, and the agricultural commissariat was jointly led by four people's commissars, initially without a deputy, then with one deputy. József Pogány, the People's Commissar of Military Affairs, resigned on the evening of 2 April 1919 due to a demonstration against him.

=== April–June ===
Following the proclamation of the Soviet Republic's provisional constitution, the Revolutionary Governing Council reorganized itself. The deputy commissar positions were abolished, and the former deputies were officially named people's commissars. Each commissariat, except for those of the two national minorities, was led by two to six people's commissars simultaneously, and some people's commissars were involved in leading multiple commissariats.

The composition of the Governing Council from 3 April 1919 to 24 June 1919 was as follows:

- Chairman of the Revolutionary Governing Council: Sándor Garbai
- People's Commissars of Social Production: Jenő Varga, Antal Dovcsák, Gyula Hevesi, József Kelen, and Mátyás Rákosi, along with Ferenc Bajáki (from 7 April 1919)
- People's Commissars of the Interior, Railways, and Shipping: Jenő Landler and Béla Vágó
- People's Commissars of Agriculture: Jenő Hamburger, György Nyisztor, and Károly Vántus
- People's Commissars of Military Affairs: Béla Kun, Vilmos Böhm, Rezső Fiedler, József Haubrich, and Béla Szántó
- People's Commissars of Justice: Zoltán Rónai and István Ládai
- People's Commissars of Public Supply (from 5 April, Public Supply Commissars): Mór Erdélyi, Artúr Illés, and Bernát Kondor
- People's Commissars of Public Education: Zsigmond Kunfi, György Lukács, Sándor Szabados, and Tibor Szamuely
- People's Commissars of Foreign Affairs: Béla Kun, Péter Ágoston, and József Pogány
- People's Commissars of Labor and Public Welfare: Dezső Bokányi and Antal Guth
- German People's Commissar: Henrik Kalmár
- People's Commissars of Finance: Béla Székely and Gyula Lengyel
- Ruthenian People's Commissar: Ágoston Stefán

The next reorganization of the Soviet government was related to the establishment of the National Economic Council from 25 May 1919, which absorbed the five economic branch commissariats (agriculture, social production, public supply, transportation, and finance). Additionally, transportation matters were transferred from the Interior, Railways, and Shipping Commissariat, renaming it simply the Interior Commissariat. However, this reorganization likely could not be fully implemented, as indicated by some documents issued by sectoral commissars in June. The regulations regarding the organization, scope, and names of the National Economic Council's departments were often inconsistent and contradictory.

=== June–August ===
The highest body of the Soviet Republic, the National Assembly of Councils (TOGY), met between 14 June 1919 and 23 June 1919 and adopted the constitution of the Hungarian Socialist Federative Soviet Republic. On its last session day, TOGY elected the 150-member Allied Central Executive Committee, which entrusted the new Revolutionary Governing Council the next day. Its composition, in line with the constitution, was as follows:

- Chairman of the Revolutionary Governing Council: Sándor Garbai
- Vice-Chairman of the Revolutionary Governing Council: Antal Dovcsák
- Members of the Presidency of the National Economic Council, also people's commissars: Jenő Varga, György Nyisztor, Gyula Lengyel, and Ferenc Bajáki
- People's Commissar of the Interior: Jenő Landler
- People's Commissar of Military Affairs: Béla Szántó
- People's Commissar of Justice: Péter Ágoston (did not actually take over the leadership of the commissariat; the duties were carried out by the former leader, Zoltán Rónai, as deputy interior commissar)
- People's Commissar of Public Education: József Pogány
- People's Commissar of Foreign Affairs: Béla Kun
- German People's Commissar: Henrik Kalmár (temporarily until 25 July 1919)
- People's Commissar of Public Welfare and Public Health: Antal Guth
- Ruthenian People's Commissar: Ágoston Stefán (temporarily)

The direction of labor affairs was transferred to the National Economic Council, which led to the renaming of the Labor and Public Welfare Commissariat to Public Welfare and Public Health.

== Decrees ==
The most important measures of the Hungarian Soviet Republic were issued as decrees by the Governing Council.

== Sources ==
- József Bölöny, László Hubai. Hungary's Governments 1848–2004, 5th edition, Budapest: Akadémiai (2004). ISBN 963058106X
- Academic Small Lexicon I. (A–K). Chief editors: Mihály Beck, Vilmos Peschka. Budapest: Akadémiai. 1989. ISBN 963-05-5280-9
- Albert Váry: The Victims of the Red Rule in Hungary. Budapest, HOGYF EDITIO. ISBN 978 963 848 400 0
- The Minutes of the Revolutionary Governing Council, 1919; editors: Magda Imre and László Szücs; MOL, Bp., 1986 (Hungarian National Archives Publications II. Source Publications)
- Edited by: Sándorné Gábor, Tibor Hajdu, Gizella Szabó: Selected Documents of the History of the Hungarian Labor Movement. March 1919 – August 1919. Budapest: Kossuth Publishing House, p. 5 (1959)
- The Constitution of the Hungarian Socialist Federative Soviet Republic
