= Ferenc Bajáki =

Hungarian politician

Ferenc József Bajáki (May 6, 1883 – March 3, 1938) was a Hungarian politician and one of the leaders of the Hungarian Communist Party and Hungarian Soviet Republic. He was murdered during the Great Purge.

== Early years ==
Ferenc Bajáki was born on May 6, 1883, the son of Ferenc Bajáki and Etelka Szelei, in Kecskemét. At the age of 17, he joined the professional association of locksmiths and the Social Democratic Party of Hungary (Magyarországi Szociáldemokrata Párt or MSZDP) in 1900, and later worked as the locksmiths' chief trustee at Manfréd Weiss Steel and Metal Works.

On May 16, 1910, in Erzsébetváros, Budapest, he married Terézia Barina, a reformed tailor, daughter of István Barina and Julianna Mészáros. In 1917, he became the secretary of the locksmith department in the Central Union of Iron and Metal Workers.

== Revolution and counterrevolution ==
In the fall of 1918, he still took an anti-communist stance, but by March 1919 he had already become a supporter of unification and even joined the Party of Communists in Hungary (Hungarian: Kommunisták Magyarországi Pártja or KMP). During the Hungarian Soviet Republic he was the People's Commissar for Social Production, alongside Jenő Varga, Antal Dovcsák, Gyula Hevesi, József Kelen and Mátyás Rákosi. On June 24, the Allied Central Steering Committee, elected the previous day by the National Assembly of Councils, elected him chair of the People's Economic Council, along with Varga, György Nyisztor and Gyula Lengyel. The council also consisted of nine departments, of which he headed the labor department. On July 31, 1919, he took part in the nighttime meeting led by Béla Kun, in which the hopeless situation of the Soviet Republic was discussed.

In 1920, following the collapse of the Hungarian Soviet Republic and the seizure of power by Admiral Horthy he was a defendant in the people's commissar trial. Found guilty, he was sentenced to life in prison.

== Exile, death and rehabilitation ==
In 1921 he was sent to Soviet Russia as a result of the Soviet-Hungarian prisoner exchange. Here he joined the Communist Party of the Soviet Union and took part in the restoration of Soviet industry and the construction of the new socialist large-scale industry.

He was arrested on February 28, 1938 on charges of counter-revolutionary activity. He was sentenced to death on March 2, 1938, and executed the next day. His son was also arrested and executed. On February 25, 1956, he was rehabilitated together with Béla Vágó.

He was rehabilitated in 1956 alongside Béla Vágó.

== Legacy ==
Csepelen Street was named after him until 2011, when it was renamed Mansfeld Péter Street.

== See also ==
- Hungarian Soviet Republic
