= Ottó Korvin =

Hungarian politician

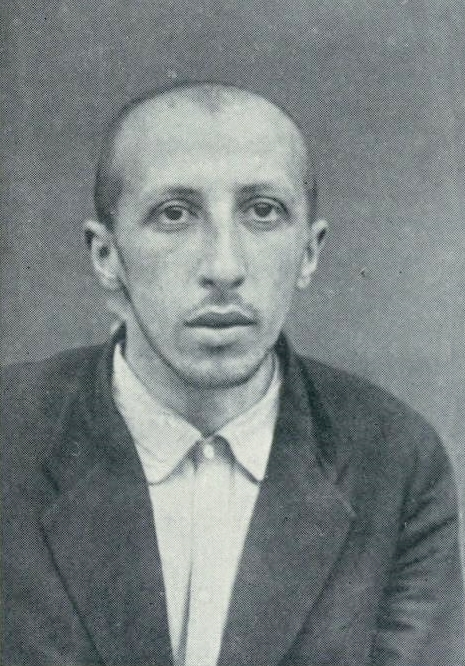
- Korvin after his arrest in 1919
- Born: March 24, 1894; Nagybocskó, Kingdom of Hungary, Transleithania, Austria-Hungary
- Died: December 29, 1919 (aged 25); Budapest, Hungarian Republic
- Cause of death: Execution by hanging
- Burial place: Fiume Road Graveyard
- Occupations: Politician, bank clerk
- Title: Member of the Hungarian National Assembly of Soviets
- Term: June 14–23, 1919
- Partner: Erzsébet Sipos

Ottó Korvin (born Ottó Klein; 24 May 1894 – 28 December 1919) was a Hungarian communist who was politically active in the Hungarian Soviet Republic. He served as the chief of the Political Department of Internal Affairs. After the fall of the Hungarian Soviet Republic, Korvin was arrested by counter-revolutionary forces and hanged.

He was the brother of József Kelen.

== Biography ==
Born into a wealthy, enlightened Jewish family, his mother was Berta Eisenstädt and his father was Zsigmond Klein, a store manager who settled in Nagybocskó at the end of the 19th century. They had two children: József Klein (later József Kelen) and Ottó Klein. Later they moved to Máramarossziget, and the children went to school here. From 1906 they lived in Budapest where Ottó became a member of the Galileo Circle. He was made a poet and took the name Korvin on the advice of an editor. In the early 1910s, he met Zoltán Franyó, art historian Hugó Kenczler, and Tibor Szamuely. In 1912, he published a lyrical portfolio entitled "Sápadások" ("Pallors").

Ottó Klein's father, meanwhile, rented a forest in Oszatelep and set up a logging farm, where he invited Ottó to act as a "forest manager" in 1912. After the outbreak of World War I, Klein enlisted as a soldier, but was able to leave his military service because of his spine problems. He returned to Oszatelep and continued his work until 1917.

At the beginning of 1917, Klein returned to Budapest. Here he studied social sciences and became acquainted with Marxism. As the department head of the capital bank Fabank, he joined the left-wing group of the National Association of Financial Institution Officials and also attended the lectures of Ervin Szabó at the Galileo Circle. On May 1, 1917, he took part in the first workers' demonstration during the war. He was also active in the antimilitarist movement connected to the Galileans. After the arrest of the Galilean leaders in January 1918, an illegal antimilitarist movement that was composed of revolutionary socialists continued to exist. He became this group's leader and remained so when the Galileo Circle was again legalized after the Aster Revolution. In his pamphlets, he encouraged factory workers to form works councils. He helped with the preparation and distribution of a leaflet for a manifestation on March 15, 1918. According to György Lukács, he had been closely involved in a failed assassination attempt of István Tisza on 16 October (Tisza was successfully assassinated two weeks later). He participated in the establishment of the Communist Party (KMP) and then became a member of the Central Committee. He left Fabank and continued to work as a cashier for the Communist Party. For the Red Newspaper, when they didn't want to give them paper, he got the paper from the black market. He was arrested on February 20, 1919. In prison on March 21, he typed the text on the merger of the two parties (MSZDP and KMP). In 1919, Klein changed his family name to Korvin.

=== His role in the Hungarian Soviet Republic ===
After the proclamation of the Soviet Republic, he first became the head of the commercial department of the Socialist Production Committee and issued a decree on the socialization of shops (meaning: nationalization and confiscation). He was later replaced by Dr. Joseph Wagas. His companion was Imre Sallai, his deputies were Ferenc Stein, János Guzi and Károly Benyovszky. The Budapest Revolutionary Court sentenced many people to death on the instructions of Korvin and Jenő László for a crime of counter-revolutionary behavior. Korvin also organized the defense apparatus of the council state. In mid-May 1919, after disarming the Chernig group, 43 people were assigned under Corvary's command in the Political Investigation Department. At the National Assembly of the Councils (June 23), he was elected a member of the Allied Central Management Committee, which re-elected the People's Commissars the next day, June 24. After the fall of the Soviet Republic, on the second of August, while the other Commissars left the country by train departing from Kelenföld, he worked in the Political Investigation Department with Salsa Stein and Ferenc Stein who tried to destroy all of the documents of their department.

=== After the fall of the communist regime ===
He then worked on organizing the illegal communist party, together with Lukács. The latter took on the ideological leadership and Korvin handled the organizational side of things. Lukács later stated that he suspected Béla Kun had intentionally chosen them in the conviction that they would both be killed and "martyred". They were both well-known communists and Korvin had a hunchback, making him easily recognizable. Lukács moreover carried this suspicion because they both had sharp tensions with Kun: he himself disagreed with Kun on "moral issues in the communist movement" and Korvin clashed with the compromise-oriented Kun due to his insistence on class struggle. Korvin's illegal apartment was at 21 Naphegy Street. He received a fake passport with the pseudonym Béla Kornis. But that did not help either, as he soon fell into police hands. István Sulyok, whom he met on the day of his arrest, wrote the following about the arrest and torture of Korvin in a prison on Margit Korvin Boulevard: "On August 7, I ventured into Erzsébet Square, where I met Comrade Korvin. Civilians ran towards us from three sides, one pulled out his revolver, the other caught Comrade Korvin, I jumped under the gate and managed to hide between the trash cans until the gate closed. The next day, to my misfortune, Detective Péter Egri recognized me and took me to the headquarters, which was already crowded with 2300 people. At dawn, they pushed in a battered, bloody human wreck and called out to me, 'Look, here's your boss. You walk like that, and kiss him now.' Group leader Schnell burned Comrade Korvin's neck with a cigar, then I was next." Ottó Korvin's lawsuit began on December 3, 1919, under M.E. 4039/1919 on the basis of an expedited criminal prosecution procedure regulated by decree, before the advice of Judge Gyula Surgoth. The "case of Jenő László and his associates" was considered by the Budapest court. Korvin's defense lawyer was dr. Sándor Goitein. He wrote a prison diary from 12 December 1919 to 18 December 1919. Although only an assassination attempt against the king could be punished by death under the contemporary penal code, a decree of the Friedrich government overruled this, and on this basis, on 19 December 1919, Korvin and his eight associates were sentenced to death. The death sentence by hanging was executed on the morning of December 29, 1919.
