= Burg Karlstein =

Castle in Lower Austria

- Lower Austria, Austria
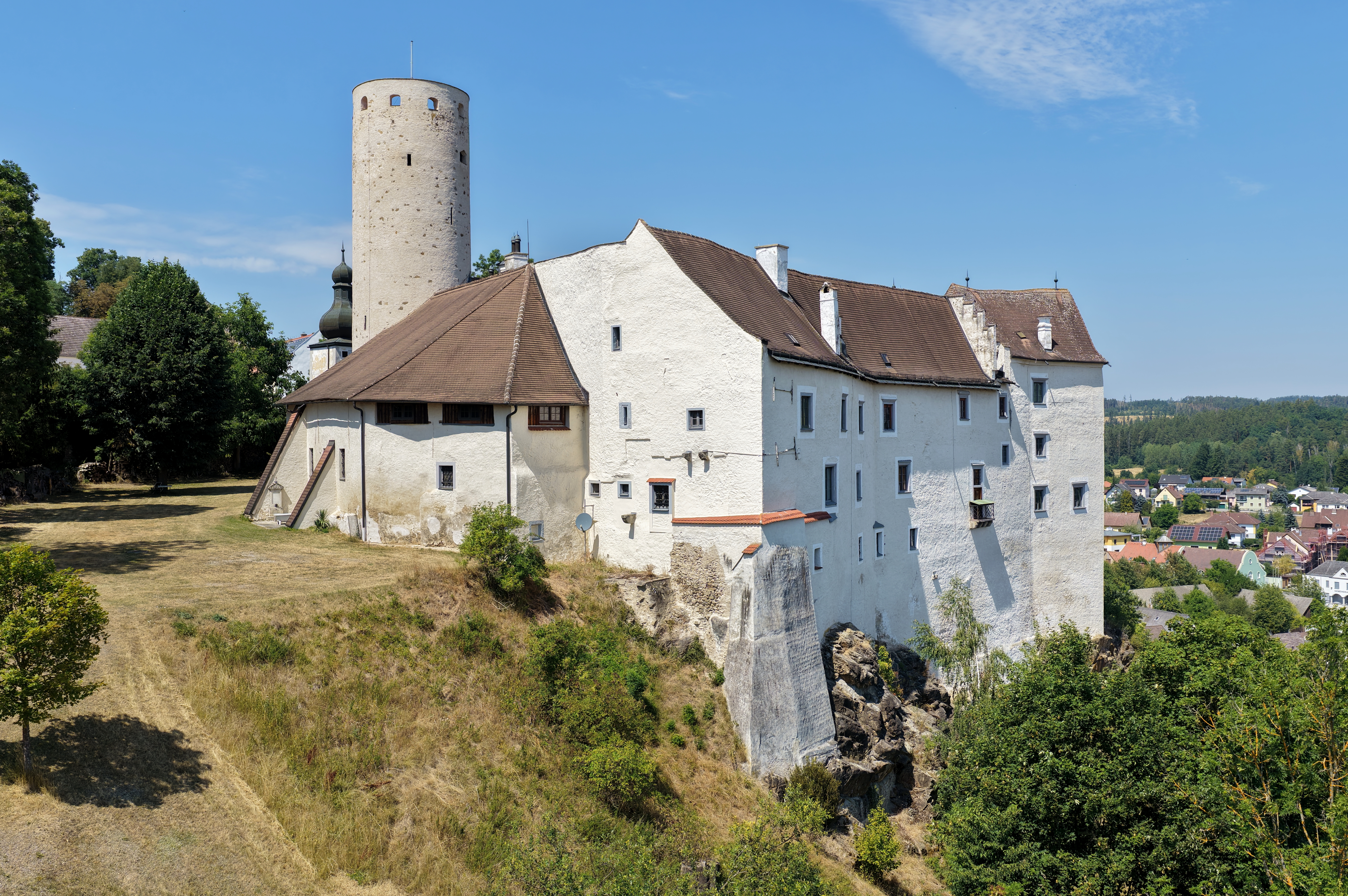
- South-southeast view of Karlstein Castle

Site information
- Type: Castle

Location
- Coordinates: 48.8814°N 15.4028°E

Content in this edit is translated from the existing German Wikipedia article at de:Schloss Karlstein (Niederösterreich); see its history for attribution.

Burg Karlstein is a castle in Lower Austria, Austria.

Karlstein was first mentioned as Chadelstain in 1112. As a Feudal castle (castle held in fief) of various noble families, Karlstein belonged to the respective sovereign. Under the Puchheim family, it briefly became a centre of the Reformation from 1576 onward.

Since it was not continuously owned by one family for extended periods, it was continually rebuilt and expanded. Virtually no elements of the original castle remain. The preserved castle chapel dates back to the 16th century.

Its use has also changed over the centuries. Originally a noble residence, it was also a clock factory from 1880 onwards. The castle also served as a prison for a time. It is believed that the peasant leader Georg Schrembser was imprisoned there until his execution in 1597.

Although the castle, owned by Count van der Straten, was uninhabitable in 1914, an internment camp was established here during the First World War. The Montenegrin General Staff was also imprisoned here.

Before and after the end of the Hungarian Soviet Republic on August 1, 1919, its most important representatives fled to German-Austrian territory, where they were granted asylum and initially housed in the Drosendorf internment camp. Subsequently, Béla Kun and Jenő Landler, a total of approximately 40 people, were brought together at Karlstein Castle, where they faced possible extradition by the Hungarian successor state.

Later the castle was also used as a youth hostel and in the 1960s as a guesthouse.

== See also ==
- List of castles in Austria
