= Tánczos =

Tánczos (Slovak feminine: Tánczosová) is a surname. Notable people with the surname include:

- Barna Tánczos (born 1976), Romanian politician
- Gábor Tánczos (1872–1953), Hungarian politician
- Ján Tánczos (born 1954), Slovak ski jumper
- Nándor Tánczos (born 1966), New Zealand politician
