= Vince Nagy =

Hungarian politician (1886–1964)

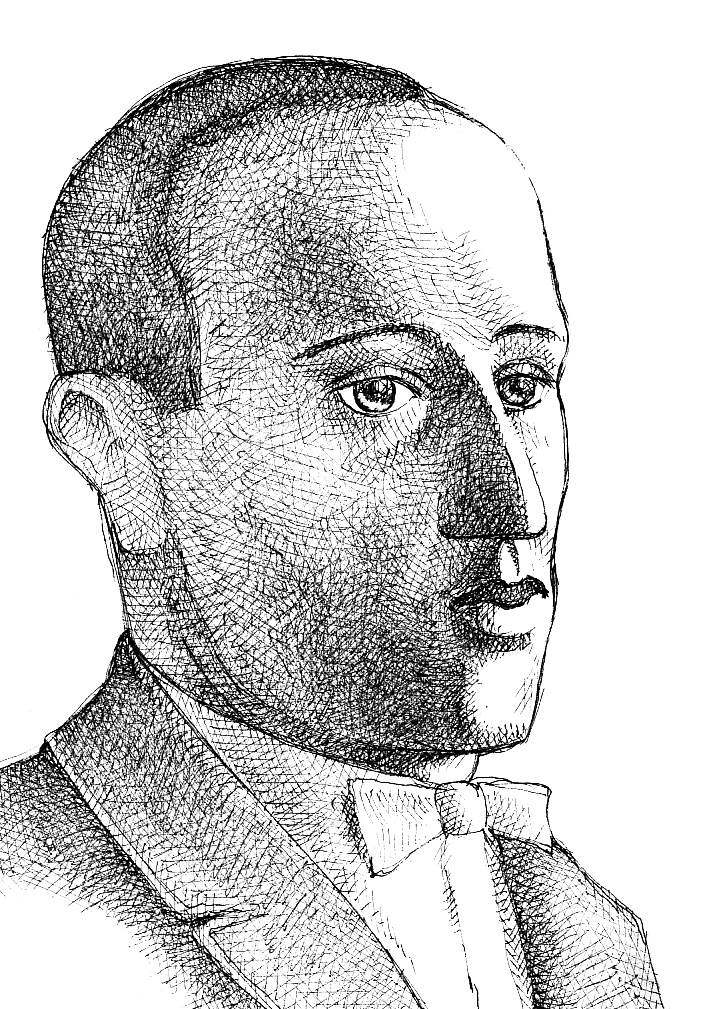

Minister of the Interior of Hungary
- In office 12 December 1918 – 21 March 1919
- Preceded by: Tivadar Batthyány
- Succeeded by: Jenő Landler and Béla Vágó

Personal details
- Born: 4 March 1886 Szatmárnémeti, Austria-Hungary (today Satu Mare, Romania)
- Died: 1 June 1964 (aged 78) New York City, United States
- Party: Party of Independence and '48, FKGP, Hungarian Freedom Party, Hungarian Independence Party
- Profession: politician

Vince Nagy de Losonc (4 March 1886 – 1 June 1964) was a Hungarian politician, who served as Interior Minister between 1918 and 1919 during the Hungarian Democratic Republic. After the establishment of the Hungarian Soviet Republic, he returned to Szatmárnémeti, where the occupying Romanian Army imprisoned him for 9 months. From 1922, he was a lawyer. From 1928, he was the chairman of the Independence Party. After the German occupation (March 21, 1944) Nagy had to escape because of his anti-Nazi views. After the Second World War, he rejected the cooperation with the Hungarian Communist Party (as a Smallholders Party member) and so he was excluded, along with 18 other members from the party.

From 1948, he lived in the United States. He took part in Hungarian emigrant politics. Among other positions, he was an advisor at the Radio Free Europe/Radio Liberty.

== Works ==
- Szálasi és társai a vádlottak padján

Political offices
Preceded by Tivadar Batthyány	Minister of the Interior; 1918–1919	Succeeded by Jenő Landler and Béla Vágó
