= Károly Peyer =

Hungarian politician (1881–1956)

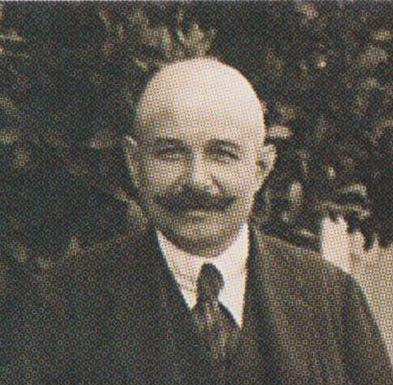

Minister of the Interior of Hungary
- In office 1 August 1919 – 7 August 1919
- Preceded by: Jenő Landler and Béla Vágó
- Succeeded by: Adolf Samassa

Personal details
- Born: 9 May 1881 Városlőd, Austria-Hungary
- Died: 25 October 1956 (aged 75) New York City, United States
- Party: MSZDP
- Profession: politician

Károly Peyer (9 May 1881 – 25 October 1956) was a Hungarian politician who served as Interior Minister for six days after the end of the Hungarian Soviet Republic in 1919. He was later Minister of Works in the cabinets of István Friedrich and Károly Huszár. He took part in the consolidation policy of István Bethlen in 1921: as the leader of the main opposition party (the Hungarian Social Democratic Party) he compromised with the Prime Minister (the Bethlen-Peyer Pact). Peyer was called "betrayer of the left-wing" by the communists.

In 1947 Peyer was excluded from his party, so he joined to the Hungarian Radical Party, which organised against communist rule. Soon Peyer emigrated to the United States. The next year the People's Tribunal sentenced him to 8 years.

Peyer died of a heart attack on 25 October 1956, while listening to the news of the Hungarian Revolution of 1956, which broke out two days earlier.

Political offices
Preceded by Jenő Landler and Béla Vágó	Minister of the Interior; 1919	Succeeded by Adolf Samassa
