= Bertalan Neményi =

Hungarian lawyer and art collector

Dr. Bertalan Neményi (1892-1947) was a Budapest lawyer and art collector.

== Life ==
Bertalan Neményi, was born into a Jewish family in Budapest on 24 July 1892. His father, Dezső Neményi (originally Neumann), worked as an auditor for the Hungarian Royal Defence Ministry. His mother was Olga Goldberger. His parents married in 1891.

Neményi studied law at Budapest's University of Law, and after several years in private practice, joined Hungary's United Light Bulb and Electric Co., eventually becoming the director.

Due to his Jewish origin he was removed in accordance with Hungary's anti-semitic laws from the register of lawyers in June 1944.

His art collection, which included many works by Egon Schiele, were stolen from the depot of Kommerzbank, Budapest, and their current whereabouts are unknown.

He wrote The state of the Hungarian people and emigration to the United States.

== Art Collection ==
Neményi had an important art collection in the interwar period. Over 300 artworks from his collection are registered on the German Lost Art Foundation with search requests.
