= Tivadar Batthyány =

Hungarian politician (1859–1931)

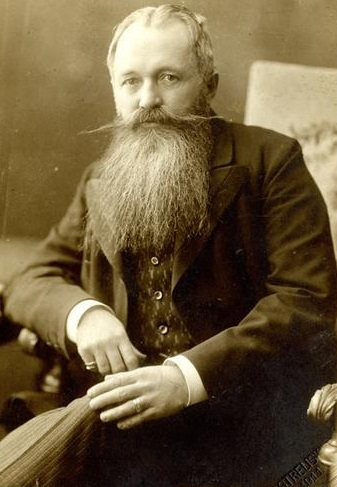

Minister of the Interior of Hungary
- In office 31 October 1918 – 12 December 1918
- Preceded by: Sándor Wekerle
- Succeeded by: Vince Nagy

Personal details
- Born: 23 February 1859 Zalaszentgrót, Kingdom of Hungary, Austrian Empire
- Died: 2 February 1931 (aged 71) Budapest, Hungary
- Party: Independence Party
- Profession: politician

Count Tivadar Batthyány de Németújvár (23 February 1859 in Zalaszentgrót, Zala County – 2 February 1931 in Budapest) son of Count Zsigmond Batthyány de Német-Ujvár, and Johanna Nepomucena Justina Maria Goberta Erdődy.

== Early life ==
He was the eldest son of Count Zsigmond Károly Batthyány (1829–1906) and Johanna Nepomucena Erdődy de Monyorókerék et Monoszló (1835–1915). His father was actively involved in the 1848 revolution and become adjutant of Richard Debaufre Guyon.

Count Tivadar went to high school in Kalocsa but completed it in Fiume, graduated from the Imperial and Royal Naval Academy in Fiume.

== Career ==
A naval officer, he was promoted to Korvettenkapitän. In 1881 nominated long distance marine captain, in 1882 principal inspecting officer in the port of Fiume, and commander of the floating docks; in 1883 the Hungarian Trade Minister Széchenyi decided to create a Central Maritime office at the government, nominated Tivadar Batthyány Secretary of the Ministry of Trade and member of the board of "Adria", with the function of governmental fiduciary.

In 1890, he was the general shipping inspector of "Adria". In 1892, he was first elected to Parliament, representing the Liberal Party, as Deputy of Fiume. In 1904, he was Representative of the Independence Party. From 14 October 1909 to 12 November 1909, he briefly served as Second Vice-Chairman of the House of Representatives. In 1910, he was Vice-President of the Independence Party. In 1918, he was Minister of Labor and Social Care. From 31 October 1918 to 12 December 1918, he was a member of the National Council. Minister of the Interior, entrusted by the King about the liquidation of the Ministry (1-18 November). During the period of the Hungarian Soviet Republic he resided in Vienna. In 1921 Count Tivadar Batthyány tried to return in the Independence Party, but he had no longer a major role in political life.

== Personal life ==
Batthyány was married to Ludovika Olga Károlina Philippina Antónia Batthyány (1869–1939), a daughter of Count Mária József György Ferenc Károly Batthyány and Ludowika "Luise" Franziska Agnes Karola grófnő Batthyány.

The Count died on 2 February 1931 in Budapest.

Political offices
Preceded by Ervin Roszner	Minister besides the King; 1917	Succeeded by Aladár Zichy
Preceded by Sándor Wekerle	Minister of the Interior; 1918	Succeeded by Vince Nagy
Preceded by Aladár Zichy	Minister besides the King; 1918	Succeeded by Mihály Károlyi
