= Márton Lovászy =

Hungarian politician

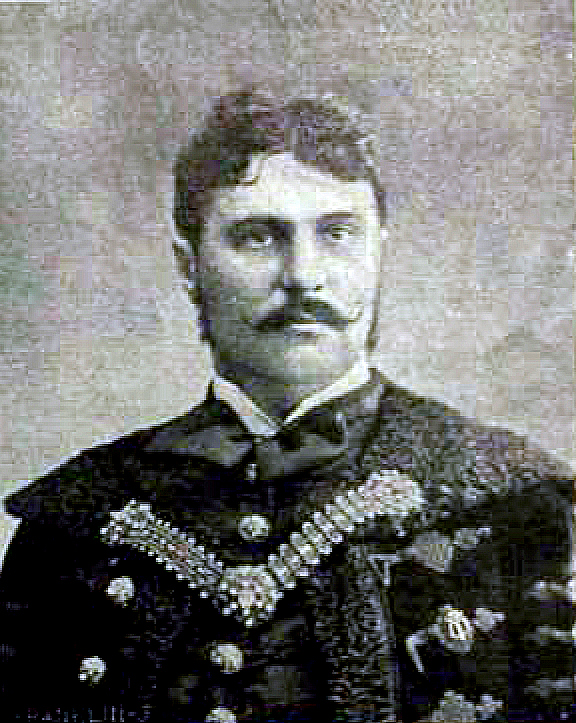

Minister of Foreign Affairs of Hungary
- In office 15 August 1919 – 11 September 1919
- Preceded by: Gábor Tánczos
- Succeeded by: József Somssich

Personal details
- Born: 6 November 1864; Zenta, Kingdom of Hungary
- Died: 21 August 1927 (aged 62); Budapest, Kingdom of Hungary
- Political party: Independent
- Profession: politician, journalist

Márton Lovászy (6 November 1864 – 21 August 1927) was a Hungarian politician, who served as Minister of Foreign Affairs in 1919. He was one of the leaders of the Independent Party during the Austro-Hungarian Monarchy. He did not support the First World War and the alliance with the German Empire. He published an article in his newspaper (Magyarország) which welcomed the breaking of the October Revolution in the Russian Empire.

Lovászy participated in the Aster Revolution. He was a member of the National Council and served as Minister of Religion and Education in the Mihály Károlyi administration. After that he retired from the politics, because he disapproved the additional procession of the revolution. He lived in Vienna for a short time. Then he returned and István Friedrich appointed him Minister of Foreign Affairs. Lovászy didn't agree with Miklós Horthy's politics so he immigrated to the Kingdom of Yugoslavia. He often attacked the Hungarian system in his articles and his speeches. The public prosecutor's department took an indictment out against him in 1925. He was permitted to return home with the condition that he withdraws from political life. Lovászy died soon afterwards.

Political offices
Preceded by János Zichy	Minister of Religion and Education; 1918	Succeeded by Sándor Juhász Nagy
Preceded by Gábor Tánczos	Minister of Foreign Affairs; 1919	Succeeded by József Somssich
