= John Pepper =

Hungarian politician (1886–1938)

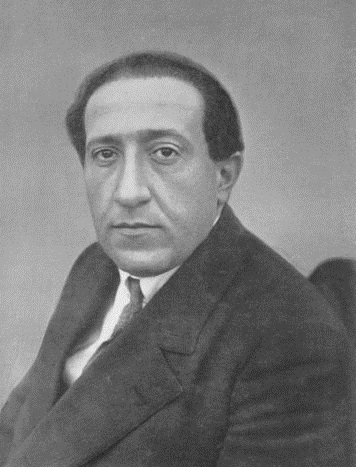
- Pepper circa 1919
- Born: József Schwarz; November 8, 1886; Budapest, Austria-Hungary
- Disappeared: July 29, 1937 (aged 50); Moscow, Soviet Union
- Died: February 8, 1938 (aged 51); Moscow
- Cause of death: Execution in the Great Purge
- Education: University of Budapest
- Occupations: Journalist, political activist
- Spouse: Irén Czóbel Pogány
- Parent(s): Vilmos Schwartz; Hermina Weinberger

József Pogány, known in English as John Pepper or Joseph Pogany, (November 8, 1886 – February 8, 1938) was a Hungarian Communist politician. He later served as a functionary in the Communist International (Comintern) in Moscow, before being cashiered in 1929. Later as an official in the Soviet government, Pepper ran afoul of the secret police and was executed during the Great Terror of 1937–38.

== Background ==
József Pogány was born József Schwartz in Budapest in Hungary. He was the first of three children. His family were ethnic Jews, but he himself adopted the Hungarian name Pogány to de-emphasize his Jewish origins. His father, Vilmos Schwarz, was a tradesman who became a minor civil servant; he also served Chevra Kadisa synagogue in Pest. His mother Hermina Weinberger was a hairdresser. He was not related to artist Willy Pogany, as was once claimed by Whittaker Chambers. Pogány studied at the University of Budapest (1904-1908); he spent his last six months of studies in Berlin and Paris. He wrote his dissertation on János Arany.

== Career ==
=== Hungary ===
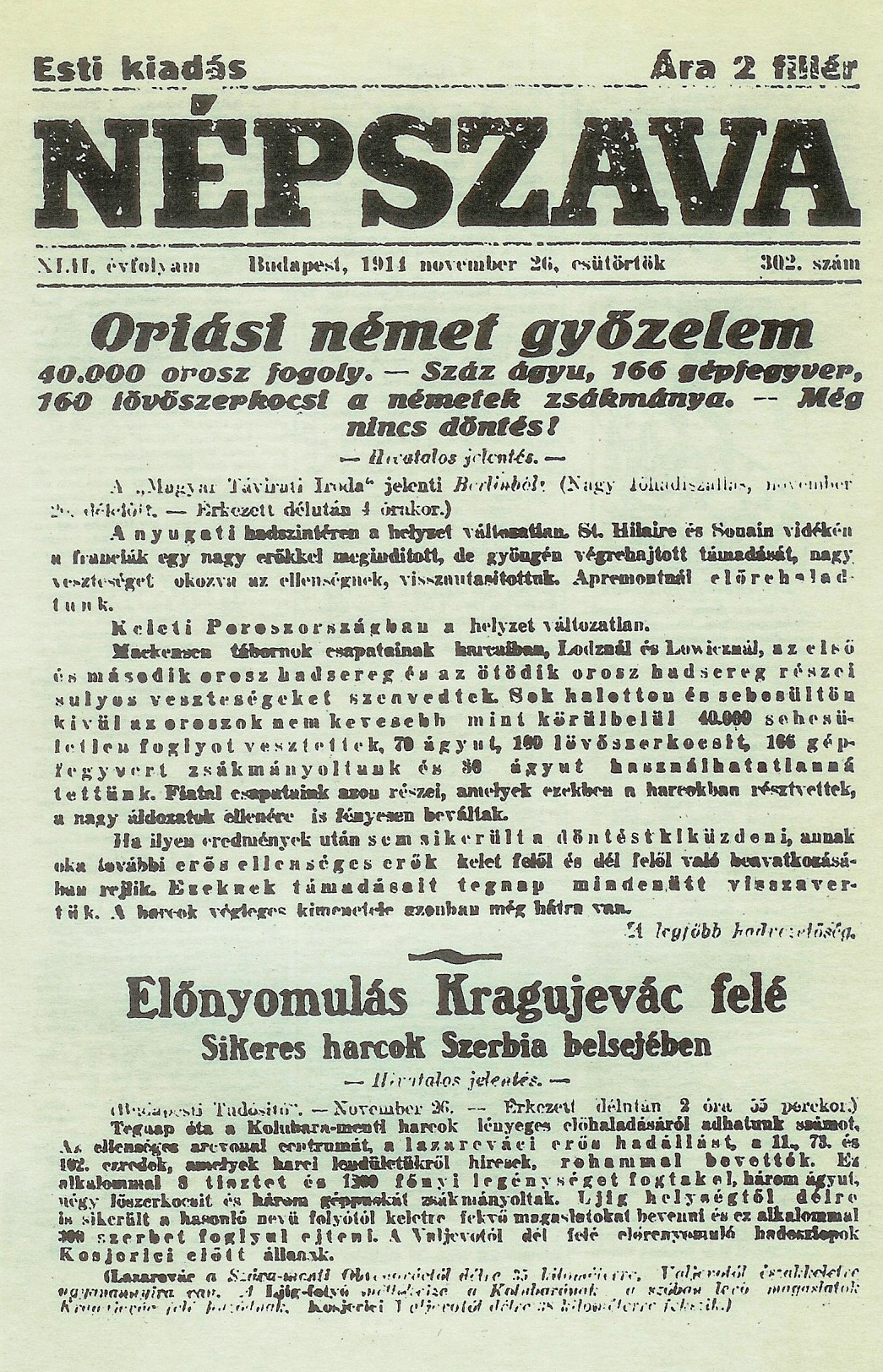
Népszava, the Hungarian socialist newspaper for which József Pogány wrote during World War I.

Pogany worked as a high school teacher and journalist in Hungary prior to the revolution of 1918–1919. He wrote for the official organ of the Hungarian Social Democratic Party, Népszava (People's Voice), and was a war correspondent during the years of World War I.

Despite lack of military credentials aside from war reportage, at the time of the collapse of the Austro-Hungarian empire in 1918, Pogány found himself as the leader of the Budapest Soldiers' Soviet. While Pogány dedicated himself to promotion of what one historian has called "the often impossible demands of the soldiers," he nonetheless remained for a time supportive of the policies of the left-wing government of Count Mihály Károlyi.

On 13 November 1918, Mihály Károlyi's new minister of defense, Albert Bartha, decided to take on the Budapest Soldiers' Soviet head on in an attempt to bolster the sagging discipline of the army. Bartha declared that he would "no longer tolerate Soldiers' Councils," a position which greatly agitated the newly empowered soldiers. On 4 December he was forced to retreat from this position, however, when the disciplinary power of the officers was transferred to new popularly elected military tribunals. Bartha attempted to dodge this decision with the establishment of new disciplinary "flying squads," but this move was regarded as counterrevolutionary and Bartha was forced to resign on 11 December. Before this resignation was publicized, Pogány, acting without the endorsement of the Social Democratic Party, led a soldiers' demonstration on the Ministry of Defense demanding Bartha's dismissal. The formal announcement of the resignation on 12 December made it appear to have been the direct result of the street action, further bolstering the status of the Budapest Soldiers' Soviet at the expense of the authority of the officers corps.

At the time of the March 1919 uprising which proclaimed a Hungarian Soviet Republic with Béla Kun as de facto leader, Pogány cast his lot decisively with the revolution. The Communist Party of Hungary (KMP) first merged with radical members of the Social Democratic Party to form a single organization. Pogány was one of five party leaders signing the unity document on behalf of the Left Socialists. While the two parties were formally ratifying the agreement, Pogány's Soldiers' Soviet assumed control of the Budapest police, occupied the collector jail, and dispatched armed bands throughout the capital to intimidate political opponents.

A Revolutionary Governing Council was established on 21 March 1919, with Pogány named People's Commissar of War. The first two decrees of the Revolutionary Governing Council instituted the death penalty for armed resistance to the new regime and a total prohibition of alcohol consumption in Hungary. The next day, newspapers appeared carrying the proclamation drafted by Kun and Pogány proclaiming the establishment of a Hungarian Soviet Republic.

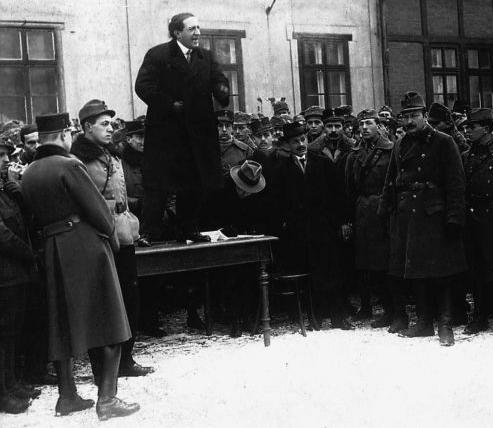
József Pogány speaks during the Hungarian Revolution of 1919.

One of Pogány's first acts as People's Commissar of War was to summarily dismiss all "non-proletarian elements from the Hungarian military and to abolish conscription. It was hoped that a new recruitment campaign targeted at wage-workers and landless peasants would make up the losses, resulting in a homogeneous and loyal military organization. This policy, begun by Pogány and continued by his successor, proved to be a total failure, however, as only about 5,000 qualified individuals chose to enlist in the Hungarian Red Army after an intensive three week campaign.

The former Communists did not trust the former Left-Socialists now enlisted as party allies, however. Pogány clashed pointedly with a number of hardline Communist Party radicals, including Tibor Szamuely and Béla Vágó. On 2 April, Pogány was shifted to the less sensitive position of deputy People's Commissar of Foreign Affairs, while Szamuely was transferred to the People's Commissariat of Culture, where he assumed responsibility for the revolutionary government's military recruitment campaign. Pepper was shortly moved again to the position of People's Commissar of Education, a position which he retained until the fall of the revolutionary government on 1 August 1919.

Despite his removal as head of the People's Commissariat of War, Pogány remained a member of governing Revolutionary National Council, in which he seems to have maintained an ultra-radical position against a negotiated truce with Romania and in favor of an all-or-nothing gamble on the policy of uncompromising revolutionary war — a position roughly analogous to that espoused in 1918 by the "Left Communists" in Soviet Russia.

Pogány also joined Tibor Szamuely as an adherent of "Red Terror" — proposing that the Soviet government take as hostages 200 prominent citizens as a means of forcing an end to counter-revolutionary resistance. Although himself of mixed mind on the issue, Kun signed on to the plan. The hostages, many of them elderly and of no significant threat to the regime, were taken before ultimately being liberated as a goodwill gesture in an effort to bring about a negotiated settlement.

Pogány's leading position in the Soviet government made him a target for anti-communist forces. When the Red government was overthrown by Admiral Horthy and his allies, Pogány fled to Austria and later to Soviet Russia to avoid being killed in the reprisals known as the "White Terror." Pogány was accused by the new regime of complicity in the murder of former Hungarian Prime Minister Count István Tisza by a group of soldiers during the Chrysanthemum Revolution of October 1918. He was tried in absentia and convicted along with five others in October 1921, but never extradited for enforcement of the sentence.

=== Germany ===
In March 1921, Pogány was sent to Germany along with Béla Kun to help organize a revolutionary uprising there with the Communist Party of Germany. According to scholar Thomas L. Sakmyster:

Despite the pressure from Moscow on the GCP leadership, Kun and Pogány encountered stiff resistance to their plans from the more moderate faction of the GCP leadership, especially from Klara Zetkin and Paul Levi. They regarded the Comintern agents as obnoxious and unscrupulous outsiders who knew little about conditions in Germany and were proposing a highly unrealistic and potentially disastrous policy... The message either did not reach Pogány or he chose to ignore it, for the action proceeded in Hamburg as planned... The plan to spark a major revolution had failed.. Pogány... made his way back to Berlin.

Following the defeat of this so-called "March Action," Pogány and Kun returned to Moscow, where they attended the 3rd World Congress of the Comintern from 22 June to 12 July.

=== United States ===
Along with other émigré Hungarian radicals in Soviet Russia, Pogány was set to work in the apparatus of the Communist International (Comintern), which was at the time attempting to foment general socialist revolution across Europe. The Hungarian Communists in exile were bitterly divided along factional lines. Pogány, as a member of the governing Central Committee of the Hungarian Communist Party, was closely allied to Béla Kun in the factional turmoil which ensued. The Comintern disapproved of the disorganizing impact of this intra-party war among the Hungarian Communists and ordered the feuding groups to disband in January 1922.

Pogány was dispatched by the Comintern to the United States in July 1922 to assist with the Hungarian Federation of the Communist Party of America (CPA). Upon arrival Pogány adopted a new Americanized name as his own, "John Pepper" — the name by which he was known for the rest of his life — and immediately set about learning the English language. Along with the Comintern's official representative to the CPA, Genrik Valetski, and its representative to the Communist Party's trade union movement, Boris Reinstein, Pepper attended the ill-fated August 1922 convention of the CPA, held in Bridgman, Michigan, narrowly escaping from the clutches of the police who raided the gathering.

Future factional ally Benjamin Gitlow later recalled the initial impression which Pepper made upon him when he first met him at the Bridgman convention:

The second of the three Comintern nuncios looked like a Hungarian version of the proverbial traveling salesman. Short and stocky, with a large head and a disproportionately larger nose that proudly bore a pair of gold-rimmed spectacles perched importantly on its bridge, he dressed like a dude, combed his hair sleek and neat, was always clean-shaven, smoked gold-tipped cigarettes, listened attentively to everything that was being said in his presence, and said absolutely nothing.... In Hungary his name had been Josef Pogány; he came to America as John Pepper.

Making use of his European erudition, storied past as a revolutionary leader, and personal magnetism, Pepper soon emerged as one of the CPA's most authoritative voices. Pepper wrote extensively on international developments and domestic policy questions for the party press, becoming the American Communist movement's most forceful advocates for abandonment of "underground" isolation and adoption of the strategy of constructing a mass Labor Party in America.

Pepper aligned with Jay Lovestone's pro-Bukharin faction, as Whittaker Chambers recalled in his memoirs:

For the first and only time, I attended a Lovestone caucus meeting... I remember the short, arrogant figure of John Pepper, who, as Joseph Pogany, had been the commissar for war in the Hungarian Soviet Government, and who was now the official representative of the Communist International to the American Communist Party, and Lovestone's "gray eminence."

A factional foe, James P. Cannon, later recalled the decisive role which Pepper played in the American Communist movement of the 1920s:

He first came to this country in the summer of 1922 and soon began to regulate party affairs with the arbitrary authority of a receiver appointed by the court to take over a bankrupt concern. His only trouble was that this particular concern was by no means bankrupt, and the receiver's operations met with challenge and opposition which limited his tenure to a rather short term. But while it lasted it was a real merry-go-round which left everybody dizzy. * * *

We were [later] told in Moscow that he had been shipped to America in one of the moves to break up the raging faction fight in the émigré leadership of the defeated Hungarian Communist Party, and that his assignment was to work with the Bureau of the Hungarian Federation of the party in the U.S.

As far as I know, that's all the official authorization he ever had. But Pepper, a manipulator deluxe, was never one to be stopped by the formal rules and regulations which act as restraints on ordinary mortals. The man worked fast.

Pepper was made a member of the governing Central Executive Committee of the CPA's "above-ground" arm, the Workers Party of America, a position to which he was re-elected by the 3rd Convention in January 1924. Pepper allied himself closely with the Executive Secretary of the CPA's "legal" wing, C.E. Ruthenberg, and together the two headed one of the two primary factions in the American Communist Party throughout the second half of the 1920s.

Not surprisingly, Pepper was loathed by the opposition faction headed by William Z. Foster and James P. Cannon, who managed to have Pepper recalled to Moscow by the Comintern in 1925.

=== Soviet Union ===
Once back in Moscow, Pepper headed the Information Department of the Comintern, while continuing to play a role in a factional war that swept the American Communist Party by supporting the various positions of the Ruthenberg-Lovestone faction which came before the Executive Committee of the Communist International (ECCI). An acute factionalist, Pepper was early to attempt to bolster the standing of his American allies in Moscow by agitating against Leon Trotsky and accusing the Foster group of softness towards the discredited Soviet leader.

Pepper was a delegate of the Communist Party of America to the 5th Enlarged Plenum of ECCI, convened in March 1925, to which he delivered the report of the Information Department on 6 April 1925.

At the 6th Enlarged Plenum of ECCI, held in February and March 1926, Pepper was made an alternate member of the Presidium of ECCI and returned to the political commission of that body. At the 7th Enlarged Plenum of ECCI, held in November and December 1926, Pepper was named a member of the political commission, where he was instrumental in helping to remove his nemesis Grigory Zinoviev from the Comintern Presidency. In July 1927 Pepper was elected to the Presidium of ECCI.

Pepper fell from favor in 1928 as Joseph Stalin and Nikolai Bukharin parted company in the Communist Party of the Soviet Union, with Pepper's political views coming under criticism at both the 9th Enlarged Plenum of ECCI and the 6th World Congress of the Comintern. In 1929, Stalin repeated accusations against him at the ECCI Presidium and in May 1929 the Comintern sent an open letter to the American Communist Party relaying the news that the "Pepper case" would shortly be submitted to the disciplinary International Control Commission (ICC) of the Comintern. The ICC returned its verdict in September 1929, confirming the accusations made against Pepper and removing him from all functions in the Communist International.

Following his dismissal from the Comintern, Pepper went to work in the Soviet government. At the time of his 1937 arrest, Pepper was serving as the head of the publicity department of the People's Commissariat of the Food Industry.

== Death ==
Pepper was arrested by the Soviet secret police (NKVD) on 27 July 1937. Following extensive interrogation, he was convicted of "participation in a counter-revolutionary organization" in a summary trial on 8 February 1938 and executed that same day.

== Legacy ==
On 30 May 1956, Pepper was posthumously rehabilitated by the Military Collegium of the Supreme Court of the Soviet Union.

In 1962, the John Birch Society published a postcard as part of a postcard series available through its magazine American Opinion (which evolved into The New American magazine in 1985), a copy of which is available in the archive of supporter and US Representative J. Edgard Chenowth (R-CO). The postcard cites Pogany as "founder of the American Civil Rights Movement" (which the John Birch Society deplored). It based this accusation on his pamphlet American Negro Problems (1928) (which, at the time, was part of CPUSA/CPSU support for a Soviet Negro Republic within the Black Belt in the American South). "There is almost nothing being written, preached, or done, under the "civil rights" slogan today, which is not in accordance and planning and instructions laid down by this alien Communist nearly forty years ago" (as of 1962). It also accuses him of helping to murder Hungarian prime minister Istvan Tisza in 1918 and to destroy the subsequent government of Mihály Károlyi in 1919.

== Works ==
- Arany János politikai nézetei. Budapest: 1909.
- A Balkán-háború és az osztrák-magyar imperializmus. Budapest: 1912.
- Lemberg. Tíz hónap a cárizmus uralma alatt. Budapest: 1915.
- A meghódított Orosz-Lengyelországon keresztül. Budapest, 1915.
- A földre szállt pokol. Az Isonzo eposza: 1916.
- Dánia, a paraszt eldorádó. Budapest: 1918.
- Napóleon. (play) Budapest: 1919.
- Belyi terror v Vengrii. [White Terror in Hungary] Moscow: III International, 1921.
- For a Labor Party: Recent Revolutionary Changes in American Politics: A Statement by the Workers Party. New York: Workers Party of America, n.d. — Three editions: 1. No author listed, 1922; 2. 2nd Revised Edition, New York, 1923; 3. 3rd Revised Edition, Chicago, 1923.
- "The Farmers and the American Revolution," The Daily Worker, vol. 1, no. 317 (Jan. 19, 1924), section 2, pp. 5–6.
- "Lenin," The Daily Worker, vol. 1, no. 320 (Jan. 23, 1924), pg. 1.
- "Underground Radicalism": An Open Letter to Eugene V. Debs and to All Honest Workers Within the Socialist Party. New York: Workers Party of America, 1923.
- The General Strike and the General Betrayal. Chicago: Workers (Communist) Party of America, 1926.
- Why Every Miner Should be a Communist. New York: Workers Library Publishers, n.d. [1928].
- American Negro Problems. New York: Workers Library Publishers, 1928.

== See also ==
- Béla Kun
- C.E. Ruthenberg
- Max Bedacht
- Jay Lovestone
- James P. Cannon
- William Z. Foster
- James P. Cannon
- Hungarian Communist Party
- Chrysanthemum Revolution (1918)
- Hungarian Soviet Republic
- Communist Party of Hungary
- Communist International
- Executive Committee of the Communist International
- Workers Party of America
- August 1922 convention of the CPA
- Willy Pogany (no relation)

Political offices
Preceded by Béla Kun	People's Commissar of Foreign Affairs; 1919	Succeeded by Béla Kun
Preceded by György Lukács	People's Commissar of Education; 1919	Succeeded by Sándor Garbai
