= Ervin Roszner =

Hungarian politician

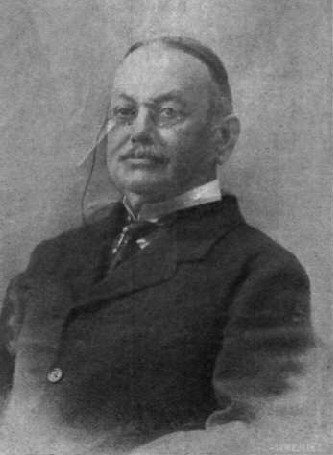

Minister besides the King of Hungary
- In office 29 May 1915 – 15 June 1917
- Monarchs: Franz Joseph I Charles IV
- Preceded by: István Tisza
- Succeeded by: Tivadar Batthyány

Personal details
- Born: December 19, 1852 Varsány, Kingdom of Hungary
- Died: 2 October 1928 (aged 75) Telekes, Kingdom of Hungary
- Party: Liberal Party, Constitution Party, Party of National Work, Constitution Party of 48
- Profession: politician

Baron Ervin Roszner (19 December 1852 - 2 October 1928) was a Hungarian politician, who served as Minister besides the King between 1915 and 1917.

Political offices
Preceded by István Tisza	Minister besides the King; 1915–1917	Succeeded by Tivadar Batthyány
