= Rezső Fiedler =

Hungarian politician

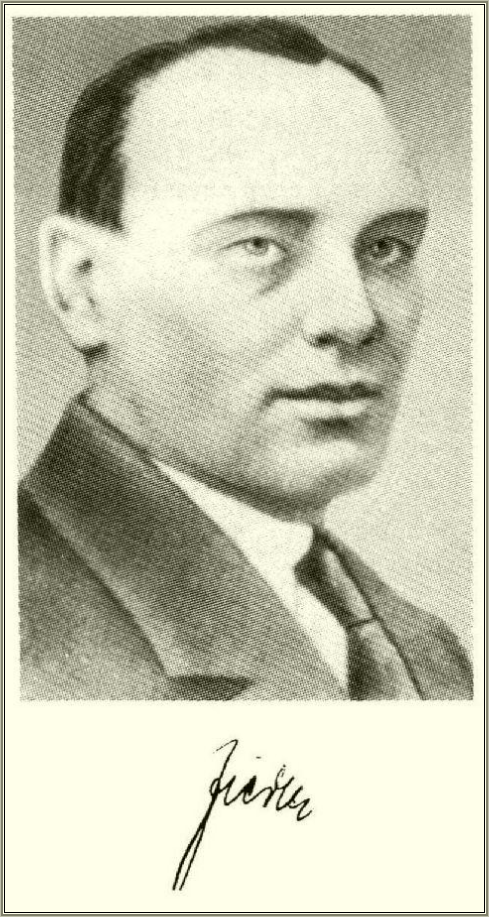

Minister of Defence of Hungary
- In office 3 April 1919 – 24 June 1919
- Preceded by: Vilmos Böhm
- Succeeded by: József Haubrich

Personal details
- Born: János József Rezső Fiedler; 14 June 1884 Budapest, Austria-Hungary
- Died: 1940 (aged 55–56) Soviet Union
- Political party: MSZDP; KMP
- Profession: Lathe worker, politician

János József Rezső Fiedler (14 June 1884 – 1939 or 1940) was a Hungarian worker and politician, a founding member of the Hungarian Communist Party and People's Commissar of Military Affairs of the Hungarian Soviet Republic.

== Biography ==
Fiedler was born in to a Catholic working-class family. He was arrested on October 11, 1898, for theft and received a one-day detention. He joined the iron trade union and the Social Democratic Party of Hungary in 1900, and from 1910 he served as the party's secretary in Arad until 1912.

He took part in Budapest in 1912 strike on 23 May in the "Red Blood Thursday" and was therefore blacklisted. From 1914 to 1916 he fought in the First World War was then directed to the Liptov Ammunition Factory as a specialist. He distributed anti-war propaganda and was an organizer of the 1918 strikes. He participated in the founding of the Hungarian Communist Party and became a member of the first Central Committee, as well as an employee of the Vörös Ujság newspaper. During his term in the Soviet Republic, he was a member of the Governing Council as Deputy Commissioner for Labor and Welfare and from. He was an organizer of the Hungarian Red Army and was a member of the Allied Central Management Committee and the National Assembly of Soviets. In July 1919 he was a corps commander in Székesfehérvár.

After the fall of the Soviet Republic, he emigrated to Czechoslovakia and became secretary of the Red Iron Trade Union and the leadership of the Czechoslovak Communist Party. After his expulsion, he did party work in Ukraine in 1922 and in France the following year. He settled in Germany for a short period and then in 1928, he moved to Moscow where he became a plant manager. In 1934 he was appointed director of the College of Mechanical Engineering there.

He was imprisoned in 1938 during the Great Purge and was executed either in 1939 or 1940.
