= Thomas L. Sakmyster =

American historian

Thomas L. Sakmyster (born 1943) is an American professor emeritus of history of the University of Cincinnati, known for his studies of early 20th-century Hungary, including the "first full-length scholarly study of Hungary's most controversial figure" of the 20th century and the "most important work on the admiral to date", Miklós Horthy, as well as a meticulously-researched even-handed biography of the Hungarian-Soviet spy J. Peters.

== Background ==
Thomas L. Sakmyster was born in 1943 in Perth Amboy, New Jersey. In 1965, he received a BA from Dartmouth. In 1967, he received an MA and in 1971 a doctorate, both in history, from Indiana University Bloomington. His dissertation was on Hungary and the Coming of the European Crisis, 1937-1938.

== Career ==
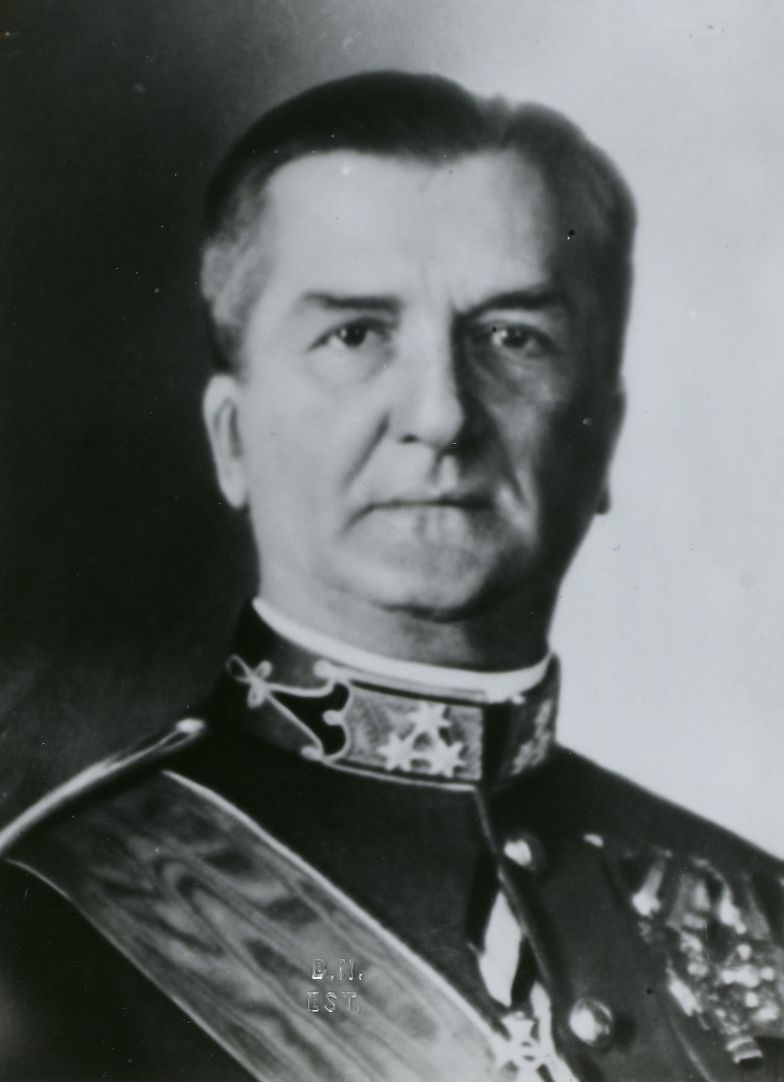
Sakmyster published a biography of Miklós Horthy (photo dated circa 1930)

In 1971, Sakmyster began to teach history at the University of Cincinnati. In 1985, he served as director of graduate studies. As of 1995, he served as Walter Langsam Professor of European History. In 2003, he served as acting chair of History. Sakmyster's published books include biographies of Hungarians Miklós Horthy, J. Peters, and József Pogány.

In 2005, Sakmyster retired and in 2007 became professor emeritus. Since then, he has continued researching, writing, and publishing, mostly on the Shakers.

In 2022, Helena History Press issued a reprint of Sakmyster's Horthy biography.

Following the success of Christopher Nolan's movie Oppenheimer (film) in 2024, the New York Times included Sakmyster as an expert on the question of whether, what kind of and how committed a communist Oppenheimer may have been:

A middle path also exists. Some scholars, not unlike the quantum physicists, see both claims about Oppenheimer as possibly true — that he was and wasn’t a dedicated Communist. Potential clues, they say, can be found in his tangled life. "He may have wavered," said Thomas L. Sakmyster, an expert on underground Communist units. He said that flexible rules let members see their red ties as blurry. Oppenheimer and others, Dr. Sakmyster said, "may have thought of themselves as fellow travelers"— that is, sympathetic to Communism but not formal party members. "Probably quite a few vacillated in this in-between state." In the idiom of the day, they were pink individuals in red groups.

== Works ==
Sakmyster's works include:

Books:

- Hungary, the Great Powers, and the Danubian Crisis, 1936-1939 (1980)
- Hungary's Admiral on Horseback: Miklós Horthy, 1918-1944 (1994, 2022)
  - Miklos Horthy: Ungarn 1918-1944 (2006)
- Red Conspirator: J. Peters and the American Communist Underground (Champaign, IL: University of Illinois Press, 2007)
- A Communist Odyssey: The Life of József Pogány / John Pepper (Central European University Press, 2012)
- The Era of Manifestations in the Shaker West (2024)

Edited Books:

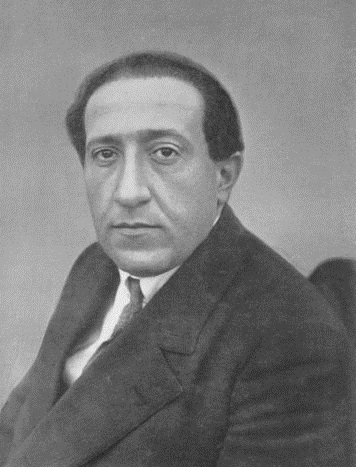
In 2012. Sakmyster published a biography of József Pogány (photo dated 1923)

- The Shakers of White Water, Ohio, 1823-1916 (2024)

Articles:

- "The Hungarian State to Germany of August, 1948: Some New Evidence on Hungary in Hitler's Pre-Munich Policy" Canadian Slavic Studies (1969)
- "Bethlen István Titkos Iratai, Edited by Miklós Szinai and Laszlo Sziics," Canadian Slavic Studies (1974)
- "Army Officers and Foreign Policy in Interwar Hungary, 1918-41," Journal of Contemporary History (1975)
- "From Habsburg Admiral to Hungarian Regent: The Political Metamorphosis of Miklós Horthy 1918–1921," East European Quarterly (1983)
- "A Visit to the Shaker Village of White Water in 1881" (2012)
- "'Radicals' and 'Libertines' in a Shaker Society: The Union Village Lyceum, 1871–1878"

== See also ==
- Miklós Horthy
- J. Peters
- József Pogány

== External sources ==
- University of Cincinnati
