= József Somssich =

Hungarian politician (1864–1941)

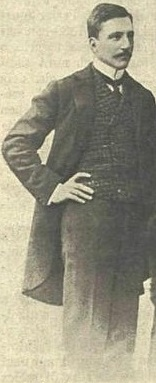
- Count Somssich in 1899

Minister of Foreign Affairs of Hungary
- In office 11 September 1919 – 15 March 1920
- Preceded by: Márton Lovászy
- Succeeded by: Sándor Simonyi-Semadam

Personal details
- Born: 9 December 1864 Graz, Austrian Empire
- Died: 22 January 1941 (aged 76) Budapest, Kingdom of Hungary
- Party: Independent
- Profession: politician

Count József Adolf Somssich de Saárd (9 December 1864 – 22 January 1941) was a Hungarian politician, who served as Minister of Foreign Affairs between 1919 and 1920. Until the First World War he worked for some of embassies (Genova, Berlin, Paris). Between 1920 and 1924 he served as ambassador to Vatican. Somssich was a member of the House of Magnates.

Somssich's wife was Countess Kamilla Szőgyény-Marich (1876–1966), a daughter of a former diplomat and minister Count László Szőgyény-Marich. Their wedding was held in Berlin in 1899, the event was also attended by the German Emperor William II. The marrying cleric was Sámuel Etyey, the Bishop of Pécs.

Political offices
Preceded by Márton Lovászy	Minister of Foreign Affairs; 1919–1920	Succeeded by Sándor Simonyi-Semadam
