= Dezső Bokányi =

Hungarian communist and stonemason

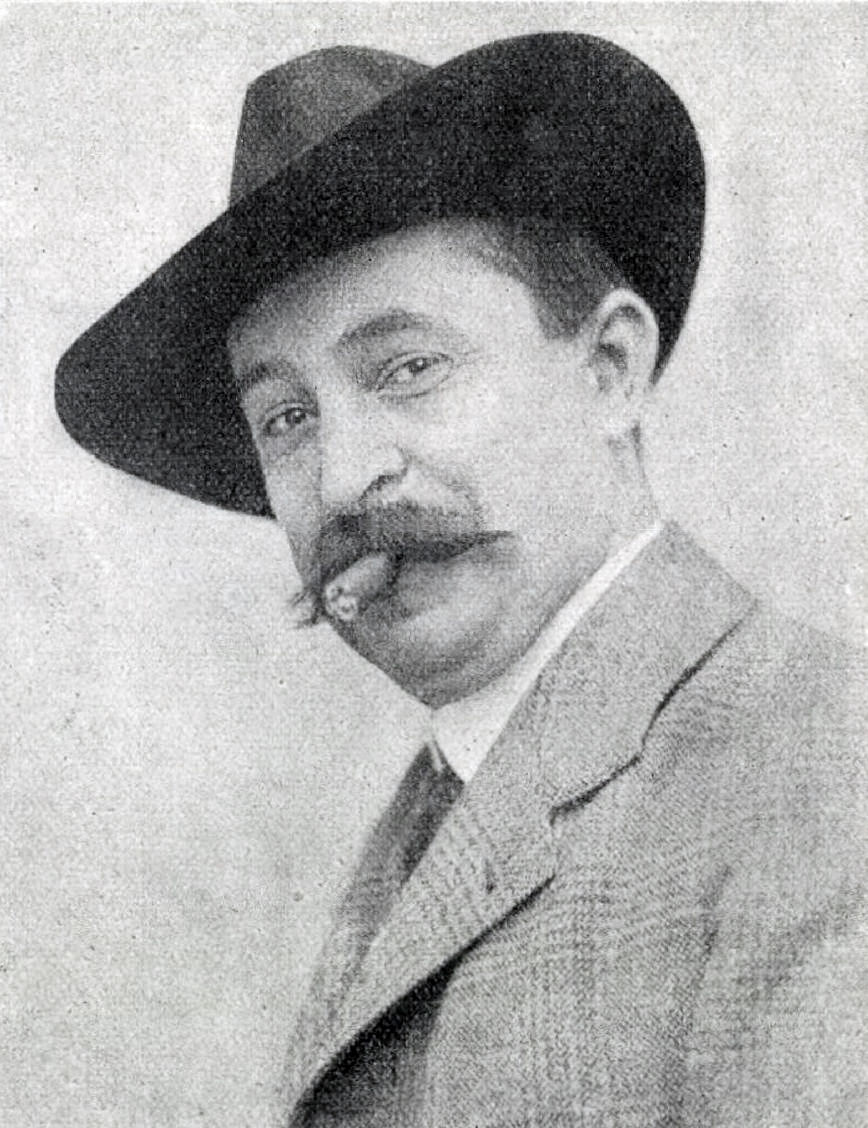
Bokányi circa 1919

Dezső Bokányi (11 February 1871, Pest – June 1943, Moscow) was a Hungarian communist politician, writer, translator and journalist who was a leading figure of the Hungarian Soviet Republic.

== Biography ==
Bokányi was born in to a deeply religious Catholic family and had worked as a stonemason. In 1886 became a member of a trade union and in 1889 he became member of the Social Democratic Party of Hungary. He was distinguished in the Social Democratic Party by his influential ability to speak. In 1893 he was sent to the second congress of the MSZDP. From 1894 to 1919, he was a member of the board and a speaker, and also worked as a journalist. He translated several products of Marxist literature, including several works by Marx, Engels, and August Bebel, into Hungarian. In 1896 he published the first Hungarian translation of the Communist Manifesto, from which the "Világ proletárjai egyesüljetek!" (Proletarians of all countries unite!) was translated for the first time in Hungarian.

After the Aster Revolution, he became a member of the Hungarian National Council, participated in peace negotiations with the Entente powers and became a member of the party leadership in March 1919.

Although initially he did not take heart in the aspirations of Béla Kun and the Communists until 1919, he eventually accepted and even supported the unification of the Hungarian Social Democratic Party and the Hungarian Communist Party and became a prominent leader of the Soviet Republic. During the period of the Soviet Republic, he served as the People's Commissioner for Labor and Welfare of the Revolutionary Governing Council. The leadership of the united party and at the same time the Budapest Central Revolutionary Workers' and Military Council. He was also a member of the Bureau. He attacked many unions because they did not see their main activity in boosting production. His social policy proposals included workers' insurance, the nationalization of pension associations, state benefits for orphans and widows, but also the expropriation of the homes of the rich for the benefit of families with many children and, as an atheist, the abolition of religious teachings in schools.

In December 1920, Bokányi was sentenced to death in the case of the Hungarian People's Commissars after the fall of the Soviet Republic. In 1922, he was a prisoner exchange by the Soviet Union, where he worked in the movement, the work done in the field of social insurance, he also worked at the Moscow radio station.

Dezső Bokányi was arrested during the Great Purge in 1938. It was previously believed that he had died in 1940 in captivity, but according to recent research, he died in a prison hospital in June 1943.
