= Gábor Tánczos =

Hungarian politician

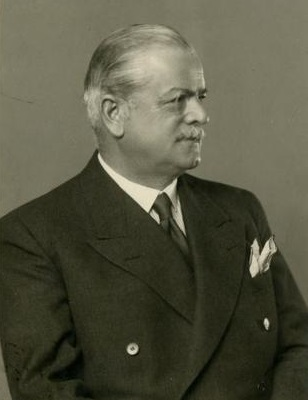
- Born: 22 January 1872; Pest, Austria-Hungary
- Died: 11 August 1953 (aged 81); Hajdúnánás, People's Republic of Hungary
- Military career
- Allegiance: Austria-Hungary; Hungary
- Rank: Cavalry General
- Conflicts: World War I

Gábor Tánczos (22 January 1872 – 11 August 1953) was a Hungarian politician, who served as Minister of Foreign Affairs in 1919 for few days. From 1907 to 1909 he was a military attaché in Belgrade, between 1914 and 1915 in Athens, and between 1915 and 1916 in Bucharest. At the end of the war he served as Emperor-King Charles I's adjutant. He was the Hungarian-Czechoslovak border establishing commission's Hungarian border commissioner.

Political offices
Preceded by Péter Ágoston	Minister of Foreign Affairs; Acting; 1919	Succeeded by Márton Lovászy
