= Henrik Kalmár =

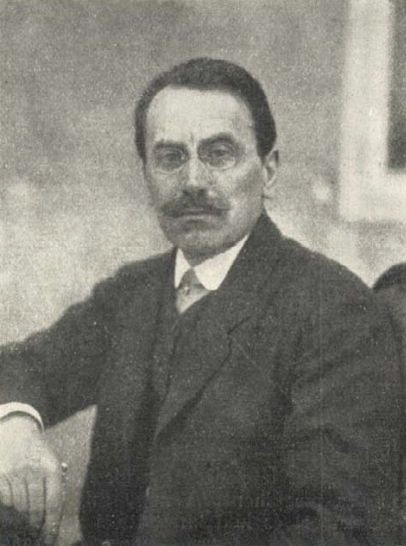
Henrik Kalmár

Henrik Kalmár (born Elkán Kohn; 25 March 1870 – 23 June 1931) was a Hungarian politician, printer, and Social Democrat party secretary.

== Biography ==
Kalmár was born into a Jewish family in Pozsony (now Bratislava) on 25 March 1870, his father was József Kohn his mater was Júlia Grünhut. He acted as a radical social democratic agitator, therefore got deported from Budapest in 1880. Then he participated in the labor movement in Bratislava, the Social Democratic Party, and served as secretary. He became editor of the Westungarische Volksstimme weekly. During the Soviet Republic of Hungary, he acted as People's Commissioner for German Affairs. On August 15, 1919 he was arrested and sentenced for life term in prison. During the prisoner exchange between Hungary and the Soviet Union he went to Czechoslovakia, he again participated in the social democratic movement of Bratislava.

He died on 23 June 1931.
