= Péter Ágoston =

Hungarian politician (1874–1925)

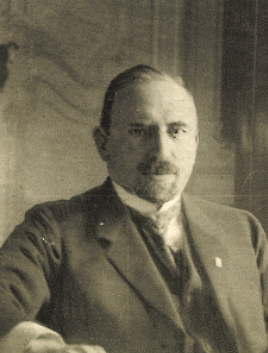

People's Commissar of Foreign Affairs of Hungary
- In office 1 August 1919 – 7 August 1919
- Preceded by: Béla Kun
- Succeeded by: Gábor Tánczos

Personal details
- Born: Peter Augenstein; 25 March 1874 Zsombolya, Austria-Hungary
- Died: 6 September 1925 (aged 51) Paris, France
- Party: Socialist Party of Hungary
- Profession: politician, journalist, legal scholar, jurist, translator, sociologist

Péter Ágoston (born. Peter Augenstein, 25 March 1874 – 6 September 1925) was a Hungarian politician, jurist, legal scholar, professor and translator who served as Minister of Foreign Affairs in 1919.

== Biography ==
Before the First World War, he published articles for the Világ, Népszava, Huszadik század and the Szocializmus newspapers. After the Aster Revolution, he was the Chairman of the National Council in Nagyvárad. In Dénes Berinkey's cabinet, he served as state secretary of the interior. During the Hungarian Soviet Republic, he tried to make connections with the Entente Powers as deputy People's Commissar of Foreign Affairs. Gyula Peidl appointed him as People's Commissar, but after a few days the Peidl cabinet fell after a coup led by István Friedrich.

Ágoston was arrested and sentenced to death. However, he was transferred to the Soviet Union through a prisoner exchange. After that, he lived in emigration in (Moscow, London, and finally Paris). He translated works of Engels, Bebel and Mehring into Hungarian under the pseudonym Pál Rab.

Political offices
Preceded by Béla Kun	People's Commissar of Foreign Affairs; 1919	Succeeded by Gábor Tánczos
