= Gyula Hevesi =

Hungarian chemist, economist and politician (1890–1970)

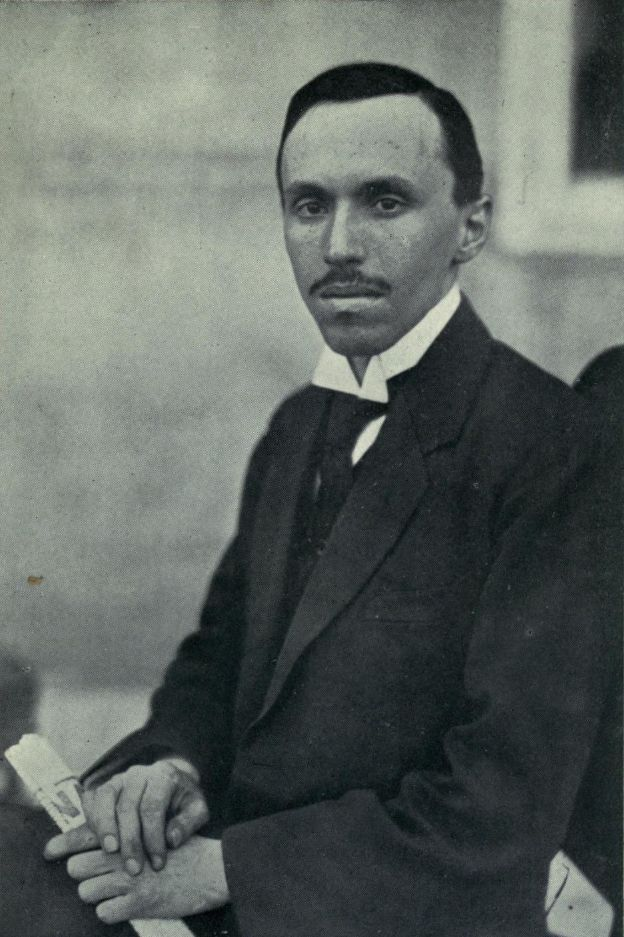
Gyula Hevesi in 1919

Gyula Hevesi (21 November 1890, Ungvár – 25 February 1970, Budapest) was a Hungarian chemical engineer and communist politician. He was a member of the Central Committee of the Hungarian Soviet Republic.

Gyula Hevesi was born into a Jewish family. He was son of Adolf Hevesi and Mirjam Polacsek (Pártos). He continued his high school studies at the Lovag Street grammar school in Budapest. He then studied to be a chemical engineer at the Technical University of Budapest, where he graduated in 1912. During 1913–1914 he worked as a technical consultant of the Pöstyén Spa Directorate, From 1914 to 1918 he worked at the United Incandescent Lamp and Electricity Company initially as a plant engineer then as a research engineer. In 1917 he organized and until 1919 led the National Association of Applied Engineers, the world's first socialist engineering trade union. On 29 December 1918, he married Irma Róthbart (later wife of Ervin Sinkó), daughter of Jakab Róthbart and Janka Rosenwald, but this marriage soon ended in divorce. A year later, he married Stern in Budapest on 19 July 1919, the daughter of Mózes Stern and Regina Auspitz.

In 1918–1919 he worked with Aladár Komját to launch the first Hungarian communist journal, Internationálé.

== Engineering and science ==
In October 1949 he was elected a corresponding member of the Hungarian Academy of Sciences, and in May 1956 he was elected a full member. From 1951 to 1958, then from 1967 to 1970, he participated in the management of the institution as a member of the board. From 1956 to 1960 he became the secretary of the academy, and from 1960 to 1967 he was appointed vice-president. From 1960 to 1969, he was the director of the Industrial Economics Research Group of the Hungarian Academy of Sciences. As a research engineer at Tungsram company, with the help of Ármin Helfgott, he developed important processes for the production of gas-filled incandescent lamps. During his years in the Soviet Union, he solved the problem of economical regeneration of spent light bulbs, organized large-scale production of laboratory glassware and various thermometers. Between 1929 and 1932, he developed a continuous industrial work schedule that allowed for a significant increase in production in basic industries without further investment. In order to (further) train the factory workers, he proposed the establishment of "factory school combinations" and "factory universities", and also participated in their implementation. He organized the Central Technical and Economic Information Institute and, as head of the invention department of the Supreme Economic Council, also supported the spread of the Stakhanov movement.

After his return to Hungary, he was active in boosting the innovation movement. In the decades after the reorganization of the academy, it played an important role in the recognition of technical sciences. He participated in the editing of the first Russian-Hungarian and Hungarian-Russian technical dictionaries.

He was the editor-in-chief of Acta technica Academiae Scientiarum Hungaricae and the Central People's Control Committee's Journal of People's Control, editor of the Publications of the Department of Technical Sciences of the Hungarian Academy of Sciences, editor-in-chief of the Innovators' Journal and contributor of the New Hungarian Encyclopedia.
