= Béla Szántó =

Hungarian politician (1881–1951)

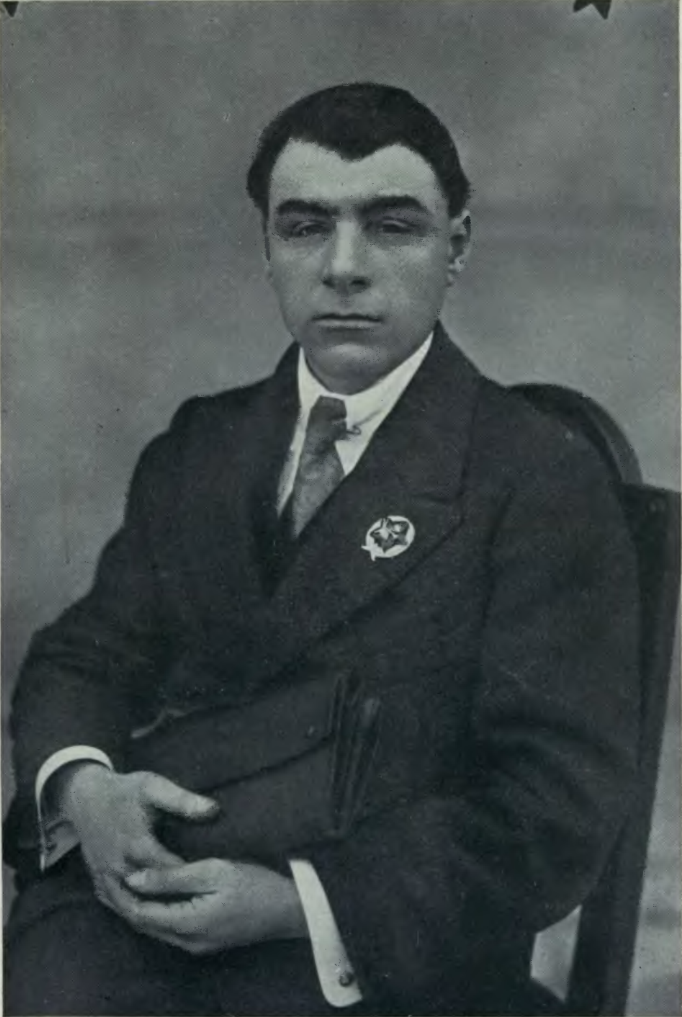

Minister of Defence of Hungary
- In office 3 April 1919 – 1 August 1919
- Preceded by: József Haubrich
- Succeeded by: József Haubrich

Personal details
- Born: 1 February 1881 Homokkomárom, Austria-Hungary
- Died: 1951 Budapest, Hungary
- Party: MSZDP (1904-1919); KMP (1919)
- Spouse: Mária Feldbránd Kammer
- Parent(s): Sándor Schreiber; Szelina Günsberger
- Profession: politician, soldier

Béla Szántó (born as Béla Schreiber, 1 February 1881 – 1 June 1951) was a Hungarian communist politician active participant of the putsch and creation of the Hungarian Soviet Republic in 1919, who later became a critic of the Communist party as led by Béla Kun.

He was born into a Jewish family, his father was Sándor Schreiber and mother Lina Günsberger. He attended elementary school in Homokkomárom, later attended the state civil school (secondary school) in Nagykanizsa. He graduated from the high school in 1900 and worked as an accountant in Kanizsa. In 1906, the Association of Hungarian Private Officials was founded, for which he won the presidency. He was also involved in the antimilitarist movement. On February 18, 1911, in Budapest, in Erzsébetváros, he married Mária (Krammer) Feldbránd, a civic school teacher, who was a daughter of Israel Feldbránd and Zsófia Treibitsch.

Szántó joined the Communist Party of Hungary at age 19, and was elected to the Central Committee in 1919. In the Hungarian Soviet Republic, he served as People's Commissar for Defence. After the revolution collapsed, Szántó fled first to Vienna and then to Moscow. He played an active role in the ECCI, VKP and Profintern.

In 1930, Szántó published a history of the Hungarian Revolution in which he criticized the actions of Béla Kun, the central Hungarian communist leader. That caused hostile relations between Szántó and Kun. With Soviet support, Kun was ousted from the Hungarian party leadership, but Szántó was also targeted; expelled from the Communist Party; and, for a time, arrested. He was rehabilitated in 1940 and returned to Hungary in 1945.
