= Antal Dovcsák =

Hungarian politician

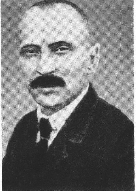
Dovcsák in 1919

Antal Dovcsák (March 11, 1879 – 1962) was a Hungarian Communist politician and trade union leader.

== Biography ==
Dovcsák was born in Budapest and was a lathe worker. From 1911 he was the president of the Central Association of Iron and Metalworkers in Hungary. He briefly served as deputy prime minister of the Hungarian Soviet Republic during July 1919. After the fall of the Soviet Republic he was also a minister in Peidl's government however he was later arrested during the White terror. He was released in 1922 during the Soviet-Hungarian prisoner exchange deal and settled in Austria where he worked as an official for the Austrian iron and metalworkers' union.

Dovcsák died in Vienna in 1962.
