= United Incandescent Lamp and Electricity Company =

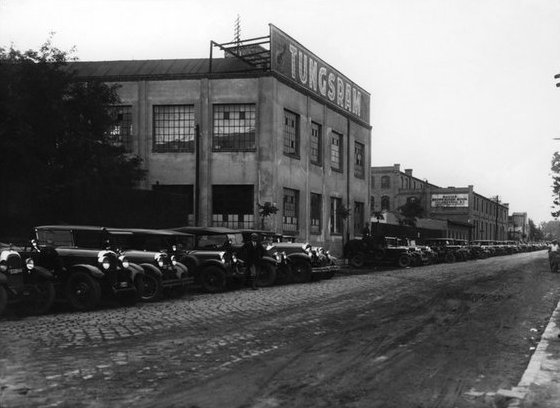
- A factory building in Budapest
- Native name: Hungarian: Egyesült Izzólámpa és Villamossági Rt.
- Type: Private
- Industry: Electrical goods
- Founded: 1886; 140 years ago in Hungary
- Founder: Béla Egger and brothers
- Fate: Merged with United Electricity Company

The United Incandescent Lamp and Electricity Company (Hungarian: Egyesült Izzólámpa és Villamossági Rt.) was a Hungarian business which produced a range of electrical goods such as electrical switches, voltmeters, ammeters, telephones, dynamos, and carbon fibre light bulbs. It was founded by Béla Egger and his brothers in 1886. With the support of the Hungarian Commercial Bank of Pest and the Wiener Bankverein, the original company was involved in a number of mergers it became the United Electricity Company.

== History ==
Lipot Aschner joined the company on July 1, 1892, where he achieved a remarkable career in a short time. In 1904, He became deputy director in 1904, commercial director in 1918, and general manager in 1921. In all his positions, Aschner prioritized the development of incandescent lamp production and the increase of production output. Since the factory on Huszár Street was no longer suitable, the plant was relocated to Újpest, on (outer) Váci Road in 1901.

In 1885 Károly Zipernowsky, Miksa Déri, and Ottó Titusz Bláthy submitted a patent providing a solution for the efficient distribution and transmission of alternating current electricity using transformers. Their invention made it possible to transmit electric power over long distances and to operate consumer devices independently from one another, which opened up an ever-growing range of practical applications.Between 1902 and 1903, the United Electric Company (Egyesült Villamossági Rt.) produced around four million lamps. The factory held its ground in the face of sharp market competition.

Factory technicians experimented to improve the luminous efficiency and lifespan of incandescent lamps by using metal filaments. During these developments, several new products were invented such as the osmium lamp, the Nernst lamp, and later the tantalum lamp. These lamps were superior to their predecessors but still not perfect. Dr. Sándor Just and Ferenc Hanaman developed the tungsten-filament lamp. The United Electric Company immediately purchased the rights to manufacture and sell incandescent lamps using this technology. In 1906, the company's name was changed to United Incandescent and Electrical Company (Egyesült Izzólámpa és Villamossági Rt.), emphasizing its main product, the incandescent lamp. On April 28, 1909, the Tungsram brand was registered, which later became a globally recognized and respected name.

During the First World War, the company further increased production and also began manufacturing radio tubes for military technology.

== Between the World Wars ==
General Electric transferred the technology for automatic lamp manufacturing machinery to the Újpest factory between 1922 and 1923. This transfer enabled the establishment of high-quality domestic machine manufacturing. Subsequently, the mechanical engineering department's role significantly increased from 1927 onward, with the employment of more engineers and technicians who designed advanced equipment for automation. The implementation of automated mass production fundamentally transformed the manufacturing technology. These automatic machines and production lines were later produced both domestically and internationally.

In 1915–1916, the company acquired the bankrupt Újantalvölgyi Glassworks, part of the United Hungarian Glassworks Ltd. On April 5, 1921, it purchased the Tokod Glassworks Ltd., incorporating it into its subsidiaries. The company decided to establish its own glass manufacturing in line with the growing needs of lamp and radio tube production. The establishment of glass production in Újpest had the added advantage of converting the Tokod and Újantalvölgyi factories to produce specialized small-series bulb glass, while large-volume bulb production took place in Újpest, significantly reducing shipping costs. The combined capacity of the three glassworks allowed the company to meet the glass needs of other firms as well. To ensure a steady supply of packaging materials, Lipót Aschner exercised his preemptive purchase right and joined the board of directors of the Néményi brothers' Erzsébetfalva paper mill; his son later became the company's director. This strategy eliminated dependence on external suppliers.

At General Electric, Aladár Pácz's experiments led to the development of a high-temperature tungsten filament. Research by Pál Túry and György Tarján at the Újpest factory furthered this work. Their experiments aimed at improving the tungsten material resulted in the development of the so-called GK (Grosskristal) tungsten filament. Following Imre Bródy's invention of the krypton lamp the company acquired the entire shareholding of the Ajka Coal Mine Ltd. to secure the electrical energy needs of the krypton factory on its own premises. These developments reflect the company's commitment to technological advancement and self-sufficiency in production processes.

== After the German occupation ==
On March 19, 1944, the day of the German occupation of Hungary, Tungsram's CEO, Lipót Aschner, was arrested by the Gestapo. In his absence, Zoltán Bay assumed responsibility for technical operations, while Dénes Jankovich took charge of commercial and administrative matters. The company appointed a new military commander in 1944, who immediately initiated preparations for relocating the factory, with a particular focus on the production of military radio tubes. The Kőbánya Brewery was designated as the site for housing the machinery. In a covert operation, Bay and Jankovich managed to smuggle a significant quantity of raw materials and semi-finished products out of the factory, hiding them in Tárnok and Adorjánháza. Through secret negotiations, they secured Aschner's release from captivity by paying a ransom of 100,000 Swiss francs. On October 23, 1944, the Arrow Cross Party established a factory council, urging the complete evacuation of the premises.

On January 15, 1945, the first Soviet soldier arrived at the factory. Despite prior assurances, approximately 700 wagons of equipment and components were removed from the premises. The Soviets removed 96% of the factory's machinery, 50% of the light bulb inventory, 90% of the raw materials and semi-finished goods from the Tárnok warehouse, and completely dismantled the Ajka krypton factory.

== Troubles after the war ==
The Second World War, the Siege of Budapest, the postwar reparations shipments, and the confiscation of the factory's equipment and inventory imposed a heavy financial burden on the company. At the same time, significant technical redevelopment was required. Contemporary sources estimate the financial losses totaling more than US$12 million. Despite the enormous losses, a substantial portion of the leadership and skilled workforce survived the war. Their expertise proved invaluable during the reconstruction. Among them, the factory's technical directors János Lévai and Péter Iván Valkó stood out.

In addition to the removal of machinery, the company faced challenges such as disrupted material supply and a lack of appropriate equipment. It was only in September 1945 that twenty-four precision machine tools from Switzerland, Denmark, and Czechoslovakia were successfully commissioned, with assistance from the company's foreign subsidiaries. Further difficulties arose from the dismantling of the Újpest glassworks; fortunately, machines intended for the Argentine subsidiary were successfully returned to Újpest.

As Hungarian companies and factories were integrated into the Soviet sphere's plant-based economy, a proposed license agreement with General Electric was not signed by the Hungarian National Bank. The lack of a licensing agreement caused the technological development to slow down at the factory.

== Nationalization and postwar challenges ==
The nationalization of the company began in December 1945 with the incorporation of the Izzó (Incandescent Lamp) division. During the nationalization of the mines, the Ajka Coal Mine was removed from the ownership of the Újpest-based company, and the Ajka Power Plant was nationalized at the end of 1946. Preparations for the nationalization of these companies were carried out secretly, and on 25 March 1948, the process was implemented simultaneously. The nationalized entities included Agrolux Községeket és Mezőgazdaságokat Villamosító Rt., Villamossági és Üvegipari Rt., Orion, Remix Elektrotechnikai Gyár Kft., and Tokodi Üveggyár Rt.

This process created the risk that foreign subsidiaries and branches could be seized, potentially by former Allied states to cover war damages. There were discussions about exempting the Izzó's foreign subsidiaries from nationalization. Ultimately, the Ministry of Industry did not permit the company to write off the assets of its subsidiaries. As a result, United Incandescent Company (Egyesült Izzó) was technically considered a state-owned enterprise for only about one month.

To expand production, the company entered into cooperative agreements with several regional firms, which were later merged into the Izzó. It was also forced to produce products outside its core profile, which naturally generated losses. In 1950, the company lost its independent export rights, effectively cutting it off from its markets. Consequently, it became disconnected from market demand. Later, the company regained export rights but not independent import rights. Furthermore, exports settled in rubles were more profitable than Western exports.

== Privatization and the present ==
In 1990, following Hungary's transition to a market economy, the Hungarian government privatized several state-owned enterprises, including Tungsram. General Electric (GE) acquired a majority stake in Tungsram for $150 million, marking one of Hungary's largest privatization deals at the time. This acquisition aimed to expand GE's presence in Europe's lighting market and involved restructuring Tungsram's operations to align with GE's standards of efficiency, quality, and profitability.

Under GE's ownership, Tungsram operated as GE Lighting until 2004, when GE decided to divest its lighting division. In 2004, a consortium led by the Hungarian investment firm Mid Europa Partners acquired Tungsram from GE, re-establishing it as an independent company. The new ownership aimed to revitalize the brand and expand its product offerings beyond traditional lighting solutions.

In 2018, Tungsram underwent a management buyout, returning to Hungarian ownership. The company shifted its focus towards innovation, particularly in the fields of smart lighting and sustainable technologies. Notably, Tungsram invested in vertical farming projects, such as the establishment of a vertical farm in Budapest, to diversify its business portfolio.

However, despite efforts to modernize and diversify, Tungsram faced financial challenges. In 2022, the company filed for bankruptcy protection, citing economic difficulties and the impact of the COVID-19 pandemic on its operations. This marked a significant downturn for a company that had once been a leader in the lighting industry.
