= Jenő Landler =

Hungarian Communist leader (1875–1928)

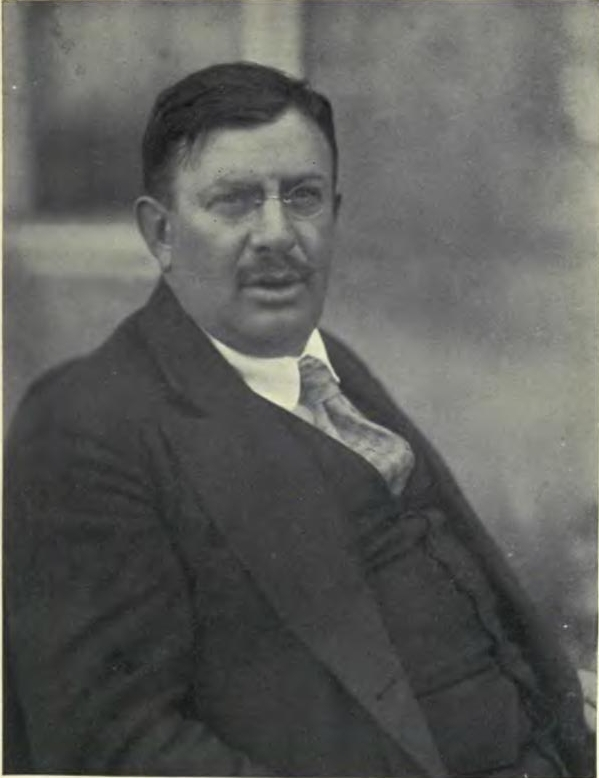
- Landler in 1919
- Born: 23 November 1875; Gelse, Austria-Hungary (now Hungary)
- Died: 25 February 1928 (aged 52); Cannes, France
- Resting place: Kremlin Wall Necropolis, Moscow
- Political party: Hungarian Communist Party; Hungarian Social Democratic Party (before 1918)
- Parent(s): Adolf Landler; Gizella Spitzer

Jenő Landler (23 November 1875 – 25 February 1928) was a Hungarian politician and socialist leader.

Born in to a Jewish family, he studied to be a lawyer and was drawn to the Social Democratic Party through his involvement in the ironworker's trade union movement. However, he kept moving politically to the left and became a Communist. After the Hungarian Revolution of 1919, he became people's commissar of interior affairs in the new communist government. He was also a commander of the Hungarian Red Army fighting the foreign troops of the interventionists. After the fall of the Hungarian Soviet Republic he emigrated to Austria where he continued to be a leader of the exiled Hungarian communist movement.

Jenő Landler died in 1928 in exile in Cannes. His ashes were taken to Moscow and placed in the Kremlin wall.

Political offices
Preceded by Vince Nagy	People's Commissar of Interior with Béla Vágó; 1919	Succeeded by Károly Peyer
