= National Assembly of Soviets =

Legislature of the Hungarian Soviet Republic

National Assembly of Soviets Tanácsok Országos Gyűlése

Type
- Type: Unicameral

History
- Established: June 14, 1919
- Disbanded: August 6, 1919
- Preceded by: Hungarian National Council
- Succeeded by: National Assembly of Hungary

Structure
- Political groups: MSZDP; KMP

Elections
- Voting system: Open single party list

Meeting place
- Hungarian Parliament Building

Constitution
- Constitution of the Hungarian Soviet Republic

The National Assembly of Soviets (Hungarian: Tanácsok Országos Gyűlése; TOGY) was the legislature of the Hungarian Soviet Republic. When the Soviet republic was overthrown in Hungary in August 1919, the Soviet Assembly was replaced by a unicameral parliament. The National Assembly of Soviets met only once between 14 and 23 June 1919. The assembly was initially made up of the Party of Communists in Hungary (KMP) led by Béla Kun and the Social Democratic Party of Hungary (MSZDP), but the social democrats abandoned the Assembly shortly after it formed.

== Sources ==
- Hajdú Tibor: Választójog 1918–1919-ben, História, 1985/056
- Magyarország a XX. században I.: Politika és társadalom, hadtörténet, jogalkotás. Főszerk. Kollega Tarsoly István. Szekszárd: Babits. 1996. 43-48. o.
- A Magyarországi Szocialista Szövetséges Tanácsköztársaság alkotmánya

=== Bibliography ===
- A Munkás-Katona-és Földmívestanácsok országos gyűlésének ügyrendje (Bp. 1919. www.ogyk.hu/e-konyvt/mpgy/hazszab.html)*
- A Tanácsok Országos Gyűlésének Naplója (Bp. 1919.)
- Hajdú Tibor: Tanácsok Magyarországon 1918-1919-ben (Bp. 1958.)
- Hajdú Tibor: A Tanácsok Országos Gyűlése. A Tanácsköztársaság alkotmánya (In: Magyarország története 1918-1919, 1919-1945. Főszerk.: Ránki György, szerk.: Hajdú Tibor és Tilkovszky Lóránt, Akadémiai Kiadó, Bp. 1978. Második kiadás, 319-321. oldal)
- Pecze Ferenc: A Tanácsok Országos Gyűlésének munkájából (In: Tanulmányok a Magyar Tanácsköztársaság államáról és jogáról, szerk.: Halász Pál, KJK, Bp. 1955. 5-56. oldal)
- Pecze Ferenc: Az országos gyűlés tárgyalási rendje különös tekintettel a küldöttek jogállására (In: A Magyar Tanácsköztársaság állama és joga. Szerk.: Sarlós Márton, Akadémiai Kiadó, Bp. 1959.)
- Pecze Ferenc: A Szövetségek Országos Gyűlésének megválasztása (In: Jogtörténeti tanulmányok III. Szerk.: Csizmadia Andor, KJK, Bp. 1974. 21-43. oldal)
- Révész T. Mihály: A szovjet típusú diktatúra első kísérlete: a Tanácsköztársaság (1919) (In: Magyar alkotmánytörténet, 447-462. oldal)
- Sarlós Márton: A Magyar Tanácsköztársaság állama és joga (Bp. 1959.)
- Szentpéteri István: A tanácsok megalakulása és jogi szabályozása a Tanácsköztársaságban (Szeged, 1957.)
- Szentpéteri István: A Magyar Tanácsköztársaság megalakulása és a tanácsok (Jogtudományi Közlöny, 1958. 3-4. szám)
