= Béla Vágó =

Hungarian politician

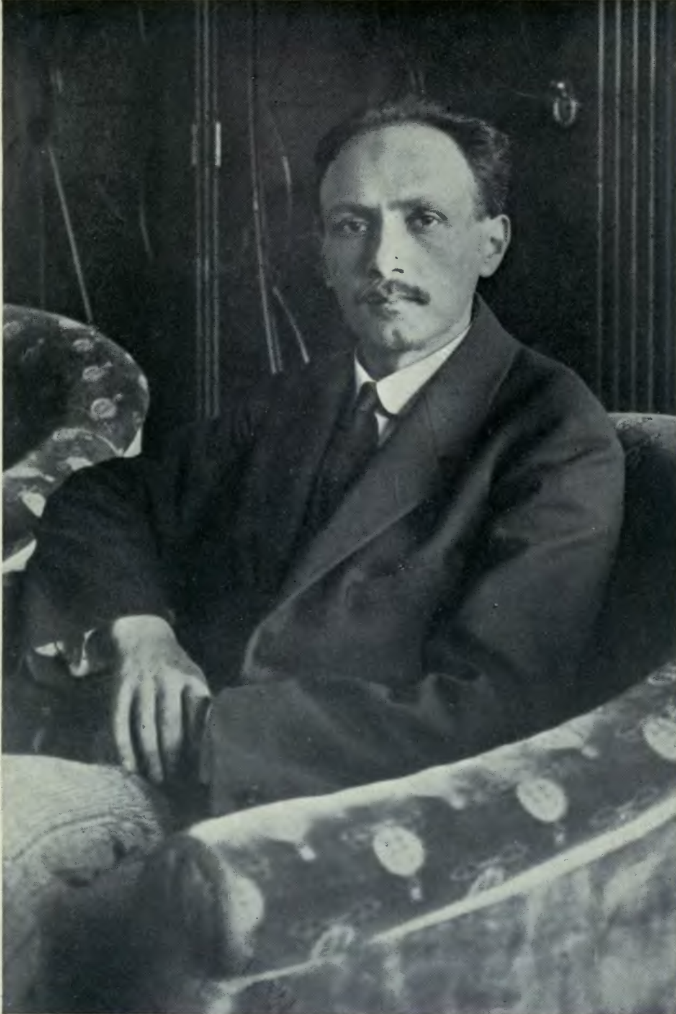
Béla Vágó, People's Commissar of the Interior

Béla Vágó (born Béla Weiss; 9 August 1881 in Kecskemét – 10 March 1939) was a Hungarian communist politician, who served as de facto Interior Minister with Jenő Landler during the Hungarian Soviet Republic. After the fall of the communist regime, he emigrated to the Soviet Union.

== Death ==
He was arrested on 28 February 1939 on fabricated charges (espionage, counter-revolutionary activity), then sentenced to death on 10 March; the sentence being executed that day. He was buried in the Donskoye Cemetery, Common Grave No. 1. He was rehabilitated on 25 February 1956.

Political offices
Preceded by Vince Nagy	People's Commissar of Interior with Jenő Landler; 1919	Succeeded by Károly Peyer
