= József Kelen =

József Kelen (born: József Klein in Nagybocskó; January 12, 1892 – March 19, 1938 in Moscow) was a Hungarian mechanical engineer, deputy commissar of the Soviet republic of Hungary, then commissar of the Soviet republic of Hungary, brother of communist politician Ottó Korvin, cousin of Pál Hajdu, husband of the politician Jolán Kelen and the founder of the Communist Party of Hungary in Budapest. He was also the brother of Ottó Korvin.

== Biography ==
His father was Zsigmond Klein, his mother was Berta Eisenstädt. He was raised in the Jewish religion. He became acquainted with the labor movement in Berlin when he was a college student. From 1910 to 1914 he worked as a lecturer at the Marxist Workers' Union. During World War I, he worked as an engineer for the electric Tram company of Budapest. He was a member of the antimilitarist movement (revolutionary socialists). He married Fried Jolán Blume on July 30, 1917, in Ferencváros, Budapest. He was one of the founding members of the Party of Communists in Hungary. The party was established in a congress held on 24 November 1918 at his apartment on Visegrádi Street. At the same congress they decided to establish the Red News weekly newspaper. Following the proclamation of the Soviet Republic of Hungary, he was appointed Deputy People's Commissioner for Social Production, and from April 1919 he became People's Commissioner and was inaugurated as a member of the National Economic Council and the Federal Central Administrative Committee. He was arrested after the fall of the Soviet Republic. His brother Ottó Korvin was executed. He was sentenced to life imprisonment in the People's Commissar's lawsuit, and in August 1922 he moved to the Soviet Union on the occasion of the Soviet-Hungarian prisoner exchange campaign. Here he worked for the Heavy Industry Commission in Moscow. From 1926 to 1931 he was head of the electrical import department of the Soviet trade mission in Berlin. After returning to the Soviet Union, he was appointed head of the planning trust (Tyeploenyergoprojekt) for thermal power plants in all of Russia. On January 14, 1938, he was arrested in Moscow on charges of espionage and involvement in counter-revolutionary activities. He was sentenced to death and executed on March 19, 1938. On November 19, 1955, Khrushchev rehabilitated him.
