= Hungarian Soviet Republic =

1919 socialist state in central Europe

Soviet Republic of Hungary Magyar Tanácsköztársaság
- 21 March – 1 August 1919
- Flag Emblem
- Motto: Világ proletárjai, egyesüljetek! "Workers of the world, unite!"
- Anthem: Internacionálé "The Internationale"
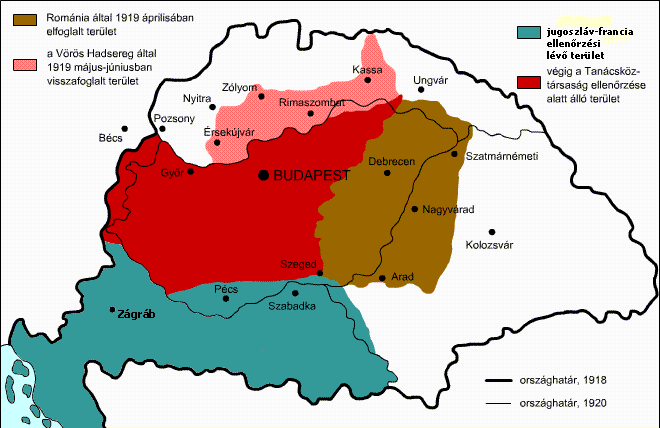
- Map of territory of the former Kingdom of Hungary, May–August 1919 Controlled by Romania in April 1919 Controlled by Soviet Hungary Subsequently controlled by Hungary to establish the Slovak Soviet Republic Controlled by French and Yugoslav forces Borders of Hungary in 1918 Borders of Hungary in 1920
- Status: Partially-recognised state
- Capital: Budapest; 47.4833°N 19.0333°E
- Common languages: Hungarian
- Demonym: Hungarian
- Government: Soviet republic
- De facto leader
  - 1919: Béla Kun (Note: Kun officially held the position of foreign minister.)
- Chairman of the Central Executive Council and Prime Minister
  - 1919: Sándor Garbai
- Legislature: National Assembly of Soviets
- Historical era: Interwar period
  - Established: 21 March 1919
  - Provisional constitution: 23 March 1919
  - Soviet elections: 7–14 April 1919
  - National Assembly of Soviets convenes: 14 June 1919
  - Permanent constitution: 23 June 1919
  - Kun resigns: 1 August 1919
  - People's Republic restored: 2 August 1919
  - Occupation of Budapest: 3 August 1919
- Currency: Hungarian korona
Preceded by	Succeeded by
First Hungarian Republic	First Hungarian Republic

The Hungarian Soviet Republic (Note: Hungarian: Magyarországi Tanácsköztársaság, lit. the Soviet Republic of Hungary, where 'Soviet' is also translatable as 'council': i.e., council republic), also known as the Socialist Federative Soviet Republic of Hungary (Note: Hungarian: Magyarországi Szocialista Szövetségi Tanácsköztársaság, also translatable as Hungarian Socialist Federative Soviet Republic) was a short-lived state that existed from 21 March 1919 to August, succeeding the First Hungarian Republic. The Hungarian Soviet Republic was a small rump state run by communists and socialists which, at its time of establishment, controlled approximately 60% of Hungarian Empire former territory. The nominal head of government was Sándor Garbai, but the de facto leader was Béla Kun, leader of the Party of Communists in Hungary. Unable to reach an agreement with the Triple Entente, which maintained an economic blockade of Hungary, in dispute with neighboring countries over territorial disputes, and beset by profound internal social changes, the Hungarian Soviet Republic failed in its objectives and was abolished a few months after its foundation. Its main figure was the communist Béla Kun, despite the fact that in the first days the majority of the new government consisted of radical Social Democrats. The new system effectively concentrated power in the governing councils, which exercised it in the name of the working class. (Note: It followed the Bolshevik model of Soviet Russia but without the direct participation of the workers' councils (soviets) from which it took its name.)

The new Communist government failed to reach an agreement with the Triple Entente that would lead to the lifting of the economic blockade, the improvement of the new borders or the recognition of the new government by the victorious powers of World War I. A small volunteer army was organized mostly from Budapest factory workers and attempts were made to recover the territories lost to neighboring countries, an objective that had widespread support from many working-class people in some larger cities, not only by those favorable to the new regime. Initially, thanks to patriotic support from conservative officers, the republican forces advanced against the Czechoslovaks in north Hungary, after suffering a defeat in the east at the hands of the Romanian Army in late April, which led to a retreat on the banks of the Tisza. In mid-June, the birth of the Slovak Soviet Republic was proclaimed, which lasted two weeks until a Hungarian withdrawal at the request of the Triple Entente. Later that month, there was an attempted coup by the Social Democrats of Budapest, which was put down by the communist government. On 20 July, the republic launched a new attack on the Romanian posts who were deep in Hungary at the Tisza river. After a few days of the Hungarian advance, the Romanians managed to stop the offensive and break through the Hungarian lines. Kun and most of the government fled to Vienna. The Social-Democrat–Communist government was succeeded by an exclusively Social Democratic one on 1 August. The communists left Budapest and went abroad. Despite the opposition from the Entente, the Romanians entered Budapest, the Hungarian capital, on 4 August.

The Hungarian heads of government applied controversial doctrinal measures in both foreign (internationalism instead of national interests during wartime) and domestic policy (planned economy and heightened class struggle) that made them lose the favor of the majority of the population. The attempt of the new executive to profoundly change the lifestyle and the system of values of the population proved to be a resounding failure; After the withdrawal from Slovakia, the application of some measures aimed at regaining popular support was ordered, but without great success; in particular, the ban on the sale of alcoholic beverages was repealed, and attempts were made to improve the monetary situation and food supply. Unable to apply these policies effectively, the republic had already lost the support of the majority of the population between June and July, which led, together with the military defeats, to its downfall. The failure of internal reform was compounded by the political and economic isolation imposed on Hungary by the Triple Entente, the military failures against neighboring countries, and the impossibility of joining forces with the Red Army because of the ongoing Russian Civil War contributed to the collapse of the Soviet Republic.

== World War I and the First Hungarian Republic ==
=== Political and military situation ===
Austria-Hungary's Habsburg monarchy collapsed in 1918, and the independent First Hungarian Republic was formed after the Aster Revolution. The official proclamation of the republic was on 16 November and the liberal Count Mihály Károlyi became its president. Károlyi struggled to establish the government's authority and to control the country. The Hungarian Royal Honvéd army still had more than 1,400,000 soldiers when Károlyi was announced as prime minister of Hungary. Károlyi yielded to United States president Woodrow Wilson's demand for pacifism by ordering the unilateral self-disarmament of the Hungarian Army. This happened under the direction of Minister of War Béla Linder, on 2 November 1918. Due to the unilateral disarmament of its army, Hungary was to remain without a national defence at a time of particular vulnerability. The Hungarian self-disarmament made the occupation of Hungary directly possible for the relatively small armies of Romania, the Franco-Serbian army and the armed forces of the newly established Czechoslovakia.

On the request of the Austro-Hungarian government, an armistice was granted to Austria-Hungary on 3 November by the Allies. Military and political events changed rapidly and drastically thereafter. On 5 November, the Serbian Army, with the help of the French Army, crossed southern borders. On 8 November, the Czechoslovak Army crossed the northern borders. On 13 November, the Romanian Army crossed the eastern borders of the Kingdom of Hungary. During the rule of Károlyi's pacifist cabinet, Hungary lost control over approximately 75% of its former pre-World War I territories (325,411 km^{2}) without armed resistance and was subject to foreign occupation. For their part, the neighboring countries used the so-called "struggle against communism", first against the capitalist and liberal government of Count Mihály Károlyi and later against the soviet republic of communist Bela Kun, as a justification for their expansionist ambitions.

=== Formation of the Communist Party ===
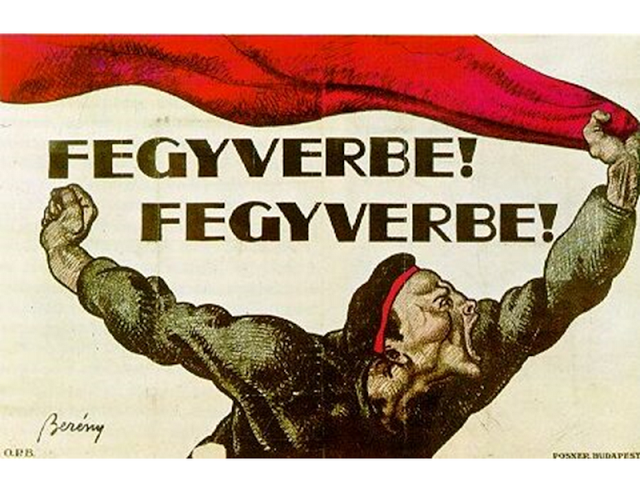
Hungarian communist propaganda poster from 1919 reads: "To Arms! To Arms!"

An initial nucleus of a Party of Communists in Hungary had been organized in a hotel on 4 November 1918, when a group of former Hungarian prisoners of war and other communist proponents formed a Central Committee in the downtown of Moscow. Led by Béla Kun, the inner circle of the freshly established party returned to Budapest from Moscow on 16 November. On 24 November, they created the Party of Communists from Hungary (Hungarian: Kommunisták Magyarországi Pártja, KMP). The name was chosen instead of the Hungarian Communist Party because the vast majority of supporters were from the urban industrial working class in Hungary which at the time was largely made up of people from non-Hungarian ethnic backgrounds, with ethnic Hungarians a minority in the new party itself. The party recruited members while propagating its ideas, radicalising many members of the Social Democratic Party of Hungary in the process. By February 1919, the party numbered 30,000 to 40,000 members, including many unemployed ex-soldiers, young intellectuals and ethnic minorities.

Kun founded a newspaper, called Vörös Újság (Red News) and concentrated on attacking Károlyi's liberal government. The party became popular among the Budapest proletariat, it also promised that Hungary would be able to defend its territory even without conscription. Kun promised military help and intervention of the Soviet Red Army, which never came, against non-communist Romanian, Czechoslovak, French and Yugoslav forces. During the following months, the Communist party's power-base rapidly expanded. Its supporters began to stage aggressive demonstrations against the media and against the Social Democratic Party. The Communists considered the Social Democrats as their main rivals, because the Social Democrats recruited their political supporters from the same social class: the industrial working class of the cities. In one crucial incident, a demonstration turned violent on 20 February and the protesters attacked the editorial office of the Social Democratic Party of Hungary's official newspaper called Népszava (People's Word). In the ensuing chaos, seven people, some policemen, were killed. The government arrested the leaders of the Communist party, banned its daily newspaper Vörös Újság, and closed down the party's buildings. The arrests were particularly violent, with police officers openly beating the communists. This resulted in a wave of public sympathy for the party among the masses of Budapester proletariat. On 1 March, Vörös Újság was given permission to publish again, and the Communist party's premises were re-opened. The leaders were permitted to receive guests in prison, which allowed them to keep up with political affairs.

== Communist rule ==
=== Coup d'état ===
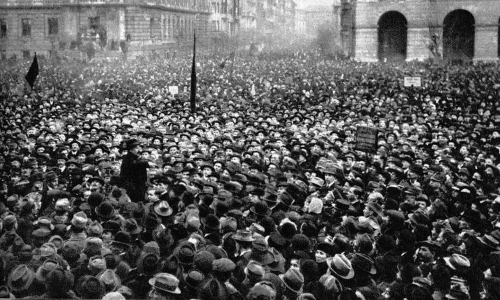
Proclamation of the Hungarian Soviet Republic, 21 March 1919

On 20 March, Károlyi announced that the government of Prime Minister Dénes Berinkey would resign. Károlyi and Berinkey had been placed in an untenable situation when they received a note from Paris, the Vix Note, ordering Hungarian troops to further withdraw their lines. It was widely assumed that the new military lines would be the postwar boundaries. The presentation of the Vix Note proved fatal to the government, which was by then devoid of significant support. Károlyi and Berinkey concluded that they were not in a position to reject the note although they believed that accepting it would endanger Hungary's territorial integrity. On 21 March, Károlyi informed the Council of Ministers that only Social Democrats could form a new government, as they were the party with the highest public support in the largest cities and especially in Budapest. To form a governing coalition, the Social Democrats started secret negotiations with the Communist leaders, who were still imprisoned, and decided to merge their two parties under the name of the Hungarian Socialist Party. President Károlyi, who was an outspoken anticommunist, was not informed about the merger. Thus, he swore in what he believed to be a Social Democratic government, only to find himself faced with one dominated by Communists. Károlyi resigned on 21 March. Béla Kun and his fellow communists were released from the Margit Ring prison on the night of 20 March. The liberal president Károlyi was arrested by the new Communist government on the first day; in July, he managed to make his escape and flee to Paris.

For the Social Democrats, an alliance with the KMP not only increased their standing with the industrial working class but also gave them a potential link to the increasingly powerful Russian Communist Party (Bolsheviks), as Kun had strong ties with prominent Russian Bolsheviks. Following Vladimir Lenin's model but without the direct participation of the workers' councils (soviets) from which it took its name, the newly united Socialist Party created a government called the Revolutionary Governing Council, which proclaimed the Hungarian Soviet Republic and dismissed President Károlyi on 21 March. In a radio dispatch to the Russian SFSR, Kun informed Lenin that a dictatorship of the proletariat had been established in Hungary and asked for a treaty of alliance with the Russian SFSR. The Russian SFSR refused because it was itself tied down in the Russian Civil War. On 23 March, Lenin gave an order to Béla Kun that Social Democrats must be removed from power, so that Hungary could be transformed into a socialist state ruled by a "dictatorship of the proletariat". Accordingly, the Communists started to purge the Social Democrats from the government on the next day.

=== Garbai government ===
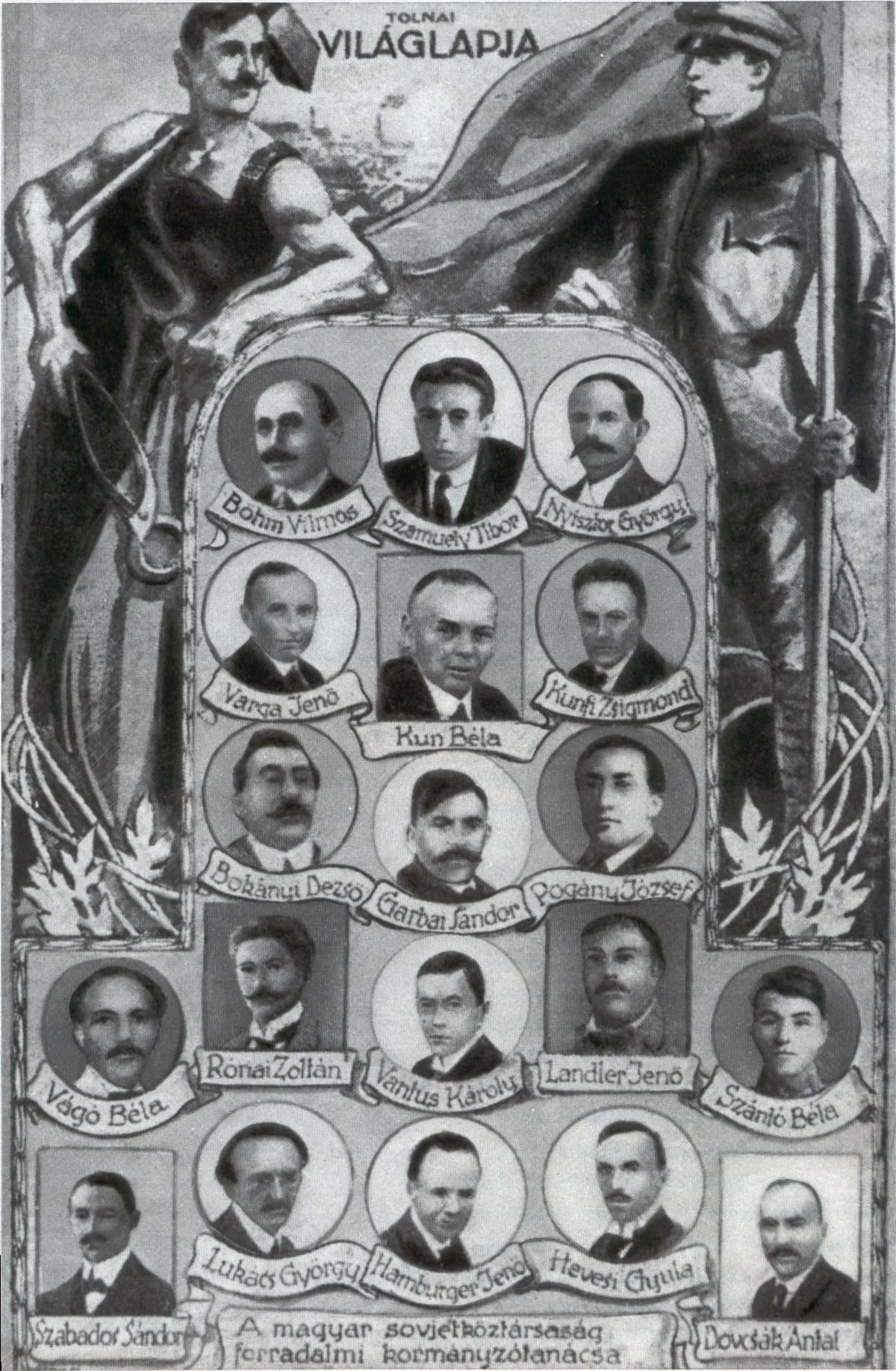
The government of the Hungarian Soviet Republic from left to right: Vilmos Böhm, Tibor Szamuely, György Nyisztor, Jenő Varga, Béla Kun, Zsigmond Kunfi, Dezső Bokányi, Sándor Garbai, József Pogány, Béla Vágó, Zoltán Rónai, Károly Vántus, Jenő Landler, Béla Szántó, Sándor Szabados, György Lukács, Jenő Hamburger, Gyula Hevesi, and Antal Dovcsák.

The government was formally led by Sándor Garbai, but Kun, as the Commissar of Foreign Affairs, held the real power because only Kun had the acquaintance and friendship with Lenin. He was the only person in the government who met and talked to the Bolshevik leader during the Russian Revolution, and Kun kept the contact with the Kremlin via radio communication. The ministries, often rotated among the various members of the government, were:

- Sándor Garbai – president and prime minister of the Hungarian Soviet Republic
- Jenő Landler – commissar of the interior
- Sándor Csizmadia, Károly Vántus, Jenő Hamburger, and György Nyisztor – commissars of agriculture
- József Pogány, later also Rezső Fiedler, József Haubrich and Béla Szántó – commissars of Defense
- Zoltán Rónai, later also István Láday – commissars of Justice
- Jenő Landler – commissar of trade
- Mór Erdélyi, later also Bernát Kondor – commissars of food
- Zsigmond Kunfi, later also György Lukács, Tibor Szamuely, and Sándor Szabados – commissars of education
- Béla Kun – commissar of foreign affairs
- Dezső Bokányi – commissar of labor
- Henrik Kalmár – commissar of German affairs
- Jenő Varga, later also Gyula Lengyel – commissars of Finance
- Vilmos Böhm – commissar for socialism, later also Antal Dovcsák

After the declaration of the constitution changes took place in the commissariat. The new ministries were:

- Jenő Varga, Mátyás Rákosi, Gyula Hevesi, József Kelen, Ferenc Bajáki – commissars of economic production
- Jenő Landler, Béla Vágó – commissars of internal affairs, railways and navigation
- Béla Kun, Péter Ágoston and József Pogány – commissars of Foreign Affairs

=== Policies ===
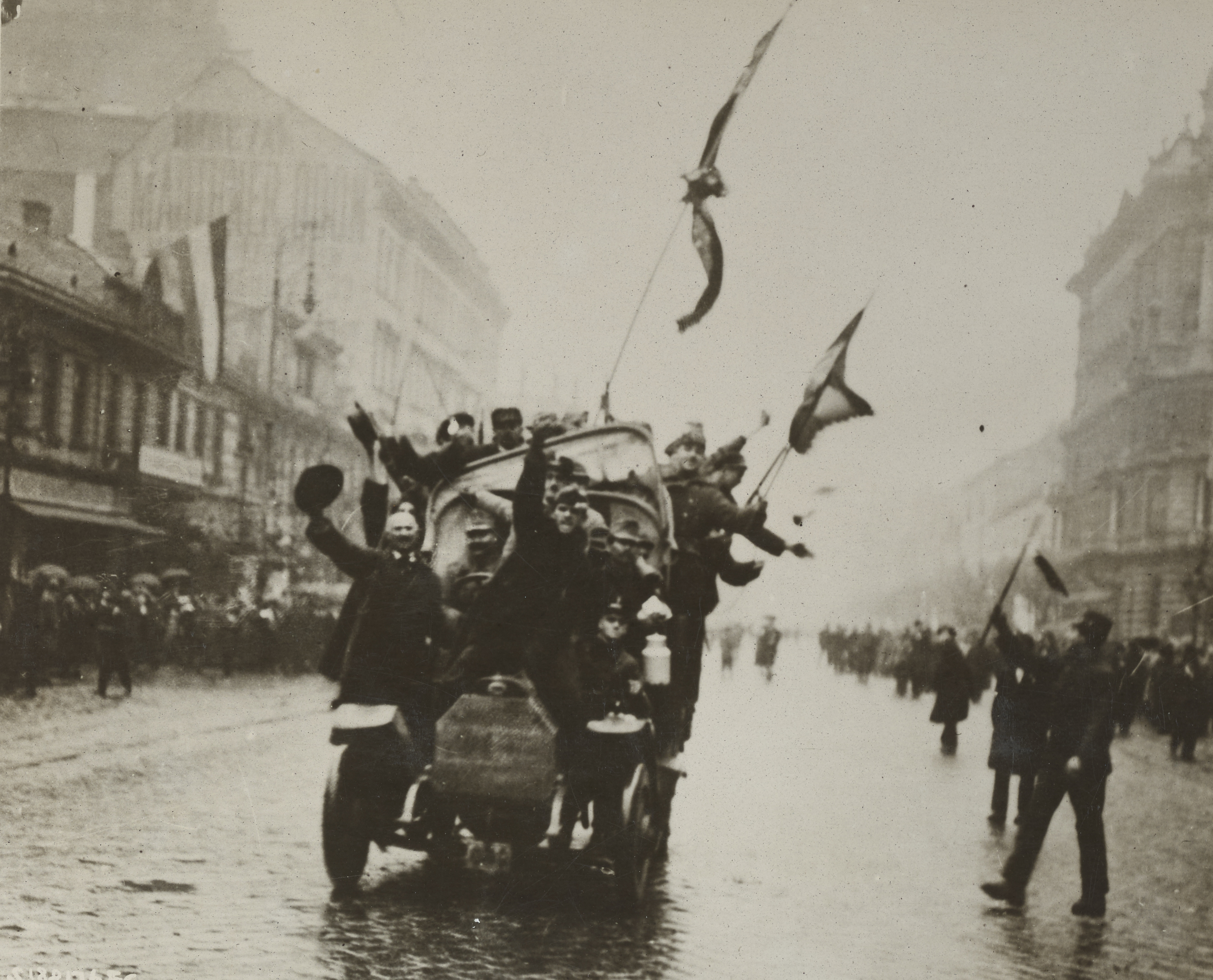
An automobile loaded with communists dashing through streets of Budapest, March 1919

This government consisted of a coalition of socialists and communists, but with the exception of Kun, all commissars were former social democrats. Under the rule of Kun, the new government, which had adopted in full the program of the Communists, decreed the abolition of aristocratic titles and privileges, the separation of church and state, codified freedom of assembly and freedom of speech, and implemented free education and language and cultural rights to minorities.

The Communist government also nationalized industrial and commercial enterprises and socialized housing, transport, banking, medicine, cultural institutions, and all landholdings of more than 40 hectares. Public support for the Communists was also heavily dependent on their promise of restoring Hungary's former borders. The government took steps toward normalizing foreign relations with the Triple Entente powers in an effort to gain back some of the lands that Hungary was set to lose in the post-war negotiations. The Communists remained bitterly unpopular in the Hungarian countryside, where the authority of that government was often nonexistent. The Communist party and their policies had real popular support among only the proletarian masses of large industrial centers, especially in Budapest, where the working class represented a high proportion of the inhabitants.

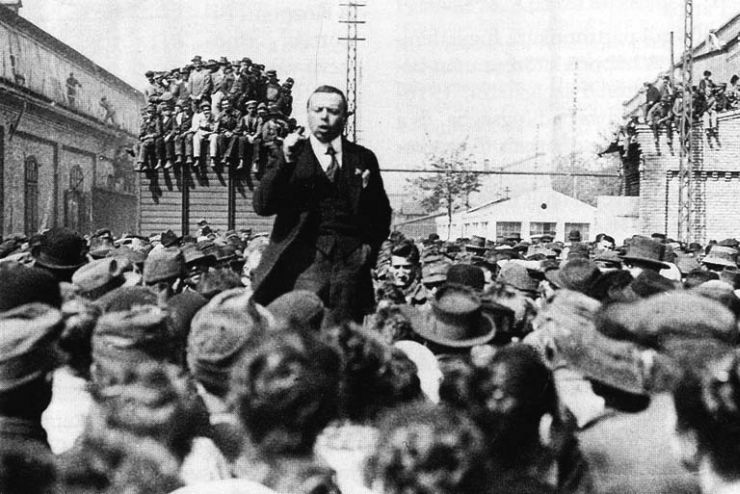
Béla Kun, the de facto leader of the Hungarian Soviet Republic

The Hungarian government was left on its own, and a Red Guard was established under the command of Mátyás Rákosi. In addition, a group of 200 armed men known as the Lenin Boys formed a mobile detachment under the leadership of József Cserny. This detachment was deployed at various locations around the country where counter-revolutionary movements were suspected to operate. The Lenin Boys as well as other similar groups and agitators killed and terrorised many people (e.g. armed with hand grenades and using their rifles' butts they disbanded religious ceremonies). They executed victims without trial, and this caused a number of conflicts with the local population, some of which turned violent. The situation of the Hungarian Communists began to deteriorate in the capital city Budapest after a failed coup by the Social Democrats on 24 June; the newly composed Communist government of Sándor Garbai resorted to large-scale reprisals. Revolutionary tribunals ordered executions of people who were suspected of having been involved in the attempted coup. This became known as the Red Terror, and greatly reduced domestic support for the government even among the working classes of the highly industrialized suburb districts and metropolitan area of Budapest.

=== Foreign policy scandal and downfall ===
Mass celebration of the Hungarian Red Army's march to Kassa (Košice) during the Hungarian–Czechoslovak War

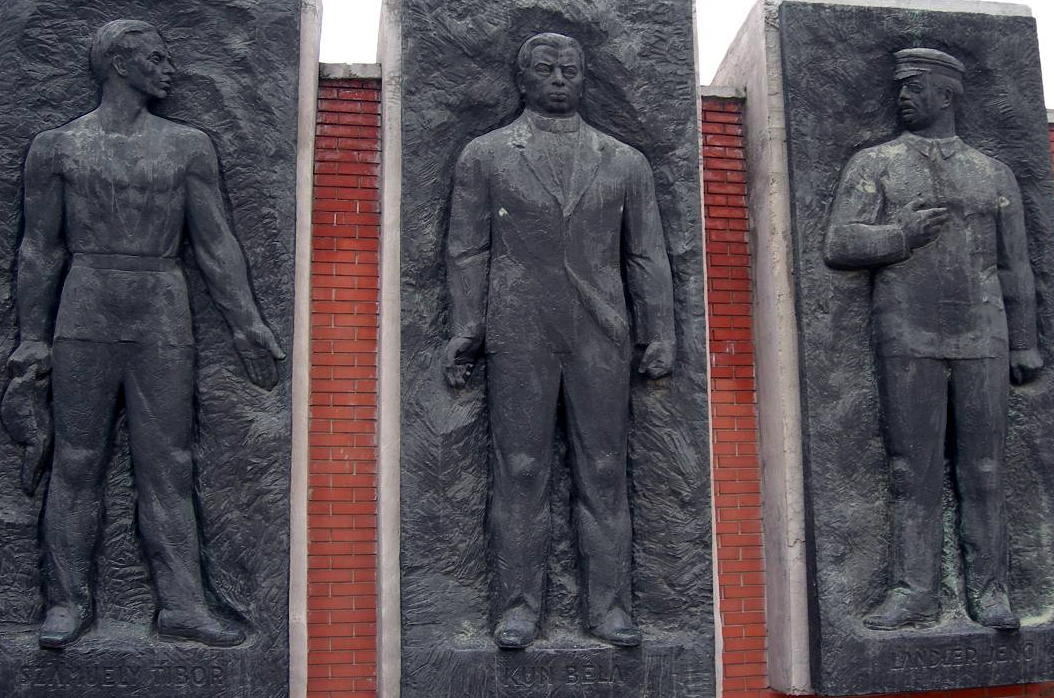
Leaders of the Hungarian Soviet Republic: Tibor Szamuely, Béla Kun, Jenő Landler (left to right). The monument is now located at the Memento Park open-air museum outside Budapest.

In late May, after the Entente military representative demanded more territorial concessions from Hungary, Kun attempted to fulfill his promise to adhere to Hungary's historical borders. The men of the Hungarian Red Army were recruited from the volunteers of the Budapest proletariat. In June, the Hungarian Red Army invaded the eastern part of the newly forming Czechoslovak state (today's Slovakia), the former so-called Upper Hungary. The Hungarian Red Army achieved some military success early on: under the leadership of Colonel Aurél Stromfeld, it ousted Czech troops from the north, and planned to march against the Romanian Army in the east. Despite promises for the restoration of the former borders of Hungary, the Communists declared the establishment of the Slovak Soviet Republic in Prešov on 16 June.

After the proclamation of the Slovak Soviet Republic, the Hungarian nationalists and patriots soon realized that the new communist government had no intention of recapturing the lost territories, only in spreading communist ideology and the establishment of other communist states in Europe, thus sacrificing Hungarian national interests. The Hungarian patriots in the Red Army and the professional military officers saw this as a betrayal, and their support for the government began to erode (the communists and their government supported the establishment of the Slovak Communist state, while the Hungarian patriots wanted to keep the reoccupied territories for Hungary). Despite a series of military victories against the Czechoslovak army, the Hungarian Red Army started to disintegrate due to tension between nationalists and communists during the establishment of the Slovak Soviet Republic. The concession eroded support of the communist government among professional military officers and nationalists in the Hungarian Red Army; even the chief of the general staff Aurél Stromfeld, resigned his post in protest.

When the French promised the Hungarian government that Romanian forces would withdraw from the Tiszántúl, Kun withdrew his remaining military units who had remained loyal after the political fiasco in Upper Hungary; however, following the Red Army's retreat from the north, the Romanian forces were not pulled back. Kun then unsuccessfully tried to turn the remaining units of the demoralized Hungarian Red Army on the Romanians with Hungarian-Romanian War of 1919. The Hungarian Soviet found it increasingly difficult to fight Romania with its small force of communist volunteers from Budapest, and support for both the war and the Communist party was waning at home. After the demoralizing retreat from northern Hungary (later part of Czechoslovakia), only the most dedicated Hungarian Communists volunteered for combat, and the Romanian Army broke through the weak lines of the Hungarian Red Army on 30 July.

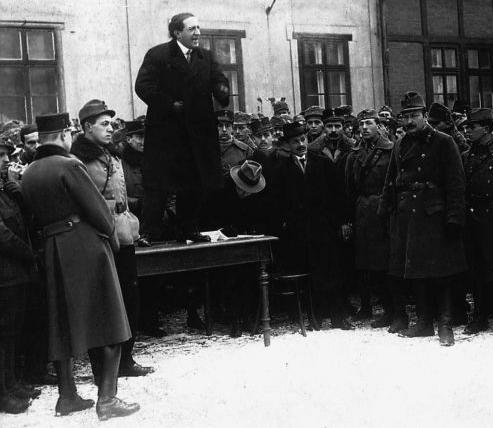
József Pogány speaking to soldiers

Béla Kun, together with other high-ranking Communists, fled to Vienna on 1 August with only a minority, including György Lukács, the former Commissar for Culture and noted Marxist philosopher, remaining to organise an underground Communist party. Before they fled to Vienna, Kun and his followers took along numerous art treasures and the gold stocks of the National Bank. The Budapest Workers' Soviet elected a new government, headed by Gyula Peidl, which lasted only a few days before Romanian forces entered Budapest on 6 August.

In the power vacuum created by the fall of the soviet republic and the presence of the Romanian Army, semi-regular detachments (technically under Horthy's command, but mostly independent in practice) initiated a campaign of violence against communists, leftists, and Jews, known as the White Terror. Many supporters of the Hungarian Soviet Republic were executed without trial; others, including Péter Ágoston, Ferenc Bajáki, Dezső Bokányi, Antal Dovcsák, József Haubrich, Kalmár Henrik, Kelen József, György Nyisztor, Sándor Szabados, and Károly Vántus, were imprisoned by trial ("comissar suits"). Actor Béla Lugosi, the founder of the country's National Trade Union of Actors (the world's first film actor's union), managed to escape. Most were later released to the Soviet Union by amnesty during the reign of Horthy, after a prisoner exchange agreement between Hungary and the Russian Soviet government in 1921. In all, about 415 prisoners were released as a result of this agreement.

Kun himself, along with an unknown number of other Hungarian communists, were executed during Joseph Stalin's Great Purge of the late 1930s in the Soviet Union, to which they had fled in the 1920s. Mátyás Rákosi, one of the surviving members of the government, would go on to be the first leader of the second and longer-lasting attempt at a Communist state in Hungary, the People's Republic of Hungary, from 1949 to 1956.

== See also ==
- Aftermath of World War I
- Hungarian Revolution of 1956
- Red Terror
- Hungarian Red Terror
- Revolutions of 1917–1923

== Bibliography ==
- Balogh, Eva S. (1975). "Romanian and Allied Involvement in the Hungarian Coup d'Etat of 1919". East European Quarterly. 9 (3): 297–314. ISSN 0012-8449.
- Balogh, Eva S. (March 1976). "The Hungarian Social Democratic Centre and the Fall of Béla Kun". Canadian Slavonic Papers. 18 (1). Taylor & Francis: 15–35. doi:10.1080/00085006.1976.11091436. JSTOR 40867035.
- Bodo, Bela (October 2010). "Hungarian Aristocracy and the White Terror". Journal of Contemporary History. 45 (4). SAGE Publications: 703–724. doi:10.1177/0022009410375255. JSTOR 25764578. S2CID 154963526.
- Juhász, Gyula (1979). Hungarian Foreign Policy, 1919–1945. Akadémiai Kiadó. ISBN 978-96-30-51882-6.
- Janos, Andrew C.; Slottman, William B. (1971). Revolution in Perspective: Essays on the Hungarian Soviet Republic of 1919. University of California Press. ISBN 978-05-20-01920-1.
- Janos, Andrew C. (1981). The Politics of Backwardness in Hungary, 1825–1945. Princeton University Press. ISBN 978-06-91-10123-1.
- Király, Béla K.; Pastor, Peter (1988). War and Society in East Central Europe. Columbia University Press. ISBN 978-08-80-33137-1.
- Mocsy, Istvan I. (1983). "The Uprooted: Hungarian Refugees and Their Impact on Hungary's Domestic Politics, 1918–1921". East European Monographs. doi:10.2307/2499355. ISBN 978-08-80-33039-8. JSTOR 2499355.
- Pastor, Peter (1976). "Hungary Between Wilson and Lenin". East European Monograph. doi:10.2307/2495009. ISBN 978-09-14-710134. JSTOR 2495009. S2CID 165079665.
- Szilassy, Sándor (1969). "Hungary at the Brink of the Cliff 1918–1919". East European. 1 (3): 95–109. ISSN 0012-8449.
- Szilassy, Sándor (1971). Revolutionary Hungary 1918–1921. Aston Park, Florida: Danubian Press. ISBN 978-08-79-34005-6.
- Swanson, John C. (2017). Tangible Belonging: Negotiating Germanness in Twentieth-Century Hungary. University of Pittsburgh Press. ISBN 978-0-8229-8199-2.
- Völgyes, Iván (1970). "The Hungarian Dictatorship of 1919: Russian Example versus Hungarian Reality". East European Quarterly. 1 (4). ISSN 0012-8449.
- Völgyes, Iván (1971). Hungary in Revolution, 1918–1919: Nine Essays. University of Nebraska Press. ISBN 978-08-03-20788-2.
- Zsuppán, Ferenc Tibor (June 1965). "The Early Activities of the Hungarian Communist Party, 1918–19". The Slavonic and East European Review. 43 (101): 314–334. ISSN 0037-6795. JSTOR 4205656.
