= József Cserny =

Hungarian revolutionary (1892–1919)

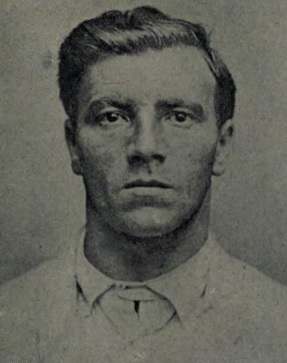
- Born: 18 March 1892; Budapest, Austria-Hungary
- Died: 18 December 1919 (aged 27); Budapest, Hungarian Republic
- Cause of death: Execution by hanging
- Known for: Commander of the Lenin Boys
- Status: Executed
- Convictions: Murder (9 counts); Embezzlement
- Penalty: Death

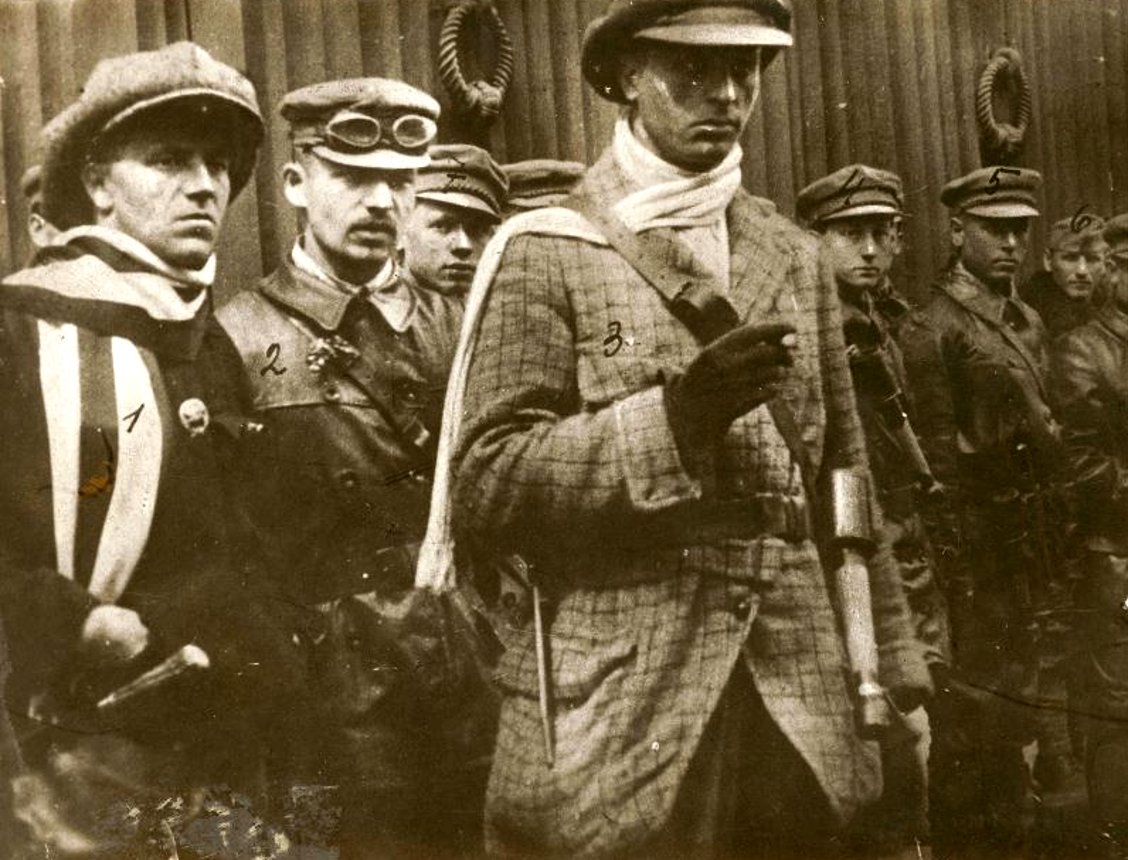
Cserny (left) alongside the Lenin Boys.

József Cserny (18 March 1892 – 18 December 1919) was a Hungarian communist revolutionary who was commander of the Lenin Boys during the Hungarian Soviet Republic and was a leading participant in the Red Terror.

Cserny was tried for murder and executed following the Republic's fall.

== Early life ==
József Cserny was born on March 18, 1892, in Budapest into a working-class family. His father was a Catholic carpenter and his mother a Protestant day laborer. He was baptized on December 13, 1892, in the Kálvin Square Reformed Church in Budapest.

Cserny learned to speak both German and Dalmatian and worked as a shoemaker until he served in the Austro-Hungarian Navy in the First World War. In 1918, he escaped to Soviet Russia, where he joined the group of Hungarian communists. He became a student at an agitator training school. In November 1918, following the news of the Aster Revolution, the Hungarian Communists in Russia founded the Hungarian Party of Communists.

== Revolutionary activities ==
By December 1918, he had returned to Hungary and joined the sailor detachment of guards, protecting the headquarters of the communist party. The group was autonomous, and only accepted orders that they agreed with, taking orders directly from the communist party leadership. In addition to his role as a paramilitary commander, Cserny also oversaw some trials held in the revolutionary tribunals of the new Soviet Republic.

By March, the Communist Party and the Social Democratic Party had established the Hungarian Soviet Republic. Cserny was commanding over two hundred men, who acted as a gendarmerie force in Budapest. During the first days of the Red Terror, Cserny's men killed over a dozen people, most notably state secretary Sándor Hollán Sr. and his son Sándor Hollán Jr who were shot on Cserny's orders before being dumped into the Danube river. Civilians were regularly attacked by the group for perceived "counter revolutionary activities" and were murdered for offenses such as saluting the old national flag, or smiling at a member of the Lenin Boys, which was perceived as an insult. Cserny also arrested, tortured, and hanged people associated with the old government, without trial, on orders from Communist officials.

At the end of April 1919, the new commander-in-chief of the army, the social democrat Vilmos Böhm, issued an order to disband all "political terrorist groups or separate groups operating under other names." Cserny's group was called to surrender their weapons, ammunition, vehicles, and their headquarters. After an unsuccessful counter-revolutionary insurgency organized by a number of naval cadets occurred on June, Cserny urgently requested Béla Kun to rearm the group. After his group was reorganized and re-armed, he continued the group's terrorist activities.

== Arrest and trial ==
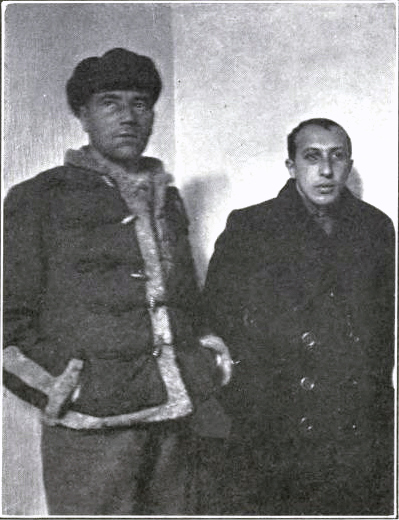
József Cserny and Otto Korvin in prison, 1919.

After the Soviet Republic was defeated on 1 August 1919, the communist leadership fled shortly after, however, Cserny and many members of the Lenin Boys remained in Hungary and continued to fight. On August 4, he was arrested by members of the Red Guard. On August 29, 1919, he was transported from the detention center to the Margit körút Prison, where he was interrogated.

On 4 September 1919, deputy attorney general Albert Váry submitted an indictment to the Budapest Criminal Court against twenty-six defendants of the previous Soviet regime. The trial began on November 24, and on December 11, Cserny was found guilty of nine counts of murder and of embezzlement. He was among the fourteen defendants that were sentenced to death. The day before his execution, Cserny made his last will and met with a Reformed priest. He was the last one hanged in the prison yard on 18 December 1919.
