= Sándor Hollán =

Sándor Hollán may refer to:

- Sándor Hollán, Sr., Hungarian politician (1846-1919)
- Sándor Hollán, Jr., Hungarian politician (1873-1919)
- Sándor Hollán (painter) (Alexandre Hollan), Hungarian-French painter (b. 1933)
