= Eugen Varga =

Hungarian communist revolutionary, Soviet economist (1879–1964)

- Евгений Варга
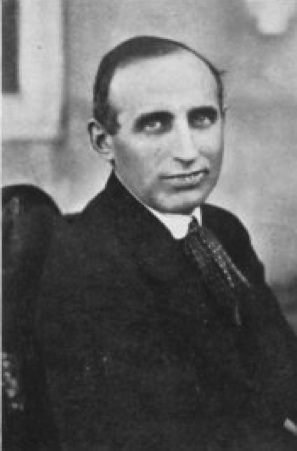

People's Commissar of Finance of the Hungarian Soviet Republic
- In office 21 March 1919 – 3 April 1919
- Prime Minister: Sándor Garbai
- Preceded by: Position established (Pál Szende as minister of finance)
- Succeeded by: Béla Székely

Personal details
- Born: Eugen Weiss; 6 November 1879 Budapest, Hungary, Austria-Hungary
- Died: 7 October 1964 (aged 84) Moscow, Russian SFSR, Soviet Union
- Party: Hungarian Communist Party; Communist Party of the Soviet Union
- Education: University of Budapest (PhD, 1909)

Eugen Samuilovich Varga (Note: In this name that follows East Slavic naming customs, the patronymic is Samuilovich and the family name is Varga.) (Note: Hungarian: Jenő Varga, Russian: Евгений Самуилович Варга, romanised: Yevgeny Samuilovich Varga) (né Weiss; (Note: Hungarian: Weisz) 6 November 1879 – 7 October 1964) was a Hungarian communist revolutionary and Soviet economist who served as People's Commissar of Finance during the Hungarian Soviet Republic. After the overthrow of the Soviet Republic, he fled to the Soviet Union, where he served as an advisor to Soviet leader Joseph Stalin on economic matters.

== Biography ==
=== Early years ===
Varga was born Eugen Weiss (Hungarian: Jenő Weisz) to a poor Jewish family, as a son of Samuel Weiss—a teacher in the primary school of Nagytétény—and Julianna Singer. Eugen "Jenő" Varga studied philosophy and economic geography at the University of Budapest, completing a PhD in 1909. He also studied in Berlin and Paris. In 1906, he started writing in socialist and academic journals, mainly on economic subjects. Before World War I, he gained some fame by discussing the origins of inflation in Austria-Hungary with Otto Bauer. In this period, he belonged to the Marxist Centrists, of whom Karl Kautsky and Rudolf Hilferding were the most prominent spokesmen.

=== Hungarian revolution ===
In February 1919, Varga joined the newly created Hungarian Communist Party. During the short-lived Hungarian Soviet Republic of 1919, led by Béla Kun, he was People's Commissar for Finance (21 March–3 April), and then chairman of the Supreme Council of National Economy. After the overthrow of the Soviet Republic, he fled to Vienna.

=== Soviet emigration ===
In 1920, he went to the Soviet Union with Arthur Holitscher. Here, he started working for the Comintern, specializing in international economic problems and agrarian questions. During 1922–1927, he was working at the department of trade in the Soviet embassy in Berlin. From 1927 to 1947, he was the director of the Institute of World Economy and World Politics. In the 1930s, he became an economic adviser to Joseph Stalin. He survived the purges of the 1930s, during which Béla Kun and other Hungarians were executed.

During World War II, he advised the Soviet government in matters of post-war reparations. He attended the Potsdam Conference of 1945 as an expert. Like most of his compatriots living and working in Moscow, he joined the Communist Party of the Soviet Union, but he also remained active in the Hungarian Communist Party.

He authored the economic reports that the Comintern congresses discussed between 1921 and 1935. Many of his writings were studies of the international economic conjuncture, in which he made great effort to assess quantitative trends in output, investment, and employment using official economic data from numerous countries. He also extensively studied German imperialism.

=== Personality ===
In 1922, Alexander Barmine, a Soviet diplomat who later defected to the west, travelled by train to Moscow with delegates to the Fourth Congress of Comintern, including Varga, who "showed the most revolting lack of consideration" by demanding a private railway compartment. Barmine considered that he should have content with a berth in a first class carriage. He wrote: "The little luxuries of power go to men's heads."

Another Soviet defector Abdurakhman Avtorkhanov, writing under the pseudonym Alexander Uralov, left a humorous description of Varga, whom he described as having "the pedantry of a German official, the obstinacy of a Russian accountant, and the suppleness of an Oriental fakir", and of his institute, where "share fluctuations were followed more attentively than in any London or New York bank. The most brilliant member of the Stock Exchange would have envied the way in which Varga was kept informed."

=== Post-war controversy ===
In 1946, Varga published The Economic Transformation of Capitalism at the End of the Second World War, in which he argued that during the war, Western governments had accumulated great power over the management of capitalist economies, which brought them closer to socialist economies and made them more likely to last. He was praised by Kremlin watchers in the West as a "person with a Western orientation" and a "defender" of the Marshall Plan, but "these implications were highly distasteful to Soviet conservatives" who believed that capitalism was heading for an extreme and possibly terminal crisis. During a closed meeting of economists called by the USSR Academy of Sciences and Moscow University, in May 1947, "Varga was attacked for his writings by most, if not all, of the participants."

He was also attacked by Nikolai Voznesensky, then an influential figure as chairman of Gosplan and a member of the Politburo of the Communist Party of the Soviet Union, who wrote a book in which he accused "certain theoreticians" of having "empty opinions which deserve no consideration". Varga's book was condemned at a meeting of economists and political experts in May 1947, and the institute he headed was closed and subsumed into Gosplan. Although he remained a leading academic economist, his prestige had diminished — in the second edition of the Great Soviet Encyclopedia he was qualified as a "bourgeois economist" — but the fact that he was not dismissed or arrested implies that he had powerful protectors. In March 1949, Voznesensky was arrested, and two days later, on 15 March, Varga published a self-critical letter in Pravda.

=== Post-Stalin years ===
After Stalin's death in 1953, Varga reappeared on the scene. In February 1956, he wrote an article in Pravda that rehabilitated Béla Kun. The new leaders in the Kremlin, believing in the virtues of peaceful co-existence, were not interested in Varga's predictions of the outbreak of a "necessary" economic crisis in the United States. After his death, his selected works in three volumes were published in the Soviet Union, Hungary and East Germany.

Varga never returned to living in his native Hungary. Because he was very close to Mátyás Rákosi, he was invited as an economic advisor to Hungary several times. In this period (1945–1950), he had specialized in economic planning, pricing, and monetary reforms (i.e., reforms that the Hungarian communists, now in power, were carrying out). After the fall of Rákosi caused by the Hungarian revolution of 1956 and the takeover by János Kádár, Varga's advisory work was no longer fashionable.

=== Death and legacy ===
Varga died 7 October 1964 in Moscow at the age of 84.

During his life, Varga made use of dictation to secretaries to conduct his writing, enabling him to produce a vast amount of published work. This work process allowed Varga to produce a massive literary output, including 80 books and pamphlets and more than 1,300 articles during his lifetime.

== Awards ==
- Three Orders of Lenin (1944, 1953, 1959)
- Order of the Red Banner of Labour (1945)
- Medal "For Valiant Labour in the Great Patriotic War 1941–1945" (1945)
- Lenin Prize (1963)

== Works ==
- Selected Political and Economic Writings: From the Hungarian Revolution to Orthodox Economic Theory in the USSR. [2020] André Mommen, ed. and trans. Chicago, IL: Haymarket Books, 2021.

== Notes ==
Political offices
Preceded by Pál Szende	People's Commissar of Finance; 1919	Succeeded by Béla Székely and Gyula Lengyel
