= Gyula Peidl =

Hungarian Prime Minister and trade union leader

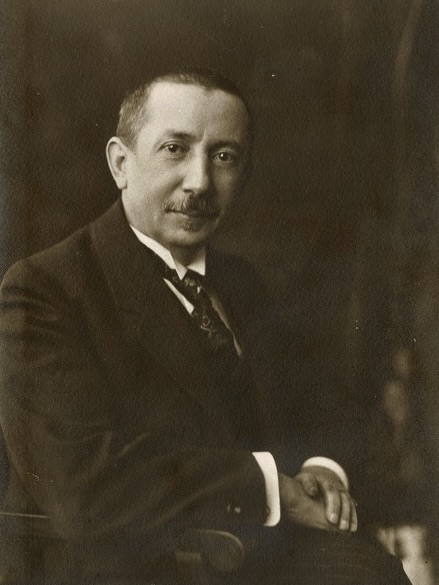
- Peidl in 1919

Acting Head of State of Hungary
- In office 1 August 1919 – 6 August 1919
- Prime Minister: Himself
- Preceded by: Sándor Garbai (as Chairman of the Central Executive Council)
- Succeeded by: Archduke Joseph (as Regent of Hungary)

Prime Minister of Hungary
- In office 1 August 1919 – 6 August 1919
- Head of State: Himself (acting)
- Preceded by: Sándor Garbai
- Succeeded by: István Friedrich

Personal details
- Born: 4 April 1873 Ravazd, Austria-Hungary
- Died: 22 January 1943 (aged 69) Budapest, Hungary
- Party: MSZDP
- Profession: politician

Gyula Peidl (4 April 1873 – 22 January 1943) was a Hungarian trade union leader and social democrat politician who served as prime minister and acting head of state of Hungary for 6 days in August 1919. His tenure coincided with a period of political instability in Hungary immediately after World War I, during which several successive governments ruled the country.

== Biography ==
=== Early life and career ===
Gyula Peidl was born on 4 April 1873 in Ravazd, Győr County. His father, a butcher, died early, thus Peidl was raised by his mother. During his apprentice years from 1886 to 1890, he became a typesetter at the printing facility of the Franklin Company. Following this he participated in study tours to Austria, Switzerland and Germany, where came in contact with Social Democratic movements and also learnt German. Returning home, he headed the printer's union from 1900 to 1908, and from 1909 onwards. He was one of the founding members of the General Consumer Cooperative (ÁFOSZ) in 1904. He was elected secretary of the organisation in 1908. As a journalist, he edited the weekly newspapers Typographia and Szövetkezeti Értesítő. He also served as a Board Member of the National Workers' Insurance Fund (Hungarian: Országos Munkásbiztosító Pénztár).

In 1909 he joined the leadership of the Social Democratic Party of Hungary (MSZDP). During the Mihály Károlyi era following World War I and proclamation of the First Hungarian People's Republic, he was Minister of Labour and Welfare in the government of Dénes Berinkey. In opposition to the union of the party with the Party of Communists in Hungary (KMP) at the beginning of the Hungarian Soviet Republic, he resigned his position in the leadership but maintained his membership in the new unified party, called the Socialist Party of Hungary (MSZP).

In July 1919, Romanian troops crossed the Tisza river and marched towards Budapest. On 1 August 1919, the Hungarian Soviet Republic ended and a government formed by Social Democrats and controlled by union leaders replaced it; the leader of the former government, Béla Kun, left the country the next day. The new government unanimously accepted the transfer of power after the Romanian invasion of the capital and, subsequently, the end of the Hungarian Soviet Republic. Sándor Garbai, the Chairman of the Central Executive Council summoned Peidl and communicated his request to form a government, as well as a list of ministers, which Peidl reluctantly accepted because of his closeness to the former cabinet.

The government's position was weak, subject to various pressures: opponents in the capital, Horthy's counter-revolutionary National Army, desertion by some smaller military units, or defectors who left the Socialists after having supported the Hungarian Soviet Republic.

=== His government ===
The cabinet, which contained four of Kun's former government commissioners (including Garbai himself), quickly transformed into Social Democrats, who retained important ministerial portfolios (including Defence and Foreign Affairs). At its first meeting on 2 August 1919, it officially dissolved the Hungarian Soviet Republic and declared again the Hungarian People's Republic; the people's courts were disbanded and former political prisoners were released from prisons. The release of the opponents reinforced the counter-revolutionaries. The country worked without a head of the state nor head of government.

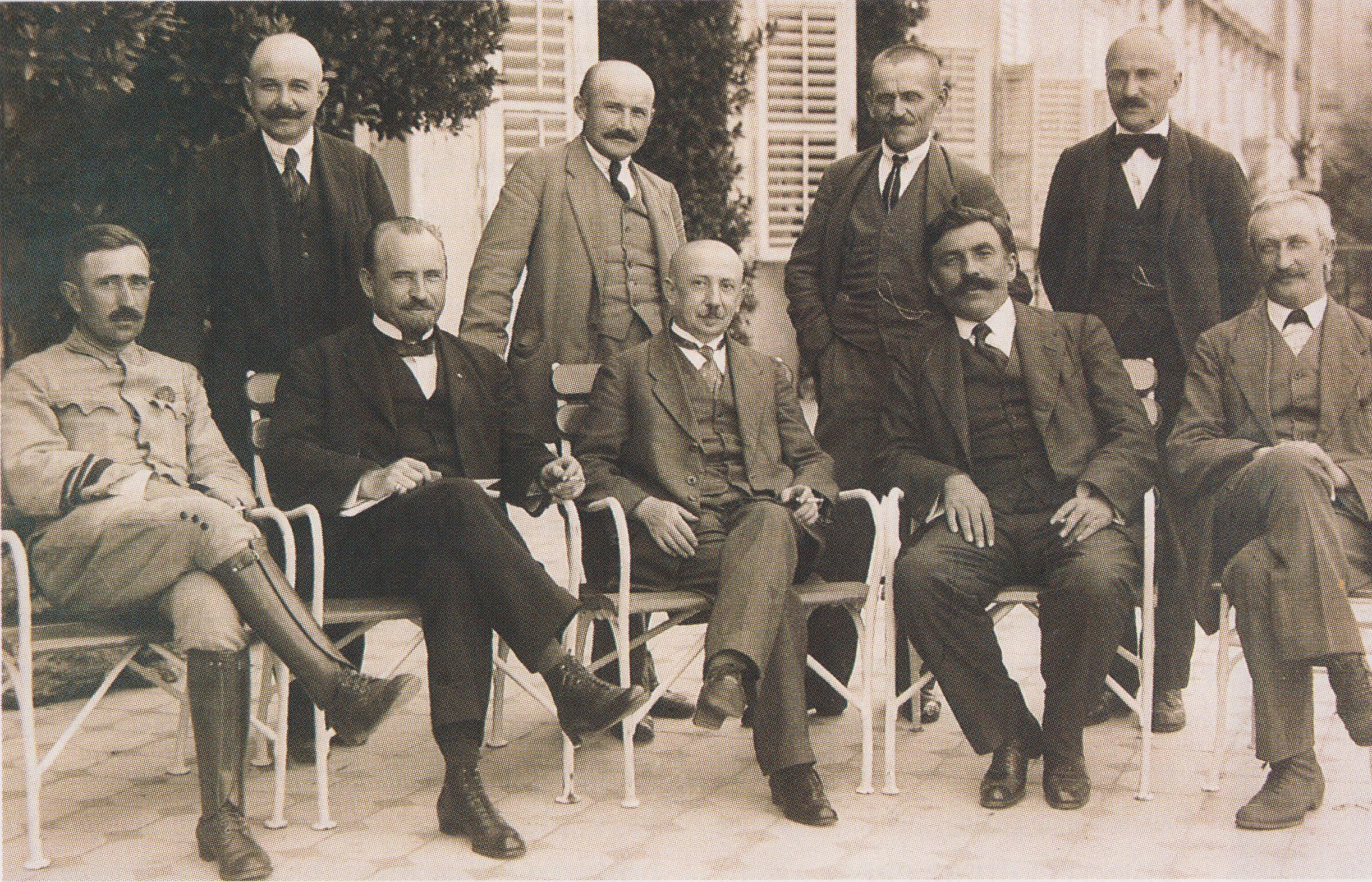
The short-lived Peidl Cabinet in August 1919

Former private owners were given nationalised former properties. Landowners were not transferred nationalised estates, however, as a gesture to the peasantry.

On the same day, the National Smallholders and Agrarian Workers Party (OKGFP) was invited into the government, and the Allied representative promised an end to the economic blockade. Peidl's government tried to demonstrate to the Allies its break with the previous government and its willingness to pursue a policy of moderation. The Allies, however, refused to recognise the new government for having only socialist members. The Romanian occupation army was not willing either to support the new government or to protect it from the counterrevolutionary forces.

Meanwhile, on the same day, the army recovered Szolnok on the outskirts of Budapest and ejected the Romanians. The Allies ordered their representative to begin negotiations with Peidl if he accepted, as he did, the Belgrade armistice; At the same time Peidl requested an army of occupation, partly to counter the Romanians and Czechs and partly to reinforce the power of his government.

On 4 August 1919, the Hungarian Red Guard was dissolved and the Hungarian police force was established. The capture of communist leaders was secretly ordered. The new government, however, had no real control over any armed force, and the battalions of the workers had been dissolved.

The measures taken quickly by the new government tried to win the sympathies of the bourgeoisie and the peasantry, while the cabinet began on 5 August 1919 a round of talks with the liberal parties. On the same day, and at the request of the Allied representative, the Red Guard, now particularly and disorganised and weak, and the other volunteer units were fully dissolved. Also on that day, Peidl's government ordered the withdrawal of the printed currency of the Hungarian Soviet Republic and the currency of the monarchy was reinstituted into legal circulation.

==== Overthrow ====
At the same time, the counterrevolutionary forces conspired to overthrow the government and put the Hungarian prince (and Austrian archduke) Joseph August in power. On the night of the 4 August 1919, the prince was brought from his castle to Budapest with the idea of seizing power the next day. Peidl received a communication from Vienna announcing that the Allies would support the government if it included bourgeois elements, which encouraged the counterrevolutionaries to accelerate their plans, backed by Traian Moșoiu, the Romanian military governor of Budapest, but rejected by the Allied representative.

The Romanians seized the capital on the request of refugee counterrevolutionaries in Vienna, against Allied warnings. In the rest of the country, the collapse of the communist administration and the power vacuum left behind led to chaos. The situation was not much better in the occupied capital, where looting and retaliation took place.

On 6 August 1919, the police and part of the army were already in the hands of the counterrevolutionary conspirators. That afternoon they arrested Károly Peyer, the Minister of the Interior, and learned that the government was meeting in the Sándor Palace. General Ferenc Schnetzer occupied, with Romanian support, the Ministry of Defense, without resistance. At the same time, a representative of the Allies appeared before the cabinet, backed by forty mounted policemen and some officers. He demanded, with threats of arrest, the resignation of the government. Peidl protested feebly and asked the assailants to withdraw. After receiving promises of personal security and the formation, in a few months, of a coalition government, the government decided to cede to the ultimatum. A Romanian contingent in the vicinity of the palace did not intervene.

On 7 August 1919, the King of Romania, Ferdinand I, entered the capital. On the same day, Prince Joseph August became regent and István Friedrich, an industrialist, built a new government with career officials from the various ministries and part of the conspirators, generally bourgeois plebeians.

The coup frustrated the possibilities of collaboration between socialists and liberals, and took away from the government some prominent political figures opposed to the seizure of power by force.

=== After the government ===
After the coup, Peidl became chair of the printer's trade union again. Representing the working class, he participated in the grand coalition talks intermediated by Allied representative George Clerk in early November. Peidl went into exile in Austria on 18 November 1919, after receiving an increasing number of death threats from far-right paramilitary groups. He resided in Vienna and Sankt Radegund bei Graz, where he worked as a proofreader, until his return to Hungary in November 1921, where he resumed his trade union activity. He became President of the General Consumer Cooperative. He actively participated in the restructuring process of the Social Democratic Party as a prominent member of the moderate and anti-communist wing.

Peidl was elected Member of Parliament for Szeged (2nd constituency) in the 1922 parliamentary election. From 1922 to 1931 he led the Hungarian Social Democratic Party parliamentary group in the unicameral National Assembly then the House of Representatives. When the conservative cabinet of István Bethlen applied for a loan from the League of Nations in 1924, Peidl was a member of a Social Democratic delegation to London which urged the British government not to fulfill the request until the re-adoption of universal suffrage, the abolition of the numerus clausus and the extension of assembly act. Peidl retired from politics just before the 1931 parliamentary election. He died in Budapest on 22 January 1943.

== See also ==
- Revolutions and interventions in Hungary (1918–20)

Political offices
Preceded by Zsigmond Kunfi	Minister of Labour and Welfare; January–March 1919	Succeeded by Dezső Bokányi
Preceded by Sándor Garbai	Acting Head of State of Hungary; 1–6 August 1919	Succeeded by Prince Joseph August
Preceded by Sándor Garbai	Prime Minister of Hungary; 1–6 August 1919	Succeeded by István Friedrich
Preceded by Ferenc Miákits	Minister of Finance; 2–6 August 1919	Succeeded by János Grünn
National Assembly of Hungary
Preceded by First	Leader of the MSZDP parliamentary group 1922–1931	Succeeded by Károly Peyer
