= Tibor Szamuely =

Hungarian politician (1890–1919)

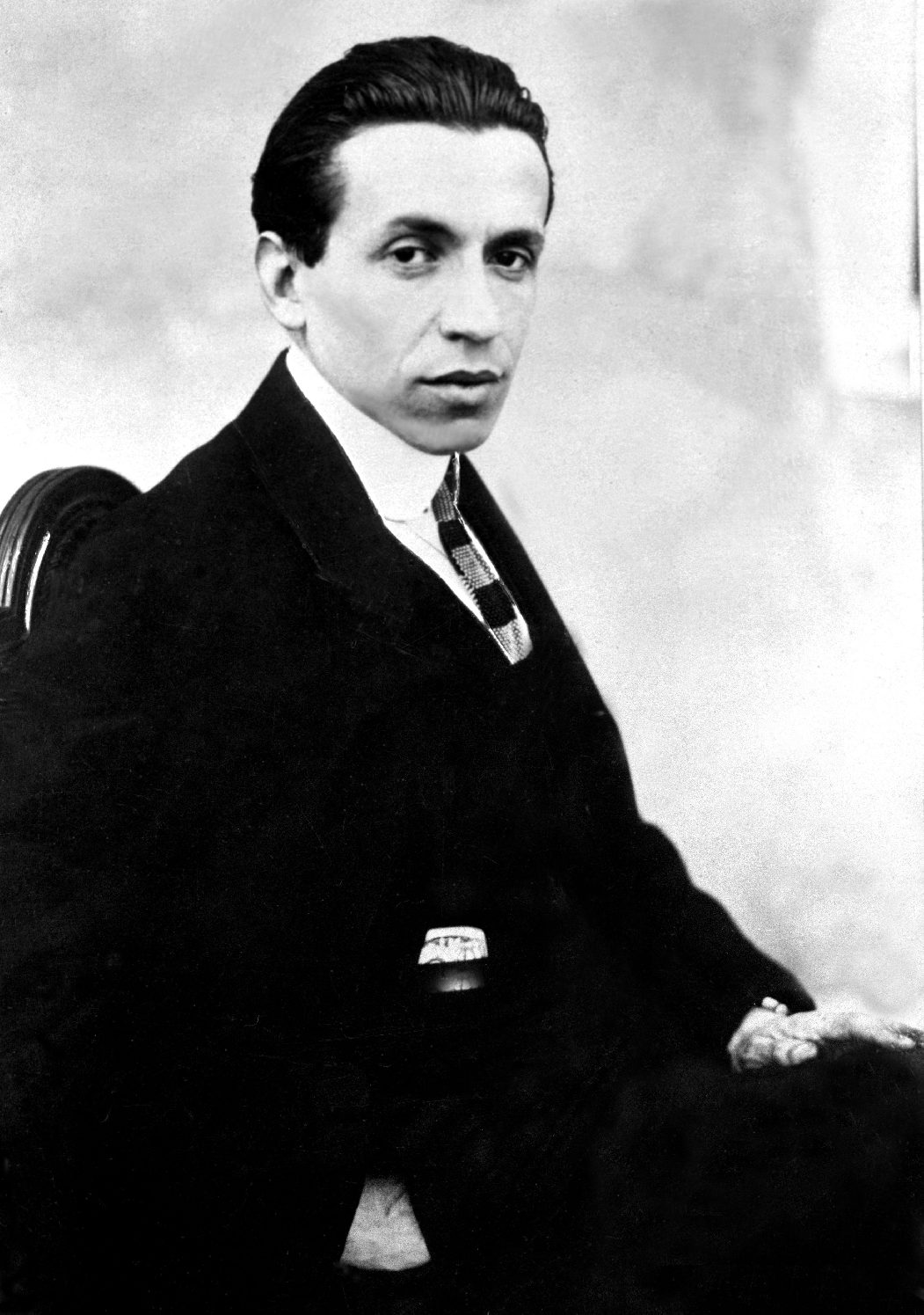

Personal details
- Born: December 27, 1890 Nyíregyháza, Austria-Hungary
- Died: August 2, 1919 (aged 28) Wiener Neustadt, Austria
- Party: KMP
- Spouse: Jolán Szilágyi
- Parent(s): Lajos Szamueli; Cecília Farkas

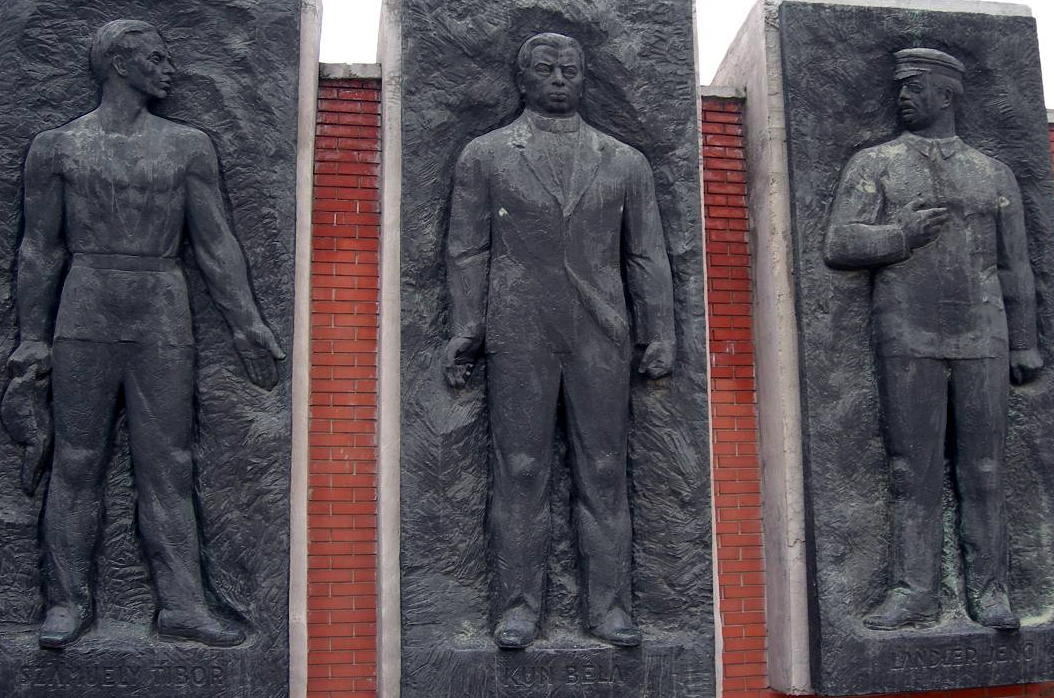
Tibor Szamuely, Béla Kun, Jenő Landler. Monument in Budapest.

Tibor Szamuely (December 27, 1890 – August 2, 1919) was a Hungarian communist politician and journalist who was Deputy People's Commissar of War and People's Commissar of Public Education during the Hungarian Soviet Republic.

== Early life ==
Born in Nyíregyháza, in northeastern Hungary, Szamuely was the oldest son of five children of a Jewish family. After completing his university studies he became a journalist, and started his political activities as a member of the Hungarian Social Democratic Party.

== Political career ==
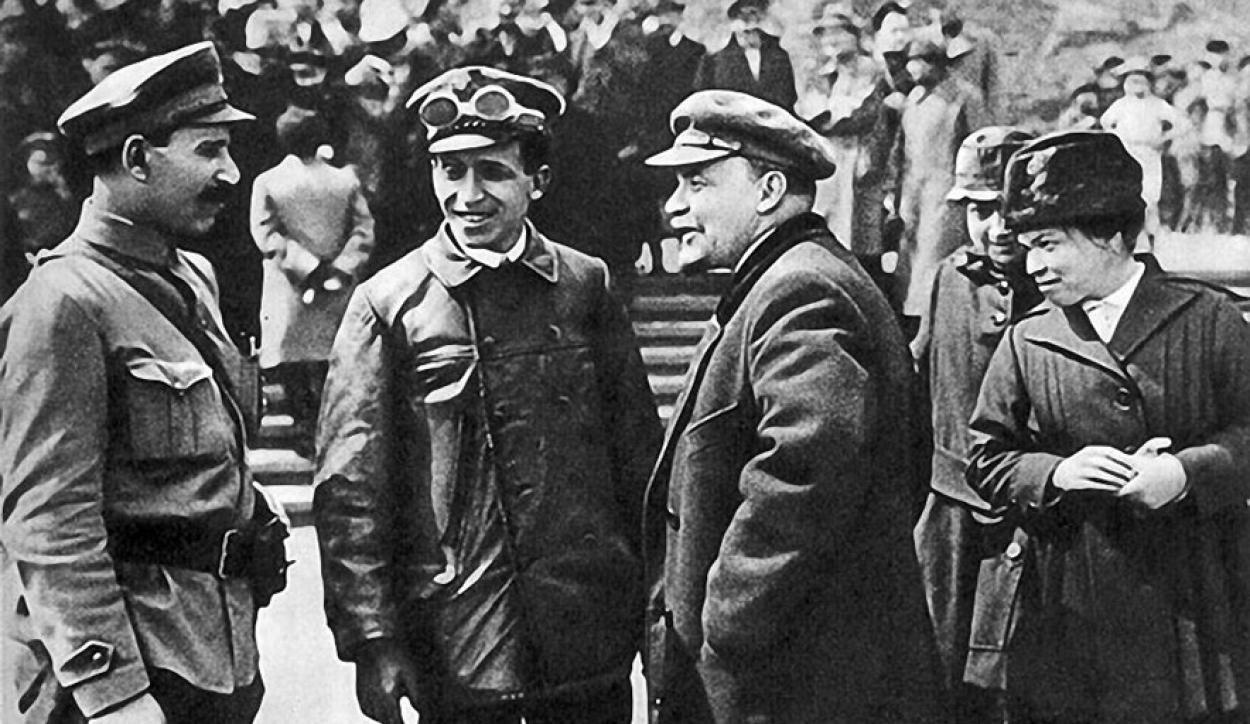
Tibor Szamuely, the leader of Lenin Boys meets with Vladimir Lenin in Moscow in 1919.

Szamuely was drafted and fought as a soldier during World War I; in 1915, he was captured by Russia. After the Russian October Revolution in 1917, he was released. By then, Szamuely had become interested in communism. In Moscow, he organised a communist group together with Béla Kun among the Hungarian prisoners of war. Many of them, including Szamuely and Kun, joined the Soviet Red Army and fought in the Russian Civil War.

In January 1918, he resided in Moscow, where he worked with Kun to organize Hungarian prisoners of war who supported the Russian Revolution. He was also a member of the Central Committee, responsible for the management of war prisoners. On March 24, he was appointed political deputy of the Communist group of Hungarian war prisoners. Between April 14 and 18, during the sessions, he participated in the meeting of the deputies. From April 3, 1918, he published a communist newspaper, Socialist Revolution, with Béla Kun. Many Hungarian war prisoners refused to join the Russian Red Guard, despite his efforts. Several Hungarian officers were executed in Russia as a result.

Szamuely later went to Germany and in December 1918, he participated in the formation of the Spartacist League, with Karl Liebknecht and Rosa Luxemburg. He returned to Budapest on January 3, 1919. He became a member of the Central Committee of the Hungarian Communist Party and joined the editing of the Red Paper. On February 20, he went into exile but continued his activities in the exiled Central Committee, such as participation in the organisation in the party's paramilitary.

Szamuely was an extremist in his views and his methods. In February 1919, as the communists in Budapest became prepared to rebel against the Social Democrat-Communist coalition government, he wrote in the pages of the Vörös Újság (Red News): "Everywhere counter-revolutionaries run about and swagger; beat them down! Beat their heads where you find them! If counter-revolutionaries were to gain the upper hand for even a single hour, there will be no mercy for any proletarian. Before they stifle the revolution, suffocate them in their own blood!"

On March 21, 1919, a coup by the communist members of the coalition government established the Hungarian Soviet Republic, under the leadership of Béla Kun. Szamuely became a prominent politician of the new government. He occupied a number of posts, but he then was made People's Commissar for Military Affairs. He became a figure of the so-called "Red Terror" of Hungary. Szamuely's guards became nicknamed the "Lenin Boys" or "Lenin Youth". They were an element in the heightened political tension and suppression of counterrevolutionaries and anti-communists. The Lenin Boys' activities were sometimes aligned with another paramilitary, the Red Guard, led by József Cserny, in which, on an armoured train they travelled the country.

The revolutionary tribunals executed between 370 and 590 of those in custody,

In late May 1919, Szamuely travelled to Moscow by aeroplane to campaign for world revolution with Vladimir Lenin. As Szamuely progressed with the revolutionary tribunals, Kun became increasingly uneasy of him, and feared that he was gaining more power than the government. The Social Democrats, who were also members of the Revolutionary Governing Council, pushed for keeping Szamuely and Cserny in check. Therefore, the People's Commissar of Military Affairs at that time, Vilmos Böhm, ordered the dissolution of the paramilitaries and the tribunals at the end of April 1919. Szamuely did not obey, but continued the tribunals' activities in Szolnok in May, then in Abony. He planned to assassinate Böhm, but by August 1919, the Hungarian Soviet Republic had ended after the Hungarian–Romanian War, and Szamuely was forced into exile.

== Later life ==
The Hungarian Soviet Republic lasted for six months. On August 1, 1919, Kun went into exile as Romanian troops invaded Budapest. Szamuely managed to escape the anticommunist reprisals, known as the "White Terror". He left for Austria in his car on August 2, 1919, but after making an illegal border crossing, he was arrested by the Austrian authorities. Both Hungarian and Austrian authorities reported that Szamuely had shot himself while the Communist partisan who smuggled him across the border was searched. The wife of Béla Kun wrote in her memoires that Szamuely had told her of his plan to commit suicide if he was captured, and had shown her a gun hidden in his clothes. That version of events is not universally accepted, however, and some believe that he had been shot by the border guards.

The Soviet barge carrier Tibor Szamueli was named after him.

== Bibliography ==
- Tibor Szamuely Alarm! - ausgewählte Reden und Aufsätze (Berlin. 1959).
- András Simor: Így élt Szamuely Tibor, Móra Könyvkiadó. (Budapest, 1978)
