= Staviteľský robotník =

Staviteľský Robotník ("The Construction Worker") was a Slovak language biweekly newspaper published from Budapest by the Hungarian Construction Workers Union. It was the first Slovak-language trade union newspaper; the Hungarian Construction Workers Union created the paper due to its substantial Slovak membership. Its first issue was published on September 1, 1903, and subsequent publication was sporadic. At the time of its founding, the newspaper was published in 1,000 copies. It was a Slovak language version of the Hungarian language publication Épitömunkás.

Matej Šuňavec was behind the initiative to launch the publication, and was one of its editors. Ludwig Belényesi was the chief editor of the newspaper. Sándor Garbai was the publisher of the newspaper. Staviteľský robotník frequently praised the struggle of the Russian proletariat.

It was printed at the Világosság Printing House. Subscriptions were priced at 4.80 Austro-Hungarian krone. The publication of the newspaper ended in 1907.
