= Irén Gál =

Piano teacher, communist politician Béla Kun's wife

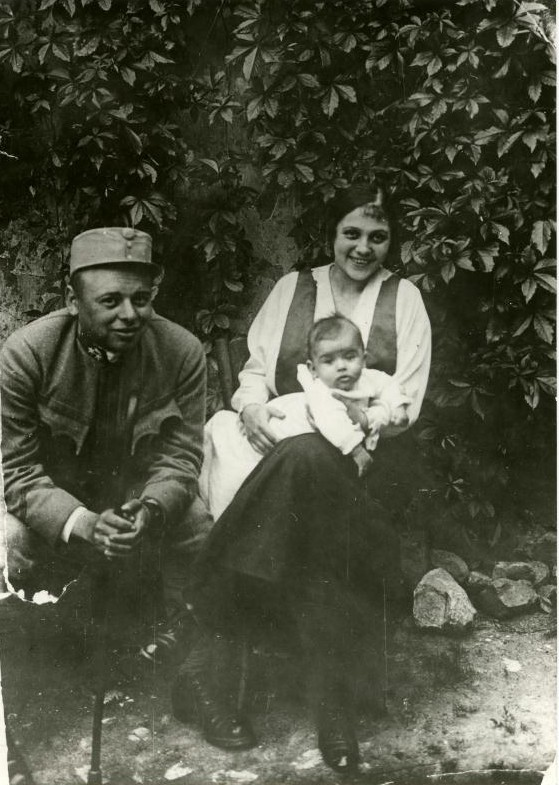
- Irén Gál with her husband and daughter in 1915

Commissar for Education and Culture
- In office April 1919 – 1 August 1919

Personal details
- Born: 14 December 1890 Nagyenyed, Kingdom of Hungary, Austria-Hungary (now Aiud, Romania)
- Died: 17 September 1974 (aged 83) Budapest, Hungarian People's Republic
- Spouse: Béla Kun
- Children: Miklós; Ágnes Kun
- Profession: Piano teacher, politician

Irén Gál, born Irén Grün (1890–1974), was a Hungarian piano teacher and communist party activist. She was the wife of Béla Kun.

== Biography ==
Gál was born in Nagyenyed into a poor, politically active Jewish family. She graduated from a high school in Cluj-Napoca and studied at the conservatory there, giving concerts and teaching private students. Gál met Béla Kun in 1910 or 1911 and married him in 1913, against her family's wishes. Their daughter Ágnes Kun was born two years later.

Under the Hungarian Soviet Republic, in which Kun occupied the preeminent position, Gál worked in the department for music and theatre affairs of the People's Commissariat for Education and Culture alongside Béla Reinitz. After the fall of the Soviet Republic, the family left Hungary, moving first to Austria, then Italy, and finally the Soviet Union. There she worked at International Red Aid and the Marx–Engels–Lenin Institute. During the Great Purge she was deported to Central Asia, while her husband was executed. She returned to Hungary in 1959 and published a memoir a decade later.
