= Pál Szende =

Hungarian politician

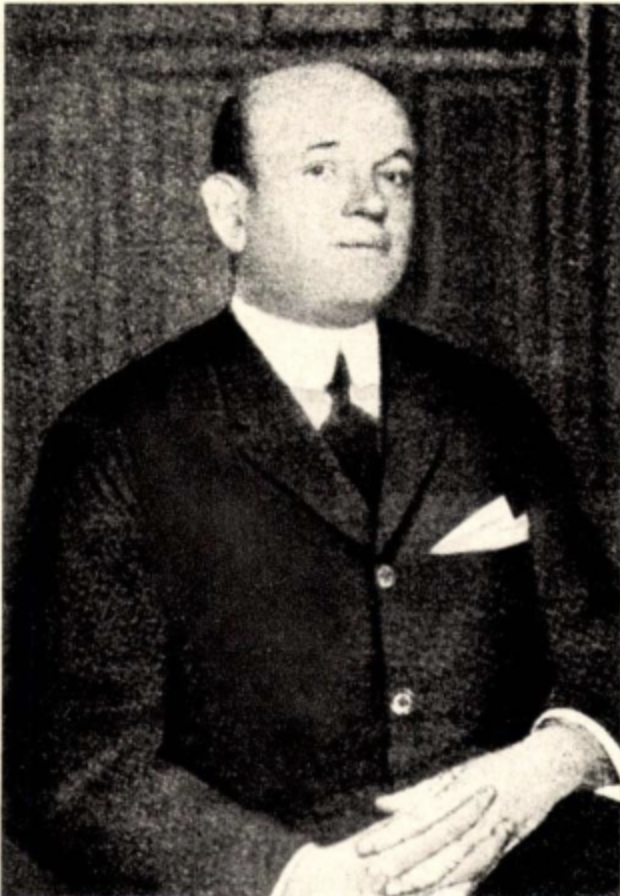

Minister of Finance of Hungary
- In office 25 November 1918 – 21 March 1919
- Preceded by: Mihály Károlyi
- Succeeded by: Jenő Varga

Personal details
- Born: 7 February 1879; Nyírbátor, Austria-Hungary
- Died: 15 July 1934 (aged 55); Seini, Kingdom of Romania
- Political party: Civil Radical Party
- Profession: politician, economist

Pál Szende (born as Pál Schwarz, 7 February 1879 – 15 July 1934) was a Hungarian politician, who served as Minister of Finance between 1918 and 1919. From 1904 he worked as a lawyer. He participated in the radical political movement along with Oszkár Jászi. After the establishment of the Hungarian Soviet Republic he lived in Vienna. Szende took part in the Austrian Civil War after that he escaped to Czechoslovakia then Romania, where he died. Pál Szende is buried in the city of Seini, Romania.

== Works ==
- Magyar háborus adópolitika [Hungarian war by tax policy], 1917
- Krise der mitteleuropaischen Revolution [The crisis of the Central European revolution], 1921
- 'Soziologische Gedanken zur Relativitätstheorie' [Sociological thought to relativity theory], Die neue Rundschau, Vol. 32, Frankfurt a. Main 1921, p. 1086
- Verhüllung und Enthüllung: der Kampf der Ideologien in der Geschichte [Concealment and revelation: the struggle of ideologies in history], Leipzig, 1922. Partial French translation in Gabel et al., L'aliénation aujourd'hui, Paris, 1974, pp. 319–49.
- 'Wissenschaft und Autorität', Der Kampf, Vol. 15, No. 9/10 (1922), p. 302
- 'Das System der Wissenschaften und die Gesellschaftsordnung', Kölner Vierteljahreshefte für Sozialwissenschaften, Vol. 2, No. 4 (1922), p. 7
- 'Eine soziologische Theorie der Abstraktion' [A sociological theory of abstraction], Archiv für Sozialwissenschaft und Sozialpolitik, April 1923
- Der Faschismus in Europa, Der Kampf, 22:4 (1929), p. 200
- 'Bergson: der Metaphysiker der Gegenrevolution' [Bergson: the metaphysician of the counter- revolution], Die Gesellschaft, Vol. 2 (1930), pp. 552ff.
- 'Nationales Recht und Klassenrecht. – Beiträge aus der ungarischen Rechts- und Wirtschaftsgeschichte', Festschrift für Carl Grünberg. Zum 70. Geburtstag, Leipzig, 1932, pp. 445–478
- 'Das Zeitalter der Denkfaulheit' [The age of intellectual laziness], Der Kampf, Vol. 26, No. 11 (1933), pp. 453–55
- Demaskierung: Die Rolle der Ideologien in der Geschichte [Unmasking: the role of ideology in history], 1970.

Political offices
Preceded by Mihály Károlyi	Minister of Finance; 1918–1919	Succeeded by Jenő Varga
