= Sándor Imre =

Hungarian politician

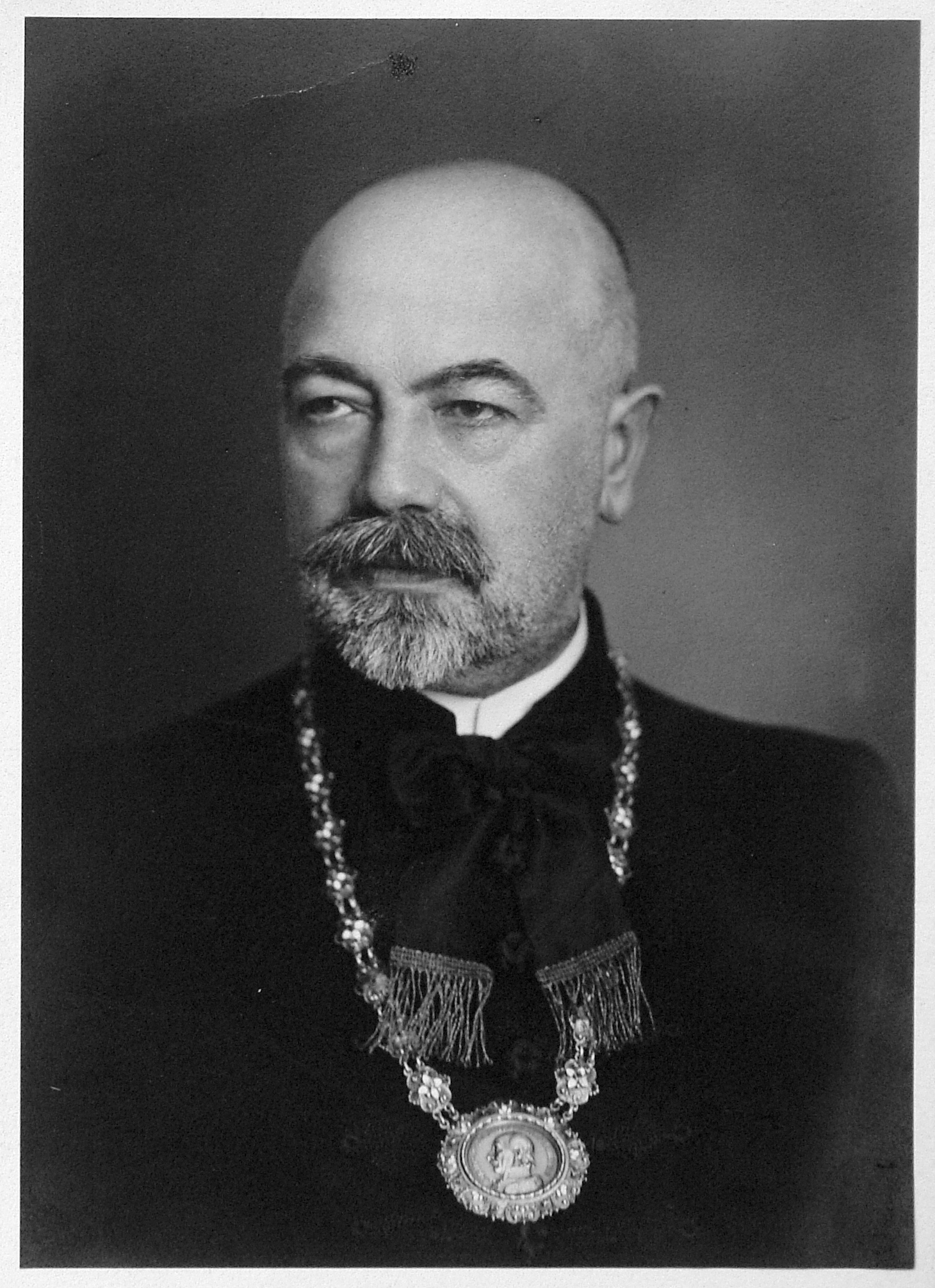

Minister of Religion and Education of Hungary
- In office 7 August 1919 – 15 August 1919
- Preceded by: Sándor Garbai
- Succeeded by: Károly Huszár

Personal details
- Born: 13 October 1877; Hódmezővásárhely, Kingdom of Hungary
- Died: 11 March 1945 (aged 67); Budapest, Kingdom of Hungary
- Political party: MSZDP
- Profession: politician, educator

Sándor Imre (13 October 1877 – 11 March 1945) was a Hungarian educator, who served as Minister of Religion and Education in 1919 for eight days. He proposed the education of the psychology on the universities, firstly in Hungary. His plans were fulfilled in 1929 at the University of Szeged. The Institute of Psychology on Szeged was created on 18 December 1929.

== Biography ==
He was born onto a Calvinist family on Hódmezővásárhely.

Political offices
Preceded by Sándor Garbai	Minister of Religion and Education; 1919	Succeeded by Károly Huszár
