= Béla Székely =

Hungarian politician

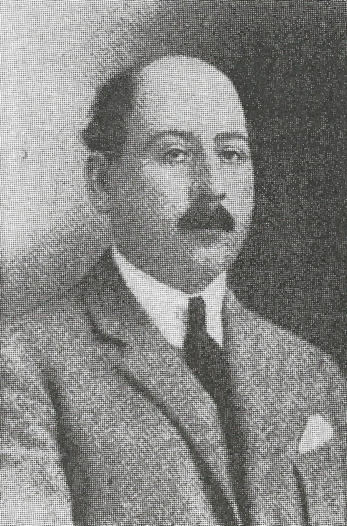

Minister of Finance of Hungary
- In office 3 April 1919 – 1 August 1919
- Preceded by: Jenő Varga
- Succeeded by: Ferenc Miákits

Personal details
- Born: Béla Weisz; 17 July 1889; Budapest, Austria-Hungary
- Died: 10 January 1939 (aged 49); Soviet Union
- Political party: MSZDP, Hungarian Communist Party
- Profession: politician, economist

Béla Székely (Born as Béla Weisz 17 July 1889 – 10 January 1939) was a Hungarian politician, who served as Minister of Finance in 1919 (until 24 June with Gyula Lengyel). After the fall of the Hungarian Soviet Republic he emigrated to Austria. From 1930, Székely worked in Berlin later lived in the Soviet Union. In 1938 he was arrested and executed during the Great Purge.

== Sources ==
- Magyar Életrajzi Lexikon

Political offices
Preceded by Jenő Varga	People's Commissar of Finance with Gyula Lengyel; 1919	Succeeded by himself alone
Preceded by himself with Gyula Lengyel	People's Commissar of Finance; 1919	Succeeded by Ferenc Miákits
