= Gyula Lengyel =

Hungarian politician

Minister of Finance of Hungary
- In office 3 April 1919 – 24 June 1919
- Preceded by: Jenő Varga
- Succeeded by: Béla Székely

Personal details
- Born: 8 October 1888 Szatmárnémeti, Austria-Hungary
- Died: 8 January 1938 (aged 49) Soviet Union
- Political party: MSZDP, Communist Party of Hungary
- Profession: politician, economist

Gyula Lengyel (born Gyula Goldstein; 8 October 1888 – 8 January 1938) was a Hungarian politician of Jewish descent who served as Minister of Finance in 1919 (with Béla Székely). For all of the Hungarian Soviet Republic's economic policy, he arranged the conceptual and practical forming of his financial policy inside this, and the organizing of the public supply. After the fall of the communist regime in Hungary in 1919, he emigrated to Austria. His many economic and political studies were revealed in these years. In 1922, Lengyel moved to Berlin and became a colleague of the Soviet representation of foreign trade, and leader of the economic-political department then.

From 1925, he collaborated in the development of the whole Soviet foreign trade as the member of a most considerable Soviet economic foreign representation's council in the then one. From 1930, he lived in the Soviet Union. He expounded a specialist and political-performing activity with a wide circle. Lengyel was arrested in 1937 by the Soviet authorities. Later, he was executed in 1938 and later was rehabilitated.

Political offices
Preceded by Jenő Varga	People's Commissar of Finance with Béla Székely; 1919	Succeeded by Béla Székely
