= Ravazd =

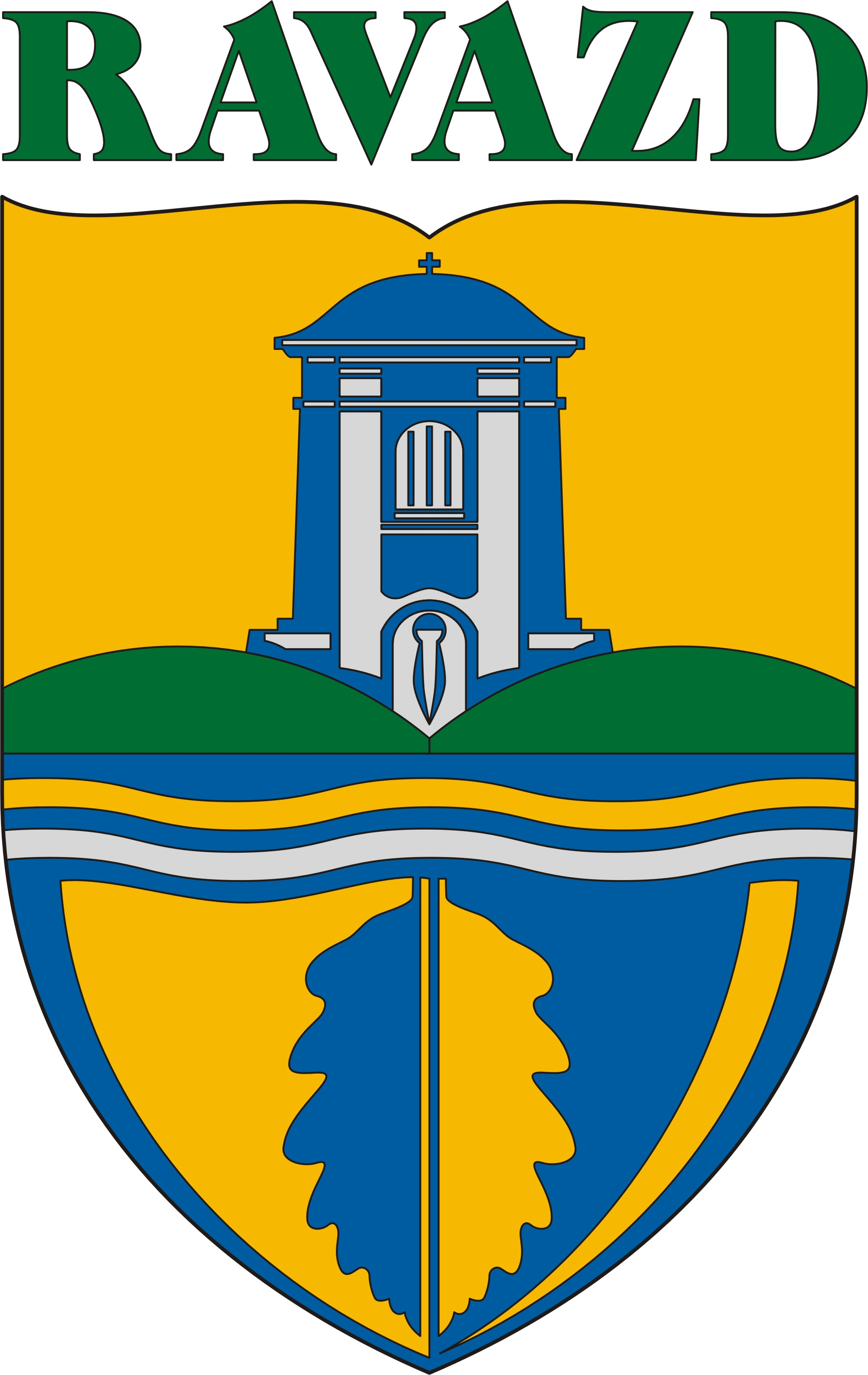
- Coat of arms

- Location of Győr-Moson-Sopron county in Hungary

- Location of Ravazd
- Coordinates: 47.51730°N 17.75119°E
- Country: Hungary
- County: Győr-Moson-Sopron

Area
  - Total: 28.54 km^{2} (11.02 sq mi)

Population (2004)
  - Total: 1,216
  - Density: 42.6/km^{2} (110/sq mi)
- Time zone: UTC+1 (CET)
  - Summer (DST): UTC+2 (CEST)
- Postal code: 9091
- Area code: 96

Ravazd is a village in Győr-Moson-Sopron county, Hungary.

King Ladislaus I donated it to the Benedictine Abbey of Pannonhalma. During the Ottoman invasion, the Cseszneky family also had noble estates in the village. The Turks destroyed the village, but in the 18th century, it was re-populated by Hungarian serfs.

Ravazd is famous for the fountain of King Béla IV.

== Famous residents ==
- Gyula Peidl (1873 – 1943), Hungarian trade union leader, politician, Prime Minister and head of state of Hungary
