= Lenin Boys =

Paramilitary of the Hungarian Soviet Republic

- Lenin-fiúk (Hungarian)

Agency overview
- Type: Paramilitary
- Jurisdiction: Hungarian Soviet Republic
- Headquarters: Batthyány Palace, Budapest
- Employees: 200
- Agency executive: Tibor Szamuely
- Parent agency: Party of Communists in Hungary

Béla Kun visits the Lenin Boys on 1 May 1919, Budapest (1080p HD)

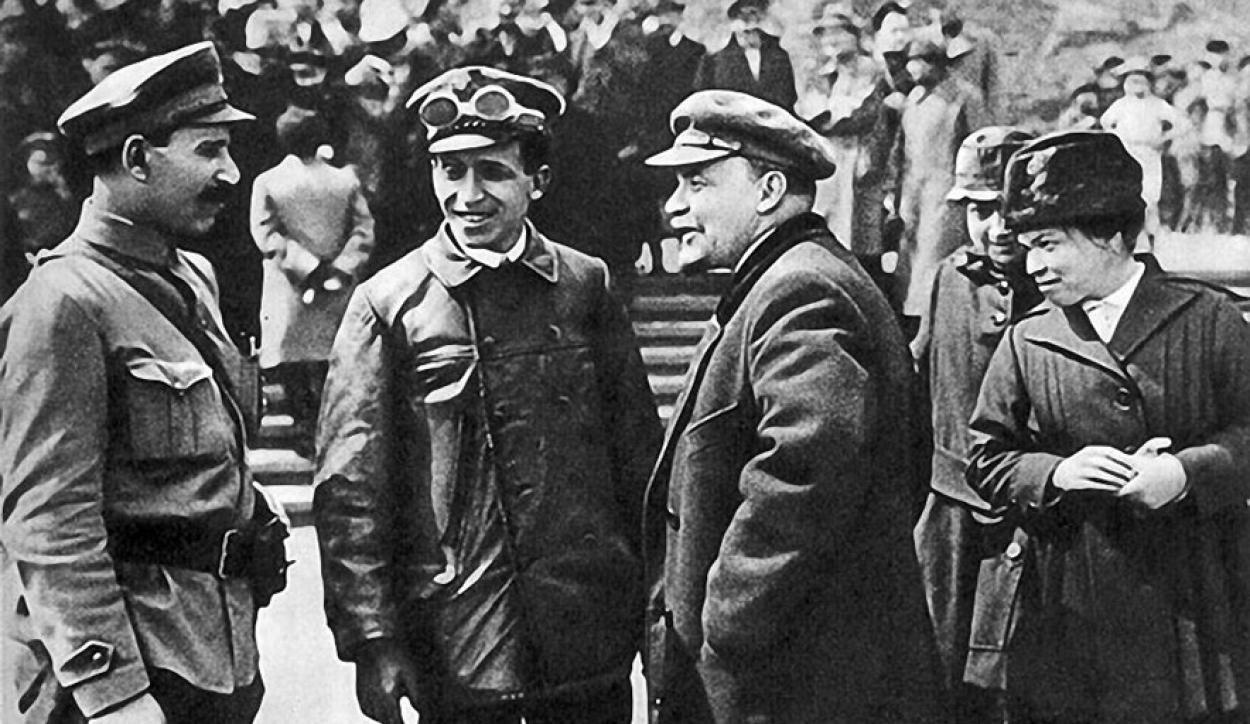
Tibor Szamuely, the leader of the Lenin Boys, meets with Vladimir Lenin in Moscow

The Lenin Boys (Hungarian: Lenin-fiúk) were the paramilitary of the Hungarian Communist Party operating in the Hungarian Soviet Republic in 1919. The group consisted of around 200 men and was commanded by Tibor Szamuely. An additional armed militia, often also identified as Lenin Boys or conflated with the main group (but acting more independently from the Soviet government), was led by József Cserny. The Lenin Boys were used as an instrument to suppress counter-revolutionary urges against the revolutionary government.

== History ==
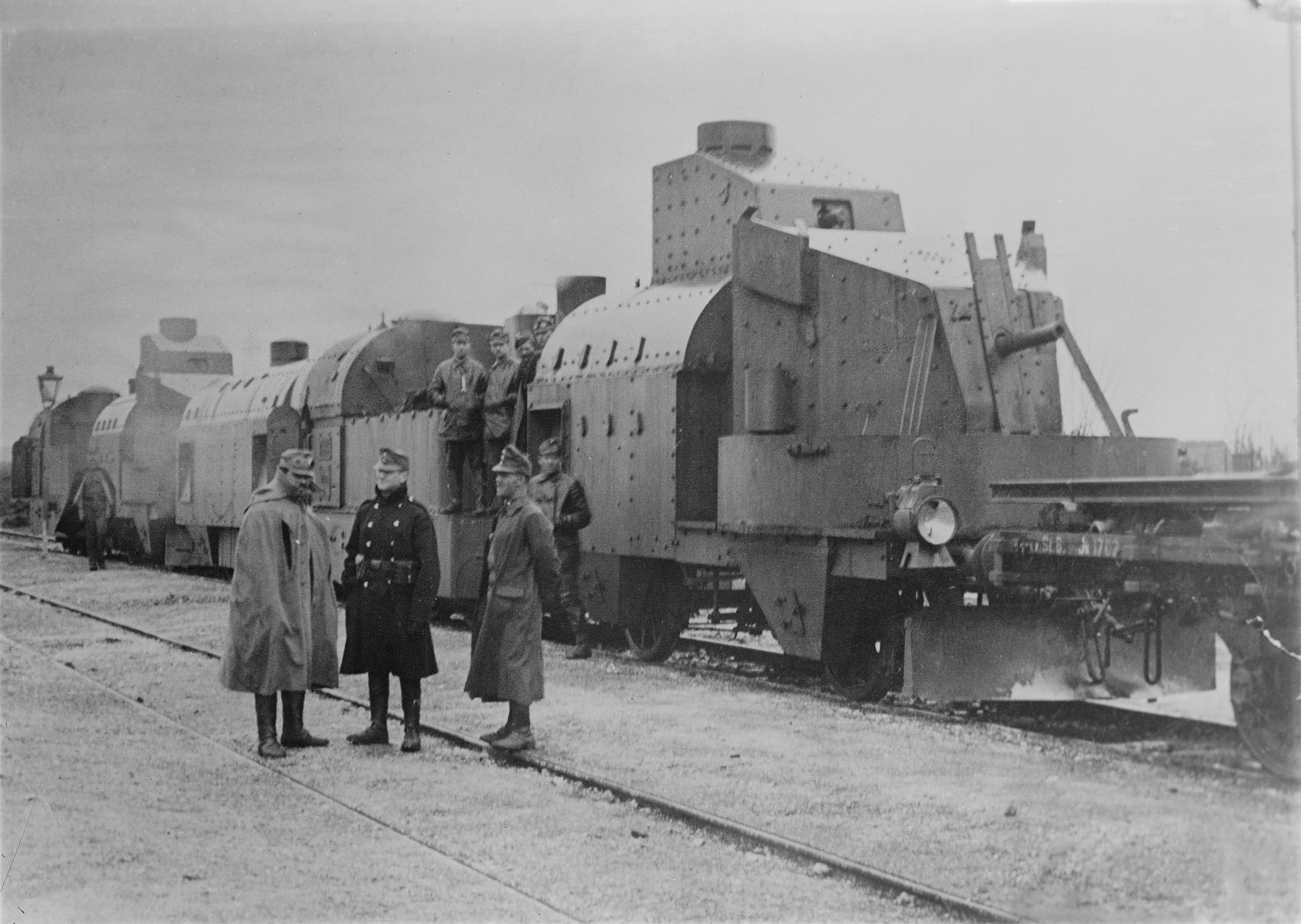
A MÁV armoured train in 1914, which was used during the Red Terror in 1919

After a failed counter-revolutionary coup attempt in June 1919, communist leader Béla Kun is said to have used the Lenin Youth to stamp out counter-revolutionary urges among monarchists and other reactionaries. Tallies of the number of victims of the terror vary; different sources generally count the dead at around 400 to 600. A book published by Albert Váry in 1922, titled "The Victims of Red Terror in Hungary" documents 590 suspects executed by communist paramilitaries.

The Counter-revolutionaries are running and propagandizing against us everywhere, beat them! Beat them to death where you find them! If the counter-revolution succeeds even for an hour, they won't spare a single proletarian. Before they can drown our revolution in blood, you must drown them in their own blood!

— Tibor Szamuely (People's Commissar), Vörös Újság (Red News), 11 February 1919.

The crew of Tibor Szamuely's death train was made up partly of them, partly of groups from the Mozdony Street Teachers' College and the Trefort Street High School. Its composition varied, but there were 34 permanent members who were identified. These are, in alphabetical order: Babulka Engelbert, László Berényi, Mór Braun, István Dékány, Antal Gábor, József Gáspár, Géza Gerlei, Mihály Hefter, Béla Huber, Gyula Jónás, Árpád Kerekes (Maxim Jablonszki, József Kámán, Gyula Knechtl) Lajos, János Köves, József Krajcsovics, Antal Leviritz, Béla London, Mór Lőbl, Béla Lőwinger, László Lukács, József Major, József Mann, Miksa Max, József Oswald, István Pálinkás, Géza Pap, Gábor Stön, László Szamuely, Vladimir Urasov. In the cases where Szamuely launched mass reprisals (e.g. István Bartalos, Tibor Bonyháti, Gábor Csomor, Péter Csoba, Imre Dögei, Géza Groó, Lipót Holtzmann, József Kakas, József Kuszkó, Márton Löscher, Ferenc Miákovics, Károly Pergovátz, Mihály Pervanger, Mihály Pintér ?, Simits ?, Aladár Steier, János Steiger, Vilmos Verszk. Prosecutors found that the Lenin boys on the "special train" were accomplices in 92 proven murders.

"Now the power is in our hands. Anyone who wants the return of the old capitalist rule must be hanged mercilessly. The throat of such a man must be bitten out. The victory of the proletariat in Hungary so far has not cost much in human sacrifice. But now it will be necessary to shed blood. Don't be afraid of the blood-shed! Blood is steel: it strengthens our heart, it strengthens the fist of the proletariat. It is blood what will lead us to the true glory. If it is necessary, we will destroy [physically] the whole bourgeoisie."

— From a speech given by Tibor Szamuely in Győr on 20 April 1919.

On 19 May 1919, the Cserny group was disarmed in Gödöllő. To this end, the army high command mobilised two battalions and an artillery unit. Their weapons were as follows: seven 140 millimetre mortars, six 90 millimetre mortars, three 75 millimetre anti-tank guns, seven infantry guns, seven machine guns, 64 crates of bombs, 130 crates of hand grenades, 41 crates of machine gun ammunition, 115 crates of ammunition for infantry guns, 807 crates of ammunition for mortars. They also had eight cars and six trucks.

The majority of the group was sent to the front. 25 men continued to guard the Soviet House, and 43 men were assigned to the Political Investigation Department under the command of Ottó Korvin and Cserny. This became the "second Cserny group".

They often collaborated with the Lenin boys, led by Szamuely, the people of the Frontal Opposition Committee. The infamous armoured train of Szamuely was often manned by terrorists belonging to the Cherny group, who thus took part in the suppression of all major real or imagined counter-revolutionary uprisings.

"On 5 June 1919, a counter-revolution broke out in Kőszeg in connection with the railway strike. But it was soon suppressed and the revenge was taken. About a hundred people were rounded up. They reported the matter to Tibor Szamuelly, who was in Szombathely, and who arrived in Kőszeg with Otto Korvin Klein and his terrorists on 6 June 1919, where Dr. Halász, on the basis of the report of József Hirschler and others, sentenced him to death and – with his terrorists – immediately executed Jenő Waisbecker and György Heresies without any formality, with a simple wave of the hand. The head of György Heresies was crushed by József Kámán's terrorist rifle shot. Waisbecker was not only shot to pieces, but stabbed through with a bayonet too. The other counter-revolutionaries were sentenced to heavy prison sentences and the city's population was fined a total of one million Krone."

— Albert Váry: The Victims of Red Rule in Hungary, Editio, Budapest, 1993, ISBN 963-8484-00-4

At the beginning of June, Ottó Korvin informed the Cabinet that he could no longer cooperate with the V. subdivision headed by Cserny. However, the counter-revolutionary uprising that broke out on 24 June changed the situation. Cserny's group played an important role in putting down the anti-Communist rebellion.

After the Hungarian–Romanian War, Romanian Army troops entered Hungary and took Budapest on 6 August 1919, Kun and other members of the government fled. After the arrival of Miklós Horthy's counter-revolutionary death squads in Budapest three months later, anti-communist officers carried out waves of retributive violence against communists and their supporters (as well as suspected leftists of any stripe) known as the White Terror, wherein as many as 1,000 people were killed. As many communist leaders were ethnically Jewish, this encouraged antisemitic lynchings in Budapest by paramilitary forces.

The army of the Soviet Republic was defeated on 1 August 1919. After the surrender, the Communist leadership was allowed to flee, leaving Otto Korvin and Lenin's boys in Hungary. Their trial began on 25 November 1919. Cserny was captured, tried, and executed by the new regime in December 1919, along with several other Lenin Boys.

== Execution ==
On 18 December 1919, the following 14 people were executed in the prison at 85 Margit Boulevard: József Cserny, Sándor Papp, Ferenc Kakas, Sándor Mészáros, Gábor Schön, Max Miksa, Tibor Bonyháti, Géza Groó, Mór Löbl, Gábor Steomor, János Steiger, Márton Löscher, Lajos Küvér, Géza Neumayer.

The Hungarian Curia (Supreme Court) rejected one by one of the fourteen terrorist pardon requests and allowed free access to justice. At the behest of the state prosecutor's office, the death sentences were carried out in the courtyard of the Margit Boulevard military prison on Thursday morning from 8 a.m. to noon. Three criminal judges appeared at the execution: dr. Gyula Keresztessy, dr. Károly Gebhard and dr. Béla Nagy, also dr. Ferenc Szücs clerk. The Public Prosecutor's Office was represented by Elemér Felföldy. On the afternoon of 17 December, Dr. Elemér Felföldy, the public prosecutor, announced the rejection decision of the court's pardon committee, and then placed all fourteen people on death in the prison, which had been converted into an execution house.

The death row inmates were visited by their relatives in the afternoon. They all brought plenty of food, drink, cigars and cigarettes. The prosecutor's office ruled that those sentenced to death could consume everything, but received only minimal alcohol.

== See also ==
- Red Terror (Hungary)

== Sources ==
- Borsanyi, Gyorgy. The Life of a Communist Revolutionary, Béla Kun, translated by Mario Fenyo, Boulder, Colorado: Social Science Monographs; New York: Distributed by Columbia University Press, 1993.
