= Guido Romanelli =

Guido Romanelli (Siena, 1876 – S. Vito al Tagliamento, 1973) was an Italian army officer.

At the end of the First World War, Colonel Guido Romanelli became chef of the Italian Military Mission to Hungary from May to November 1919. At this time he was the only official representative of the Entente in Budapest and he intervened forcefully against the reprisals of the revolutionary government of Béla Kun, intervening to save the lives of cadets of the military academy of Ludovika who rebelled against the Bolshevik regime.

His activities brought him the recognition and devotion of the Hungarian people. Following advance of the Romanian forces toward the Hungarian capital, Romanelli guaranteed and managed the escape from the country of some of the major leaders of the regime and their families, acting as mediator between the foreign occupying forces and the new Government after the occupation of Budapest. For his activities, in 1922 he was awarded with the Hungarian Decoration of the Sword of Honour. In subsequent years, Romanelli served as Consul of Italy in Spain and President of the Italian-Hungarian Commercial Bank.

== Bibliography ==
- Guido Romanelli, Nell'Ungheria di Béla Kun e durante l'occupazione romena. La mia missione. (maggio‐novembre 1919), Doretti editore, Udine 15 marzo 1964.
- Guido Romanelli, Nell’Ungheria di Béla Kun e durante l’occupazione romena. La mia missione (maggio-novembre 1919), a cura di Antonello Biagini, Ufficio Storico – Stato Maggiore dell’Esercito, Roma 2002.
- Viviana Stacco, "Guido Romanelli e l'Ungheria. Analisi di una missione 1919", Università degli Studi di Udine, anno accademico 2003–2004, tesi di laurea
- Viviana Stacco, "Romanelli e l'Ungheria. Analisi di una missione. 1919", in "Sot la nape", Udine, ed. Società filologica Friulana, n°1-2, gennaio-febbraio 2006.
- Viviana Stacco, "L'impossibile missione di Romanelli. Un ufficiale italiano nell'Ungheria della Rivoluzione", prefazione del prof. Giorgio Petracchi, Gaspari editore, Udine 2010.
