= Ferenc Miákits =

Hungarian politician

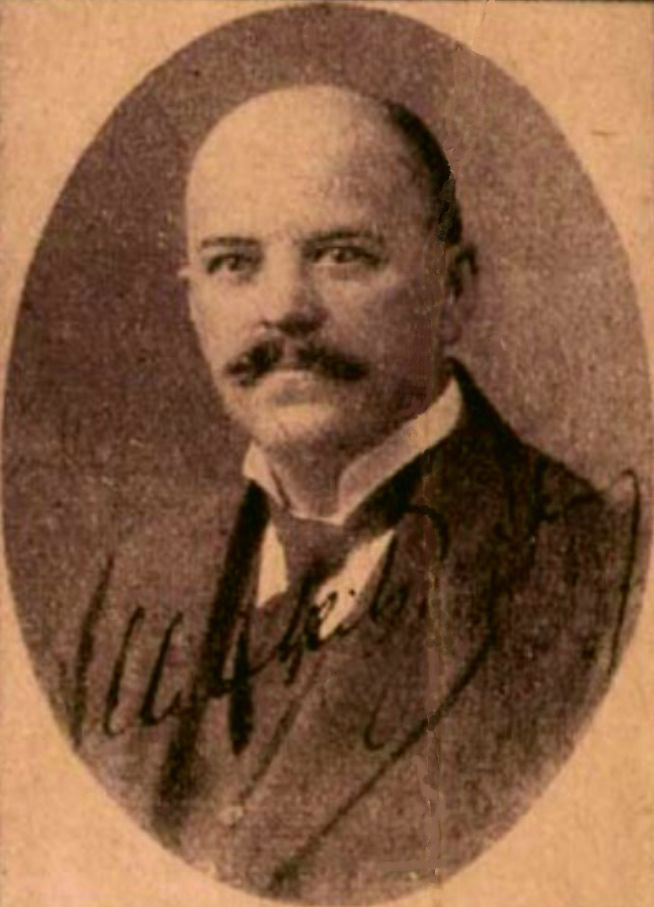

Minister of Finance of Hungary
- In office 1 August 1919 – 6 August 1919
- Preceded by: Béla Székely
- Succeeded by: Gyula Peidl

Personal details
- Born: 7 April 1876; Érd, Austria-Hungary
- Died: 17 May 1924 (aged 48); Budapest, Kingdom of Hungary
- Political party: MSZDP
- Profession: politician

Ferenc Miákits (7 April 1876 – 17 May 1924) was a Hungarian politician, who served as Minister of Finance in 1919. He was one of the leaders of the MSZDP. In the Károly Huszár administration he served as state secretary of the Ministry of Trade for a short time. In 1922 he became a member of the Diet of Hungary.

Political offices
Preceded by Béla Székely	Minister of Finance; 1919	Succeeded by Gyula Peidl
