= Sándor Hollán Jr. =

Hungarian politician

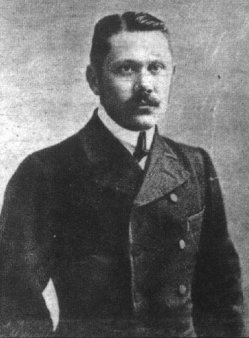
Sándor Hollán Jr.

Sándor József Hollán the Younger (6 October 1873 – 22 April 1919) was a Hungarian politician and state secretary.

Hollán was born in Tabán (part of Budapest) to Sándor Hollán Sr. and Róza Szalay. His godfather was József Szlávy who served as Prime Minister of Hungary between 1872 and 1874. Hollán married to Mária Kolossváry. He became director of the Hungarian State Railways in 1910 as a ministerial councillor.

During the Hungarian Soviet Republic he was one of the first victims of the Red Terror. He was kidnapped along with his father from their residence on 22 April 1919. On the Széchenyi Chain Bridge the communist perpetrators shot in the head from behind both of them and threw their bodies into the Danube.
