= Sándor Hollán Sr. =

Hungarian politician

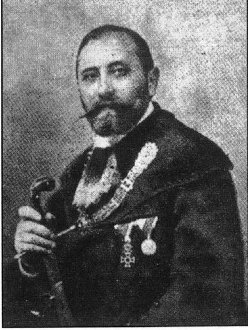
Sándor Hollán Sr.

Sándor József Hollán the Elder (15 March 1846 – 22 April 1919) was a Hungarian politician and state secretary.

Hollán was born in Kiscell (now: Celldömölk) to Adolf Hollán, a Hungarian physician and Jozefa Pingitzer. He had a brother, Viktor Hollán, also a politician and member of the Diet of Hungary. Sándor Hollán married to Róza Szalay on 12 August 1872. Their son, Sándor Hollán Jr. was born in the next year. He was appointed director of the Magyar Királyi Postatakarékpénztár. He became ministerial councillor in 1890. He retired in 1907 as a state secretary.

During the Hungarian Soviet Republic he was one of the first victims of the Red Terror. He was kidnapped along with his son from their residence on 22 April 1919. On the Széchenyi Chain Bridge the communist perpetrators shot in the head from behind both of them and threw their bodies into the Danube.
