= Béla Kun =

Hungarian communist revolutionary and politician (1886–1938)

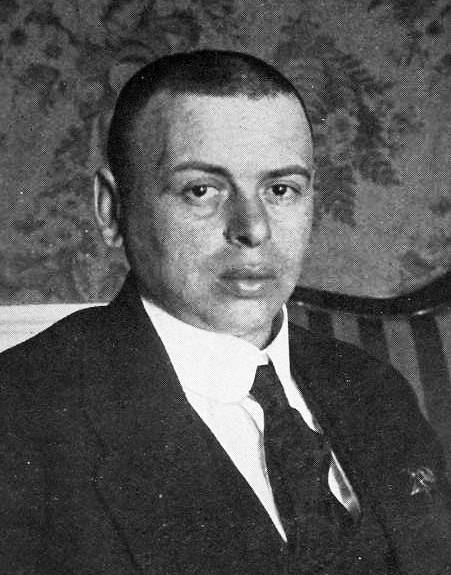
- Béla Kun in 1919

People's Commissar of Foreign Affairs
- De facto leader of the Hungarian Soviet Republic
- In office 12 March – 1 August 1919 Serving with József Pogány, Péter Ágoston
- Preceded by: Ferenc Harrer
- Succeeded by: Péter Ágoston

Personal details
- Born: Béla Kohn; 20 February 1886 Lele, Kingdom of Hungary, Austria-Hungary (now Hodod, Romania)
- Died: 29 August 1938 (aged 52) Kommunarka shooting ground, Moscow, Russian SFSR, Soviet Union
- Party: Hungarian Social Democratic Party (MSZDP); Communist Party of Hungary (KMP)
- Spouse: Irén Gál
- Children: Miklós; Ágnes Kun
- Parent(s): Samu Kohn; Róza Goldberger
- Education: Franz Joseph University
- Profession: Politician, journalist

Béla Kun (born Béla Kohn; 20 February 1886 – 29 August 1938) was a Hungarian communist revolutionary and politician who in 1919 governed the Hungarian Soviet Republic.

After attending Franz Joseph University at Kolozsvár (today Cluj-Napoca, Romania), Kun had worked as a journalist until World War I. He served in the Austro-Hungarian Army, was captured by the Imperial Russian Army in 1916, and was sent to a prisoner-of-war camp in the Ural Mountains. In Russia, Kun embraced communist ideas, and in 1918 in Moscow he co-founded a Hungarian arm of the Russian Communist Party. He befriended Vladimir Lenin and fought for the Bolsheviks in the Russian Civil War.

In November 1918 Kun returned to Hungary with Soviet support and set up the Party of Communists in Hungary. Adopting Lenin's tactics, he agitated against the government of Mihály Károlyi and achieved great popularity despite being imprisoned. After his release in March 1919, Kun led a successful coup d'état, formed a Communist-Social Democratic coalition government, and proclaimed a Hungarian Soviet Republic. Though the Republic's de jure leader was Prime Minister Sándor Garbai, de facto power was held by Foreign Minister Kun, who maintained direct contact with Lenin via radiotelegraph and received orders and advice from the Kremlin.

Four months later, the new regime collapsed in the face of a military offensive by the Kingdom of Romania. Kun fled to Soviet Russia, where from 1920 he worked as a functionary in the Communist International bureaucracy as head of the Crimean Revolutionary Committee. He organised and actively participated in the Red Terror in Crimea (1920–1921), following which he participated in the 1921 March Action, a failed Communist uprising in Germany.

During the late-1930s Great Purge, Kun was accused as a Trotskyist and was arrested, interrogated, tried, and executed in quick succession. In 1956, following Joseph Stalin's death and the Soviet Union's de-Stalinization under Nikita Khrushchev, he was posthumously rehabilitated by the Soviet leadership.

== Life ==
=== Early life ===
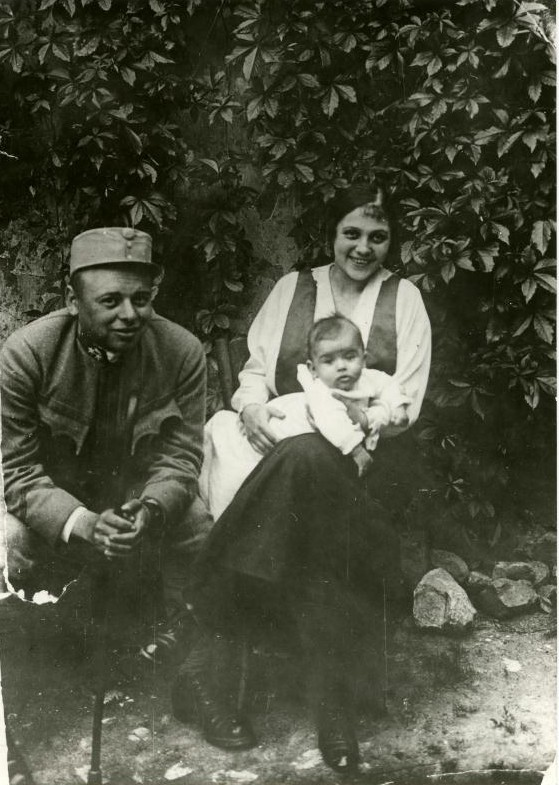
Béla Kun with his family in 1915

Béla Kohn, later known as Béla Kun, was born on 20 February 1886 in the village of Lele, located near Szilágycseh, Szilágy County, Kingdom of Hungary (today part of Hodod, Satu Mare County, Romania). His father, Samu Kohn, was a lapsed Jewish village notary. His mother was Hungarian, but converted to Judaism upon marriage. Despite his parents' secular outlook, he was educated at the Silvania Főgimnázium in Zilah (present-day Silvania National College, Zalău) and a famous Reformed kollegium (grammar school) in the city of Kolozsvár (now Cluj-Napoca, Romania).

At the kollegium Kun won the prize for best essay on Hungarian literature, which allowed him to attend a gymnasium. His essay was on the poet Sándor Petőfi and the concluding paragraphs were:

The storming rage of Petőfi's soul... turned against the privileged classes, against the people's oppressor... and confronted them with revolutionary abandon. Petőfi felt that the country would not be saved through moderation, but through the use of the most extreme means available. He detested even the thought of cowardice... Petőfi's vision was correct. There is no room for prudence in revolutions whose fate and eventual success is always decided by boldness and raw courage... this is why Petőfi condemned his compatriots for the sin of opportunism and hesitation when faced with the great problems of their age... Petőfi's works must be regarded as the law of the Hungarian soul... and of the... love of the country".

In 1904 he began to study law at Franz Joseph University in Kolozsvár. Béla magyarized his birth surname, Kohn, to Kun in 1904, although the almanac of the university still referred to him in print by his former name as late as 1909. There is no archival evidence that he took any formal action to change the spelling of his name, although it is clear that from 1904 all those around him referred to him as Béla Kun rather than Kohn, and he likewise used the Magyar variant in his signature.

Before World War I, he was a muck-raking journalist with sympathies for the Hungarian Social Democratic Party in Kolozsvár. In addition, Kun served on the Kolozsvár Social Insurance Board, from which he was later to be accused of embezzling. He had a fiery reputation and was involved in duels several times. In May 1913 he married Irén Gál, a music teacher of middle-class background from Nagyenyed (today Aiud, Alba County); they had two children, Ágnes, born in 1915, and Miklós, born in 1920.

=== Early political career ===
During his early education at Kolozsvár, Kun became friends with the poet Endre Ady, who introduced him to many members of Budapest's left-wing intelligentsia.

=== Russian civil war ===
Kun fought with the Austro-Hungarian Army in World War I, and was captured and made a prisoner of war in 1916 by the Imperial Russian Army. He was sent to a prisoner of war camp in the Tomsk, where he was exposed to Communism. The Russian Revolution in March 1917 and the subsequent Bolshevik coup the following November not only set him free, but provided him with unforeseen opportunities.

In March 1918, in Moscow, Kun co-founded the Hungarian Group of the Russian Communist Party (the predecessor to the Party of Communists in Hungary) with other former Hungarian POWs. He travelled widely, including to Petrograd and Moscow. He came to know Vladimir Lenin there, but inside the party he promoted ultra-radical left-wing political opposition to Lenin and the mainstream Bolsheviks. Kun and his friends, such as the Italian Umberto Terracini and the Hungarian Mátyás Rákosi, aggregated around Grigory Zinoviev or Karl Radek. Whereas Lenin advocated making peace with the Central Powers, despite the harsh conditions they imposed, in order to "save the revolution", Kun and his group took the side of Nikolai Bukharin, who wanted to continue and expand the war to transform it into an international revolutionary struggle to impose Communism on the rest of Europe. Lenin often called them "kunerists", and said of Kun, "We can see that this man comes from a country of poets and dreamers."

In the Russian Civil War in 1918, Kun fought for the Bolsheviks and had a large recruitment network. Many Hungarians who were driven by prior socialist sympathies along with other factors such as oppression under Tsarist guards, coming from peasant backgrounds and willingness to fight the Czechoslovak Legion caused 80-100,000 Hungarians to end up in the Bolshevik Internationalist Army. These internationalist Hungarians played a key role in the Bolshevik victory and the defeat of the Czechoslovak Legion. During this time, he first started to make detailed plans for a Communist revolution in Hungary. In November 1918, with at least several hundred other Hungarian Communists and with a large sum of money provided by the Soviets, he returned to Hungary.

=== Hungarian People's Republic ===
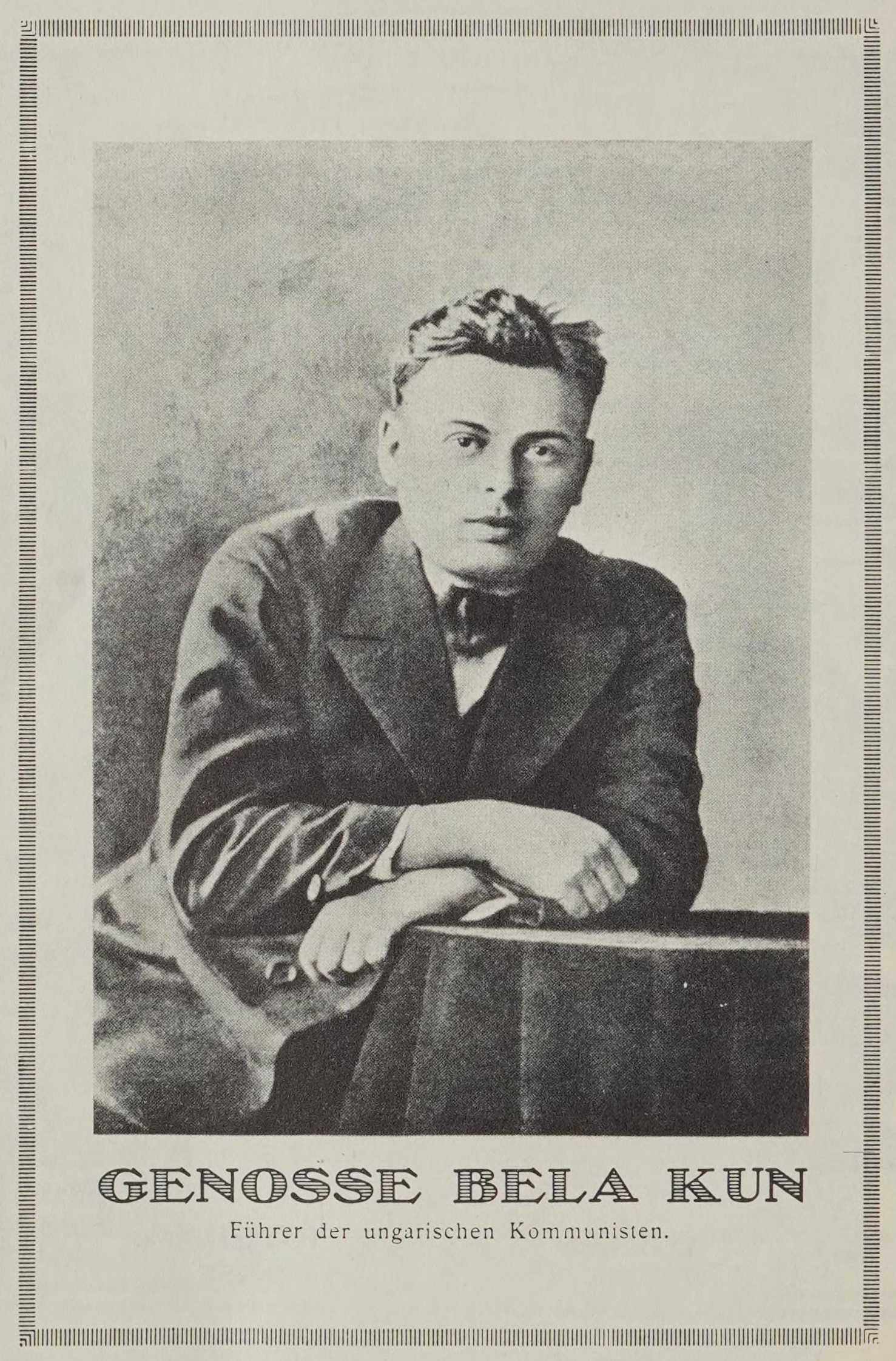
Kun in a 1919 Comintern publication

In Hungary, the resources of a shattered government were further strained by refugees from lands lost to the Allies during the war, and which were due to be lost permanently under the Treaty of Trianon. Rampant inflation, housing shortages, mass unemployment, food shortages and coal shortages further weakened the economy and stimulated widespread protests. In October 1918, the Aster Revolution saw the inauguration the Hungarian People's Republic, under an unstable coalition government of Socialists and other radicals. Led by Béla Kun, the inner circle of the freshly established party returned to Budapest from Moscow on 16 November 1918. On 24 November they created the Party of Communists from Hungary (Hungarian: Kommunisták Magyarországi Pártja).

He immediately began a highly energetic propaganda campaign against the government of President Mihály Károlyi, and his Social Democratic allies, accusing them of betraying the working class, of lack of class consciousness, of not wanting to continue the expropriation of large domains and the big capital. His aim was to copy the tactics Lenin had used so successfully, which included pandering to the demands of all the discontented in society: unemployed, pensioners, veterans, employees; relentlessly denouncing the Government and the parties that supported it; as well as infiltrating the trade unions, discrediting their executives, and undermining the Socialist Party by dividing the more moderate leaders from the more extreme ones.

His speeches had a considerable impact on his audiences. One who heard such a speech wrote in his diary:

Yesterday I heard Kun speak... it was an audacious, hateful, enthusiastic oratory. [...] He knows his audience and rules over them... Factory workers long at odds with the Social Democratic Party leaders, young intellectuals, teachers, doctors, lawyers, clerks who came to his room... meet Kun and Marxism.

In addition, the Communists held frequent marches and rallies and organised strikes. Desiring to achieve a revolution in Hungary, he communicated by telegraph with Vladimir Lenin to garner support from the Bolsheviks, which would ultimately not materialise.

Despite Kun's efforts, by February 1919 the Communists had fewer than 30,000 members, compared with the 700,000 of the Social Democrats. Kun knew that if the upcoming elections went ahead, they would be a disaster for the Communists. Therefore, the Communist press launched a campaign against a fictitious "reactionary conspiracy" which they claimed the Károlyi government was either unaware of, or unwilling to crush. On 20 February 1919 the Communists invaded and pillaged the headquarters of the Socialist daily newspaper. The attack left a few dead and many injured, primarily policemen who had tried to stop the Communist aggression. Kun and 67 other Communist leaders were arrested.

However, despite the apparent failure of this adventure, there were two factors that worked to Kun's advantage. First, the press, even the non-socialist press, claimed that the imprisoned Communists had been mistreated by some members of the police force that supposedly wanted to avenge the death of their colleagues, and also publicised the supposedly courageous attitude of prisoner Béla Kun, a man previously little known outside his circle of followers. This greatly increased the popularity of Kun and sympathy toward the Communists among the general public. Concerned by this unintended shift in public opinion, the government gave orders that while in prison Kun be allowed to carry out any political activity he wished, which meant he was able to continue directing the Hungarian Communist Party from his cell. There were days in which Kun received up to four hundred visitors, mainly far-left Social Democrats who now considered Kun, whose stature was already increased by the prestige of participating in the Bolshevik Revolution in Russia, a martyr.

The second was that on 19 March 1919, French Lt-Col Fernand Vix presented the "Vix Note", ordering Hungarian forces to be pulled back further from where they were stationed, clearing the areas of Debrecen and Makó. It was assumed that the military lines would be the new frontiers that would be established by the peace conference between Hungary and the Allies. Károlyi resigned, perhaps in order not to link his name to the acceptance of that imposition, and soon after a proclamation was made public in his name stating that he had voluntarily given up his powers to a "new government of the proletariat", i.e., the Socialists. Later in his life Károlyi denied that he had made such a statement, though he did not disavow it at the time or in the following years during which he remained quietly in Hungary. The Vix Note created a massive upsurge of nationalist outrage, and the Hungarians resolved to fight the Allies rather than accept the new demarcation lines.

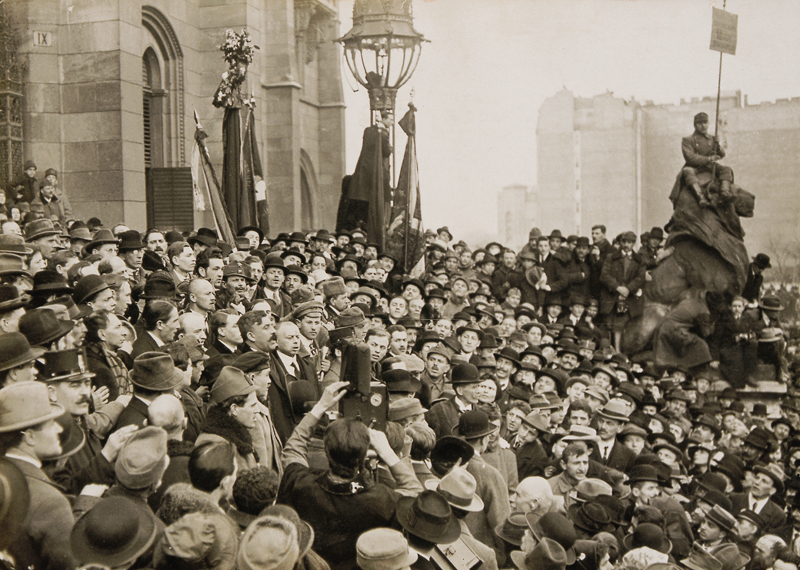
Sándor Garbai and Béla Kun, leaders of the Hungarian Soviet Republic, 1919

The Social Democrats approached Kun on the subject of a coalition government, hoping he would be able to use his Bolshevik connections to bring the Red Army to Hungary's aid. So desperate were they for support from Moscow that it was Kun, a captive, who dictated the terms to his captors. This was despite the Red Army's full involvement in the Russian Civil War and the unlikelihood that it could be of any direct military assistance. Kun proposed the merger of the Social Democrat and Communist parties, the establishment of a Soviet Republic and several other radical measures, which the Social Democrats agreed to.

=== Hungarian Soviet Republic ===
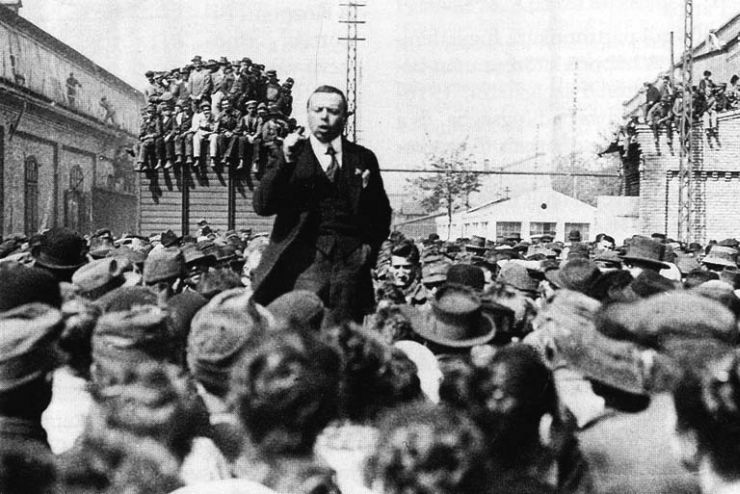
Béla Kun was the leader of the Hungarian Revolution of 1919

On 21 March 1919, the Hungarian Soviet Republic, the second Communist regime in Europe after Russia itself, was proclaimed; the Social Democrats and the Communists merged under the interim name Hungarian Socialist Party, and Béla Kun was released from prison and sworn into office.

The nominal head of the Soviet Republic was a Socialist leader, Sándor Garbai, but in practice power rested with Kun, although officially he was only People's Commissar for Foreign Affairs, and from April 1919 also People's Commissar for Defence. As he told Lenin, "My personal influence in the Revolutionary Governing Council is such that the dictatorship of the proletariat is firmly established, since the masses are backing me."

The Social Democrats continued to hold the majority of seats in government. Of the thirty-three People's Commissars of the Revolutionary Governing Council that ruled the Soviet Republic, fourteen were former Communists, seventeen were former Social Democrats and two had no party affiliation. With the exception of Kun, every Commissar was a former Social Democrat and every Deputy Commissar a former Communist. Despite the fact that the Socialists were by far more numerous, they passively accepted the leadership and the programme of the smaller but far more active and determined Communist Party, which claimed to represent the "dictatorship of the proletariat".

In the hope of placating the new Hungarian regime, the victorious Entente expressed willingness to bring the military demarcation to the line specified by the armistice of Belgrade the previous November, stating however that it would have no relevance to the final clauses of the peace treaty. This gesture was an undeniable success for the Socialist-Communist government which was thus offered some badly needed breathing space. However Kun rejected the proposal, declaring during a rally on 19 April:

Comrades, we do not profess the doctrine of territorial integrity, but we want to live, and this is why we did not accept that our freed proletarian brothers living in the neutralised zone be rejected under the yoke of capitalism. To do so would deprive the Hungarian proletariat of the physical means necessary to live. [...] It is a matter, therefore, which concerns the struggle between the international revolution and the international counter-revolution.

However he stated in a letter to Lenin a few days later, on 22 April, possibly to exculpate himself from the suspicion of harbouring nationalist sentiment:

Whatever happens, all our actions will be dictated by the interests of the world revolution. We do not think even for a moment to sacrifice the interests of the world revolution to those of one of its components. Even if we were obliged to sign a peace 'à la Brest-Litovsk', we would do it with the clear conscience which inspired you when you made the Brest-Litovsk peace, concluded against my will and against the will of the Left Communists.

Given the disparity in power between Hungary and the Allies, Hungarian chances for victory were slim at best. To buy time, Kun tried to negotiate with the Allies, meeting the South African General Jan Smuts at a summit in Budapest in April. Agreement proved impossible, and Hungary was soon at war later in April with the Kingdom of Romania (as part of the Hungarian–Romanian War) and Czechoslovakia (as part of the Hungarian–Czechoslovak War), both aided by France.

The "dictatorship of the proletariat" was characterised from almost the beginning by harsh measures not only against the old ruling classes, but also against the peasants. The first action of the new government was the nationalization of the large majority of private property in Hungary. Despite their promises, Béla Kun's government chose not to redistribute land to the peasantry. Instead, all land was to be converted into collective farms and former estate owners, managers, and bailiffs were to be retained as the new collective farm managers. The Communists remained highly unpopular in the Hungarian countryside, where they had little to no actual authority, and from which the communist paramilitary group the Lenin Boys confiscated food for the cities.

Furthermore, the initial measures of the government in the military field included the elimination of "non-proletarians" from the new Hungarian Red Army, the abolition of conscription and the introduction of voluntary recruitment. The result was catastrophic: in three weeks only 5,000 "workers" had asked to enlist. Equally ineffective were the social measures, beginning with the reduction of the rental fees and wage increases immediately negated by inflation. The failures of the Communists in economic issues meant that in three weeks they were excluded from economic affairs by the ex-Socialists. The Communists, however, retained control of the political police. They unleashed terror gangs of thugs called the Lenin Boys who went hunting for "bourgeois" and "counter-revolutionaries", and committed armed robberies, kidnappings, shootings, and hangings.

This indiscriminate terror, in which Kun's friends, Tibor Szamuely and Ottó Korvin, proved especially bloodthirsty, attracted protests from the sole representative of the Allied governments in Budapest, Italian lieutenant colonel Guido Romanelli, which Kun rejected. It also had the effect of splitting the government and dividing the Communists themselves, some of whom doubted the usefulness of the atrocities committed. Kun proved unable to control his more extreme followers, particularly Ferenc Jancsik, Ferenc Münnich, Szamuely, and Mátyás Rákosi. Members of the government demanded Kun either stop the atrocities committed by his men, or face the hostility of organised workers and unions. In response Kun sent his friends as political commissars to the front where, however, the situation was not much better.

The Romanian Army had launched an offensive on 17 April 1919, and by the end of the month they were only 60 kilometres (37 mi) from Budapest. On 26 April, Kun was forced to admit publicly that he had made a mistake in rejecting the proposals of the Allies, and spoke of resignation. The leaders of the trade unions still controlled by ex-Socialists recruited an army of 50,000 men who managed to halt the Romanian troops and to reoccupy the most important cities which had been lost in Upper Hungary. However, this victory was attributed to the People' Commissar for Defence, Vilmos Böhm, and his soldiers, all from the Socialist Party, and not to the Communist political commissars Rákosi and Münnich.

In the second half of June, Georges Clemenceau proposed a memorandum that promised a cessation of hostilities by the Entente in return for an immediate evacuation of Upper Hungary by the Hungarian Army, which Kun accepted, though he stated in a speech that "The imperialist peace that we are forced to conclude will not last longer than that of Brest-Litovsk, because of the revolution that will inevitably burst out in other European countries." One of these "inevitable" revolutions was to be the insurrection Hungarian Communist agents were planning in neighbouring Austria. However, Austrian police discovered the plot and arrested the organisers the day before the coup was to be carried out.

The domestic situation was rapidly worsening as a result of the regime's actions, with not only former army officers and Catholic and Protestant clergy but urban workers, the Communist's primary base of support, becoming increasingly disaffected. On 24 June, an uprising against the regime in Budapest was suppressed after twenty hours of fighting in the streets. At the same time an anarchist conspiracy was uncovered and suppressed (its members shot) in Budapest and other cities. The government retaliated with secret police, revolutionary tribunals and semiregular detachments such as Tibor Szamuely's bodyguards, the Lenin Boys; this renewed campaign of repression became known as the Red Terror. Of those arrested, an estimated 370 to about 600 were killed; others place the number at 590. Subsequently, the White Terror that followed the fall of the Communist regime claimed 10 times as many victims.

At the front, the Hungarians had suffered repeated defeats at the hands of the Romanians. In the middle of July 1919, Hungary launched a major counter-offensive against the Romanian invasion. The Allied Commander in the Balkans, the French Marshal Louis Franchet d'Esperey, wrote to Marshal Ferdinand Foch on 21 July 1919:

We are convinced that the Hungarian offensive will collapse of its own accord... When the Hungarian offensive is launched, we shall retreat to the line of demarcation and launch the counteroffensive from that line. Two Romanian brigades will march from Romania to the front in the coming days, according to General Fertianu's promise. You see, Marshal, we have nothing to fear from the Hungarian army. I can assure you that the Hungarian Soviets will last no more than two or three weeks. And should our offensive not bring the Kun regime down, its untenable internal situation surely will.

The Bolsheviks promised to invade Romania and link up with Kun and were on the verge of doing so, but military reversals suffered by the Red Army in Ukraine halted the invasion of Romania before it began. When the Romanian Army crossed the river Tisza at the end of July they met virtually no opposition. However, by this point the regime was facing, in Kun's own words, a "crisis of power, economy and morale" and most fatally, of popular support. The former Social Democrats had withdrawn completely from government; the rural peasantry were disillusioned by the unfulfilled promises of land redistribution and by the decision of the regime to pay for agricultural products in a new paper currency they did not trust. Most fatally, the "industrial proletariat" in whose name the dictatorship had been established refused to fight for a cause they no longer considered their own.

The only hope for saving the Hungarian Soviet Republic had been "the military intervention of the Red Army or a revolution in one or more other European countries." Both these hopes had now failed. On 1 August, Kun gave his last speech in Hungary, stating:

The Hungarian proletariat betrayed not their leaders but itself. [...] If there had been in Hungary a proletariat with the consciousness of the dictatorship of the proletariat it would not collapse in this way [...] I would have liked to see the proletariat fighting on the barricades declaring that it would rather die than give up power. [...] The proletariat which continued to shout in factories, 'Down with the dictatorship of the proletariat', will be even less satisfied with any future government."

He fled to Austria a few hours after, and the Romanian forces took Budapest three days later. Historian and former Italian diplomat to Hungary Alberto Indelicato attributed the downfall of the regime not to external military intervention by the allies, but to the regime's own internal flaws, stating

Whereas the "dictatorship of the proletariat" could be proclaimed as a result of international political events which weighed heavily on the whole affair, the fall of "the Republic of Councils" did not occur because of the intervention of the reactionary circles of the Entente or of the "White" Hungarian counter-revolution (as a Communist legend maintains and is still affirmed by some partisan historians), but because of its inherent weaknesses, the consequence of its internal, social and economic policies.

=== Activity in Crimea ===
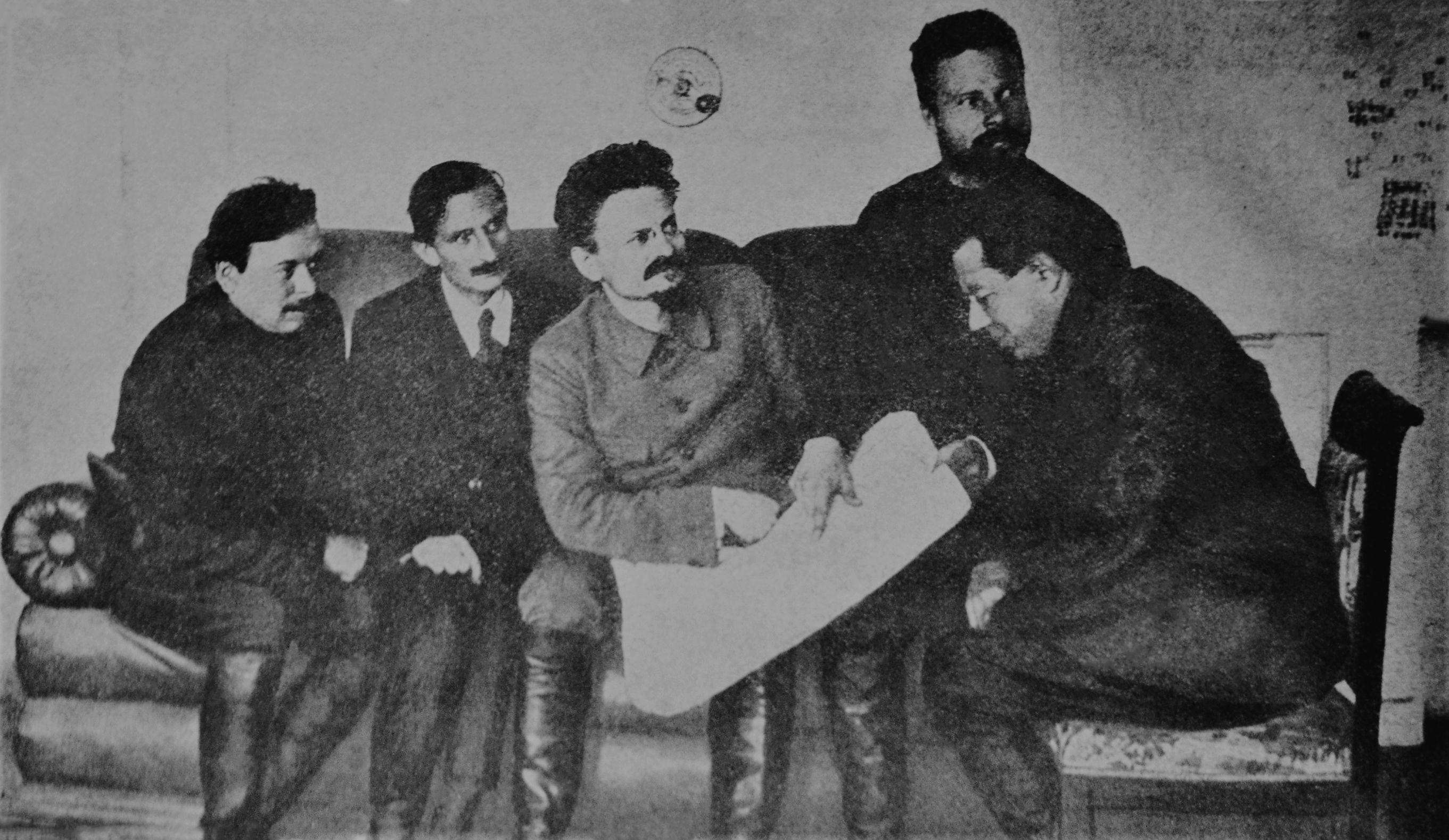
From left: Béla Kun, Alfred Rosmer, Leon Trotsky, Mikhail Frunze and Sergey Gusev. Kharkiv, Ukraine in 1920, during the Russian Civil War.

Béla Kun went into exile in Vienna, then controlled by the Social Democratic Party of Austria. He was captured and interned in Austria, where he spent his time interned at the Karlstein castle, together with the majority of the former People's Commissars of the Hungarian Soviet Republic. Conditions for the internees were difficult: the castle's rooms were not heated, and all the internees contracted scabies due to the castle's unsanitary health conditions. Despite these hardships, during his permanence in the castle Kun was able to give interviews to visiting American, British, and Italian journalists. In February 1920, Kun and the other People's Commissars were transferred to Steinhof and confined to a wing of the local mental asylum.

During their stay at Steinhof, the People's Commissars survived two attempted murders. White Hungarians attempted to storm the building and execute the People's Commissars, but were deterred by the Austrian police. On April 4, Easter Sunday, a package signed "from comrades in Vienna" was delivered to the asylum. The package contained chocolate, oranges, and other desserts, which the internees proceeded to share with each other. Within a few hours, they began to exhibit symptoms of poisoning. A later investigation revealed that the sweets had been laced with atropine, but the prompt administration of gastric lavages saved the Commissars from more serious consequences. In July 1920, Béla Kun was released in exchange for Austrian prisoners in Russia. He never returned to Hungary. Once in Russia, he rejoined the Communist Party of the Soviet Union. Kun was put in charge of the regional Revolutionary Committee in Crimea, which during the Russian Civil War changed hands numerous times and was for a time a stronghold for the anti-Bolshevik White Army.

It was in Crimea that the White Russians led by General Wrangel fell to the Red Army in 1920. About 50,000 prisoners of war and anti-Bolshevik civilians who had surrendered after they had been promised amnesty, were subsequently executed, on Kun's and Rosalia Zemlyachka's order, with Lenin's approval. Mass arrests and executions were carried out under Kun's administration. Between 60,000 and 70,000 inhabitants of the Crimea were murdered in the process. The figures related to the massacre in Crimea remain contested. Anarchist and Bolshevik Victor Serge gave a lower figure for White officers around 13,000 which he claims were exaggerated. Yet, he condemned Kun for his treacherous actions towards allied anarchists and surrendering whites. According to social scientist, Nikolay Zayats, from the National Academy of Sciences of Belarus the large, “fantastic” estimates derived from eyewitness accounts and White army émigré press. A Crimean Cheka report in 1921 showed that 441 people were shot with a modern estimation that 5,000–12,000 people in total were executed in Crimea.

=== The "March Action" in Germany ===
Kun became a leading figure in the Comintern as an ally of Grigory Zinoviev. In March 1921, he was sent to Germany to advise the Communist Party of Germany (KPD) and encouraged the KPD to follow the "Theory of the Offensive" as supported by Zinoviev, August Thalheimer, Paul Frölich, and others which in the words of Ruth Fischer meant "the working class could be moved only when set in motion by a series of offensive acts." On 27 March, leaders of the Communist Party of Germany decided to launch a "revolutionary offensive" in support of miners in central Germany. Kun along with Thallheimer were among the driving force behind the attempted revolutionary campaign known as "Märzaktion" ("March Action") that failed.

In the end, Lenin blamed himself for appointing Kun and charged him with responsibility for the failure of the German revolution. He was considerably angered by Kun's actions and his failure to secure a general uprising in Germany. In a closed Congress of the Operative Committee — as Victor Serge writes — Lenin called his actions idiotic ("les bêtises de Béla Kun"). György Lukács, moreover, claimed that Kun acted through "demagogy, violence and, if need be, bribery", and recounted an incident in the summer of 1920 when it was discovered that Kun bribed his supporters by sending them gold deliveries (he had supposedly stolen the gold from requisitioning that was carried out in the Russian Revolution). László Rudas admitted to receiving gold from Kun. But Kun did not lose his membership in the Operative Committee, and the closing document accepted at the end of the sitting formally acknowledged the "battle spirit" of the German Communists.

Kun was not stripped of his Party offices, but the March Action was the end of the radical opposition and of the theory of "Permanent Offensive". Lenin wrote,

The final analysis of things shows that Levi was politically right in many ways. The thesis of Thallheimer and Béla Kun is politically totally false. Phrases and bare attending, playing the radical leftist.

Throughout the 1920s Kun was a prominent Comintern operative, serving mostly in Germany, Austria and Czechoslovakia, but his notoriety ultimately stopped him from being useful for undercover work.

=== Later career ===
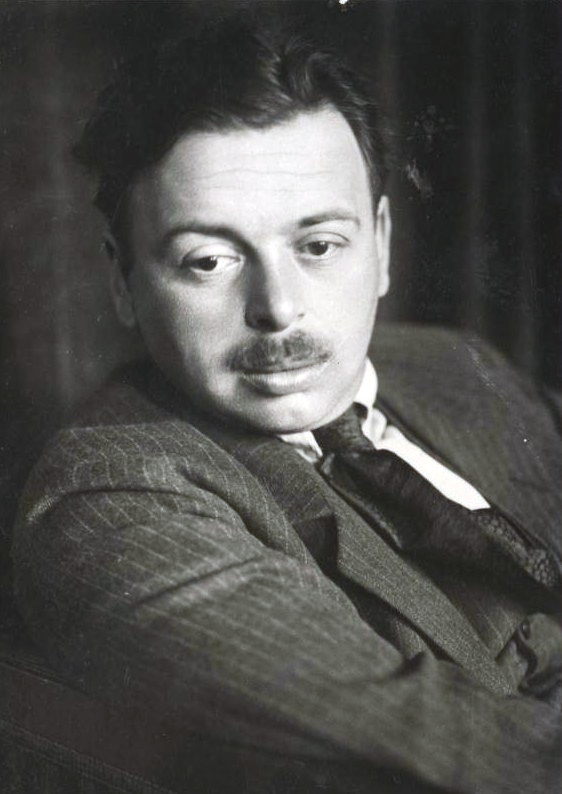
Béla Kun in 1922

Kun's final undercover assignment ended in 1928 when he was arrested in Vienna by the local police for travelling on a forged passport. Back in Moscow, he spent much of his time feuding with other Hungarian Communist émigrés, several of whom he denounced to the Soviet secret police, the OGPU, which arrested and imprisoned them in the late 1920s and early 1930s. During the Comintern's "Third Period" from 1928 to 1935, Kun was a prominent supporter of the Social Fascism line that revealed the Social-Democrats' role as "social fascism" because they sought the preservation of capitalism precisely when it was in crisis, an animosity in large part owing to Kun's strained relations with the Hungarian Social Democrats, whom he believed had betrayed him sixteen years earlier.

In 1934, Kun was charged with preparing the agenda for the 7th Congress of the Comintern, in which the Social Fascism line was to be abandoned and the Popular Front was to be the new line for Communists all over the world, a policy change that Kun opposed. Instead of submitting to party discipline, Kun did his best to sabotage the adoption of the Popular Front policy, which led to his formal sanction for insubordination.

In 1935–36, the leadership of the émigré Hungarian Communist Party was thrown into crisis as Kun sought to prevent the adoption of the Popular Front policy, which occasioned a vigorous round of party in-fighting. Beyond policy, there was also a clash of personalities as Kun's abrasive and autocratic leadership style had left him with many enemies. These individuals saw the dispute over whether the Hungarian Communist Party was to adopt the Popular Front strategy as a chance to bring down Kun, whom many Hungarian émigrés deeply hated. His embattled position led Kun to denounce one of his leading enemies in the Comintern, Dmitry Manuilsky, to the NKVD as a "Trotskyite"; in turn, Manuilsky, who was sympathetic to the anti-Kun faction, had also denounced Kun to the NKVD as a "Trotskyite".

=== Death and legacy ===
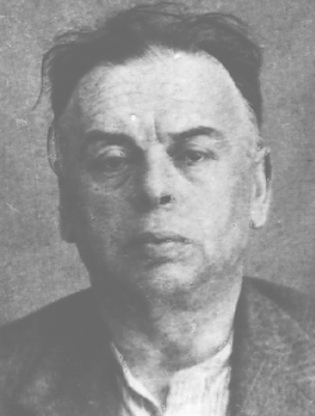
Official mug shot of Béla Kun, taken by the NKVD after his arrest in 1937.

During the Great Purge of the late 1930s, Kun was accused of Trotskyism and arrested by the NKVD on 28 June 1937. Little was known about his fate beyond the fact that he never returned. Even an official Hungarian Communist biographer with official access to the Communist International's archives in Moscow was denied information during the mid-1970s.

Only some time after the dissolution of the Soviet Union and the opening of certain archives in the aftermath did Kun's fate become public. After a brief incarceration and interrogation, he was hauled before a judicial troika on charges of having acted as the leader of a "counter-revolutionary terrorist organization". Kun was found guilty and sentenced to death at the end of the brief secret trial. The sentence was carried out later that day at the Kommunarka shooting ground.

When Kun was politically rehabilitated in 1956, as part of de-Stalinization, the Soviet Communist Party told its Hungarian counterpart that Kun had died in prison on 30 November 1939. In 1989, the Soviet government acknowledged that Kun had actually been executed in the Kommunarka more than a year earlier than that, on 29 August 1938. After the Second World War the Soviets set up the Marxist–Leninist Hungarian People's Republic under the leadership of Mátyás Rákosi, one of Kun's few surviving colleagues from the 1919 coup.

== Notes ==
Political offices
Preceded by Ferenc Harrer	People's Commissar of Foreign Affairs alongside others 21 March – 1 August 1919	Succeeded by Péter Ágoston
