= Sándor Garbai =

Prime Minister of Hungary in 1919

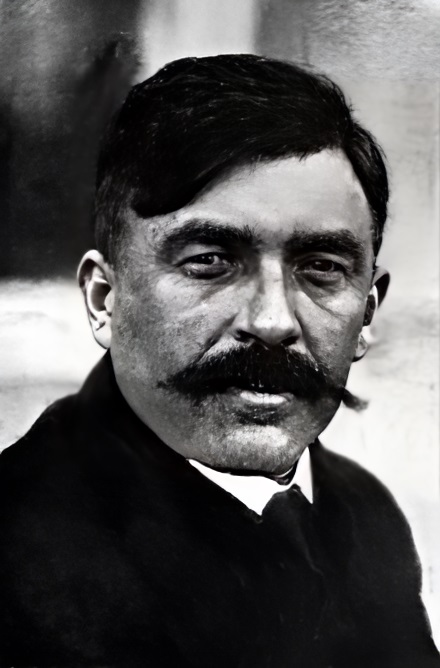
- Garbai in 1919

Chairman of the Hungarian Central Executive Council
- In office 21 March 1919 – 1 August 1919
- Prime Minister: Himself
- Preceded by: Mihály Károlyi (as President of Hungary)
- Succeeded by: Gyula Peidl

Prime Minister of Hungary
- In office 21 March 1919 – 1 August 1919
- Chairman: Himself
- Preceded by: Dénes Berinkey
- Succeeded by: Gyula Peidl

Personal details
- Born: 27 March 1879 Kiskunhalas, Hungary, Austria-Hungary
- Died: 7 November 1947 (aged 68) Paris, France
- Party: Hungarian Social Democratic Party; Socialist-Communist Workers' Party of Hungary
- Spouse: Zsófia Pötördi
- Profession: Politician, journalist

Sándor Garbai (27 March 1879 – 7 November 1947) was a Hungarian socialist politician who was the de jure leader of the Hungarian Soviet Republic as both its head of state and prime minister in 1919.

== Life and political career ==
Garbai was born into the family of a Protestant bricklayer. An active participant in the labor movement from a young age, he joined the Social Democratic Party of Hungary (MSZDP) in 1901 and quickly rose through its ranks.

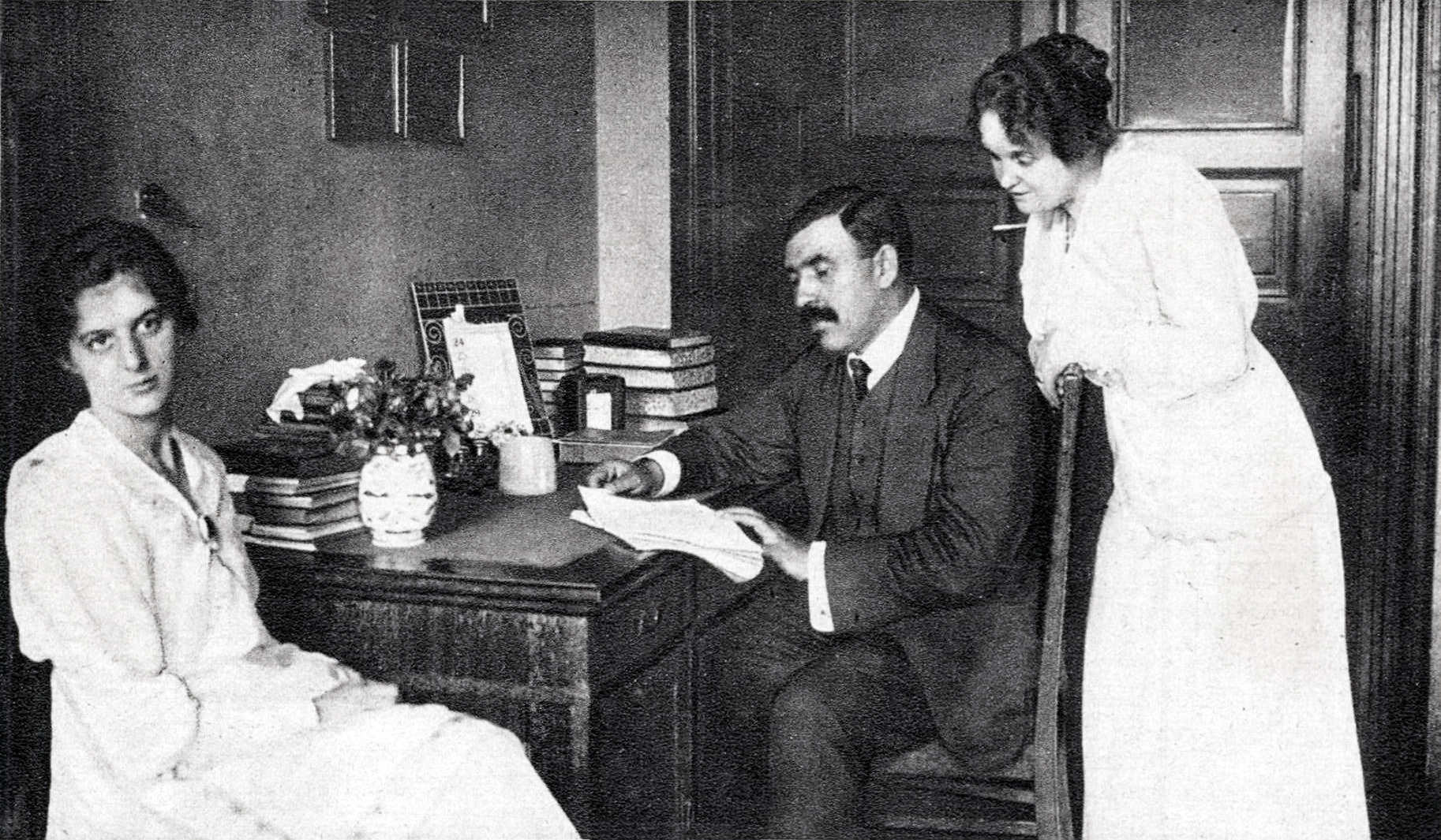
Garbai with his family in 1917

From 1908 he was the chairman of the Workers' Insurance Fund and during the First Hungarian Republic he headed the All National Housing Council. He was in favour of the merger of the MSZDP with the Hungarian Communist Party which occurred on 21 March 1919. This led to the foundation of the Hungarian Soviet Republic, with Garbai as the Chairman of the Central Executive Council, both head of state and prime minister. Although Garbai remained titular leader of the Soviet Republic for the better part of its existence, the de facto leader of the state was Communist foreign minister Béla Kun.

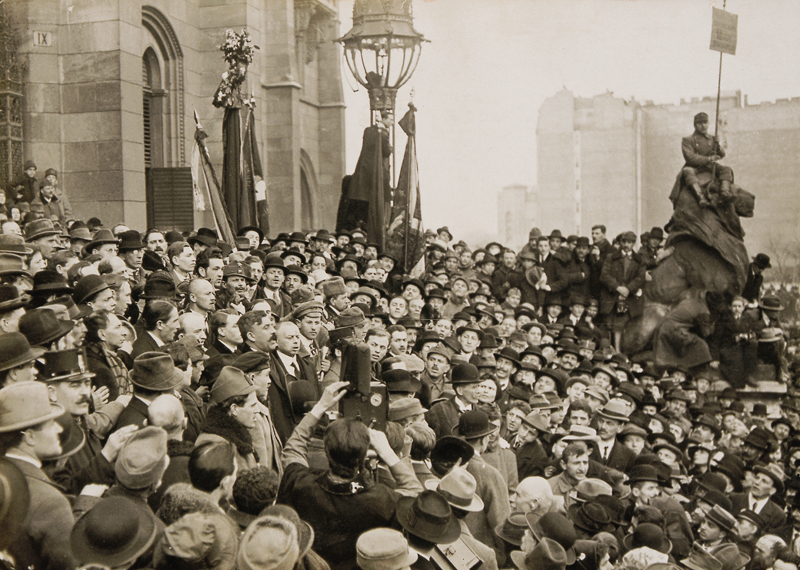
Garbai speaking with Béla Kun after the proclamation of the Soviet Republic

After the fall of the Soviet Republic, he was arrested by the Romanian military. Fearing reprisals, Garbai escaped from Romanian captivity in Cluj and fled to Czechoslovakia and first in settled Bratislava and then emigrated to Vienna. He was a leader of the centrist Marxist movement among the Hungarian political refugees. With his family, he opened a restaurant in Vienna, where he hosted former communist and other socialist leaders. The restaurant soon went bankrupt, Garbai suffered huge financial losses and lived in poverty for the rest of his lifetime. After leaving Austria in 1934 due to the victory of the right-wing Fatherland Front, he settled in Bratislava, and in 1938, in Paris.

During the German occupation of France he did not participate in the French Resistance, although the underground tried to recruit him. He was also not bothered by the German occupiers. After the liberation of Hungary, Garbai and his family desired to return to their homeland but their request was rejected.

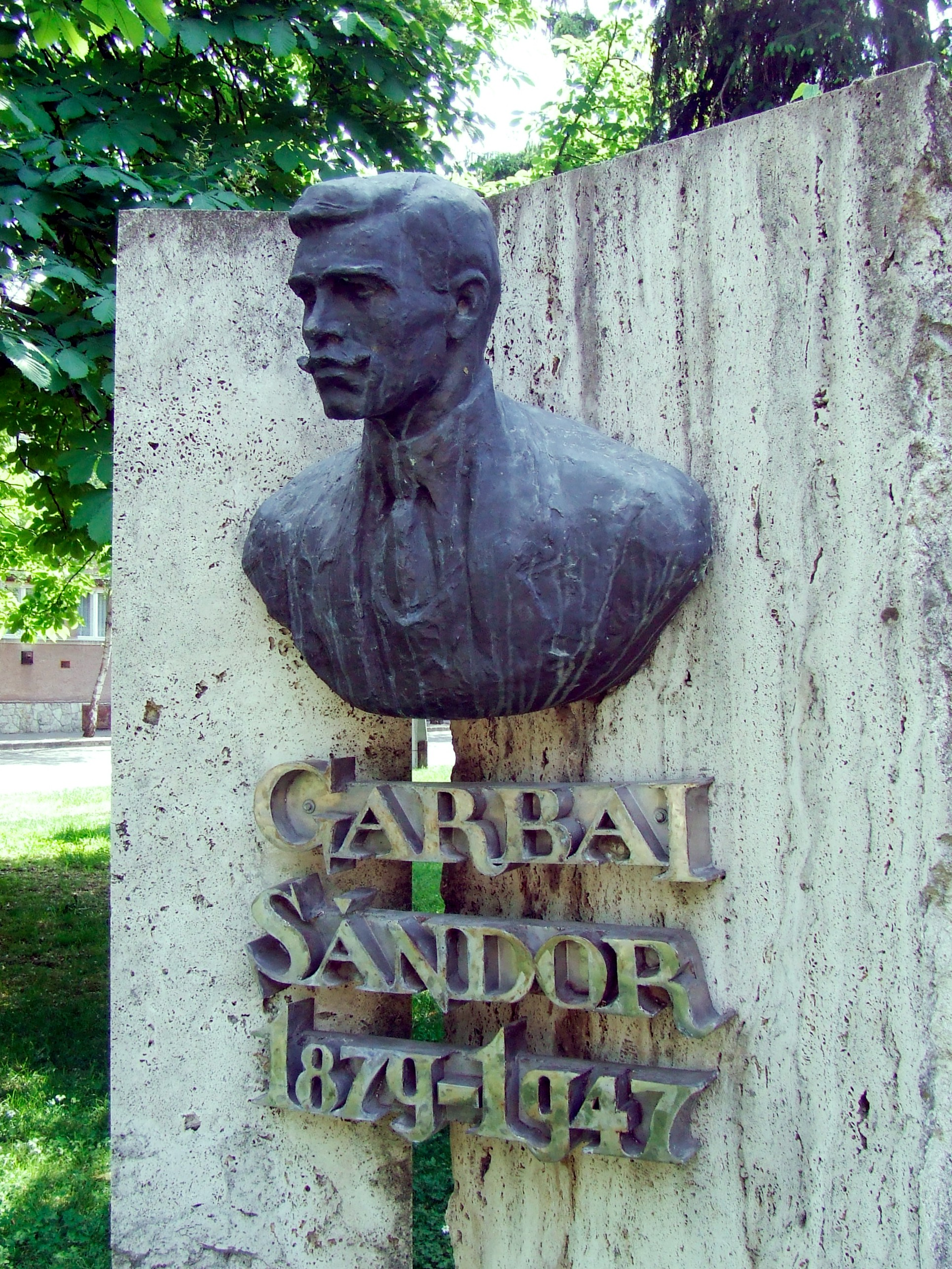
Bust of Garbai

Garbai remained in Paris where he died on 7 November 1947.

Political offices
Preceded by Mihály Károlyi as Provisional President	Chairman of the Hungarian Central Executive Council; 1919	Succeeded by Gyula Peidl as Prime Minister
Preceded by Dénes Berinkey as Prime Minister	Chairman of the Hungarian Central Executive Council; 1919	Succeeded by Gyula Peidl as Prime Minister
Preceded by József Pogány	Minister of Religion and Education; 1919	Succeeded by Sándor Imre
