= Red Terror (Hungary) =

Repressive period in Hungary (1919)

Hungarian Red Terror
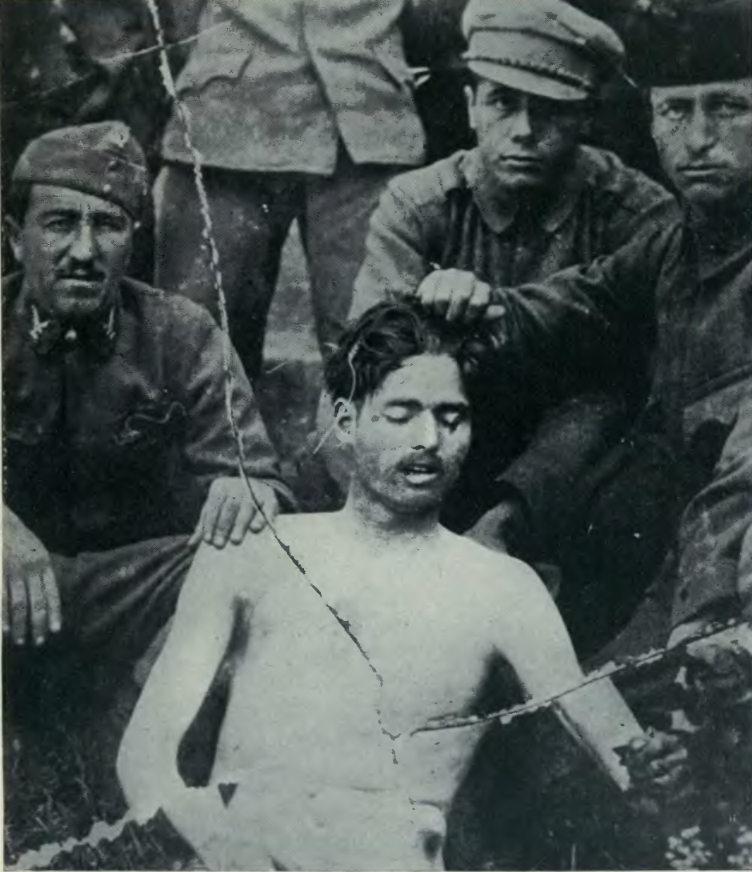
- Lenin Boys pose with the body of one of their victims, Spring 1919
- Date: April – August 1919
- Location: Hungarian Soviet Republic
- Motive: Political repression
- Target: Anti-Communist groups, counter-revolutionaries, and dissidents
- Organized by: Party of Communists in Hungary: Lenin Boys; Hungarian Red Army
- Deaths: 370–590 (estimates)

The Red Terror in Hungary (Hungarian: vörösterror) was a period of repressive violence and suppression carried out by the Hungarian Communist Party in 1919 during the four-month period of the Hungarian Soviet Republic, primarily towards anti-communist forces, and others deemed "enemies of the state".

The new government followed the Bolshevik method: the party established its revolutionary terror groups, such as the Lenin Boys, to "overcome the obstacles" of the worker's revolution. It received its name in reference to the Red Terror in Soviet Russia during the Russian Civil War. It is estimated that up to 590 people were killed in the terror.

== History ==
According to Robin Okey, the communist party and communist policies had considerable popular support among the proletarian masses of large industrial centers - especially in Budapest - where the working class represented a higher ratio of the inhabitants. In the Hungarian countryside, according to John Lukacs, the authority of the government was often nonexistent, serving as a launch-point for anti-communist insurgency.

=== Background ===
In March 1919, the Party of Communists in Hungary, in alliance with the Social Democratic Party of Hungary, gained control of the government of Hungary after president Mihály Károlyi stepped aside and established the Hungarian Soviet Republic. Two months after gaining power, the government attempted to restore Hungary to its pre-World War I boundaries in a series of conflicts with its neighbors. First by recapturing parts of present-day Slovakia, and then attempting to recapture Transylvania from Romania. These unsuccessful recapture attempts, as well as the inefficacy of the government during the war period, lowered the support for the Communist Party, and on June 24 the Social Democratic Party attempted a coup to take control of the government. This attempted coup failed, and in its wake a series of reprisal arrests and lootings occurred in retaliation against the Social Democrats.

Tibor Szamuely wrote in the pages of the Vörös Újság (Red News): "Everywhere counter-revolutionaries run about and swagger; beat them down! Beat their heads where you find them! If counter-revolutionaries were to gain the upper hand for even a single hour, there will be no mercy on any proletarian. Before they stifle the revolution, suffocate them in their own blood!" With their support, József Cserny organized a group of some 200 individuals known as "Lenin Boys" (Lenin-fiúk), whose intention was to uncover "counter-revolutionary" activities in the Hungarian countryside. Similar groups operated within Budapest.

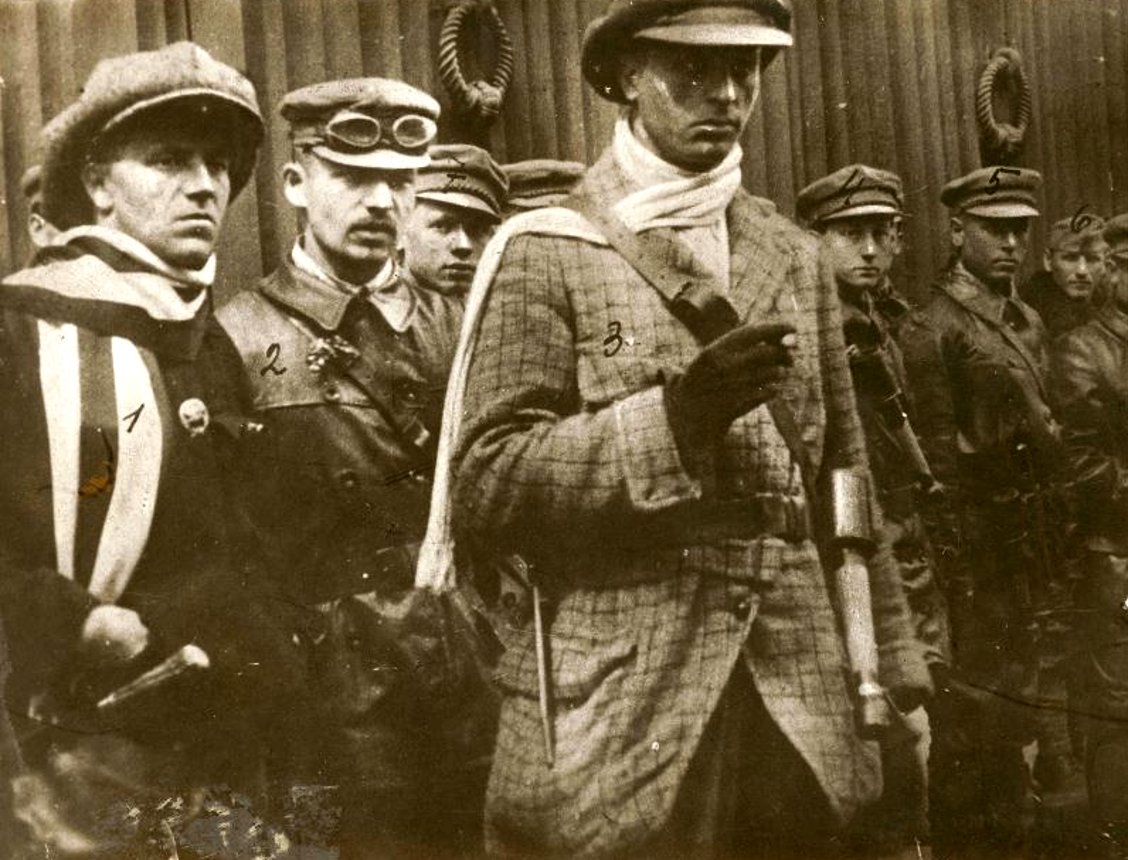
József Cserny, Sándor Papp, and Kornél Radányi pictured with members of the Lenin Boys, 1919.

Checkpoints were established in Budapest, and civilians were regularly arrested and taken away to be tortured with burning cigars, water cure, and nails. In April, Szamuely ordered hostages to be taken in Makó. These included former Speaker of the House of Representatives Lajos Návay, his nephew Iván Návay, and the Mayor of Makó. The hostages were taken by train to Budapest, but along the way, Navay, Iván, and the mayor were forced to dig their own graves along an embankment and shot before they had finished. Using an armored train to travel the country side, the communist would regularly take hostages from random at villages and execute them in advance of invading Romanian or Czech soldiers, or if they believed the village was anti-communist. In addition to mass executions and arrest for "crimes against the revolution", the communist also used the red terror as an excuse to appropriate grain from peasants.

The revolutionary tribunals executed between 370 and 587 of those in custody; others have placed the number at 590.

The Hungarian Soviet Republic ended in the first week of August 1919, when Romanian forces pushed all the way into Budapest. Kun went into exile in Russia; Szamuely fled to Austria, but killed himself after being captured by Austrian authorities. József Cserny was arrested and tried in November 1919; the Hungarian Bar Association refused to defend him at trial, so a lawyer was appointed by the court. He was executed in December along with 13 other members of the Lenin Boys.

After the downfall of the Hungarian Soviet Republic, the Red Terror was answered by a wave of counter-reprisals once the Party of Communists leadership fled. These attacks on leftists, remaining revolutionaries and Jews are known as the "White Terror". According to historian Andrew C. Janos, "this terror was more savage than the random violence practiced by the Red Guard, and, unlike the latter, it quite often became an instrument for settling personal accounts, and even for achieving personal gain".

A monument to the victims of the Red Terror was erected in Budapest in November 2019. It is a reconstruction of a 1934 monument built during the rule of Miklós Horthy.

== See also ==
- Red Terror
- Revolutionary terror
- White Terror (Hungary)
