= Armistice of Belgrade =

1918 armistice between Hungary and the Allied powers

- Type: Multilateral treaty
- Context: Cessation of hostilities between the Allies and Hungary
- Signed: 13 November 1918
- Location: Belgrade, Kingdom of Serbia
- Negotiators: (France) Louis Franchet d'Espèrey; (Kingdom of Hungary) Mihály Károlyi
- Signatories: (France) Paul Prosper Henrys; (Kingdom of Serbia) Živojin Mišić; (Kingdom of Hungary) Béla Linder
- Parties: Allies of World War I; Kingdom of Hungary
- Language: French

The armistice of Belgrade was an agreement on the termination of World War I hostilities between the Allied and Associated Powers and the Kingdom of Hungary concluded in Belgrade on 13 November 1918. It was largely negotiated by General Louis Franchet d'Espèrey, as the commanding officer of the Allied Army of the Orient, and Hungarian Prime Minister Mihály Károlyi, on 7 November. It was signed by General Paul Prosper Henrys and vojvoda Živojin Mišić, as representatives of the Allies, and by the former Hungarian Minister of War, Béla Linder.

The agreement defined a demarcation line marking the southern limit of deployment of most Hungarian armed forces. It left large parts of the Lands of the Crown of Saint Stephen (the Hungarian part of Austria-Hungary) outside Hungarian control – including parts or entire regions of Transylvania, Banat, Bačka, Baranya, as well as Croatia-Slavonia. It also spelled out in eighteen points the obligations imposed on Hungary by the Allies. Those obligations included Hungary's armed forces being reduced to eight divisions, the clearing of naval mines, as well as the turning over of certain quantities of rolling stock, river ships, tugboats, barges, river monitors, horses and other materiel to the Allies. Hungary was also obliged to make certain personnel available to repair wartime damage inflicted on Serbia's telegraph infrastructure, as well as to provide personnel to staff railways.

The terms of the armistice and the subsequent actions of the Allies embittered a significant part of Hungary's population and caused the downfall of Károlyi and the First Hungarian Republic, which had been established only 3 days after its signing. In 1919, the First Hungarian Republic was replaced by the short-lived, communist-ruled Hungarian Soviet Republic. Much of the Allied-occupied territories determined by the demarcation line (and additional territories elsewhere) were detached from Hungary through the 1920 Treaty of Trianon.

== Background ==
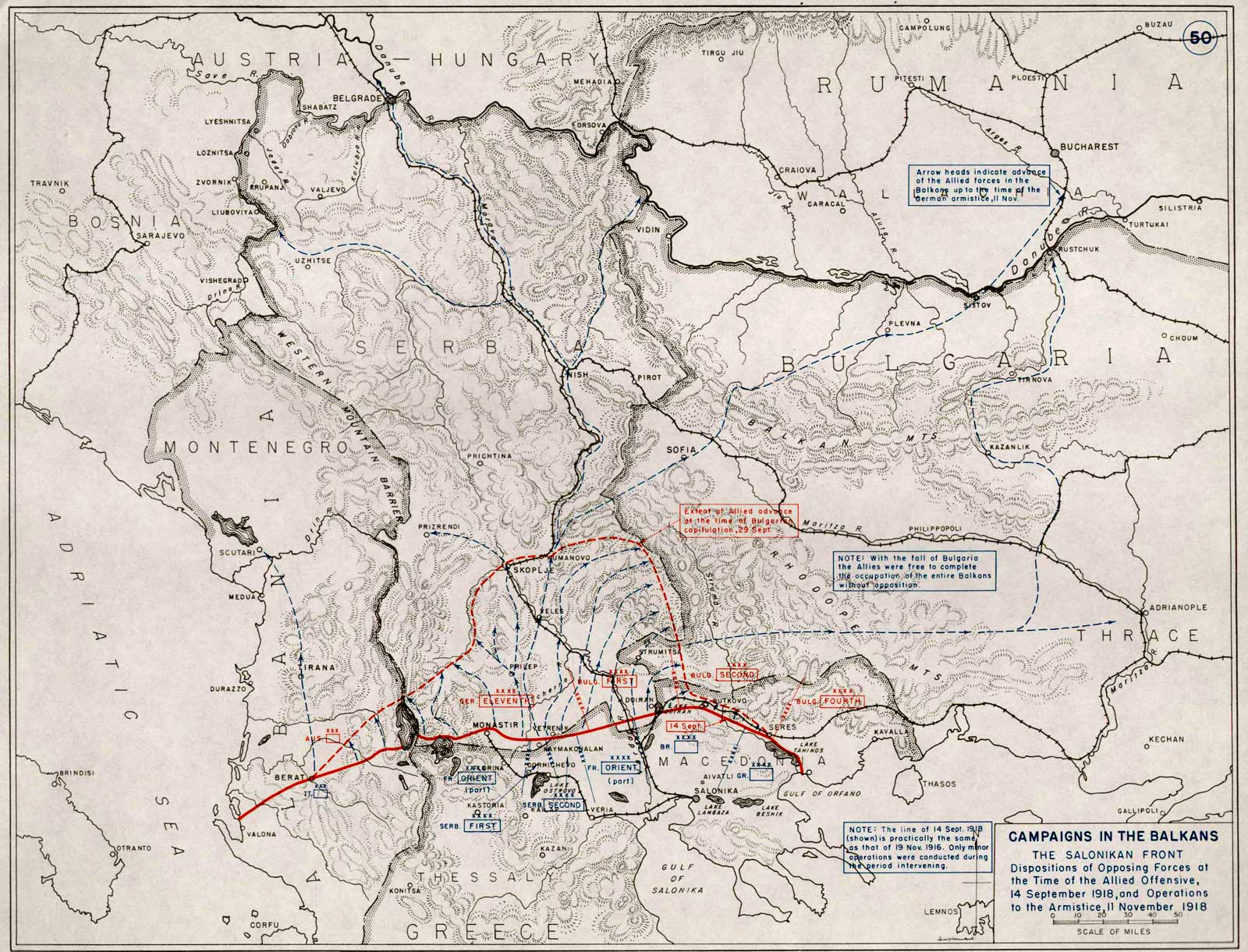
Allied advance on the Macedonian front, September–November 1918

On 29 September 1918, in the final stages of World War I, Bulgaria signed the armistice of Salonica following the collapse of its defensive positions at the Macedonian front and withdrew from the war. The Allied Army of the Orient, commanded by French General Louis Franchet d'Espèrey, rapidly advanced north as a result, recapturing ground that had been lost to the Central Powers in 1915. By 1 November, the Serbian First Army under vojvoda Petar Bojović and the French Armée d'Orient, led by General Paul Prosper Henrys, reached Belgrade. Once there, the troops stopped to rest, with only minimal forces deployed across the Danube and Sava rivers, which represented Serbia's pre-war border with Austria-Hungary. The liberation of Serbia was largely complete.

By the second half of October 1918, Austria-Hungary was rapidly disintegrating, despite Charles I of Austria's offer to federalise the empire. In the Lands of the Crown of Saint Stephen (the Hungarian part of the dual monarchy), the government was deposed as a result of the 28–31 October Aster Revolution, and then replaced by the Hungarian National Council, which was led by Mihály Károlyi. Due to his pacifist views, Károlyi was the most popular Hungarian politician at the time. On 29 October, the Sabor of Croatia-Slavonia broke its legal ties with Austria-Hungary, and the State of Slovenes, Croats and Serbs (comprising the South Slavic-inhabited Habsburg lands) became independent. As the newly proclaimed authorities seized power, violence became widespread outside the capitals. Tens of thousands of army deserters, known as Green Cadres, resorted to banditry and looting for survival. Representatives of the State of Slovenes, Croats and Serbs met with Serbian Prime Minister Nikola Pašić in Geneva on 6–9 November to discuss the creation of a unified South Slavic state, which even then was sometimes referred to as Yugoslavia.

== Prelude ==
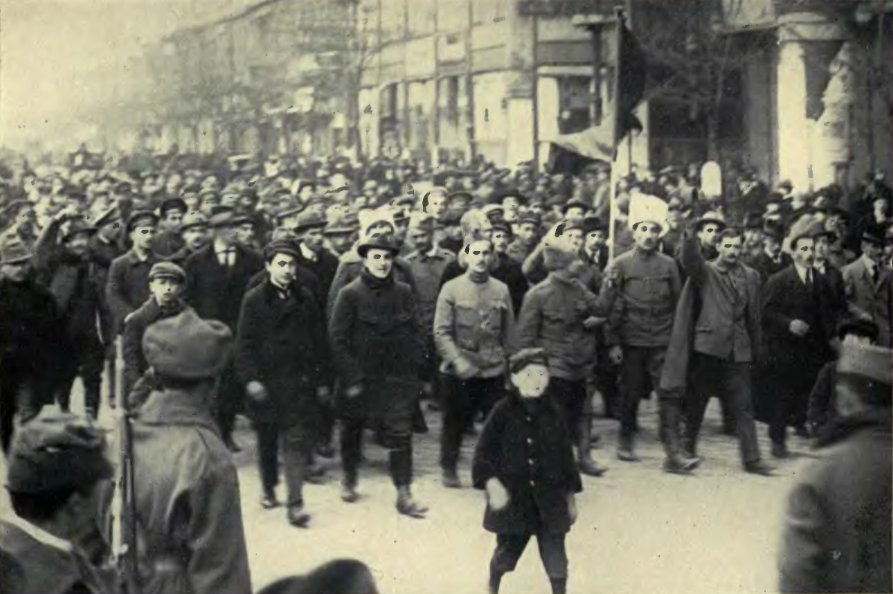
The Aster Revolution brought Mihály Károlyi to the helm of Hungary.

Austria-Hungary signed the armistice of Villa Giusti with Italy on 3 November. The same day Bojović informed the Serbian Supreme Command that lieutenant colonels Koszlovány and Dormanti, attached to the Hungarian general staff, had reached the Dunav Division's headquarters on authority of Generalfeldmarschall Hermann Kövess von Kövessháza, with offers of an armistice. This information was then forwarded to d'Espèrey, who provided the Chief-of-staff of the Serbian Supreme Command, vojvoda Živojin Mišić, with a list of six conditions to be demanded from Hungary before any negotiations could commence. They included the disarmament and withdrawal of Hungarian forces from a zone extending 15 kilometres (9.3 miles) from the pre-war Serbian and Romanian borders, the surrender of all vessels on the Danube, Sava, and Drina rivers and in the Adriatic Sea, and the supply of a delegate authorised to discuss the terms of the armistice. Mišić replied to d'Espèrey with a demand that Austro-Hungarian forces should evacuate from all territories reserved for a future South Slavic state, and requested that the Serbian Army be allowed to occupy the Banat and Bačka regions up to the Mureș–Baja–Subotica–Pécs line. He noted that Serbia had been promised these areas following the 1915 Treaty of London.

In view of this development, Mišić directed Bojović to continue advancing north to capture Banat south of the Mureș River, and west of the line about 10 kilometres (6.2 miles) east of Bela Crkva, Vršac, and Timișoara. He also instructed Bojović to capture Bačka south of the Baja–Subotica line. Both the First and the Second armies were instructed in less precise terms to advance west to Syrmia, Slavonia, Croatia, Bosnia, Herzegovina, and Dalmatia; Serbian troops started heading towards these regions on 5 November. The same day, d'Espèrey learned of the armistice of Villa Giusti and sent a telegram to Paris asking if he should continue negotiations or simply apply the terms of the existing agreement to his area of responsibility.

== Negotiations ==
=== Károlyi–d'Espèrey talks ===
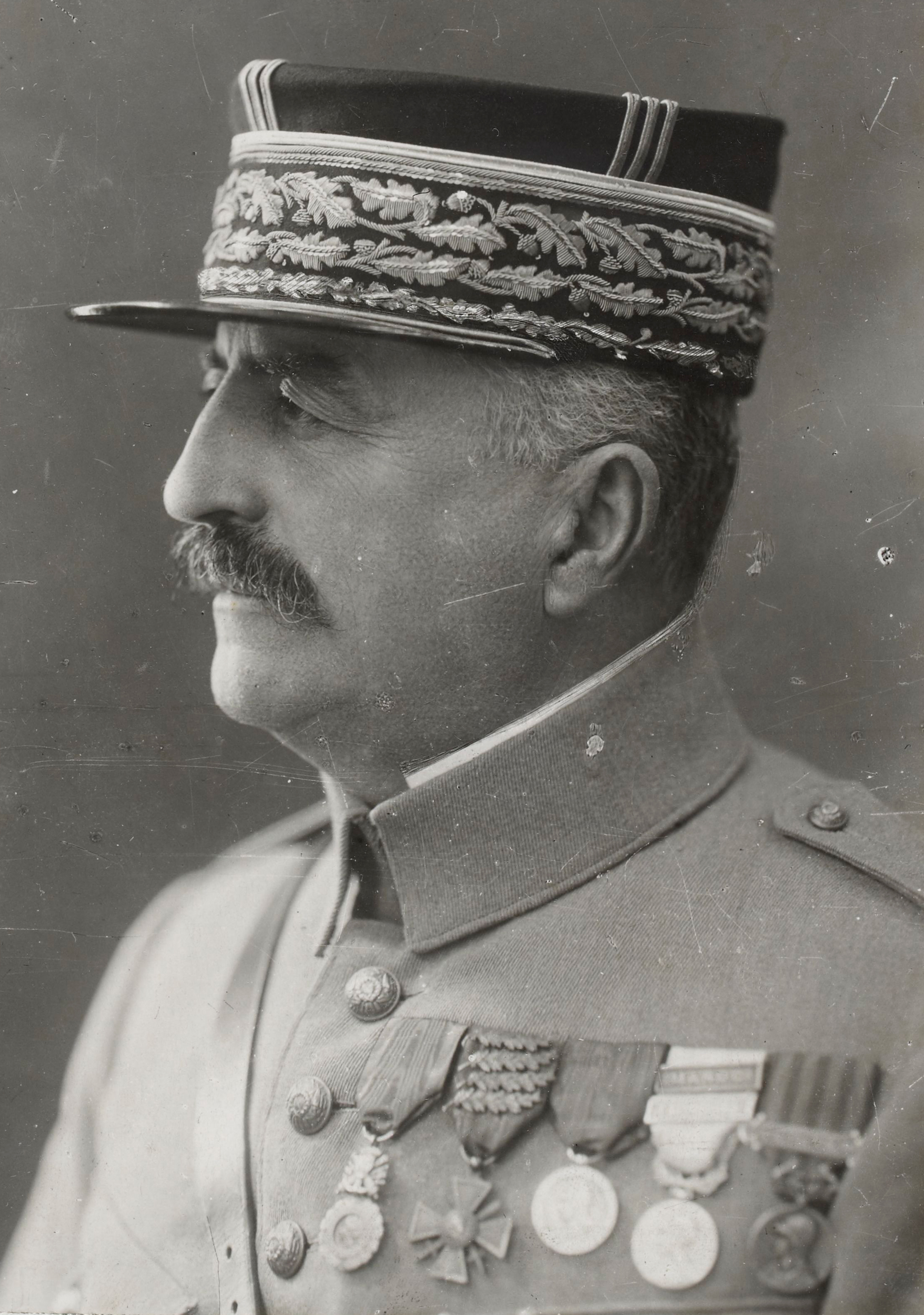
General Louis Franchet d'Espèrey negotiated the armistice of Belgrade on behalf of the Allies.

On 6 November, Károlyi led a delegation consisting of the Minister for Nationalities, Oszkár Jászi, Hungarian National Council representative Ferenc Hatvany, Workers' and Soldiers' councils representatives Dezső Bokányi and Imre Csernyák, and Prime Minister's office secretary Bakony. They were accompanied by 12 journalists from Budapest – travelling by train to Subotica and then to Novi Sad, where they boarded the SS Millenium, which took them to Belgrade. The group also included a French interpreter. Károlyi hoped to save as much of the former Lands of the Crown of Saint Stephen as possible. He hoped the Triple Entente would by sympathetic to his government on account of his wartime declarations against the war and alliance with Germany – and perceive Hungary as a neutral, friendly nation.

The day when the Hungarian delegates arrived, d'Espèrey received orders to continue negotiations while applying provisions of the armistice of Villa Giusti. He went to Niš, where he had talks with Mišić and Regent Alexander regarding the upcoming talks with Károlyi, with a particular emphasis placed on the demarcation line.

On 7 November, d'Espèrey arrived in Belgrade accompanied by the chief operating officer of the Serbian Supreme Command, Colonel Danilo Kalafatović. D'Espèrey summoned Károlyi and the rest of the delegation to his residence at 7:00 p.m. to start negotiations. While the two were travelling to Belgrade, a telegram was sent from Paris to d'Espèrey instructing him to discuss only the implementation of the armistice of Villa Giusti and to forego any discussion of political matters. This message was forwarded to Belgrade via Thessaloniki, Skopje and Niš where it was intercepted by the assistant Chief of Staff of the Serbian Supreme Command, Colonel Petar Pešić. He forwarded the telegram to Kalafatović along with a separate telegram from Mišić asking Kalafatović not to hand the message to d'Espèrey until after the negotiations were completed. Pešić later sent another telegram to Kalafatović instructing him to tell d'Espèrey that in case he had agreed to a demarcation line further south than the Timișoara–Sombor line, Serbia would continue the war against Hungary alone. Kalafatović never showed d'Espèrey the last telegram because the line agreed between him and Alexander in Niš was ultimately included in the terms.

Károlyi offered to agree to a cessation of hostilities and to implement a neutral foreign policy. D'Espèrey presented him with 18 conditions for the armistice, explaining that he considered Hungary a defeated power. Károlyi stated he could not accept d'Espèrey's terms and expect not to be executed upon returning to Budapest. He asked permission to send a telegram to French Prime Minister Georges Clemenceau, which was reluctantly granted by d'Espèrey. In the message, Károlyi explained he could only accept the terms of the armistice if the territorial integrity of Hungary was preserved – except in terms of Croatia-Slavonia, which he was willing to relinquish. At 10:30 p.m., the meeting was suspended for dinner and resumed for another 90 minutes at midnight. Károlyi then returned to Budapest, leaving two members of the delegation in Belgrade to await Clemenceau's reply.

=== Approval and signing of the agreement ===
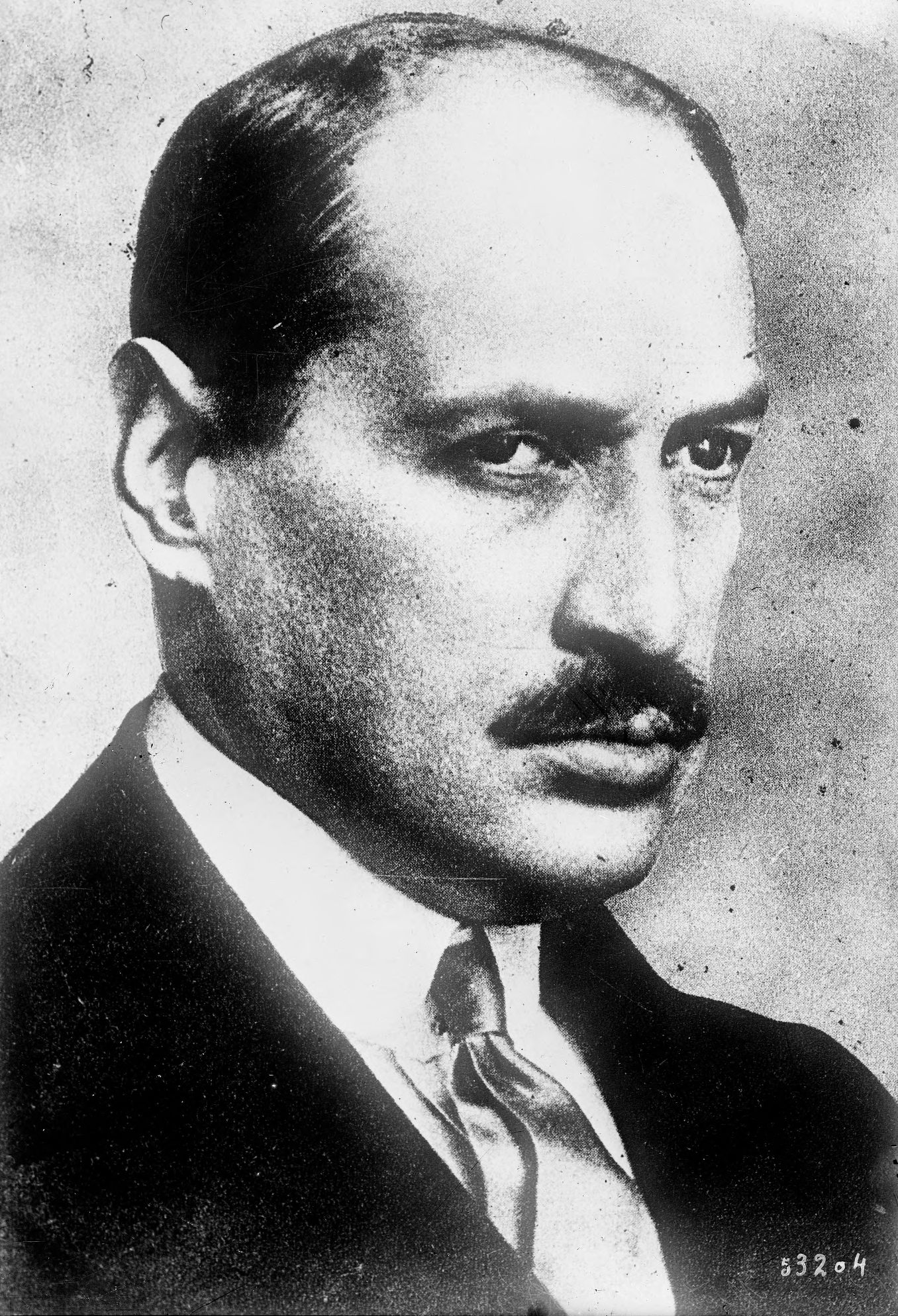
Mihály Károlyi negotiated the armistice on behalf of Hungary.

Károlyi reported on the negotiations at a cabinet meeting on 8 November, noting the amount of horses and rolling stock demanded by the Allies for transportation. He also reported that the administration of the country (including south of the demarcation line) would be left to Hungary. The cabinet decided to wait for Clemenceau to reply before acting any further. That day, the Serbian Drina Division was tasked with occupying Syrmia and a part of Slavonia east of the Brod–Osijek–Pécs line.

Clemenceau's reply to Károlyi's messages arrived in Belgrade on 9 November. D'Espèrey was instructed to discuss military matters only and leave the political matters to others. He then left Kalafatović to forward the message to the remaining Hungarian delegates. The two returned to Budapest the night of 9–10 November, and d'Espèrey left to Niš for a conference with Mišić and Henrys before proceeding to Thessaloniki. On 9 November, a unit of former prisoners of war led by Serbian Army Major Vojislav Bugarski captured Novi Sad unopposed, and a different unit captured Vršac the following day.

In Thessaloniki, d'Espèrey urged the Romanian government to enter the war on the side of the Allies which they did – ordering mobilisation and commencing hostilities on 10 November. On 11 November, Bugarski forwarded Kalafatović a message he was given by a Hungarian officer stating that the Hungarian National Council had accepted Clemenceau's terms and that Minister of War Béla Linder was arriving that day to Belgrade to sign the agreement. The message was then relayed to d'Espèrey in Thessaloniki. He authorised Henrys to sign the agreement as revised by Clemenceau on behalf of the Allies, together with Mišić.

After learning of the armistice of 11 November 1918 and that it applied to Hungary as well, Mišić again instructed Bojović to advance as far east in Banat as possible towards the Orșova–Lugoj– Timișoara line regardless of the presence of any Allied forces there. The armistice signatories met in the building of the State Direction of Funds in Belgrade at 9:00 p.m. on 13 November. No further changes were discussed regarding the text, except the time of cessation of hostilities. Originally, the draft stipulated a time 24 hours after the signing of the agreement, but Linder insisted that hostilities had already ceased. Henrys accepted his view and Mišić then complied as well. The agreement was signed by Mišić, Henrys, and Linder at 11:15 p.m.

== Terms ==
The demarcation line (marked in solid red) under the armistice of Belgrade. Most Hungarian forces were to withdraw north of the line. The dashed and dotted lines represent Czechoslovak and Vix Note demands, respectively.

The signed agreement consisted of 18 points. The first specified the demarcation line running along the upper course of the Someș before turning to Bistrița, then south to the Mureș River and along its course to confluence with the Tisza from where it proceeded west to Subotica, Baja, and Pécs before reaching the Drava and the border with Croatia-Slavonia. It stipulated that the Allies would occupy the territory south and east of the line, with Hungarian police and gendarmerie units remaining in numbers sufficient to maintain public order and some army units being used to guard railways. The ninth point required the surrender of weapons and other materiel at places designated by the Allies for potential use by units they may establish. The tenth called for the immediate release of Allied prisoners of war and the continued captivity of Hungarian prisoners of war.

The second point limited the size of the Hungarian Armed Forces to six infantry and two cavalry divisions. The third point allowed the Allies to occupy any location in Hungary and use all means of transport for military purposes. Under the eleventh and the sixteenth points, German troops present on Hungarian soil were given until 18 November to depart. Hungary would void all commitments to Germany and forbid the transportation of troops and arms and prevent any military telegraphic communications with Germany. The fourteenth point placed all post and telegraph offices under Allied control. Furthermore, under the seventh point, Hungary was required to provide a detachment of telegraphists and material required to repair postal and telegraph service in Serbia.

Points four through six and eight determined the number of horses, rolling stock, ships, tugboats, and barges to be placed at the disposal of the Allied commander in Thessaloniki or as indemnity for Serbian war losses, as well as the supply of railway personnel for the same. The same provisions required the surrender of all river monitors. Point thirteen required Hungary to inform the Allies of the location of mines in the Danube and the Black Sea and to clear them from Hungarian waterways.

The twelfth point required that Hungary contribute to the maintenance of the Allied occupation forces, allowing requisitioning at market prices. Under the fifteenth point, an Allied representative was to be attached to the Hungarian Ministry of Food to protect Allied interests. Concurrently, under the seventeenth point, the Allies vowed not to interfere with the internal administration of Hungary. The final point stated that hostilities between Hungary and the Allies had ceased.

== Aftermath ==
=== Departures from the agreement ===
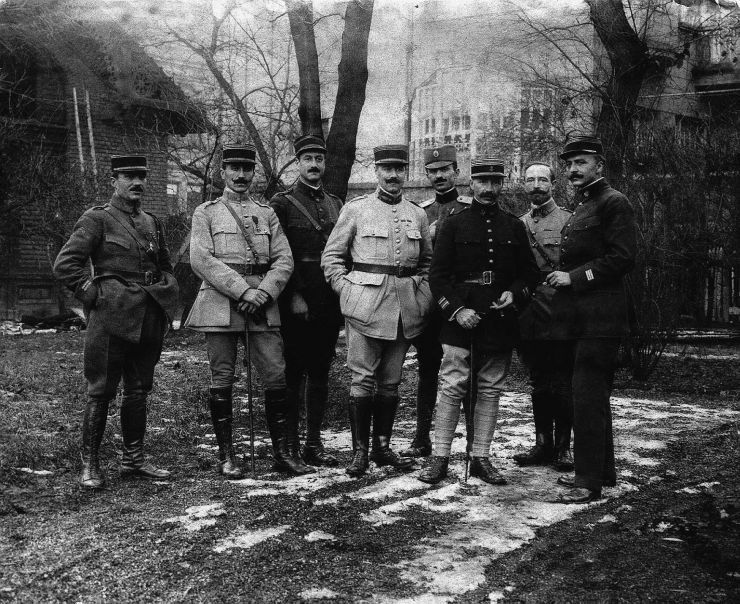
French military mission in Budapest; Brevet Lieutenant Colonel Fernand Vix is third from right

Charles I abdicated on 13 November, and days later, the First Hungarian Republic was proclaimed with Károlyi still at the helm. Henrys set up a French military mission to supervise the implementation of the armistice and deployed it to Budapest. It was led by Brevet Lieutenant Colonel Fernand Vix otherwise assigned to Henrys's staff. It consisted of twelve officers and forty-five enlisted men who arrived at Budapest on 26 November. In addition to the implementation of the agreement, Vix was tasked with gathering intelligence on economic and military matters. Within 24 hours, Vix was sent orders to obtain Hungarian withdrawal from areas of present-day Slovakia, in violation of the armistice of Belgrade, to enforce a claim by Czechoslovakia directed through French Foreign Minister Stephen Pichon. The Serbian Army occupied Subotica on the day of the armistice, but proceeded to capture Pécs the following day, as well as Timișoara, Orșova, and Lugoj on 15 November. It went on to occupy Sombor and Senta on 16 November, and the part of Arad on the south bank of the Mureș on 21 November. The Serbian Army thereby completed the occupation of Banat, thus abolishing the Banat Republic which had been proclaimed only days earlier. In early December, the commander of the French forces in Romania, General Henri Mathias Berthelot, informed Vix that Romanian troops would advance to the Satu Mare–Carei–Oradea–Békéscsaba line on the pretext of the protection of the Romanian population in the area of Cluj, and then ordered Vix to obtain Hungary's withdrawal from the city of Cluj itself. Vix complained about the conflict of authority to Henrys and d'Espèrey as he was also receiving instructions from Berthelot and the Czechoslovak envoy to Hungary, Milan Hodža. Vix ultimately told Henrys that the armistice of Belgrade was worthless.

On 25 November, only days after the signing of the armistice, the Great People's Assembly of Serbs, Bunjevci and other Slavs in Banat, Bačka and Baranja was convened in Novi Sad to proclaim the unification of these regions with Serbia. The State of Slovenes, Croats and Serbs moved to seize Međimurje – a region predominantly inhabited by Croats located just north of the demarcation line. The first attempt to occupy Međimurje in mid-November failed, but a second incursion by the Royal Croatian Home Guard resulted in the region's occupation on behalf of the newly established Kingdom of Serbs, Croats and Slovenes on 24 December 1918.

According to Jászi, before the armistice, the Hungarian public believed that the Allies would somehow reward Károlyi's pacifist pronouncements. Given that much hope had been placed in the principles of Wilsonianism, the terms of the armistice led to widespread disillusionment. D'Espèrey was perceived as malicious, menacing, and ignorant. Many Hungarians grew bitter, not only because they found the terms of the armistice unjust, but also due to the real and perceived breaches of those terms. The number of discontent people grew further with the return of demobilised Hungarian troops, released prisoners of war and refugees from the occupied territories. The Károlyi government lost further support as it instituted a policy of land reform – criticised as too radical by landowners and as half-hearted by others. Dissatisfied conservatives grouped around Károlyi's brother Gyula, whereas dissatisfied former officers were led by Gyula Gömbös. The leader of the Communist Party of Hungary, Béla Kun, appealed to the proletariat.

=== Hungarian Soviet Republic ===
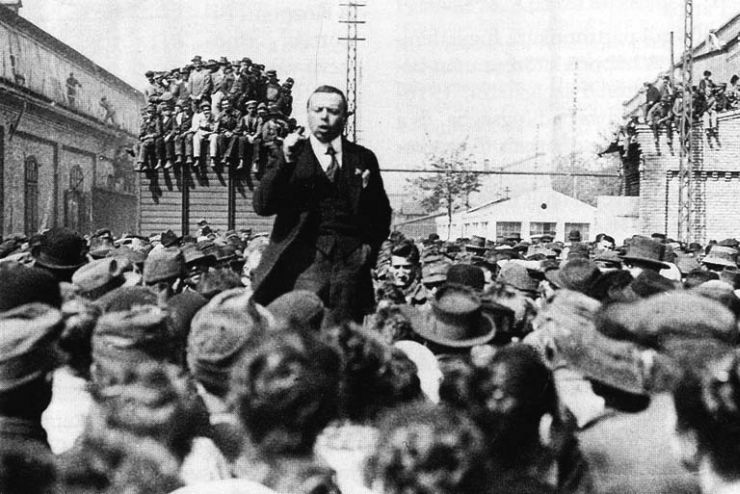
Hungarian communist leader Béla Kun speaking in 1919

In order to address increasingly frequent skirmishes along the Hungarian–Romanian line of control, the Paris Peace Conference decided on 26 February 1919 to allow Romanian troops in an area 25 kilometres (16 miles) beyond the demarcation line established by the armistice of Belgrade, and set up an additional neutral zone to be occupied by Allied forces other than Romanians. This established the "temporary frontier" along the Arad–Carei–Satu Mare line. Vix was tasked with presenting the demand to the Hungarian authorities, along with the request that their withdrawal must start on 23 March and be completed within ten days. On 20 March 1919, Hungary was presented with the demand that became known as the Vix Note. In response, Károlyi resigned, and a revolutionary council established by the Social Democratic Party and the Communist Party assumed power. The council abolished the First Hungarian Republic, replacing it with the Hungarian Soviet Republic. In the summer of 1919, Soviet Hungary fought a war against Czechoslovakia and a war against Romania, resulting in the downfall of the communist regime and the Romanian capture of Budapest on 4 August. France urged the Army of the Kingdom of Serbs, Croats and Slovenes to move against the Hungarian Soviet Republic by advancing north from Bačka, but no such military intervention ever took place. In June 1919, Banat was partitioned by the Allies against Romanian complaints that this was contrary to the promise of the entire region being awarded to Romania under the Treaty of Bucharest. By December, the Romanians gave way to diplomatic pressure and agreed to the Kingdom of Serbs, Croats and Slovenes receiving the western part of Banat.

On 12 August, the armed forces of the Kingdom of Serbs, Croats and Slovenes occupied Prekmurje. The move had been authorised by the Paris Peace Conference a month earlier as compensation for the kingdom's contribution to the suppression of the Hungarian Soviet Republic. A short-lived republic was proclaimed in Prekmurje in late May, but was suppressed by Hungarian troops in early June.

On 4 June 1920, the Paris Peace Conference produced the Treaty of Trianon as the peace agreement between the Allies and Hungary. Territorial changes under the treaty awarded Transylvania, Crișana, the southern part of Maramureș and the eastern part of Banat to Romania – exceeding the armistice of Belgrade demarcation line in Romania's favour. The Kingdom of Serbs, Croats and Slovenes formally received Bačka, the western part of Banat, and the southern part of Baranya – a territory similar to the one specified in the armistice of Belgrade. A Yugoslav-Hungarian Boundary Commission was tasked with defining a definitive delimitation between the two states. From those territories, as well as those lost to Czechoslovakia and Austria, 350,000–400,000 refugees left or fled to Hungary, where subsequently, according to Hungarian author Paul Lendvai, they became receptive to extremist and populist views.

== Sources ==
- Ablovatski, Eliza (2021). Revolution and Political Violence in Central Europe: The Deluge of 1919. Cambridge: Cambridge University Press. ISBN 978-0-521-76830-6.
- Beneš, Jakub S. (2017). "The Green Cadres and the Collapse of Austria-Hungary in 1918". Past & Present (236). Oxford: Oxford University Press: 207–241. doi:10.1093/pastj/gtx028. ISSN 0031-2746.
- Grenville, John (2001). The Major International Treaties of the Twentieth Century: A History and Guide with Texts. Vol. 1. Abingdon-on-Thames: Taylor & Francis. ISBN 978-0-415-23798-7.
- Biagini, A.; Motta, G. (2014). Empires and Nations from the Eighteenth to the Twentieth Century: Volume 2. EBL-Schweitzer. Newcastle upon Tyne: Cambridge Scholars Publishing. ISBN 978-1-4438-6542-5.
- Darques, Régis (2017). Mapping Versatile Boundaries: Understanding the Balkans. London: Springer Nature. ISBN 978-3-319-40925-2.
- Gyorgy, Andrew (1947). "Postwar Hungary". The Review of Politics. 9 (3). Cambridge: Cambridge University Press: 297–321. doi:10.1017/S0034670500038699. ISSN 0034-6705. JSTOR 1404017. S2CID 251373659.
- Kosi, Jernej (2020). "Summer of 1919". The Hungarian Historical Review. 9 (1). Budapest: Institute of History, Research Centre for the Humanities, Hungarian Academy of Sciences: 51–68. ISSN 2063-8647. JSTOR 26984101.
- Krizman, Bogdan (1970). "The Belgrade Armistice of 13 November 1918". The Slavonic and East European Review. 48 (110). London: UCL School of Slavonic and East European Studies: 67–87. ISSN 0037-6795. JSTOR 4206164.
- Lampe, John R. (2000). Yugoslavia as History: Twice There Was a Country (2nd ed.). Cambridge: Cambridge University Press. ISBN 0-521-77357-1.
- Lendvai, Paul (2003). The Hungarians: A Thousand Years of Victory in Defeat. Princeton: Princeton University Press. ISBN 978-0-691-11969-4.
- Morrison, Kenneth (2018). Nationalism, Identity and Statehood in Post-Yugoslav Montenegro. London: Bloomsbury Academic. ISBN 978-1-4742-3518-1.
- Pastor, Peter (1970). "The Vix Mission in Hungary, 1918-1919: A Re-Examination". Slavic Review. 29 (3). Cambridge: Cambridge University Press: 481–498. doi:10.2307/2493161. ISSN 0037-6779. JSTOR 2493161. S2CID 155147655.
- Ramet, Sabrina P. (2006). The Three Yugoslavias: State-Building and Legitimation, 1918–2005. Bloomington: Indiana University Press. ISBN 978-0-253-34656-8.
- Tucker, Spencer C. (1998). The Great War, 1914-18. London: UCL Press. ISBN 1-85728-390-2.
- Vuk, Ivan (2019). "Pripojenje Međimurja Kraljevstvu Srba, Hrvata i Slovenaca: Od neuspjeloga pokušaja 13. studenog do uspješnoga zaposjedanja Međimurja 24. prosinca 1918. godine" [The Annexation of Međimurje to the Kingdom of Serbs, Croats and Slovenes: From the unsuccessful attempt on 13 November to the successful occupation of Međimurje on 24 December 1918]. Časopis za suvremenu povijest (in Croatian). 51 (2). Zagreb: Croatian Institute of History: 507–532. doi:10.22586/csp.v51i2.8927. ISSN 0590-9597. S2CID 204456373.
