= Sándor Juhász Nagy =

Hungarian politician

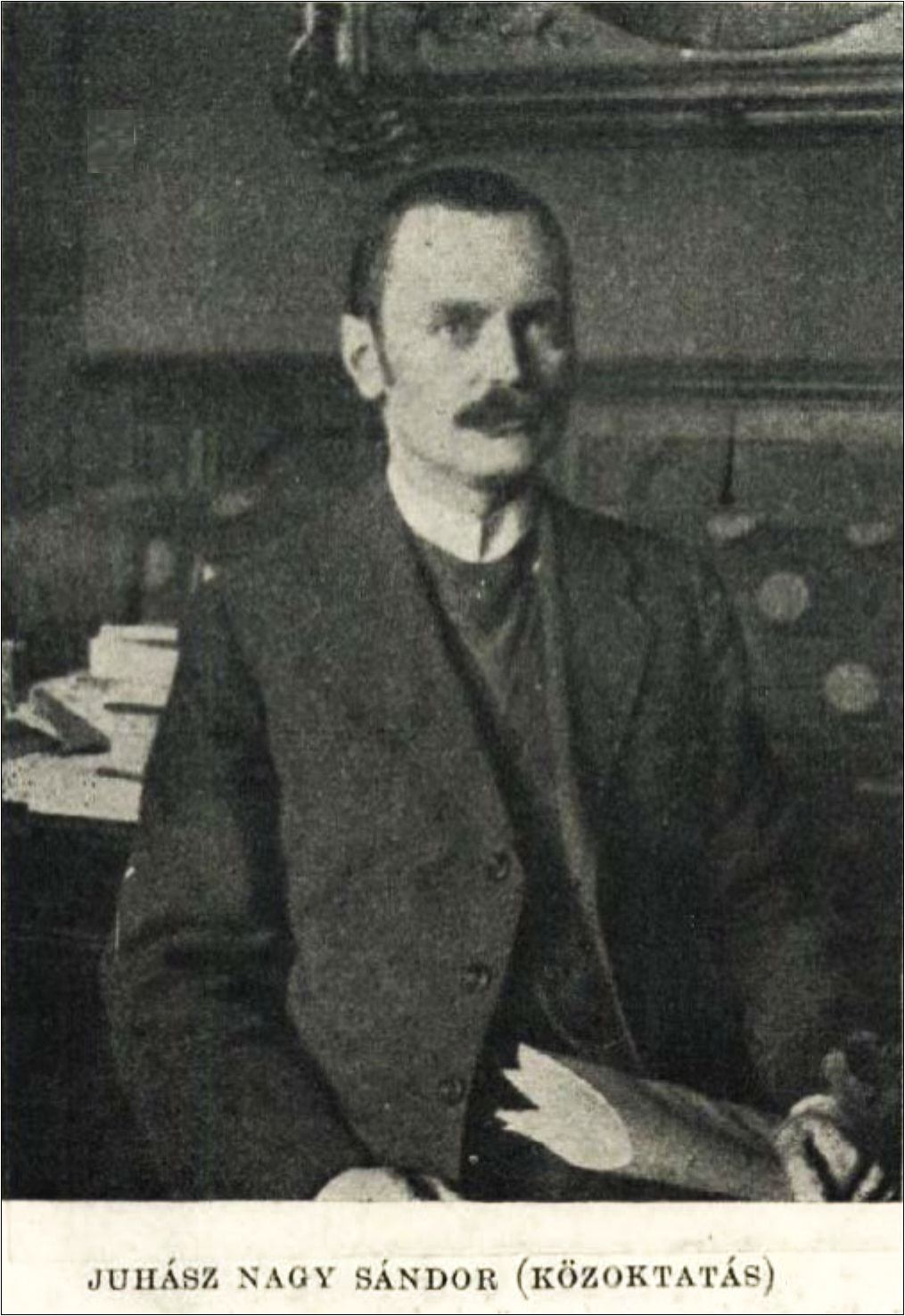

Minister of Religion and Education of Hungary
- In office 22 December 1918 – 22 January 1919
- Preceded by: Márton Lovászy
- Succeeded by: János Vass (Minister of Religion); Zsigmond Kunfi (Minister of Education)

Personal details
- Born: Sándor Nagy; 13 October 1883 Kaba, Austria-Hungary
- Died: 10 May 1946 (aged 62) Debrecen, Second Hungarian Republic
- Party: Independence Party
- Profession: Politician, jurist

Sándor Juhász Nagy (13 October 1883 – 10 May 1946) was a Hungarian politician, who served as State Secretary of Religion and Education between 1918 and 1919 with ministerial competence. He finished his law studies in Debrecen, Kolozsvár and Budapest. He worked as a lawyer in Debrecen from 1910. He was member of the National Assembly of Hungary between 1917 and 1919. He supported Mihály Károlyi, joined the Károly Party, after the Independence Party was collapsed to two parts. Dénes Berinkey appointed him Minister of Justice on 25 January 1919.

After the establishment of the Hungarian Soviet Republic he retired from the politics and lived in Debrecen. Later he immigrated to Vienna, and only returned to Hungary in 1923. From the 1930s he participated in the oppositional liberal movements. Later he supported the politics of Endre Bajcsy-Zsilinszky. During the Operation Margarethe (19 March 1944) he was arrested by the Nazis for some days. He served as Deputy Speaker of the Interim National Assembly between 21 December 1944 and 5 September 1945. He was member of the assembly from 4 November 1945.

== Works ==
- A magyar októberi forradalom története (History of the Hungarian October Revolution) – 1945, book about the Aster Revolution.

Political offices
Preceded by Márton Lovászy	Minister of Religion and Education; 1918–1919	Succeeded by János Vass; Religion
Preceded by Márton Lovászy	Minister of Religion and Education; 1918–1919	Succeeded by Zsigmond Kunfi; Education
Preceded by Dénes Berinkey	Minister of Justice; 1919	Succeeded by István Ládai
