= János Vass =

Hungarian politician

Minister of Religion of Hungary
- In office 22 January 1919 – 21 March 1919
- Prime Minister: Dénes Berinkey
- Preceded by: Sándor Juhász Nagy (Minister of Religion and Education)
- Succeeded by: post abolished

Personal details
- Born: 4 May 1873 Eger, Austria-Hungary
- Died: 19 April 1936 (aged 62) Budapest, Kingdom of Hungary
- Party: Catholic People's Party
- Profession: politician, jurist

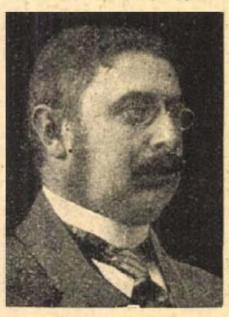
János Vass in 1917

János Vass (4 May 1873 – 19 April 1936) was a Hungarian politician, who served as Minister of Religion in 1919. He organized the Council of Religion with participating of Jusztin Baranyay, Sándor Giesswein, Ákos Timon, Béla Turi and Miklós Zborai.

Political offices
Preceded by Sándor Juhász Nagy	Minister of Religion; 1919	Succeeded by post abolished
