= Géza Lukachich von Somorja =

Austrian military officer and nobleman

Feldmarschalleutnant Baron Géza Lukachich von Somorja
- Somorjai Lukachich Géza Ákos Dezső
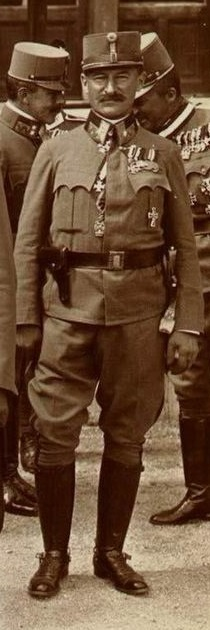
- Born: Géza Ákos Dezső Lukachich; 29 March 1865; Kassa, Kingdom of Hungary, Austrian Empire
- Died: 25 December 1943 (aged 78); Budapest, Kingdom of Hungary
- Occupation: Feldmarschalleutnant of the Austrian army
- Awards: Officer's Gold Knight's Cross, Order of Maria Theresia

Baron Géza Lukachich von Somorja (29 March 1865 – 25 December 1943) was an Austro-Hungarian military officer and nobleman. He was a lieutenant general in the Austro-Hungarian Army during World War I. Lukacich von Somorja graduated from a military school in Temesvár and upon graduation, he joined an infantry regiment. He progressed through the ranks to Chief of Staff, and later taught at the Maria Theresa Military Academy. During World War I, he fought in Serbia and on the Italian front. For his service he was invested in the Order of Maria Theresa, received a baronial title and the rank of Feldmarschalleutnant. After the war, he commanded troops garrisoned in Budapest, but was unable to suppress the Aster Revolution. Later in his life, he founded an association of retired military officers, which he led for the rest of his life.

== Biography ==
=== Early life ===
Géza Ákos Dezső Lukachich de Somorja was born on 29 March 1865 in Kassa (present-day Košice, Slovakia). At the age of 22 Géza graduated from a military school for cadets in Temesvár (today Timișoara, Romania). After finishing military school, in 1883, he would join the 62nd Infantry Regiment. Eventually serving on the General Staff, and as Chief of Staff of the first military district of Budapest. He would later teach at the Maria Theresa Military Academy and the Honvéd Ministry. On 20 July 1911 he was promoted to Oberst, in December he became a commander of the 38th Infantry Regiment. Which was stationed near Budapest. In 1914 he became the commander of the 1st Mountain Brigade.

=== World War I ===
Lukachich distinguished himself as a competent officer during the Serbian campaign in World War I. On the Italian front of the war he fought at the Battle of Drina, Battle of Doberdò, Battle of Caporetto, and the Battles of the Isonzo. Géza was said to have fought valiantly while commanding the 20th Landwehr Division at the Eleventh Battle of the Isonzo. Earning him the Officer's Gold Knight's Medal. On 10 March 1915 he was promoted to major general. In November 1916 he was transferred to the Russian front. Later in the same year, he was selected to lead the 20th Landwehr Division, and returned to the Italian front in August 1917. On 17 August 1917, Lukachich von Somorja was awarded the Order of Maria Theresia, and with it the title of Baron of Somorja. During the early days of 1918, he was put in charge of many garrisons throughout Hungary and promoted to Feldmarschalleutnant on 9 March 1918.

=== Later life ===
After World War I, he was installed as the military commander of Budapest. While there, attempted to suppress the Aster Revolution, however his efforts failed. On 30 October 1918, he was arrested by the pro-revolutionary Hungarian National Council led by Mihály Károlyi. Following his release in 1919, he retired from the army and founded the National Association of Retired Military Officers. He would serve as the organization's president until his death. Géza Lukachich was also the president of the National Association of Homeowners. He died in the third district of Budapest at 4:00 a.m. on 25 December 1943.

== Family ==
Lukachich von Somorja was a descendant of the Lukachich family, a Hungarian noble family of Croatian origin. His parents were József Lukachich and Laura Szlexy. He married Erzsébet Gizella Halmos, with whom he had two daughters.

== Works ==
- Reasons for the Mutilation of Hungary (Budapest, 1932)
- Defending the Doberdo in the First Battle of Isonzo (Budapest, 1918, Athenaeum Publishing House)
