= Béla Linder =

Hungarian colonel of artillery and minister

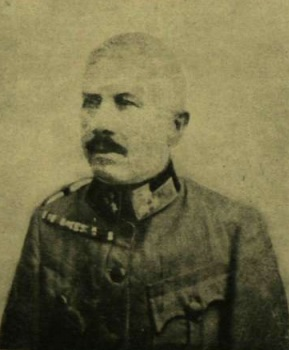
- Béla Linder in 1918
- Born: 10 February 1876; Majs, Austro-Hungarian Empire
- Died: 15 April 1962 (aged 86); Belgrade, SFR Yugoslavia
- Military career
- Allegiance: Austria-Hungary; Hungarian Democratic Republic; Hungarian Soviet Republic; Serbian-Hungarian Baranya-Baja Republic
- Conflicts: World War I

Béla Linder's pacifist speech for military officers, and declaration of disarmament on 2 November 1918.

Béla Linder (10 February 1876 – 15 April 1962), Hungarian colonel of artillery, Secretary of War of Mihály Károlyi government, minister without portfolio of Dénes Berinkey government, military attaché of Hungarian Soviet Republic based in Vienna, finally the mayor of Pécs during the period of Serb occupation.

== Secretary of War for nine days ==
Linder was born in Majs, at the time in Austria-Hungary. The father of Béla Linder was of Jewish origin, and was "part of the inner circle of Franz Ferdinand, and when the heir to the throne was assassinated, Linder was (…) kicked out of the military leadership staff". Presumably after this incident he was actively looking for contact with people who were seeking change.

In 1918, during the so-called "Aster Revolution" his career suddenly rocketed from colonel status to Secretary of War on 31 October 1918. He swore to the government of Mihály Károlyi in front of the Hungarian Parliament on 2 November 1918.

During the swearing-in ceremony (wearing a red tie) he spoke the infamous words: "[T]raditions of a thousand years and slavery of a thousand years had to be demolished. Five years of war were needed, thousands and thousands of deaths were needed so that a new victorious life could emerge from it. This new victorious life is born under pacifism. (…) No need for armies anymore! I do not want to see any soldiers anymore! (…) Make an oath that you will bring up your children in such a way that the possibility of war is shut out!"

The Hungarian Royal Honvéd army still had more than 1.400.000 soldiers when Mihály Károlyi was announced as prime minister of Hungary. Károlyi yielded to U.S. President Woodrow Wilson's demand for pacifism by ordering the unilateral self-disarmament of the Hungarian army. This occurred under Linder's direction as minister of war in the Károlyi government. Due to the full disarmament of its army, Hungary was to remain without a national defence at a time of particular vulnerability.

Military and political events drastically and rapidly changed after the Hungarian disarmament. On 5 November 1918, the Serbian army, with the help of the French army, crossed southern borders. On 8 November, the Czechoslovak Army crossed the northern borders, and on 13 November, the Romanian army crossed the eastern borders of the Kingdom of Hungary. On 13 November, Károlyi signed an armistice with the Allied nations in Belgrade. It limited the size of the Hungarian army to six infantry and two cavalry divisions. Demarcation lines defining the territory to remain under Hungarian control were made.

The lines would apply until definitive borders could be established. Under the terms of the armistice, Serbian and French troops advanced from the south, taking control of the Banat and Croatia. Czechoslovakia took control of Upper Hungary and Carpathian Ruthenia. Romanian forces were permitted to advance to the River Maros (Mureș) . However, on 14 November, Serbia occupied Pécs.

Referring to the negotiations with the Entente Cordiale, the Ministry of Military led by Linder sent a telegraph to the Foreign Office on 6 November 1918 to order the German troops onto the banks of Danube and Sava, which they refused.

Later the complete honvéds of the ex-Austrian-Hungarian army were asked to return and to hand over all weapons. This led to Hungary being totally defenseless.

During the rule of Károlyi's pacifist cabinet, Hungary lost the control over approx. 75% of its former pre-WW1 territories (325 411 km^{2}) without fight and was subject to foreign occupation.

== Minister without portfolio ==
Criticised for his dilettantism, he resigned as Secretary of War on 9 November, but he kept his membership in the government. His task was to lead the negotiations for the preparations of the peace treaty.

On 7 November there were already negotiations in Belgrade between the delegation led by Mihály Károlyi and the commander of eastern Entente troops, general Franchet d'Esperey. On 13 November, Linder signed the Armistice of Belgrade together with General Henrys (commander of French Eastern Army) and voivode Živojin Mišić (commander general of the Serb army).

During the period of the Hungarian Soviet Republic, he was engaged in numerous diplomatic moves as the military attaché of the Ministry of Military in Vienna (2 May – 5 August 1919).

== Establishment of Serbian–Hungarian Baranya–Baja Republic, fleeing abroad ==
After the collapse of the Hungarian Soviet Republic, he joined the Socialist Party, and on 23 September 1920 he became the mayor of Pécs. At this time Pécs was still occupied by the Serb army, even though there was a valid border agreement with Entente.

Later he was the leader of the Pécs-Baranya Republic and on 14 August 1921 of the Baranya–Baja Serbian–Hungarian Republic. The latter republic was upheld for eight days, and its president was painter Petar Dobrović.

When the Serb troops left the Baranya region for Yugoslavia on 14 August 1921, Linder joined them.

== His remembrance ==
Linder lived in Yugoslavia till his death. The Kingdom of Serbs, Croats and Slovenes and Josip Broz Tito's Yugoslavia honoured him for his activities in the unilateral self-disarmament of the Hungarian WW1 Honvéd army and for his role in the foundation of the Baranya–Baja Serbian–Hungarian Republic between 1918 and 1919, and he received state funeral and an honorary tomb in Belgrade.

However, Hungarians condemn him as he had a significant part in the borders of the Republic of Hungary being set disadvantageously at the Treaty of Trianon and Hungary had no armies to counter the inordinate demands of the Little Entente.

Political offices
Preceded by Sándor Szurmay	Minister of War; 1918	Succeeded by Albert Bartha
