= Dénes Berinkey =

Hungarian jurist and politician

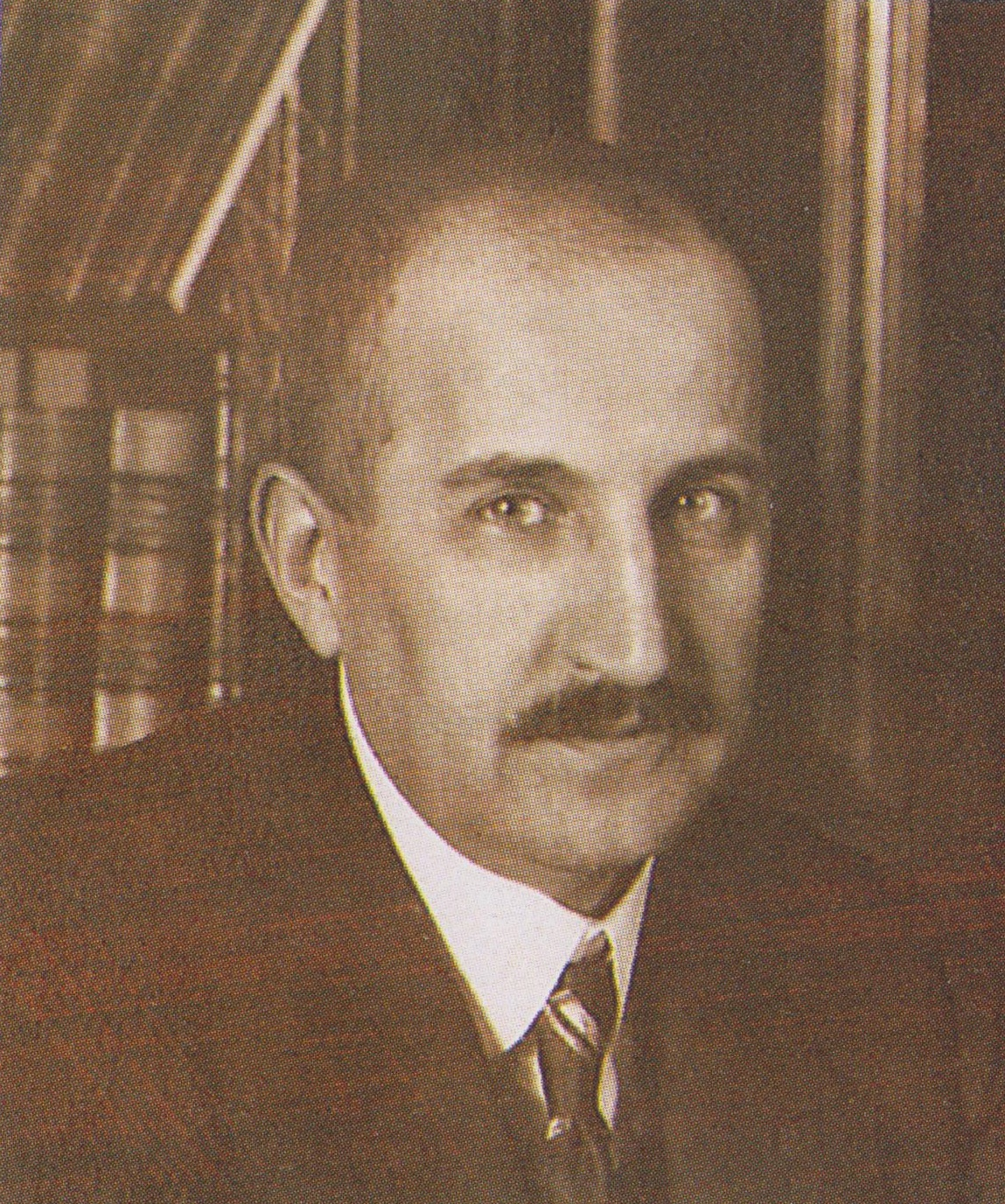

Prime Minister of Hungary
- In office 11 January 1919 – 21 March 1919
- President: Mihály Károlyi
- Preceded by: Mihály Károlyi
- Succeeded by: Sándor Garbai

Personal details
- Born: 17 October 1871 Csúz, Austria-Hungary (now Dubnik, Slovakia)
- Died: 25 June 1944 (aged 72) Budapest, Hungary
- Party: PRP (Civil Radical Party)
- Spouse: Erzsébet Szabó
- Children: Béla; Dénes; Győző

Dénes Berinkey (17 October 1871 – 25 June 1944) was a Hungarian jurist and politician who served as 21st Prime Minister of Hungary in the regime of Mihály Károlyi for two months in 1919.

On 20 March 1919, the French presented the Vix Note ordering Hungarian troops further back into Hungary; it was widely assumed that the military lines would be the new frontiers. Berinkey was unwilling to accept the note, as it would have endangered the country's territorial integrity. He was in no position to reject it, however, and he along with his cabinet resigned.

President Károlyi then announced that only the Social Democrats could form a new government. Unknown to Károlyi, the Social Democrats had merged with the Communists. When Károlyi turned over power to what he thought was a Social Democratic government, he was actually swearing in a Communist one. The new government promptly proclaimed the Hungarian Soviet Republic.

Political offices
Preceded by Barna Buza	Minister of Justice; 1918–1919	Succeeded by Sándor Juhász Nagy
Preceded by Mihály Károlyi	Prime Minister of Hungary; 1919	Succeeded by Sándor Garbai
Preceded by Mihály Károlyi	Minister of Foreign Affairs; Acting; 1919	Succeeded by Ferenc Harrer
