= Paul Lendvai =

Hungarian-born author and journalist (born 1929)

- Lendvai Pál
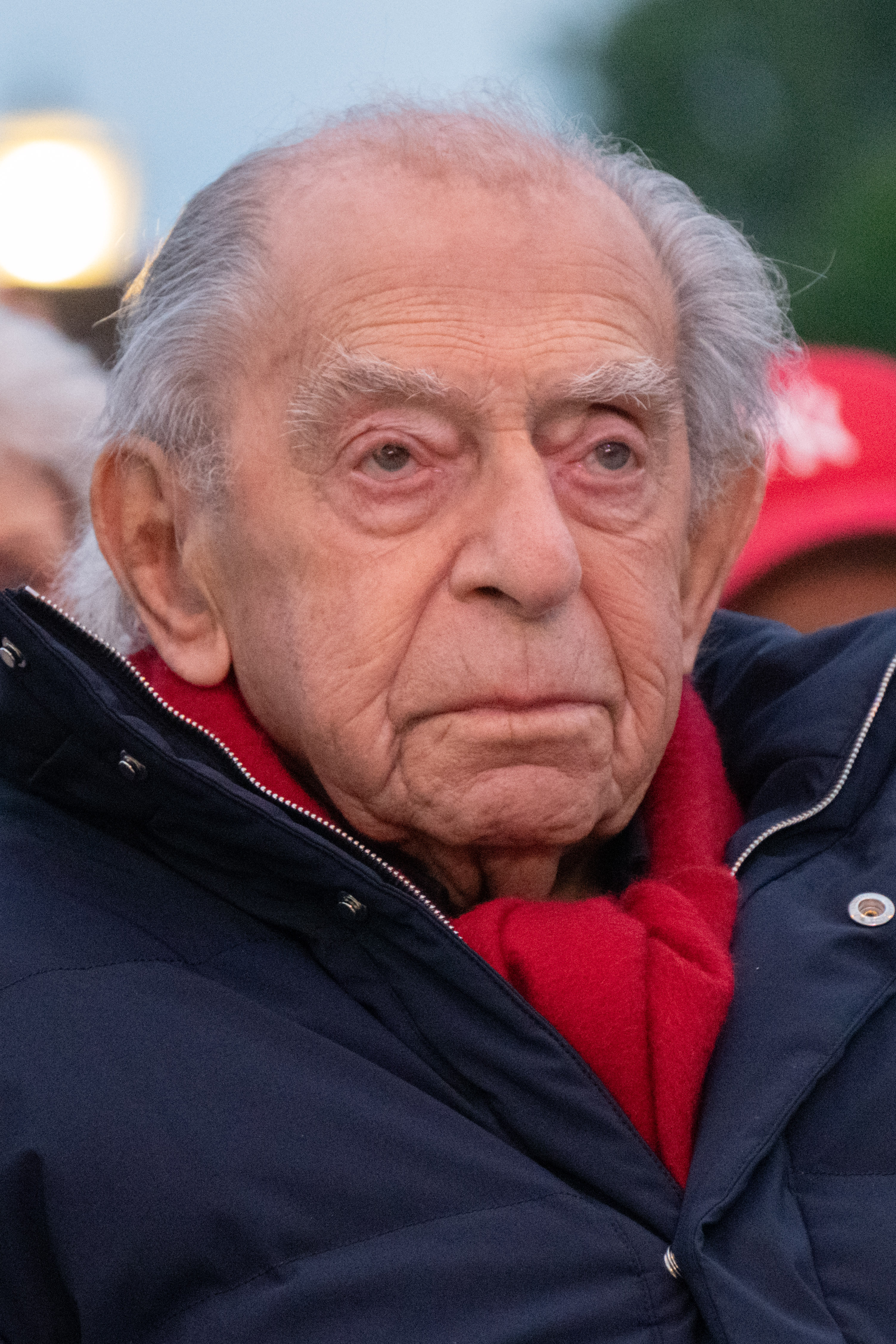
- Lendvai in 2025
- Born: 24 August 1929 (age 97); Budapest, Hungary
- Citizenship: Austrian (from 1959)
- Occupations: Writer; journalist
- Years active: c. 1940s–present
- Website: https://www.lendvai.at

Paul Lendvai (Hungarian: Lendvai Pál; born 24 August 1929) is a Hungarian-born Austrian author, journalist and political commentator who writes on topics such as Eastern Europe, communism, and antisemitism.

== Early life ==
Paul Lendvai was born in Budapest, Hungary on 24 August 1929, to Hungarian-Jewish parents. At the age of 15, he was arrested by the Nazis during the German occupation of Hungary, but survived with the help of a Swiss Schutzpass. Lendvai began his journalism career writing for social democratic newspapers in Hungary. Due to increasing political pressure following the Hungarian Revolution, he immigrated to Vienna, Austria, in 1957, where he continued his work.

== Career ==
=== Hungary ===
Lendvai worked as a journalist during Hungary's Rákosi era (1947–1956), writing for Szabad Nép and serving as chief of foreign reporting at the Hungarian news agency, Magyar Távirati Iroda (MTI).

In 1957, he immigrated to Vienna via Prague and Warsaw.

=== Austria ===
After arriving in Vienna, Lendvai wrote articles under aliases such as "György Holló", "Árpád Bécs", and "Paul Landy".

According to Lendvai, the aliases were a necessary survival measure to protect his parents from possible retaliation by the Hungarian state security services while he was publishing critical political journalism in the West. In his memoir he writes that guilt over leaving them behind made him "avoid anything that could cause them further difficulties. That’s why I was so intent on hiding behind pen names”.

He became a naturalised Austrian in 1959, and became a journalist specialising in Eastern European affairs. He served as the Eastern European correspondent for the daily Die Presse broadsheet and the Financial Times newspaper for twenty-two years.

Lendvai contributed to the British newspaper The Economist and wrote columns for Austrian, German, and Swiss newspapers and radio stations. In 1982, he became editor-in-chief of the Eastern Europe department at the ORF public broadcasting company, and in 1987, he became the director-general of Radio Österreich International. In 1985, the Hungarian communist leadership organized a Cultural Forum, inviting 900 politicians, writers, and other notable figures. Concurrently, a "counter-cultural forum" was planned, with expected participation from "dissidents and opposition groups", including György Konrád. Beginning in 2003, his weekly columns were published by the newspaper Der Standard. In 2010, a Hungarian pro-government newspaper accused Lendvai of collaborating with the communist regime by providing information about the counter-forum to the Hungarian authorities. Ferenc Gyurcsány, Hungary's former socialist prime minister, defended Lendvai, stating:

"As for me, I support him in his struggle to make a case for his decisions of yesteryear. [...] And we've got to stop digging up the past."

Hungarian novelist György Konrád, one of the intended speakers of the opposition event, expressed despondency over the allegations, stating, "If this was how things were, then it is very sad." Lendvai denied the accusations, attributing the campaign against him to his criticism of the current government in his latest book. Former conservative MP Debreczeni, philosopher Sandor Radnoti, and Austrian conservative leader Erhard Busek all defended his integrity. János Nagy, the ambassador with whom Lendvai had spoken at the time, was interviewed about the matter on Klubrádió and stated that his reports faithfully reflected their conversations.

On 19 March 2011, Lendvai presented the Hungarian translation of his book Mein verspieltes Land ("My squandered country") in Budapest. In his 1998 memoir, Blacklisted: A Journalist's Life in Central Europe, he discusses themes of ethnic hatred, political instability, and antisemitism in 20th-century Central Europe.

Lendvai was the founder, editor-in-chief, and co-publisher of Europäische Rundschau, a Vienna-based international quarterly published between 1973 and 2020. Austrian president, Heinz Fischer and former Czech foreign minister Karel Schwarzenberg delivered speeches at the review's 40th anniversary on 8 November 2013. Lendvai was appointed chairman of the independent migration council for Austria on 3 April 2014 by the Minister of the Interior.

== Secret police file ==
In the 1990s, Lendvai attempted to access his secret service file through a meeting with Socialist Prime Minister Gyula Horn but was unsuccessful in doing so. While honoured in the Hungarian Parliament, he reportedly commented, "I’d rather get my files than the award." The file, originally classified until 15 February 2042, was declassified under a 2003 law, along with other documents. In 2006, Lendvai requested and obtained his records from the Hungarian secret service archives, later describing their contents in an article for the literary weekly Élet és Irodalom (ÉS). In this article, he named several individuals assigned to his case.

According to Lendvai, the files totaled over 300 pages and identified him by the pseudonym "Michael Cole". He subtitled his article "The Story of an Unsuccessful Recruitment", stating that Hungarian intelligence services had reportedly attempted, but failed, to recruit him as an agent.

Lendvai claims he achieved some of these goals by entertaining Hungarian officials, including Gyula Ortutay, at Austrian striptease shows. These officials subsequently intervened on his behalf. Lendvai also asserts that some reports attributed to an operative codenamed "Urbán" that portrayed him as a source were fabricated by Urbán himself.

After his emigration, the Hungarian state security (ÁVH) placed him on a blacklist.

In his 2007 publication, Lendvai identified his accuser from 1953 as journalist Péter Vajda, who was also an armed officer of the ÁVH at the time. When Lendvai wrote the article, Vajda was reportedly leading the press office of the National Security Cabinet in Ferenc Gyurcsány's government.

== Bibliography ==
- Tito, a magyar nép ellensége (1951)
- Franciaország keresztúton (1955)
- Eagles in Cobwebs: Nationalism and Communism in the Balkans (1969)
- Anti-Semitism without Jews: Communist Eastern Europe (1971)
- Anti-Semitism in Eastern Europe (1972)
- Kreisky – Portrait eines Staatsmannes (1974)
- Die Grenzen des Wandels: Spielarten des Kommunismus im Donauraum (1977)
- Bureaucracy of Truth: How Communist Governments Manage the News (1981)
- Das Einsame Albanien: Reportage aus dem Land der Skipetaren (1985)
- Das eigenwillige Ungarn: Innenansichten eines Grenzgängers (1986)
- Hungary: The Art of Survival (1990)
- Between Hope and Disillusionment – Reflections on the Change in Eastern Europe (1994)
- Honnan – Hová? – Gondolatok a közép- és kelet-európai változásokról (1995)
- Auf schwarzen Listen. Erlebnisse eines Mitteleuropäers (1996)
- Blacklisted: A Journalist's Life in Central Europe (1998)
- Hungarians: A Thousand Years of Victory in Defeat (2003)
- A világ egy kritikus európai szemével (2005)
- Az osztrák titok – 50 év a hatalom kulisszái mögött (2007)
- Best of Paul Lendvai (2008)
- One Day That Shook the Communist World: The 1956 Hungarian Uprising and Its Legacy (2008)
- Als der Eiserne Vorhang fiel (2009)
- Inside Austria: New Challenges, Old Demons (2010)
- Mein verspieltes Land – Ungarn im Umbruch (2010)
- Az eltékozolt ország (2011)
- Három élet – Beszélgetés Mihancsik Zsófiával (2012)
- Hungary: Between Democracy and Authoritarianism (2012)
- Leben eines Grenzgängers (2013)
- Orbáns Ungarn (2016)
- Orbán: Europe's New Strongman (2017)
- Die verspielte Welt. Begegnungen und Erinnerungen (memoir, 2019)
- Vielgeprüftes Österreich: Ein kritischer Befund zur Zeitenwende (2022)
- Über die Heuchelei. Täuschungen und Selbsttäuschungen in der Politik (2024)

== Decorations and awards ==
- 1974: Karl Renner Prize
- 1974: Golden Decoration of Honour for Services to the Republic of Austria
- 1980: Appointed Professor
- 1984: Karl Renner Prize of Vienna
- 1986: Grand Decoration of Honour for Services to the Republic of Austria
- 1989: Gold Medal for services to the city of Vienna
- 1990: Great Gold Medal of Styria
- 1990: Grand Cross of Merit of the Federal Republic of Germany
- 1994: Austrian Cross of Honour for Science and Art, 1st class
- 1994: Bruno Kreisky Prize for Political Books for Between hope and disillusionment – reflections on the changes in Eastern Europe
- 1997: Silver Commander's Cross of Honour for Services to the province of Lower Austria
- 1998: Axel Corti Prize
- 1999: Commander's Cross of the Order of Merit of the Republic of Poland
- 2000: Grand Prize of Burgenland Journalist Award
- 2001: Television Award of the Austrian Adult Education for his biography of Bruno Kreisky (with Helene Maimann)
- 2001: Award of the Budapest Corvinus Europe Institute
- 2001: Grand Gold Decoration for Services to the Republic of Austria
- 2002: Dr. Alois Mock Europe Prize
- 2003: Commander's Cross with Star of the Order of Merit of the Republic of Hungary
- 2003: Fellowship of the Centre for Applied Policy Research (LMU Munich)
- 2005: Austrian State Prize for Cultural Journalism
- 2008: Honorary Award of the Austrian book trade for tolerance in thought and action.
- 2018: European Book Prize in the category „Essay“ for Orbán. Europe’s New Strongman
- 2020: Bruno Kreisky Award for the Political Book – for lifetime achievement in journalism
- 2022: Concordia Award for lifetime achievement
- 2024: Goldener Rathausmann - Award by the City of Vienna
