= Dubník =

Dubník Csúz
- Municipality
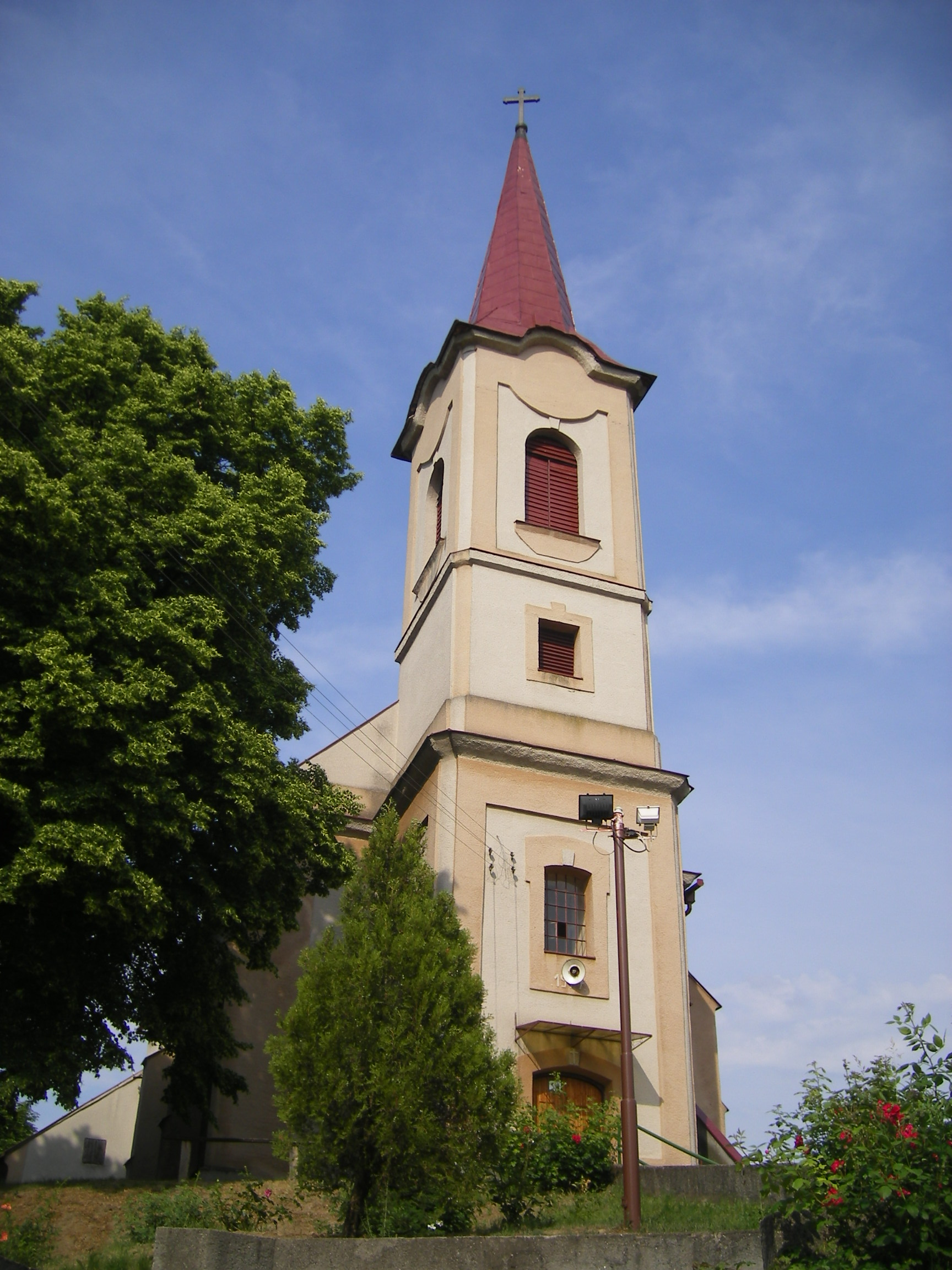

- Flag Coat of arms

- Location of Dubník in the Nitra Region Location of Dubník in Slovakia
- Coordinates: 47.95°N 18.42°E
- Country: Slovakia
- Region: Nitra Region
- District: Nové Zámky District
- First mentioned: 1236

Area
  - Total: 41.00 km^{2} (15.83 sq mi)
- Elevation: 138 m (453 ft)

Population (2025)
  - Total: 1,499
- Time zone: UTC+1 (CET)
  - Summer (DST): UTC+2 (CEST)
- Postal code: 941 35
- Area code: +421 35
- Vehicle registration plate (until 2022): NZ
- Website: www.obec-dubnik.sk

Dubník (Hungarian: Csúz) is a municipality and village in the Nové Zámky District in the Nitra Region of south-west Slovakia.

== History ==
In historical records the village was first mentioned in 1236.

== Geography ==
The municipality lies at an altitude of 138 metres (453 ft) and covers an area of 41.00 km^{2} (15.83 sq mi) (2025).

== Population ==
Population statistic (10 years)
Year	1995	2005	2015	2025
Count	1766	1763	1644	1499
Difference		−0.16%	−6.74%	−8.81%

Population statistic
Year	2024	2025
Count	1520	1499
Difference		−1.38%

It has a population of 1499 people (2025-12-31).

== Ethnicity ==
The population is about 65% Hungarian and 35% Slovak.

== Facilities ==
The village has a public library and a football pitch.

== Genealogical resources ==
The records for genealogical research are available at the state archive "Statny Archiv in Nitra, Slovakia"

- Roman Catholic church records (births/marriages/deaths): 1703-1898 (parish A)
- Lutheran church records (births/marriages/deaths): 1785-1896 (parish B)
- Reformated church records (births/marriages/deaths): 1815-1945 (parish A)

== Famous residents ==
- Nathan Ehrenfeld (1843–1912), Chief Rabbi of Prague, was a native of Dubník.

== See also ==
- List of municipalities and towns in Slovakia
