= Vix Note =

Communiqué sent by Fernand Vix

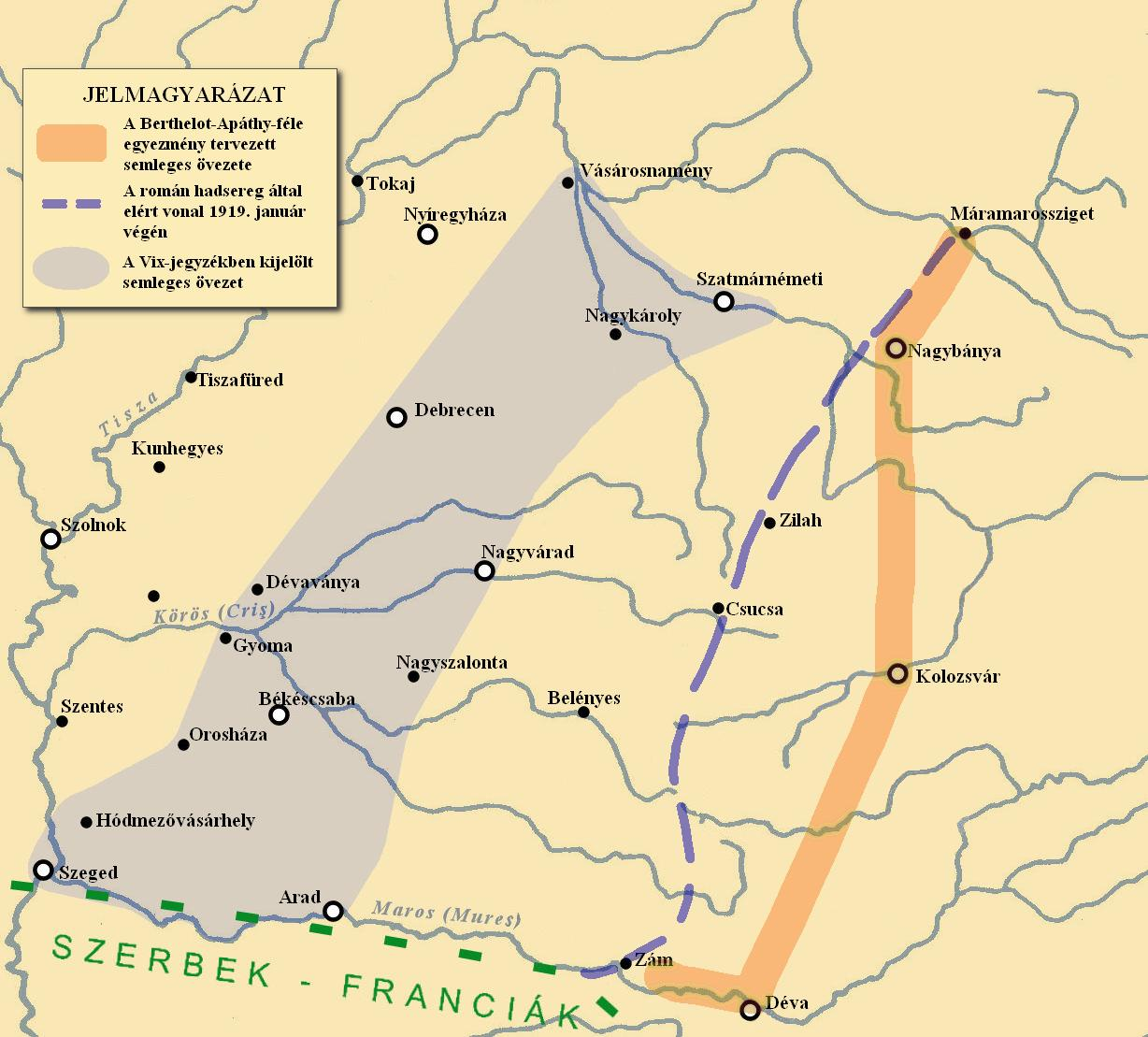
Limit of Hungarian control in March 1919 (blue dashed line), and the neutral zone outlined in the Vix Note (gray area)

The Vix Note or Vyx Note (Hungarian: Vix-jegyzék or Vyx-jegyzék) was a communiqué note sent by Fernand Vix (or Vyx), a French lieutenant colonel and delegate of the Entente, to the government of Mihály Károlyi of the First Hungarian Republic, notifying them of the Entente's intention to make Hungary evacuate and withdraw from more territory than agreed in the Armistice of Belgrade. Thus, the note made apparent the extent of territory which Hungary would be obliged to cede in the Treaty of Trianon. Its contents were decided during the Paris Peace Conference in late February 1919, but only delivered to Károly on 20 March (which meant only 18 hours remained for its implementation). This contributed to Károly's formal rejection of the note on the next day and his outreach to Soviet Russia for help. The Vix Note's effect was that it "quashed the Károlyi government’s hope that a democratic Hungary could negotiate a better settlement" and delegitimized the government in the eyes of many Hungarians. The note played a decisive role in the downfall of the First Republic and the establishment of the Hungarian Soviet Republic, and is credited with bringing about the end of Hungarian rule over the region of Transylvania.

== See also ==
- Treaty of Trianon

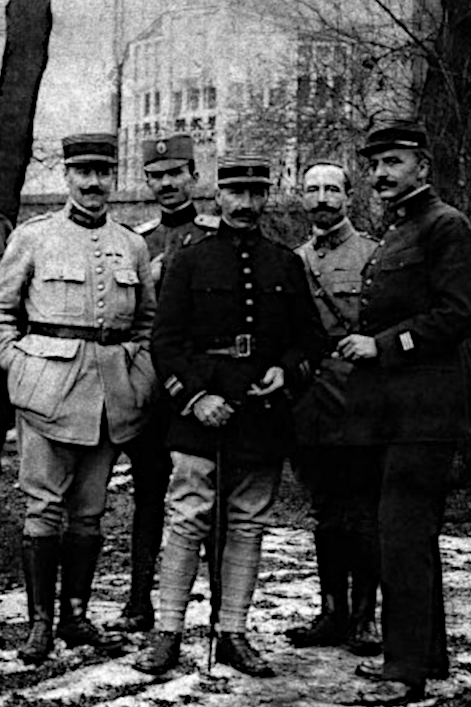
Fernand Vix (in the middle)
