= Mihály Károlyi =

President of Hungary from 1918 to 1919 (1875–1955)

Count Mihály Károlyi de Nagykároly
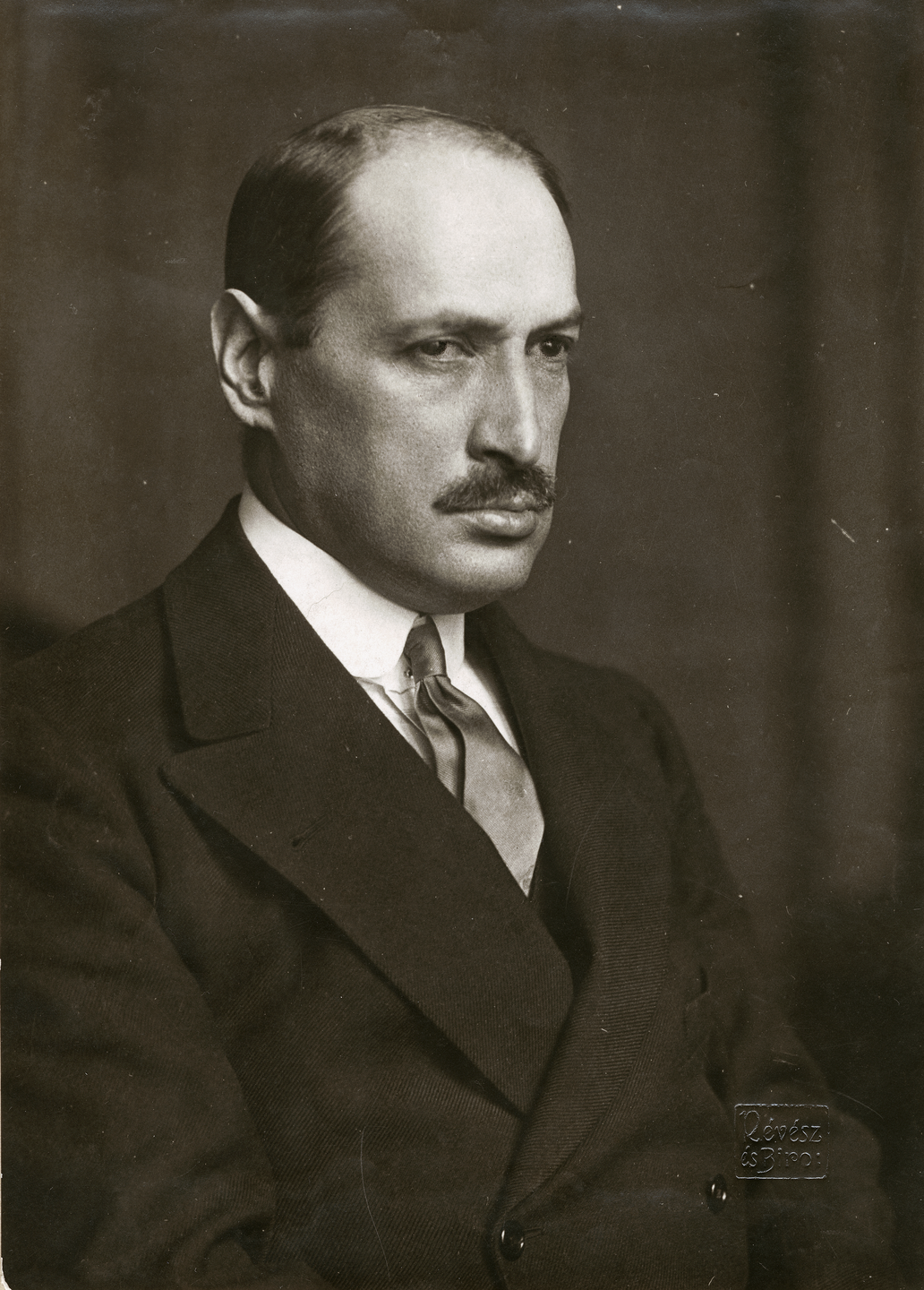
- Formal portrait, 1919

1st President of Hungary (Note: Acting until 11 January 1919)
- In office 16 November 1918 – 21 March 1919
- Prime Minister: Dénes Berinkey
- Preceded by: Office established
- Succeeded by: Sándor Garbai

Prime Minister of Hungary
- In office 31 October 1918 – 11 January 1919
- Monarch: Charles IV (Note: until 13 November 1918)
- President: Himself
- Preceded by: János Hadik
- Succeeded by: Dénes Berinkey

Personal details
- Born: Ádám György Miklós Károlyi de Nagykároly; 4 March 1875 Fót, Austria-Hungary
- Died: 19 March 1955 (aged 80) Vence, France
- Party: National Independence Kossuth Party
- Spouse: Katinka Andrássy (m. 1914)
- Children: 3

Count Mihály Ádám György Miklós Károlyi de Nagykároly (Hungarian: gróf nagykárolyi Károlyi Mihály Ádám György Miklós; English: Michael Adam George Nicholas Károlyi; 4 March 1875 – 19 March 1955) was a Hungarian politician who served as a leader of the short-lived and unrecognized First Hungarian Republic from 1918 to 1919. He served as prime minister between 1 and 16 November 1918 and as president between 16 November 1918 and 21 March 1919.

Born into one of Hungary's wealthiest families, Károlyi had a prodigal youth and only became active in the Hungarian Parliament in his thirties. There, he became one of the body's foremost progressive voices and often found himself at odds with Prime Minister István Tisza and the Dual Monarchy. Károlyi was a vocal opponent of the First World War and became a proponent of the Entente, which made him extremely popular as the war began to turn against the Central Powers. After the Aster Revolution, Károlyi became the Prime Minister and President of the new Hungarian Republic. A zealous adherent of the Fourteen Points and a pacifist, Károlyi demobilized the exhausted Royal Hungarian Honvéd and pursued a progressive domestic policy of enfranchisement and redistribution. Károlyi's brief rule was ended by the ascent of the equally short-lived Hungarian Soviet Republic. He lived most of the rest of his life in exile, and died in France in 1955.

In the present day, Károlyi's demobilization of the Hungarian army is widely blamed for the massive territorial losses which Hungary experienced at the hands of Czechoslovakia, Romania, and Serbia which were later formalized by the Treaty of Trianon. Despised by the Horthy government, he was celebrated by the Hungarian People's Republic for his committed liberalism and left-wing sympathies, but his reputation again suffered after the fall of communism.

== Early life and career ==
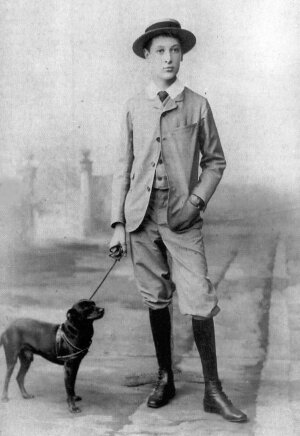
Mihály Károlyi in Franzensbad around 1887

=== Early life ===
The Károlyis were an illustrious and very wealthy Catholic aristocratic family who had played an important role in Hungarian society since the 17th century. His parents were cousins: his father was Count Gyula (Julius) Károlyi (1837–1890), his mother was Countess Georgine Károlyi.

Mihály Károlyi was born on March 4, 1875, in the Károlyi Palace in the aristocratic palace district of Pest. He was born with a cleft lip and cleft palate, which deeply determined his entire childhood and personality development. His mother died early from tuberculosis and his father soon remarried. His father considered Mihály unsuitable for a more serious career, because of his speech disorder. However, when he was 14, a successful operation enabled him to eventually speak normally.

Throughout his life, he has learned three foreign languages at almost native level: English, German and French. His mindset and character were shaped by external influences: including hatred towards the Habsburg dynasty, the traditional anti-German sentiment of his family, his foster father, the world-view of uncle Sándor Károlyi, his adoration of the 1848 revolution in Hungary, his idea of organizing peasants into farming cooperatives. Having unbroken optimistic faith in the rapid development of science and technology, which he thought would solve all problems of humankind, he developed an idealistic devotion to the cause of social justice based on his reading experiences, including the French Encyclopédie and Jules Verne novels.

Although he was not interested in university lectures, he managed to pass his exams with the help of a tutor and obtained a law degree. At the age of 24, he became an unbridled adult, throwing himself into the nightlife, with enthusiasm; he spent his time flagrantly, playing cards, having fun hunting. He lived in French spa towns, attended many international horse races and early automobile races in various European countries. His political opponents later sought to denounce his hedonistic lifestyle as a youth.

He was interested in all technical innovations: he enjoyed driving cars and became a passionate collector of race cars and yachts. On one occasion a fellow pilot of Louis Blériot flew the plane to Hungary that had crossed the English Channel. Károlyi bargained with the pilot to board the famous plane and make a flight over Budapest. It was characteristic of the young Károlyi's recklessness that he sat on the frame of the one-seater airplane and clung to the iron bars, making his flight with legs hanging in the air. Being a Francophone, as was the tradition in his family, he spent several years in Paris; he also traveled across the United Kingdom and the United States. As a gambling addict, he was known for his card battles, his losses and for his "dandy" lifestyle in famous casinos across Western Europe. Around the age of 30, the young tycoon started to get serious and subsequently developed an interest in politics and public life.

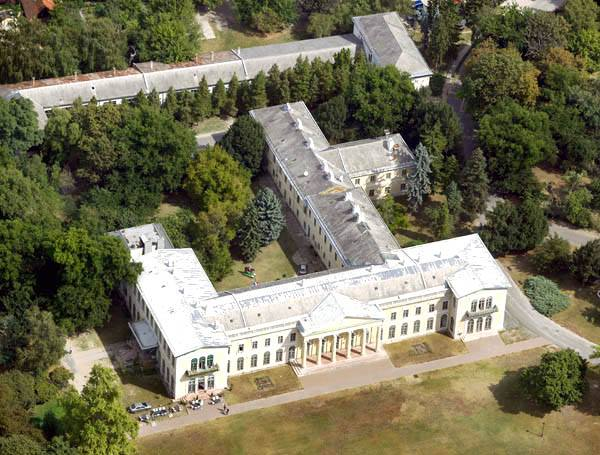
One of his grandmother's Castle at Fót, where Mihály grew up

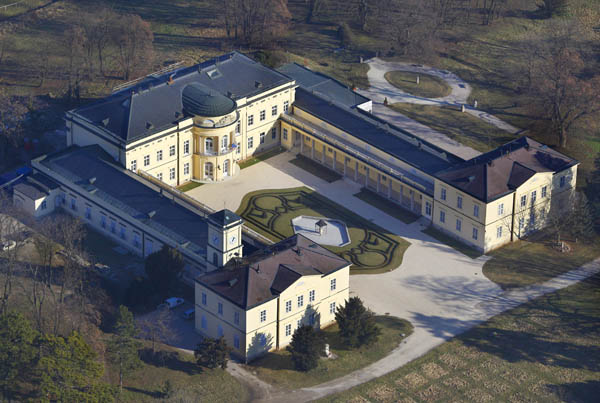
Fehérvárcsurgó Castle

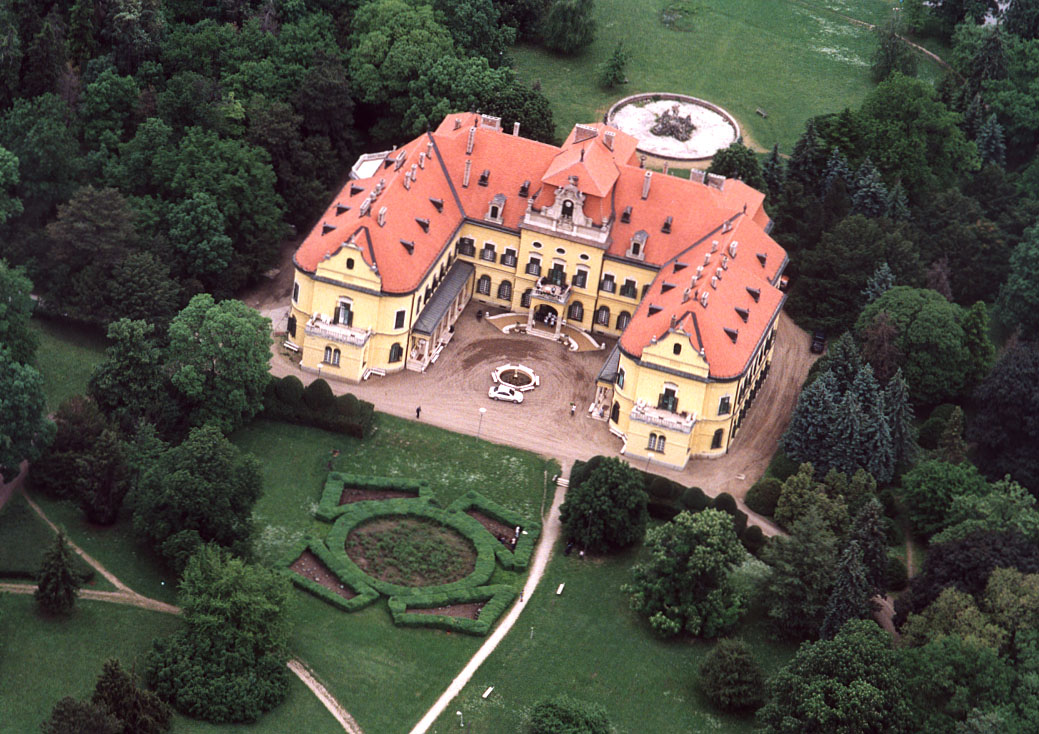
Nagymágocs Castle

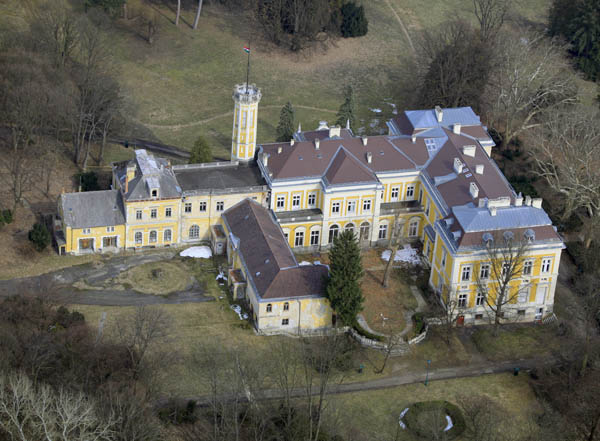
Füzérradvány Castle

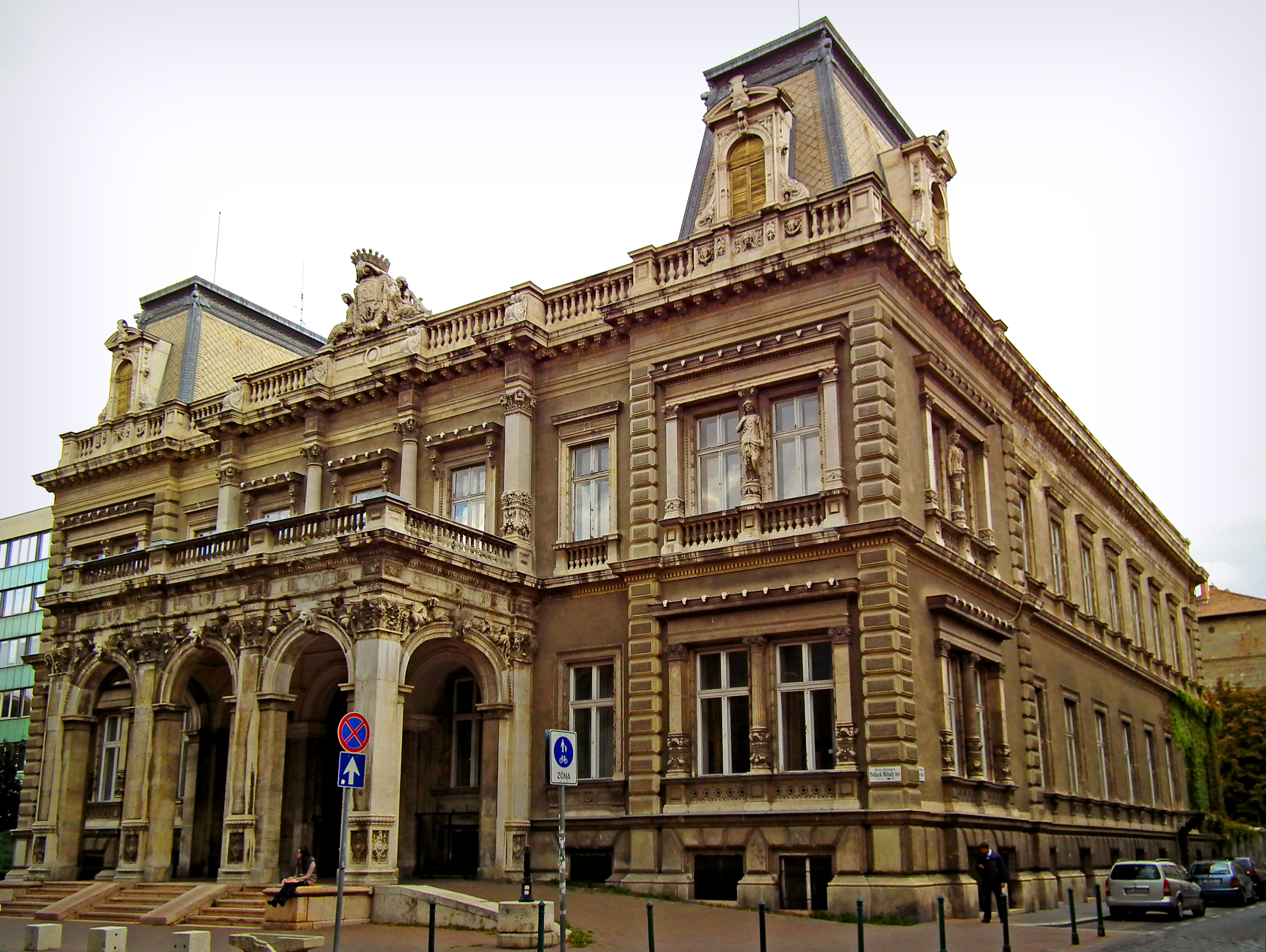
Károlyi-palota, Budapest downtown

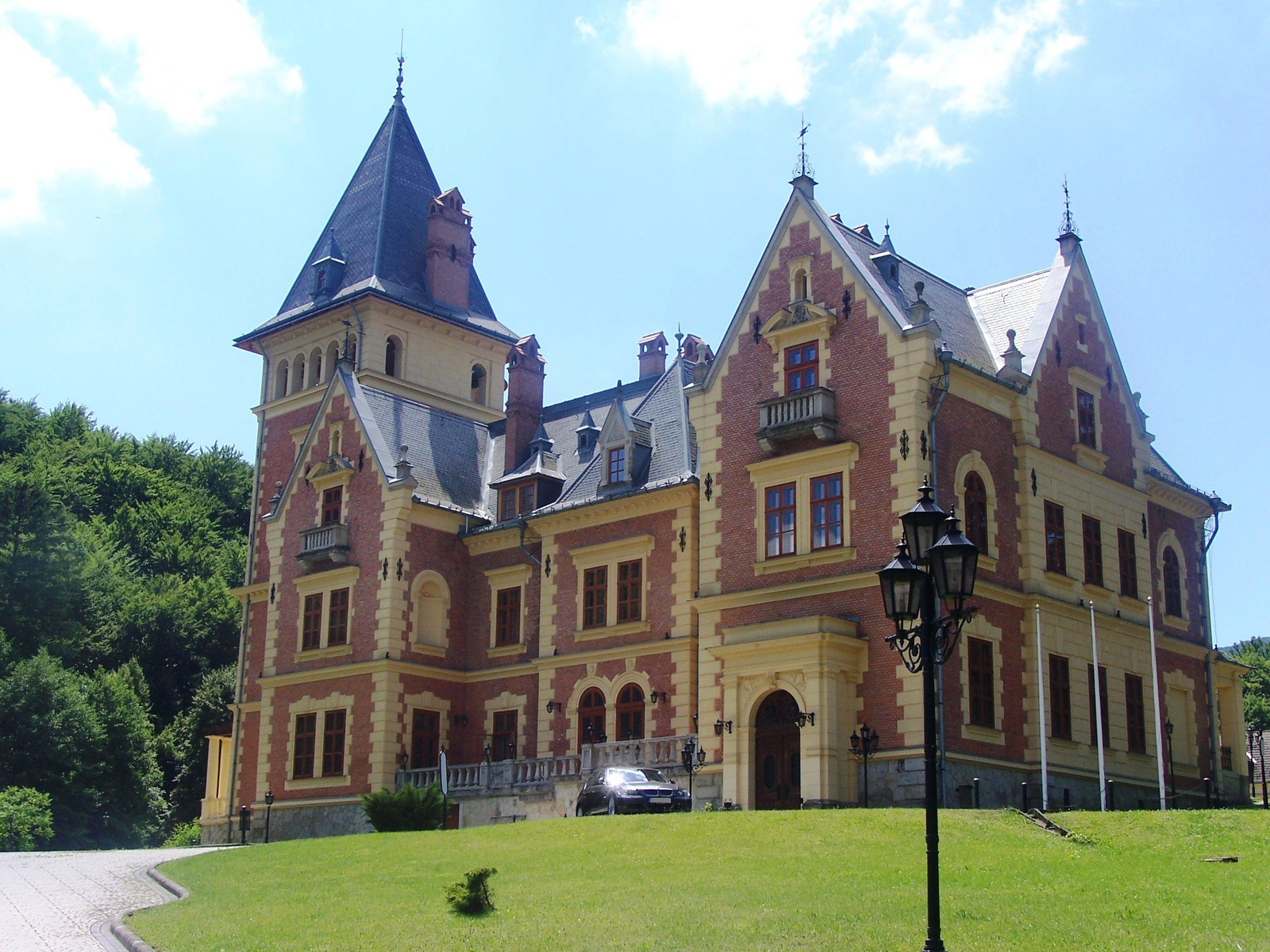
Parádsasvár hunting lodge

=== Early political career ===
In his youth, he was a wastrel, but, as he grew older, he became devoted to more serious pursuits. In 1909, he became the President of the OMGE (National Agricultural Society), the main rural organization of the nobility. Initially a supporter of the existing political and social system in Hungary, Károlyi gradually became more progressive, leaning to left-wing orientation during his career.

He ran in the 1901 and 1905 and 1906 parliamentary elections in the lower house of parliament (House of Representatives) without success; however, as a count, he had a right to participate in the Upper house (House of Magnates) of parliament. In 1910, Károlyi was elected to Parliament as a member of the opposition Party of Independence, so he could participate in political life as a member of the House of representatives in parliament. István Tisza and Mihály Károlyi became implacable political enemies following the 1905 elections. Their debates in parliament further increased their mutual personal antagonism with time.

An important milestone in his confrontation with liberal conservatism was when, in June 1912, after the vote on the Defence Act, the parliamentary speaker István Tisza put an end to the opposition's protests with police violence. Opposition members, who had been removed from the chamber, then joined forces with the democratic and socialist opposition outside parliament to organise joint people's rallies. At one of the first of these, on 16 June 1912 in Miskolc, Károlyi appeared as a speaker alongside the Civic Radical Democrat Oszkár Jászi and the social democrat Jenő Landler.

In January 1913, Károlyi was challenged to a duel by prime minister István Tisza, after refusing to shake Tisza's hand following a political disagreement. The 34-bout duel with cavalry sabres lasted an hour until Tisza cut Károlyi's arm and the seconds ended the duel.

=== World War I, political campaign for the Allied Powers ===
In 1914, at the time of the assassination of Archduke Franz Ferdinand, Károlyi was on his American tour, where he gave lectures at various universities with his friend Zsigmond Kunfi.

During his American tour, he sent telegram messages to Budapest for the Magyarország magazine, where he shared his geopolitical opinion about the deepening crisis in Europe.

“By throwing ourselves entirely into Germany’s arms we have put ourselves in a situation which is called stalemate in chess. We are not in check-mate, but any move by us will mean checkmate.”

— Magyarország magazine, July 4, 1914

“The entire note [ultimatum to Serbia] with its firmness and rudeness and the formidable severity of the claims it includes gives the impression, and cannot give any other impression, that the Monarchy wants to settle her account with Serbia. We might say that the Monarchy wants war... Even if the war is victorious, we are going to pay the price with a nation’s greatest treasure, humán life, the life of the young... We are not, we cannot be, enthusiastic about the war.”

— Magyarország magazine, July 11, 1914

On August 5, when the war broke out, his ship arrived in Le Havre after returning from his long trip to the United States. He was promptly arrested, as a citizen of a belligerent country, despite the fact that Austria-Hungary was not yet at war with the French Republic. Consequently, he was released from prison. Later, he was arrested again for several weeks in Bordeaux for being a citizen of a belligerent country. However, after promising that he wouldn't fight against the French during the war, he finally got a passport from the Bordeaux authorities. Afterwards he travelled to Genoa via Madrid and Barcelona and then returned home. On his way home to the Kingdom of Hungary, he crossed Italy at a time when Italy had not yet declared war on the Central powers and was therefore considered a neutral country.

Károlyi was opposed to the involvement in the First World War. Initially, he remained silent on these feelings, and even read a pro-war declaration from his party. He did this as a result of internal pressure, having faced indignation after refusing to support war loans. In 1915, he volunteered in the 1st Hungarian Hussar Regiment in Budapest after being called for service. Later on, in his memoirs, he regretted having ever reluctantly supported the war due to political pressure. The horrors of the war prompted him to accept isolation to openly oppose the war. From 1916 onward, he openly demanded that the war be ended and peace concluded immediately, even at the price of dissolving the alliance of Germany. Károlyi became part of a small but very active pacifist anti-war maverick faction in the Hungarian parliament. He and his followers withdrew to create their own separate party, which initially had only no more than 20 members. According to Tibor Hajdu, Károlyi's movement soon grew in popularity.

Far from being at the forefront of politics until 1916, "the public heard far more about his motor car speeding, car accidents and card battles than his speeches in parliament." It was only after the Hungarian public opinion began to become disillusioned with the war that Károlyi began to look like a real alternative to the governing forces. His consistent and firm support for peace in his speeches made him very popular in the last year of the war.

In his parliamentary speeches, Károlyi opposed the alliance of the Austro-Hungarian Monarchy and the German Empire: instead he advocated friendship between the peoples and argued against war and supported a pro-Entente foreign policy. Károlyi made contact with British and French Entente diplomats behind the scenes in Switzerland during the war. He argued for peace with the Allies, loosing ties between Austria and Hungary, abolishing the property-based franchise requirements that allowed only 5.8% of the population to vote and run for office before the war, and giving women the right to vote and hold office. In particular, Károlyi demanded in 1915 that veterans should be granted the right to vote, which won so much popular support that it enraged Prime Minister, Count István Tisza. In 1916 Károlyi broke off with his party, which had found his openly pro-Entente attitude to be too radical and dangerous for a war-time pacifist faction in parliament. Therefore, Károlyi formed a new party, called the United Party of Independence of 1848; generally known as the Károlyi Party.

In January 1918, Károlyi proclaimed himself a follower of Woodrow Wilson's Fourteen Points.

=== Marriage and family ===
On 7 November 1914 in Budapest, Károlyi married Countess Katalin Andrássy de Csíkszentkirály et Krasznahorka, with whom he had three children. As Károlyi's wife was a member of one of Hungary's most powerful families; by the marriage, Károlyi got under the protection of his influential father-in-law. His only son, Adam Károlyi served in the Royal Air Force, who crashed due to a technical fault while testing an aircraft over the Isle of Wight in 1939.

== Leading the Democratic Republic ==
President Mihaly Karolyi's speech after the proclamation of the First Hungarian Republic on 16 November 1918

Béla Linder's pacifist speech for military officers, and declaration of Hungarian self-disarmament on 2 November 1918.

Protest of the Transylvanian National Council against the occupation of Transylvania by Romania on 22 December 1918

On 25 October 1918 Károlyi had formed the Hungarian National Council. Károlyi as the most prominent opponent of continued union with Austria, seized power during the Aster Revolution on 31 October. In 1918, when the Aster Revolution broke out and it became clear that Mihály Károlyi would become head of government, his half-brother, Count József Károlyi (1884-1934), (chief bailiff of Fejér county, member of parliament), resigned from his post and became the most aggressive political opponent of Mihály Károlyi's government. King Charles IV was all but forced to appoint Károlyi as his Hungarian prime minister. One of Károlyi's first acts was to repudiate the compromise agreement on 31 October, effectively terminating the personal union with Austria and thus officially dissolving the Austro-Hungarian monarchy and state. On the 1st of November, Károlyi's new government decided to recall all of the troops, who were conscripted from the territory of Kingdom of Hungary, which was a major blow for the Habsburg's armies on the fronts.

Károlyi would have preferred to keep the monarchy and some link to Austria if possible. Only after Charles's withdrawal from government on 16 November 1918 made Károlyi proclaim the Hungarian Democratic Republic, with himself as provisional president. On 11 January 1919 the National Council formally recognized him as president.

Sigmund Freud, the Austrian psychologist—who had known the two politicians personally—wrote about the assassination of István Tisza and the appointment of Mihály Károlyi as new prime minister of Hungary:

"I was certainly no adherent of the Ancien Régime, but it seems doubtful to me whether it is a sign of political shrewdness to beat to death the smartest of the many counts [Count István Tisza] and to make the stupidest one [Count Mihály Károlyi] president."

In the same vein, the British writer Harold Nicolson, who had known Károlyi during his exile in Britain, when reviewing Károlyi's memoirs in 1957 noted that:

"he had many qualities, but unfortunately lacked those for which a man is taken seriously by serious people".

Baron Lajos Hatvany described Károlyi's leadership noting:

"From the discussions no decisions arose, and from the decisions – no actions. A cabinet? No, it was a debating club".

Károlyi's cabinet lasted from 31 October 1918 to 19 January 1919. On 19 January 1919, Károlyi resigned as Prime Minister to concentrate exclusively on his duties as President of the Republic. He appointed Dénes Berinkey to form the new government.

=== Foreign policy ===
On the 1st of November, his new Hungarian government decided to recall all of the troops, who were conscripted from the territory of Kingdom of Hungary. It became a major blow for the Habsburg's armies on the Italian Front which accelerated and secured the collapse of Austria-Hungary.

The Hungarian Royal Honvéd army still had more than 1,400,000 soldiers when Mihály Károlyi was designated as prime minister of Hungary. However, he took up the case of pacifism in accordance with U.S. President Woodrow Wilson's Fourteen Points by ordering the unilateral self-disarmament of the Hungarian army, leaving the country defenseless at a time of particular vulnerability. This happened on 2 November 1918, while Béla Linder served as minister of war which made the occupation of Hungary directly possible for the relatively small military forces of such surrounding nations as the Serbian army, and the Czechoslovak and the Romanian armies.

Károlyi had appointed Oszkár Jászi as the new Minister for National Minorities of Hungary. During their brief periods in power, Oszkár Jászi, hoped to create an "Eastern Switzerland" by persuading the non-Magyar peoples of Hungary to stay as part of the new Hungarian Republic. Jászi also immediately offered democratic referendums about the disputed borders to minorities, however, the political leaders of those minorities refused the very idea of democratic referendums at the Paris peace conference. Instead the Czech, Serbian, and Romanian political leaders chose to attack Hungary to seize territories. The military and political events changed rapidly and drastically after the Hungarian unilaterial self-disarmament. During the rule of Károlyi's pacifist cabinet, Hungary lost control over approx. 75% of its former pre-WW1 territories (325 411 km^{2}) without armed resistance and was subject to foreign occupation.

- on 5 November 1918, the Serbian army, with the help of the French army, crossed southern borders,
- on 8 November, the Czechoslovak Army crossed the northern borders,
- on 10 November d'Espérey's French-Serbian army crossed the Danube river and was poised to enter the Hungarian heartland,
- on 11 November Germany signed an armistice with Allies, under which they had to immediately withdraw all German troops in Romania and in the Ottoman Empire, the Austro-Hungarian Empire and the Russian Empire back to German territory and Allies to have access to these countries.
- on 13 November, the Romanian army crossed the eastern borders of the Kingdom of Hungary.
- on 13 November, Károlyi signed the Armistice of Belgrade with the Allied Powers. It limited the size of the Hungarian army to six infantry and two cavalry divisions. Demarcation lines defining the territory to remain under Hungarian control were made, and

For their part, the neighboring countries used the so-called "struggle against communism", against the capitalist and liberal government of Count Mihály Károlyi.

The lines would apply until definitive borders could be established. Under the terms of the armistice, Serbian and French troops advanced from the south, taking control of the Banat and Croatia. Czechoslovak forces took control of Upper Hungary and Carpathian Ruthenia. Romanian forces were permitted to advance to the River Maros (Mureș). However, on 14 November, Serbia occupied Pécs.

Many citizens thought that Károlyi could negotiate soft peace terms with the Allies for Hungary. Károlyi headed the Provisional Government from 1 November 1918 until 16 November, when the Hungarian Democratic Republic was proclaimed. Károlyi ruled Hungary through a National Council, transformed into the government that consisted of his party in alliance with the large Hungarian Social Democratic Party and the small Civic Radical Party led by Oszkár Jászi.

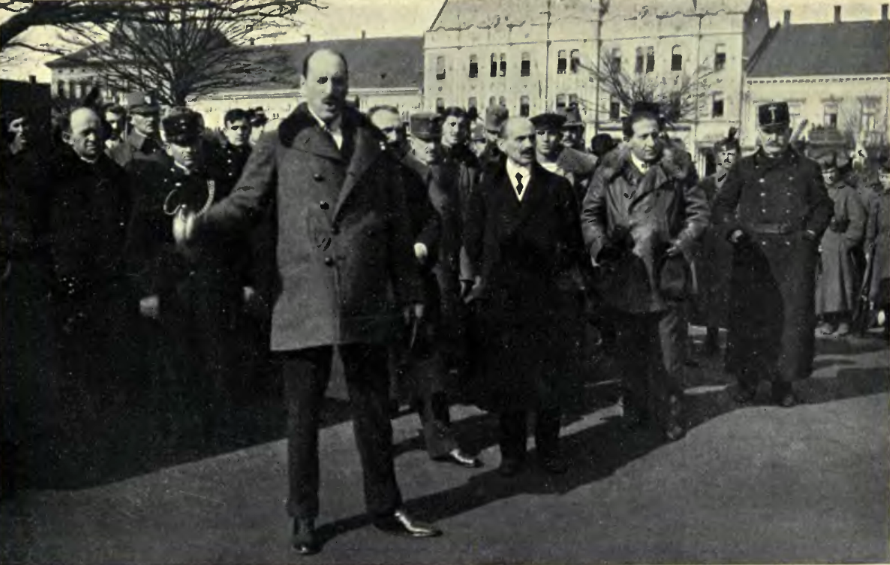
Mihály Károlyi in a speech

Additional trouble for the new government occurred over the question of the armistice. Austria-Hungary had signed the Armistice of villa Giusti (close to Padua, Italy) with the Allies on 3 November 1918. Since Hungary was now independent, some in the Cabinet argued that Hungary needed to sign a new armistice. Against his better judgement, Károlyi agreed to this idea, and had Hungary sign in November 1918, a new armistice with the Allies in Belgrade with the Allied Commander in the Balkans, the French General Louis Franchet d'Esperey.

General Franchet d'Esperey treated the Hungarians with open contempt and imposed a harsher armistice on the defeated nation than the Padua Armistice had. The Belgrade Armistice was nonetheless seen as a victory for Károlyi, as it represented some degree of de facto recognition of his government on the part of the Allies. The Belgrade Armistice was well received back in Budapest. French recognition of Károlyi's government did not, however, materialize, and it soon became apparent that the French Foreign Office considered the treaty a "dead letter". Moreover, Károlyi's opponents argued that by needlessly seeking a second armistice, Károlyi had worsened Hungary's situation.

Károlyi distributing his lands among the peasants in Kápolna on 23 February 1919

Upon the National Council's seizure of power, Minister of Defence Béla Linder recalled all troops from the front and instructed all Hungarian units to lay down their arms. By Károlyi's own admission, this order was informed mainly by a fear among Károlyi's cabinet that soldiers could return armed, potentially causing disorder, threatening the new government, or prompting Allied intervention. Linder's much maligned policy was very quickly reversed when Czechoslovak troops occupied several districts claimed by the Prague government in western Hungary on November 9. As a result, Linder resigned his post as Minister of Defence on November 9 and was replaced with Albert Bartha, who was now faced with the task of reorganizing and re-arming the Hungarian military. In a speech on November 11, Károlyi announced that the Hungarian army had ceased disarming and was prepared to defend Hungary from the Czech incursion. When Prague sent Gendarmes to occupy several majority Slovak districts in western Hungary, Károlyi followed through on his promise to defend Hungary's borders, mobilizing divisions of repatriated POWs who managed to repel the Czech forces. When a new demarcation line was negotiated, Hungary ceded administration of the areas given to the Prague government, but refused to withdraw its army any further. All through the winter of 1918–19, the Romanians, the Yugoslavs and the Czechoslovaks often broke the armistice in order to seize more territory for themselves. After January 1919, Károlyi began to consider the idea of an alliance with Soviet Russia, through Károlyi was opposed to the idea of Communism in Hungary itself.

In addition, as Hungary had signed an armistice, not a peace treaty, the Allied blockade continued until such time as a peace treaty was signed. Hungary had suffered from food shortages throughout the war and deaths from starvation had become common from 1917 onwards. Furthermore, the country had been overwhelmed with refugees from Transylvania and Galicia.

=== Domestic politics ===
At the same time, there existed various revolutionary councils, which were dominated by the Social Democrats, which were not unlike the Soviets (Councils) that existed in Russia in 1917. This situation of Dual Power gave Károlyi responsibility without much power while giving the Social Democrats power without much responsibility. The war deepened social differences and disparity, since the wealthy social strata not directly involved in the war could continue to live unchanged, i.e. carefree lives, and the wealth of the large entrepreneurs who supplied the war effort could even continue to grow enormously, while the wages of the workers who lived on wages were constantly and significantly devalued. The economic incompetence of the new government which printed more and more money, leading to massive inflation and even more impoverishment. Károlyi's failure to improve living conditions or persuade the Allies to lift the blockade led to public criticism of Károlyi.

Making things worse was the creation of Czechoslovakia which had cut Hungary off from supplies of German coal. Hungary which possessed little coal depended upon German coal imports. Without coal, most had to live without heat in the winter of 1918–19, and the railroad network had gradually ceased to function. The collapse of railroads in their turn caused the collapse of industry and hence mass unemployment.

Of the more than forty laws and almost 400 decrees introduced by the Károlyi and Berinkey governments and passed by the National Council, the new electoral law gave the right to vote to all men over 21 and women over 24 who could read and write in any domestic language. General elections under the new law were scheduled for April 1919.

During the War, freedom of the press and freedom of assembly were temporarily banned on the grounds of wartime interests. The Karolyi government reintroduced freedom of the press, freedom of association and freedom of assembly. With the economy on the verge of collapse as a result of the war, and with mass poverty and inflation, social reforms were introduced: unemployment benefit, tax arrears waivers, a ban on the employment of children under 14, wage increases, a token severance payment for demobilised soldiers, the introduction of an eight-hour working day and the extension of social security. Alongside the democratic establishment, the governments of the Karolyi regime also sought to consolidate internal order, but with little success. Furthermore, the Social Democrats who were Hungary's largest party by far, frequently undercut Károlyi and imposed their decisions on him without taking responsibility for their actions. Károlyi wished to transfer almost all of the rural lands to the peasants. To set an example, he gave all of his own vast family estates to his tenants. But this was the only land transfer that took place; the Social Democrats blocked any measures that might give the control of those lands to the peasantry on the grounds that it was promoting capitalism. In February 1919, the government used police force against two recently formed extremist organisations: it dissolved the dictatorial right-wing government and the Hungarian National Defence League (MOVE) led by Gyula Gömbös, which demanded the armed defence of the historic (pre-World War I) Hungarian borders. After an unemployment demonstration on 20 February 1919, which led to an armed confrontation in front of the Budapest offices of the Népszava newspaper, he imprisoned thirty-two leaders of the Communist Party of Hungary, including their leader, Béla Kun.

== Downfall of Károlyi government ==
On 20 March 1919 the French presented the Vix Note ordering Hungarian troops further back into Hungary; it was widely assumed that the military lines would be the new frontiers. Károlyi and Prime Minister Dénes Berinkey were now in an untenable position. Although they did not want to accept this French demand, they were in no position to reject it either. On 21 March, Berinkey resigned. Károlyi then announced that only the Social Democrats could form a new government. It was decided that an alliance would be sought with the Communists led by Béla Kun. Unbeknownst to Károlyi, the Democratic Socialists and the Communist Party came to the decision that Károlyi should be removed from power. Hours after Berinkey resigned, the newly merged Hungarian Socialist Party announced Károlyi's resignation and the formation of the Hungarian Soviet Republic. The liberal president Károlyi was arrested by the new Communist government on the first day. He managed to make his escape and flee to Paris in July 1919.

== Later life ==
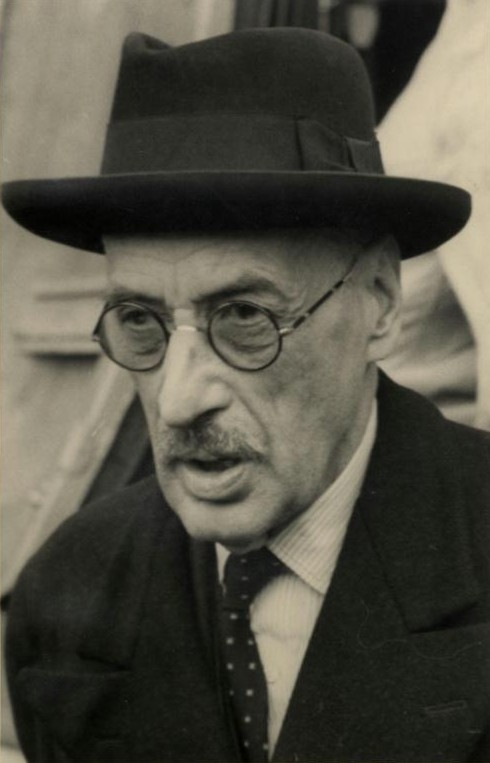
Károlyi in 1948

On 10 April 1919, Romanian troops began to invade Hungary to forestall reconquest of Transylvania. A provisional government was set up by Count Julius Karolyi (brother of Michael), Count István Bethlen, Admiral Horthy, and Archduke Joseph at Szeged (under French occupation). On 4 July 1919 Károlyi fled to Austria, later he moved to Czechoslovakia and Yugoslavia. In late 1919, he went into exile in France and during World War II, to Britain.

While in exile, Károlyi managed to get the formerly moderate right-wing Hungarian newspaper, the Wiener Magyar Zeitung, to serve his cause; on 5 June 1920, one day after the signing of the Treaty of Trianon, Károlyi welcomed the economic blockade of Hungary, which was already in a difficult situation because of the White Terror, and the tone of the subsequent articles became even harsher:

"Words will not win Horthy, he must be crushed by deeds. The terrible thing about brutality is that brutality cannot be defeated without using brutality. Horthy's actions show him to be an enemy of humanity ... so humanity must renounce the tradition of humanity in his face."

Károlyi began a vigorous propaganda campaign against the emerging Horthy regime from his exile in France. Károlyi attempted to negotiate with the so called "Little Entente" through Edvard Beneš who as the foreign minister of Czechoslovakia played a crucial role in establishing the Little Entente. Károlyi also reached out to the Austrian Social Democratic Chancellor, Karl Renner.

Count Károlyi wanted to achieve the disarmament of the Hungarian National Army and the removal of Horthy to such a degree that he even considered doing so through foreign intervention and force of arms. However, the attempt to remove Horthy had little impact: Renner and Beneš did send a memorandum to the Entente Powers, but their leaders had already decided that it would be best for Horthy to remain in power to serve as a stabilizing force after the signing of the Treaty of Trianon.

Eduard Benes sent Mihály Károlyi to Moscow as a Czechoslovak diplomat, as it seemed that the Soviet Red Army was on the verge of victory and would soon occupy Poland. As a diplomat, Károlyi wanted to ensure that the Red Army respected the independence of Transcarpathia and Slovakia. However, the Soviet Red Army was unexpectedly defeated by Marshal Pilsudski in August (Battle of Warsaw).

=== Charged with treason ===
In the early years of the Horthy era, between 1921 and 1923, Károlyi was subjected to an officially sanctioned, contrived trial in which he was convicted of high treason and sentenced to the full confiscation of his assets. The judgment held him guilty of high treason due to the unilateral disarmament of the large Honvéd army, which fatal decision had militarily enabled the Allies to dismember Hungary in the Treaty of Trianon. In the interpretation of the court verdict, he betrayed Hungary during his leadership. Károlyi was formally declared a persona non grata. Due to procedural and substantive irregularities in the trial, sharp criticism of the proceedings and verdict was voiced in the British and French parliaments.

=== Private life in interwar period ===
In 1924, while Károlyi's wife was in the United States she came down with typhoid fever. Károlyi applied for a visa to come to the United States to visit her, but the State Department imposed a gag order, preventing him from giving any political speeches, as the State Department believed him to be a Communist. A year later, Countess Károlyi was denied a visa to visit the United States, but Secretary Kellogg of the State Department refused to explain on what grounds her visa denial was made. Morris Ernst acted as Károlyi's lawyer for these issues.

=== Anti-fascism ===
In August 1944, Károlyi, as president of the Hungarian Council in Great Britain, and his colleagues held a meeting to protest against the ongoing genocidal persecution of Hungarian Jews. Throughout the Horthy era, Károlyi was in a state of official disgrace in his homeland.

=== Post WW2 ===
In 1946, Károlyi, who by that time had become a socialist, returned to Hungary and from 1947 to 1949 served as the Hungarian Ambassador to France. In 1949, he resigned in protest over the show trial and execution of László Rajk.

He wrote two volumes of memoirs in exile; Egy egész világ ellen ("Against the Entire World") in 1925 and Memoirs: Faith without Illusion in 1954.

He died in Vence, France, on 19 March 1955 at the age of 80.

== Legacy ==
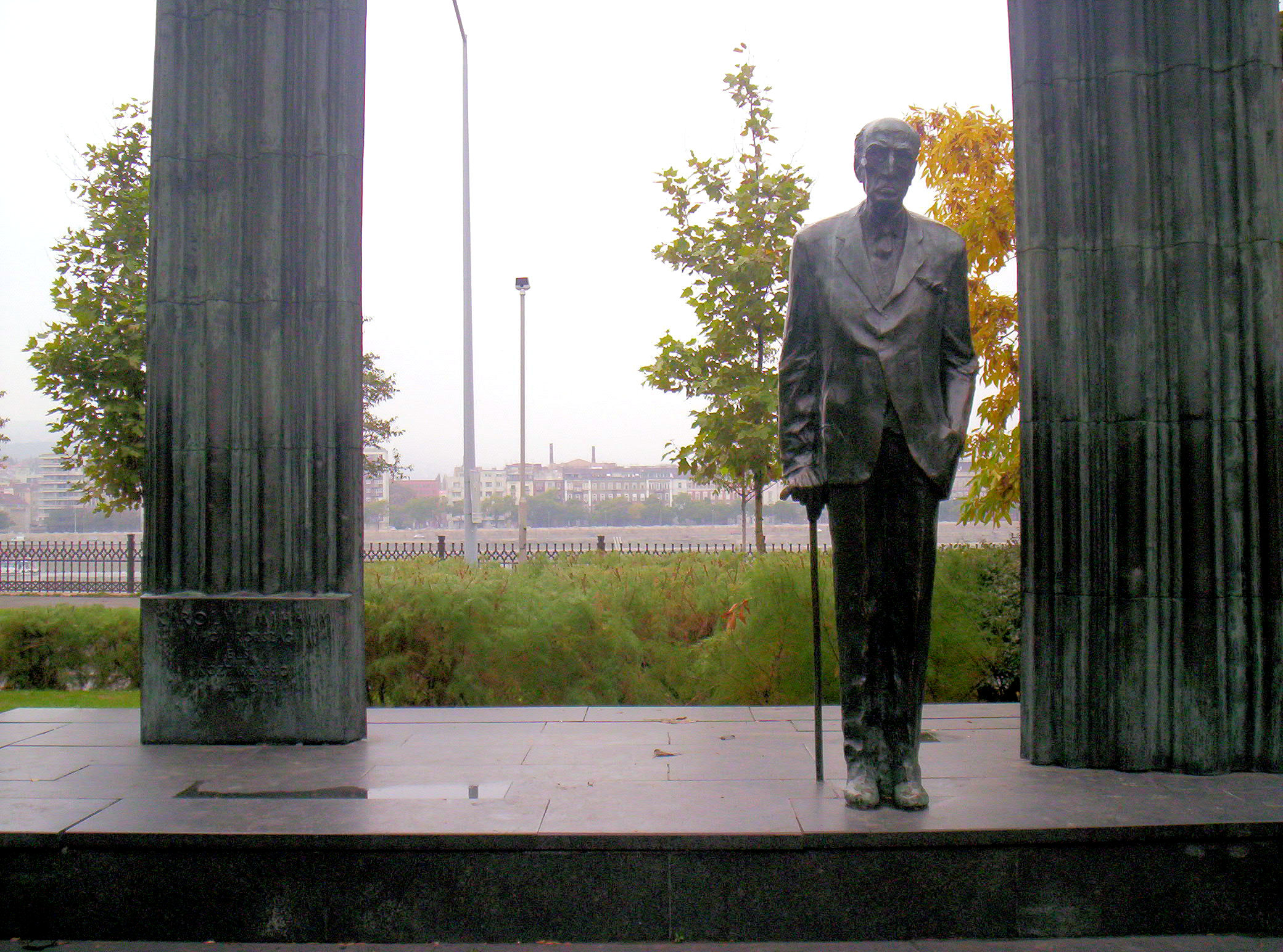
Károlyi's statue where it stood on Lajos Kossuth Square, Budapest

During the late Kádár era, Károlyi was praised as the founder of the first Hungarian republic. Many streets and other public places were named after him, and even a few statues were erected in his honor. The most famous one, sculpted by Imre Varga, was installed in Budapest's Kossuth Lajos tér in 1975. After the fall of communism his statue was repeatedly covered with red paint by unknown persons. At other times a wire was hung around his neck, a sign was hung on the wire with the inscription "I am responsible for Trianon". The statue was dismantled at dawn on 29 March 2012, as part of the redevelopment of Kossuth Square, and transported to a foundry in Kőbánya, Finally Károlyi's statue was moved to Siófok at the residence of its creator. By the 21st century however, the view on him has become mixed at best. Many Hungarians blame him for the disintegration of Greater Hungary and for the establishment of the Hungarian Soviet Republic of 1919. At the same time, throughout Hungary, most cities also renamed their own streets named after him, sometimes in a creative way. In Budapest for example the name of the prominent street in downtown, was changed from "Károlyi Mihály utca" to simply "Károlyi utca", removing the association with him.

== References and further reading ==
- Deak, Istvan. "Budapest and the Hungarian Revolutions of 1918-1919." Slavonic and East European Review 46.106 (1968): 129–140. online
- Deak, Istvan "The Decline and Fall of Habsburg Hungary, 1914–18" pages 10–30 from Hungary in Revolution edited by Ivan Volgyes Lincoln: University of Nebraska Press, 1971.
- Hajdu, Tibor. "Michael Károlyi and the Revolutions of 1918–19." Acta Historica Academiae Scientiarum Hungaricae 10.3/4 (1964): 351–371. online
- Károlyi, Mihály. Fighting the World : The Struggle for Peace (New York: Albert & Charles Boni, 1925).
- Károlyi, Mihály. Memoirs of Michael Karolyi: faith without illusion (London: J. Cape, 1956). online free to borrow
- Menczer, Bela "Bela Kun and the Hungarian Revolution of 1919" pages 299–309 from History Today Volume XIX, Issue #5, May 1969, History Today Inc: London
- Pastor, Peter (1976). Hungary between Wilson and Lenin: the Hungarian revolution of 1918–1919 and the Big Three. Columbia University Press. ISBN 0914710133.
- Polanyi, Karl. "Count Michael Károlyi." Slavonic and East European Review (1946): 92–97. online
- Szilassy, Sándor Revolutionary Hungary, 1918–1921, Astor Park. Fla., Danubian Press 1971.
- Vassady, Bela. "The" Homeland Cause" as Stimulant to Ethnic Unity: The Hungarian-American Response to Károlyi's 1914 American Tour." Journal of American Ethnic History 2.1 (1982): 39-64. online
- Vermes, Gabor "The October Revolution In Hungary" pages 31–60 from Hungary in Revolution edited by Ivan Volgyes Lincoln: University of Nebraska Press, 1971.

Political offices
Preceded by János Hadik	Prime Minister of Hungary; 1918–1919	Succeeded by Dénes Berinkey
Preceded by Tivadar Batthyány	Minister of Foreign Affairs; 1918–1919	Succeeded by Dénes Berinkey
Preceded by Sándor Popovics	Minister of Finance; Acting; 1918	Succeeded by Pál Szende
Preceded by Károly IV as King of Hungary	Provisional President of Hungary; 1918–1919	Succeeded by Sándor Garbai as Chairman of the Hungarian Central Executive Council
