= Aster Revolution =

Post-WWI revolution in Hungary

- Part of the aftermath of World War I and the Revolutions of 1917–1923
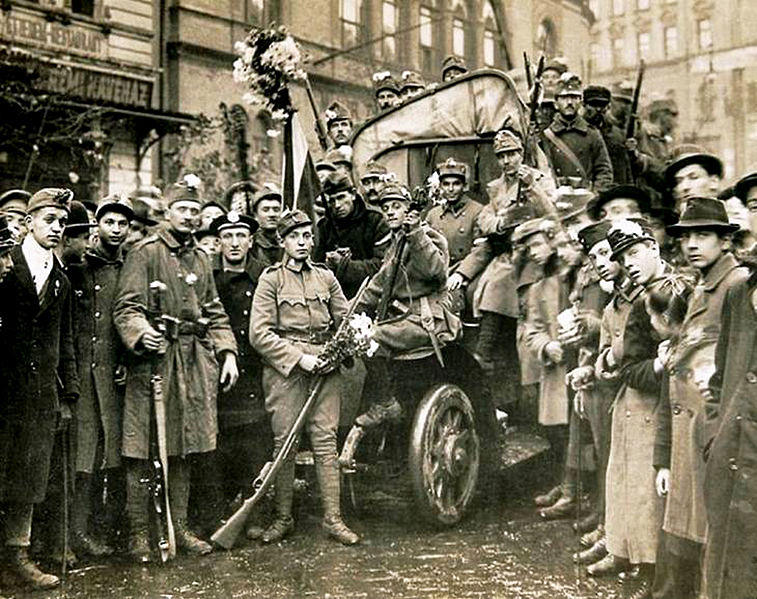
- Revolutionary soldiers wearing aster flowers, 31 October 1918
Date	28–31 October 1918 (3 days)
Location	Hungary
Result	Revolutionary victory: Dissolution of Austria-Hungary; End of the First World War in Hungary; Establishment of the First Hungarian Republic

Belligerents
Hungarian National Council: Hungarian Social Democratic Party; Soldiers' councils	Austria-Hungary: Kingdom of Hungary

Commanders and leaders
Mihály Károlyi; János Hock; József Pogány; Imre Csernyák; István Friedrich	Charles IV; Archduke Joseph; János Hadik; Sándor Wekerle; Géza Lukachich

The Aster Revolution or Chrysanthemum Revolution (Hungarian: Őszirózsás forradalom) was a revolution in Hungary led by Count Mihály Károlyi in the aftermath of World War I. It resulted in the foundation of the short-lived First Hungarian People's Republic.

The revolution was brought about by widespread protests as World War I wore on, from which Mihály Károlyi emerged as the leader of the newly proclaimed First Hungarian People's Republic. This lasted between 16 November 1918 and 21 March 1919. Supporters of Károlyi, many of whom were demobilised soldiers, adopted the aster as the symbol of the revolution. Following its success, Hungary declared its independence. As a result, Austria-Hungary dissolved.

== Background ==
In the second half of 1918, the course of World War I turned decisively against the Central Powers. The German Spring Offensive collapsed by July. The Central Powers likewise suffered at the Austrian offensive on the Italian front. In mid-September, the Entente broke through the Macedonian Front. Unable to halt their advance, Bulgaria capitulated on 29 September; the position of the Austrian military became untenable.

Romania and Italy had been promised large territorial concessions earlier in the war. However, there had been differing opinions over the future dismemberment of Austria-Hungary (the 14 points of Woodrow Wilson in January 1918 had demanded only "autonomous development" of nations). Meanwhile, emerging in influence among the Entente powers had been demands by Italian-backed Czechs and the Southern Slavs. After abortive attempts to negotiate a separate peace, plans among Entente leaders increasingly favoured the dissolution of the Austro-Hungarian monarchy. By Summer 1918 the Entente recognised the Czechoslovak National Council as the future government of an independent Czechoslovakia. Therefore, Austro-Hungarian peace offers based on the 14 points were rejected.

In a final attempt to salvage his empire, Emperor Charles on 16 October legitimised the formation of National Councils and published the Völkermanifest, declaring federalisation of the Austrian part of the empire. This, however, only accelerated collapse: by the end of October, secession had been announced by most National Councils, including the Austrian Germans themselves.

In Hungary, on 17 October, the ruling Third Wekerle Government abolished the 1867 Compromise, retaining only a personal union with Austria. On the same day, former prime minister István Tisza declared the war "lost" before Parliament. Unable to cope, Wekerle resigned on 23 October.

Charles (who was in Gödöllő during Wekerle's resignation, but had to return to Vienna due to the deteriorating situation) was inclined to nominate Károlyi as Prime Minister to stabilise the situation. He changed his mind following the advice of prominent Hungarian politicians like Gyula Andrássy (then newly appointed Joint Foreign Minister). As a result, no new Prime Minister got nominated until 30 October. In the meantime, Archduke Joseph August of Austria was named homo regius, Governor of Hungary.

On 24 October, the Entente launched its final offensive on the Italian Front. Hungarian units of the already disintegrating army flooded home, destabilising the already precarious situation on the street.

== Events ==
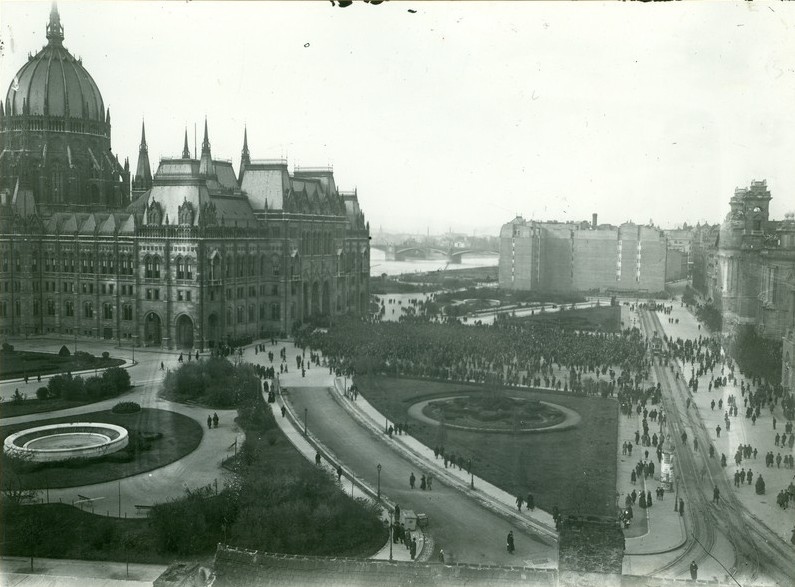
Demonstration in favour of the National Council in Budapest on 27 October

On the evening of Wekerle's resignation on 23 October 1918, the Hungarian National Council was established from opposition forces, most prominent among them Mihály Károlyi and his Party of Independence and '48. It also included Oszkár Jászi's Radical Party and Ernő Garami's Social Democratic Party of Hungary. They set up their headquarters in Hotel Astoria in the centre of Pest. Independently, two days later, a Soldiers' Council was established by flight lieutenant Imre Csernyák. Two days afterwards, on 27 October, the National Council nominated him as chairman of the committee of the armed forces.

By this time, protests had erupted in Budapest's streets in favour of a National Council, and demanding Károlyi as Prime Minister. On 28 October 1918 the crowd (István Friedrich among them) attempted to march on Buda Castle. They were intercepted and fired upon by the police while crossing the Chain Bridge. This "Battle of the Chain Bridge" left 3 or 4 dead and dozens injured, and it only inflamed the crowds. Géza Lukachich was tasked to keep order in Budapest. Although he was firmly set against the National Council, his forces quickly deserted him, rendering him powerless to stop the revolution.

The trigger point came on 30 October, when the Emperor nominated János Hadik, an establishment politician as Prime Minister. Soldiers gathering on Gizella Tér (now Vörösmarty tér) swore allegiance to the National Council. They tore off the rose on their caps, replacing it with an aster, which quickly became a revolutionary symbol. Over the course of the day, the Soldiers' Council took over strategic points in the city, and freed political prisoners. Notably, on the initiative of Béla Szántó, they blocked the transport of two military companies from Eastern Railway Station, who then turned to the revolution and looted the train for weapons. Unions halted rail traffic to and from Budapest. Telephone exchanges, posts and banks were seized. Lukachich himself was arrested. At this point the National Council, still wanting to avoid a violent confrontation, had lost control. Their members slept in Hotel Astoria, uncertain of the future.

At 3 on the morning of 31 October 1918, János Hadik called up the Emperor and notified him of his resignation. He had been Prime Minister for a mere 17 hours, the shortest tenure in Hungarian history. The Emperor relented, nominated Károlyi as Prime Minister, and asked him to form a government with the parties of the National Council. Károlyi assembled his cabinet that day. The revolution technically didn't change Hungary's legal status, as the new government still swore an oath to the king. However, afraid of the radicalized public opinion, Károlyi asked to be relieved of his oath by the next day 1 November, which he was granted. Subsequently, the government took a new oath to the Hungarian National Council.

István Tisza, the former prime minister, became a target of anger for the revolutionary crowds, blaming him for the war. He was assassinated the afternoon of 31 October in his villa near City Park by disgruntled soldiers.

Although the revolution in Budapest was relatively bloodless, a wave of violence and looting swept across the countryside as returning soldiers wreaked havoc on representatives of the old order. Local administration and the gendarmerie collapsed, replaced by local National Councils and a variety of spontaneously formed paramilitaries to protect local interests. The government attempted to formalize and regulate them as the National Guard (Nemzetőrség). Targets of violence differed from region: apart from landowners and administrators, Jewish merchants were often targeted, especially in the east. In areas mostly inhabited by non-Magyars, unrest took an explicitly ethnic character. Unrest continued throughout November and December, and in many places order was only restored by the arrival of Czech, Romanian, Serbian or French troops.

== Aftermath ==
Although the Károlyi government initially didn't declare independence, the collapse of Habsburg power in Austria made the distinction meaningless. On 13 November, after a similar proclamation was made for the Austrian throne, Charles issued a proclamation recognizing Hungary's right to determine the form of the state and withdrawing from Hungarian affairs of state (although he did not explicitly resign). This opened the legal path to declare full independence as the Hungarian People's Republic on 16 November 1918. Károlyi, who was already Prime Minister, would also serve as the provisional head of state. That day, both houses of parliament dissolved themselves, and an expanded Hungarian National Council was called representing local councils that sprung up throughout the country during the revolution. This National Council would serve as a provisional legislature throughout Károlyi's reign, as free elections would ultimately never be held.

The Hungarian Royal Honvéd army still had more than 1,400,000 soldiers when Mihály Károlyi was announced as prime minister of Hungary. Károlyi yielded to U.S. President Woodrow Wilson's demand for pacifism by ordering the disarmament of the Hungarian army. This happened under the direction of Béla Linder, minister of war in the Károlyi government. Due to the full disarmament of its army, Hungary was to remain without a national defense at a time of particular vulnerability. The Hungarian self-disarmament made the occupation of Hungary directly possible for the relatively small armies of Romania, the Franco-Serbian army and the armed forces of the newly established Czechoslovakia. During the rule of Károlyi's pacifist cabinet, Hungary rapidly lost control over approx. 75% of its former pre-WW1 territories (325 411 km^{2}) without armed resistance and was subject to foreign occupation.

In March 1919, the republic was itself overthrown by a Communist putsch, which established the Hungarian Soviet Republic. Soviet Hungary soon collapsed due to internal discontent and a Romanian invasion and, after a brief revival of the People's Republic, the monarchy was restored, now as an independent country.

== See also ==
- Carnation Revolution
