= Károly Soós =

Károly Soós may refer to:

- Károly Sós (1909–1991), Hungarian footballer and manager
- Károly Soós (Minister of Defence) (1869–1953), Hungarian military officer and politician
