= Lajos Für =

Hungarian politician and historian

Minister of Defence of Hungary
- In office 23 May 1990 – 15 July 1994
- Prime Minister: József Antall
- Preceded by: Ferenc Kárpáti
- Succeeded by: György Keleti

Personal details
- Born: 21 December 1930 Egyházasrádóc, Hungary
- Died: 22 October 2013 (aged 82) Budapest, Hungary
- Party: MDF (1987–1996)
- Spouse: Friderika Bíró
- Children: Ágnes Sarolta; Balázs
- Profession: Politician, historian

Lajos Für (21 December 1930 – 22 October 2013) was a Hungarian politician and historian, who served as Minister of Defence between 1990 and 1994. From 1994 to 1996 he was also chairman of the Hungarian Democratic Forum (MDF), the ruling conservative party led by late prime minister József Antall to his death in 1993.

Für was born in Egyházasrádóc. He participated in the Hungarian Revolution of 1956. In later years, he was active in Magyar Gárda, a paramilitary organization which had connections to Jobbik and was described as neo-fascist. He died, aged 82, on 22 October 2013, in Budapest.

== Personal life ==
He was married with Friderika Bíró, with whom he had two children, Ágnes and Balázs. Ágnes was the wife of the Hungarian Fidesz-politician Tamás Deutsch.

== Publications ==
- A csákvári uradalom a tőkés gazdálkodás idején (1970)
- Mennyi a sok sírkereszt? Magyarország embervesztesége a második világháborúban (1987)
- Hol vannak a katonák? (1988)
- Kisebbség és tudomány (1989)
- Világjáró magyarok (1990)
- Sors és történelem (1991)
- Szabadon szeretnék sírni (1993)
- Jobbágyföld – parasztföld (1994)
- Magyar sors a Kárpát-medencében (2001)
- Az én történelmem I. (2003)
- A Varsói Szerződés végnapjai – magyar szemmel (2003)
- "Ne bántsd a magyart!". Bartók és Kodály történelemszemlélete; Kairosz, Bp., 2005
- Bevérzett mámor, 1956; Kairosz, Bp., 2006
- Világjáró magyarok; 2nd ed.; Ligatura, Szentendre, 2009
- Kárpát-medencei létünk a tét; Kairosz, Bp., 2010

Political offices
Preceded by Ferenc Kárpáti	Minister of Defence; 1990–1994	Succeeded by György Keleti
Preceded by Iván Pető	Leader of the Opposition; 1994–1996	Succeeded by József Torgyán
Party political offices
Preceded by József Antall	President of the Hungarian Democratic Forum; 1994–1996	Succeeded by Sándor Lezsák
