= Aurél Stromfeld =

Hungarian general (1878–1927)

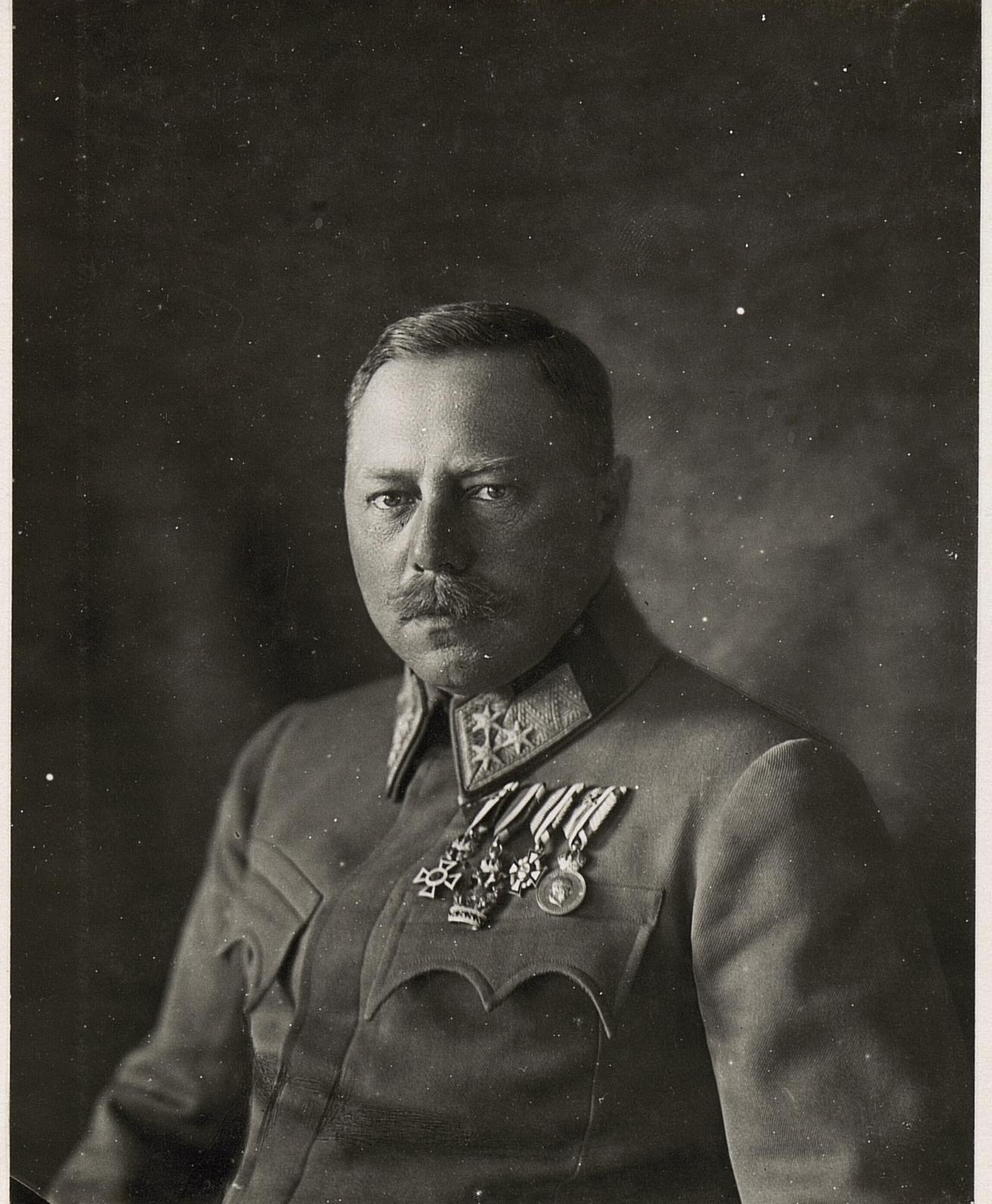
Aurél Stromfeld in 1918

Aurél Emil Stromfeld (19 September 1878 – 10 October 1927) was a Hungarian general. He was the Colonel General of the Austro-Hungarian General Staff and Chief of the General Staff of the Hungarian Red Army during the Hungarian Soviet Republic. He graduated from the Ludovika Academy in 1896, then studied at the Vienna Military Academy until 1905. After serving as a troop officer in Igló, he became a lecturer at the Ludovika in 1907. In 1913, he was appointed the first professor of the Ludovika. In the First World War he served on the Serbian front, where he led the evacuation of Belgrade, and was then posted to the Eastern Front. After the Russian surrender he was sent to the Italian front. There he was caught up in the military collapse of 1918, after which he returned home with the troops he could keep together.

He was an exceptional military talent. He took command of the army of the Soviet Republic. He played a major role in stopping the advance of Czech and Romanian troops. He resigned after the adoption of the Clemenceau note.

== Youth ==
Aurél Stromfeld was born on 19 September 1878 in Újpest, Hungary, as the third child of a German-origin, Evangelical intellectual family. His mother was Johanna Táborszky, and his father, János Stromfeld, was an engineer at the Schlick-Nicholson factory. His maternal grandfather was a railway engineer, his uncle was a mechanical engineer, and his mother's uncle was an architect. His brother, János Somfai, was a socialist journalist, and his great-nephew, Dávid Somfai Kara, was a turcologist and mongolologist.

Aurél's father died when he was six years old, and his mother lived with her family, mostly women, in Újpest, where they had bought a house with the severance pay from his father's workplace. After completing four years of elementary school, Aurél attended the Markó Street High School, where he also spent only four years. Despite coming from a family of engineers, his family wanted him to become a doctor. However, the family's finances were depleted, and they could not afford to educate Aurél, even though he was a good student and enjoyed free tuition.

In 1892, Aurél decided to attend the Ludovika Academy, which was a military academy that trained officers for the Hungarian Army. He applied for a private foundation scholarship, established by János Buttler, with the help of his high school principal. His mother initially opposed his decision, but since the only alternative was to become an apprentice, she eventually accepted that he would become a soldier. Aurél began his studies at the academy on 4 October 1892, with full support, free clothing, and an allowance from the foundation. A friend he met at the academy, Zoltán Mátyássy, waived his orphan's support in favor of Aurél, as he came from a wealthy family, which helped to solve the financial problems of Aurél's family.

As a second-year student, Aurél traveled to Recsk with his fellow cadets for a three-week field exercise, where he met a young girl at a ball on the last day and fell in love. However, after returning, they could not maintain their relationship, and Aurél's despair caused him to neglect his studies, damaging his previously excellent grades. His teacher, Captain Imre Hadfy, warned him, and Aurél began to study hard again, but he could not achieve excellent results in several subjects. As a result, he finished fourth in his class and did not become a lieutenant, as the top students did, but instead started his service as a cadet officer, and was sworn in on 18 August1896. He was assigned to the 18th Honvéd Infantry Regiment in Sopron.

== Before World War I ==
In 1897, Stromfeld was promoted to lieutenant and trained new recruits, worked in the regimental office, and served as a battalion adjutant first in Sopron and then in Munkács. In 1899, he returned to the Ludovika Academy to attend a one-year course before taking the entrance exam for the War Academy in Vienna. That year, he lived with Mátyássy in an apartment on Üllői Avenue. He completed the course as the top student in his class, and in October 1900, he began his studies at the War Academy in Vienna as a senior lieutenant. Out of 110 students, 10 were from the Hungarian Army, and Stromfeld's academic performance was the best among them. He met his future wife, Adrienne Urbányi, the daughter of retired General Edmund Urbányi, in Vienna. After his sister Margit died of tuberculosis on Christmas 1900, Stromfeld's mother moved to Vienna to live with him.

Stromfeld and Adrienne grew closer, and they got engaged in 1902. However, due to the high officer's bond, they were unable to get married. In 1905, Stromfeld graduated from the War Academy in ninth place, received a staff appointment, and served in Vienna for a year. His mother tried to help the young couple by using her bank deposit, but the bank went bankrupt during Stromfeld's service in Vienna, and his mother became mentally unhinged and soon died. After his mother's funeral, Stromfeld submitted a request to reduce the marriage bond, but it was rejected. His fellow officers in Pozsony were outraged by the decision, and the army leadership, fearing a national scandal, accepted his second request. As a result, Stromfeld and Adrienne got married on 15 April 1905, and he was promoted to captain on 1 May. He had to serve as a company officer in Igló for a year, and his wife was able to join him.

After completing his company service, Stromfeld was sent to the officer school in Kassa (Košice), and in 1907, he returned to the Ludovika Academy as an instructor. There, he promoted a modern view of warfare based on the results of the Russo-Japanese War and wrote a study on the important role of non-commissioned officers in the army. In it, he argued that officer ranks should be based on merit rather than high school performance, and that people from poorer backgrounds should be able to join the officer corps. In 1908, after his Balkan vacation, the deputy military attaché in Sofia asked him to write about his military observations during his trip. Weeks later, in Budapest, he realized that they were interested in his opinion on the annexation of Bosnia-Herzegovina, which had created tension in the region. In preparation for a potential military conflict, Stromfeld wrote a book called "Hadseregszervezés" (Army Organization), in which he discussed new lessons and which became a new textbook at the Ludovika Academy. As a result, the Hungarian Ministry of Defense asked for his help in developing a modern combat regulations manual. In 1912, he passed his staff officer exam and was promoted to major.

In 1913, Stromfeld was appointed as a professor at the War Academy in Vienna, the first among those serving in the Hungarian Army, and was tasked with teaching tactics. He became popular quickly and befriended Theodor Körner, another popular professor at the academy, who invited him to his social circle, where they engaged in uninhibited conversations. Among Stromfeld's students were Gyula Gömbös, future prime minister, and Archduke Károly Albert.

== During World War I ==
After the Sarajevo assassination, he was sent to the Balkans with Captain Wachtel to study the sites of the Second Balkan War. On 23 July, after the Monarchy's unacceptable ultimatum, they were received in Bulgaria by the same military attaché who had received Stromfeld six years earlier, and they inquired about Bulgaria's military preparedness. The attaché then transmitted the order to return home by the shortest route, which would have meant traveling through Serbia, but they did not dare to take this risk and instead returned through Romania, arriving a day late.

Stromfeld was assigned to the XIII Corps in Zagreb, where he was responsible for organizing logistics. He performed this task excellently, and supplies never faltered despite the poor road conditions in Serbia. At great cost, they managed to capture the transportation hub of Valjevo and Belgrade, but the Serbian counterattack forced them back behind the Sava River, and Stromfeld was tasked with evacuating the Serbian capital. He succeeded in this, and in addition to the orderly withdrawal, he also saved a significant amount of war material, earning him a reputation as a withdrawal expert in the army leadership.

During the 1916 Brusilov Offensive, he again applied the tactic of slow withdrawal, preserving the combat capability of his troops instead of resorting to desperate resistance. After this, his corps was redirected to the Eastern Front, but its staff was left behind during the rail transport, so he had to command the corps alone for two weeks, during which time the corps achieved significant results in the subsequent offensive. The leadership of the unit was taken over by Imre Hadfy, who requested Stromfeld as his chief of staff. With this appointment, he was also promoted to lieutenant colonel.

The corps' crossing of the Dniester River was led by Stromfeld, but due to the delay of other units, they had to retreat behind the river. Despite this, Stromfeld was able to maintain a bridgehead on the other side of the river, where the Battle of Uscieczko began. However, months later, it became clear that there would be no further advance on this sector of the front, so he requested a withdrawal, but the high command refused, citing the need to maintain the appearance of success.

In January 1918, he was transferred to the Italian Front with the XXVI Corps, where he served as chief of staff under the command of Ernst Horsetzky von Hornthal. During this time, he had a brief stay in a Vienna hospital due to tonsillitis, but after his recovery, he continued to serve. He had tunnels dug into the hillside and tried to solve the problem of supplies using cable cars, as the Italian artillery had a clear view of their positions. His troops were able to hold their positions until the collapse. After Emperor Charles' manifesto on October 16, the troops became increasingly discontent, and on the 22nd, two Croatian infantry regiments refused to obey orders. This discontent spread to Stromfeld's sector, and the 29th and 105th Hungarian infantry regiments mutinied. The 26th Croatian infantry regiment soon abandoned the front, and Horsetzky could only send its officers after them, as suggested by Stromfeld.

During the armistice negotiations, the army began to withdraw, and Stromfeld was tasked with organizing this withdrawal. The armistice was signed on November 4, but it only took effect at 3 pm, so several units that had begun to rest were captured by the Italians. He remained in place until November 15, when he led an organized regiment back to the newly independent Hungary.

== During the Hungarian People's Republic ==
On November 19, he arrived in the country. Upon reaching the border, he was asked to disband the regiment that arrived with him. Although he initially resisted and managed to negotiate further travel, he eventually gave in to the request at the next junction. When he arrived in Budapest, he went to the Ministry of War, where he was appointed commander of the Ludovika Academy. Since his service was not due to start for four days, he first traveled to Vienna and brought his wife back to the country.

In December 1918, he was elected chairman of the control committee of the officers' trade union that was established. However, at the end of the year, the government ordered the retirement of officers with a rank higher than lieutenant colonel, which prompted Stromfeld to protest to the Minister of War. Instead of the minister, he only found Vilmos Böhm, the social democratic state secretary, who, due to the petitions submitted by the officers of the Academy, allowed Stromfeld to remain in service. In January 1919, Stromfeld also joined the Social Democratic Party of Hungary.

When Böhm became Minister of War, he appointed Stromfeld as state secretary in charge of army organization. Here, he developed the organization of a 70,000-strong conscript army, but during the five-week recruitment period, only 5,000 people enlisted. Due to the failure, Stromfeld submitted his resignation, but at the request of the party leadership, he remained in his position. On March 20, Böhm summoned him, along with Jenő Tombor, to express his opinion on the Vix Note, which they considered impossible to accept from every point of view.

== During the Hungarian Soviet Republic ==
After the proclamation of the Hungarian Soviet Republic, József Pogány, one of Stromfeld's opponents, was appointed to head the People's Commissariat for War. The first measure of the Commissariat was to abolish military ranks, which shocked the former colonel. As a result, Stromfeld requested his retirement on 27 March and, along with it, moved out of his service apartment into his brother Ferenc's apartment in Győr, where he spent the next three weeks. On 20 April, a soldier visited him at home, delivering a letter from the district commander, requesting that he report to the People's Commissariat. Since a five-member committee had replaced Pogány at the head of the organization, the personnel issue was considered resolved, and they wanted to recall him to active service.

Finally, upon hearing about the Romanian attack, Stromfeld traveled to the capital, where he met with Jenő Tombor, who also urged him to return to service. Stromfeld initially refused, but not long after, on April 21, he accepted the offer. Stromfeld was appointed as the chief of staff of the troops in the Tiszántúl region, alongside Vilmos Böhm, and it was his task to unify and organize the 250-kilometer-long, chaotic frontline. He managed to set up the army command center in Szolnok within a day.

Under his leadership, the army of the Hungarian Soviet Republic attempted to push back the Czechoslovak and Romanian forces that were continuously expanding their territory in Hungary in the spring of 1919. On 9 May, at the beginning of the campaign launched from the Hatvan area, Stromfeld achieved an important victory near Miskolc, which isolated the Czechoslovak forces attacking from the north and the Romanian forces advancing from the east.

After the victory, the Red Army focused on fighting the weaker Czechoslovak forces, and during its northern campaign, it liberated several cities, including Sátoraljaújhely, Érsekújvár, Kassa, and Eperjes. In the latter city, on 16 June, it established the Slovak Soviet Republic. The talented military leader's successes soon provoked protests from the Entente, and in June, French Prime Minister Georges Clemenceau issued a note demanding the withdrawal of the Red Army.

The political leadership of the Hungarian Soviet Republic decided to accept the Entente's offer after the successful campaign in Upper Hungary, and in exchange for promised political, economic, and territorial compensation, it agreed to evacuate the recaptured territories. In protest against the acceptance of the Clemenceau note and the order to withdraw the Red Army, Stromfeld resigned on 3 July 1919. He could not accept the unconditional abandonment of the results of the victorious campaign, which led to the disintegration of the army.

== Last years and his rehabilitation ==
Even in August of the same year, after the fall of the Hungarian Soviet Republic, Stromfeld was arrested. His trial began on 1 July 1920, in which the prosecution charged him with treason and incitement, as it was alleged that he had persuaded many of his fellow officers to join the social democratic party. At the beginning of the trial, Stromfeld stated that he had always been guided by national and patriotic thoughts, and that he had stopped, reorganized, and liberated many areas of the country from the looting army that was pouring in from the front. During his interrogation, Stromfeld declared that he did not feel guilty.

On the second day of the trial, the prosecutor asked Stromfeld if he had understood that his role as chief of staff would not end well. Stromfeld replied that he knew from history that such roles were always ungrateful, but he had trusted himself and worked with a pencil in one hand and a revolver in the other, as he had always been afraid of being eliminated. He said that the army that had defeated the Czechs had not fought for the dictatorship, but as the Hungarian army against the enemies of the country.

During the multi-day trial, witnesses were heard. In his defense speech on 19 July 1920, Stromfeld stated that he had dedicated his entire life to his country and the public. He was not destructive, and by joining the social democracy, he wanted to achieve a better future for his country. He initially rejected the Soviet offer, but later accepted it after long deliberation, believing that it would be beneficial to his country. Since there were enemies at the border, he said, quoting Napoleon, that every patriot's place was in the army, regardless of the system. The Red Army was only a communist army on paper, but in reality, it was the Hungarian army fighting for integrity.

Despite his defense, Stromfeld was sentenced to three years in prison for treason, stripped of his military rank and decorations, and deprived of his pension on 19 July 1920. He was released in 1921. After his release, he worked as a warehouse manager and then as a private clerk, and also participated in the organization of the Social Democratic Party. In 1923, he was detained for half a year on suspicion of being involved in an alleged communist conspiracy, but was later released.

The Hungarian Social Democratic Party (MSZDP) established an organization called the Rendező Gárda (Organization Guard) to ensure the security of party events, and Stromfeld was its leader. From 1925, he was a member of the illegal Communist Party of Hungary. He maintained his connection with the MSZDP and the illegal communist party until the end of his life. In 1930, Stromfeld's widow was granted a pension equal to that of a colonel by the state president, at the request of Defense Minister Gyula Gömbös. In 1945, Stromfeld was posthumously promoted to the rank of colonel general.

Although Stromfeld had regained his freedom by 1923, he did not live to see his rehabilitation as an officer in 1945. The real tragedy of Stromfeld's life was that, despite being a rare talent as an educator, military leader, and army organizer, his achievements and efforts for the country were considered political acts and condemned by the Horthy regime, according to the laws of the time. Stromfeld died in October 1927, at the age of 50.

== Honors ==
- Postage stamp issued by during the Hungarian People's Republic in his honor on 28 September 1952.

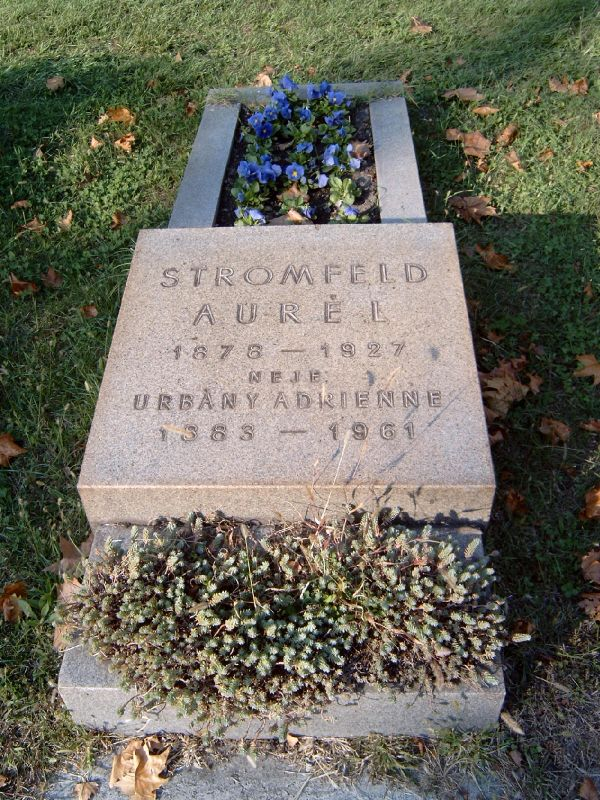
Tomb of Stromfeld in Budapest
