= Ferenc Juhász =

Ferenc Juhász is the name of:

- Ferenc Juhász (poet) (1928–2015), Hungarian poet
- Ferenc Juhász (politician) (born 1960), Minister of Defense for Hungary, 2002–2006
