= Sándor Belitska =

Hungarian politician

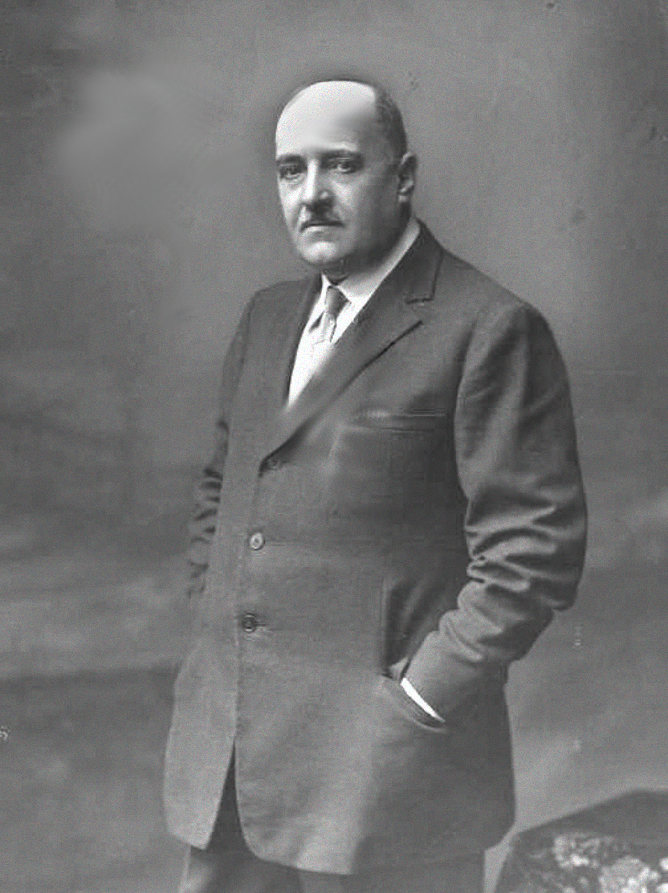
- Sándor Belitska
- Born: Sándor Belitska; 1 April 1872; Lajosfalva, Kingdom of Hungary, Austria-Hungary
- Died: 7 December 1939 (aged 67); Budapest, Kingdom of Hungary
- Military career
- Allegiance: Austria-Hungary (Kingdom of Hungary) Hungary
- Service years: 1890–1923
- Rank: Lieutenant General
- Conflicts: World War I

Sándor Belitska (sometimes called Alexander Belitska; Ľudovítová 1 April 1872 – 7 December 1939) was a Hungarian military officer and politician, who served as Minister of Defence between 1920 and 1923. During the World War I he fought on the Eastern Front. After the war he lived as a nobleman, he was a member of the National Casino and vice-chairman of the Royal Hungarian Car Club, leader of the Dove-shooter Association and Director of the Sports Club of Margitsziget.

Political offices
Preceded by István Sréter	Minister of Defence; 1920–1923	Succeeded by Károly Csáky
Military offices
Preceded by Karl von Bardolf	Chief of Staff, k.u.k. 2nd Army; 1918	Succeeded by Post abolished
