= CIA activities in Hungary =

The Central Intelligence Agency's involvement in Hungary from 1950 to 1957 and again in 1989 consisted of clandestine intelligence collection, gray psychological operations, and counterintelligence activities. As noted in the book Broadcasting Freedom: The Cold War Triumph of Radio Free Europe and Radio Liberty, an organization called Radio Free Europe (RFE), was funded at the time by the CIA to broadcast Hungary from at least from 1950 to 1956. However, RFE operated on no directives to foment revolution.

== Gray psychological operations ==
=== Hungary 1956 ===
==== Clandestine intelligence collection ====
CIA had one officer, Geza Katona, in Hungary from 1950 to 1957 period, and for several years that person spent "95 percent" of his time on "cover duties." "He mailed letters, purchased stamps and stationery ...," among other "support tasks," the history noted. At the time of the Revolution in fall 1956, he was preoccupied with official contacts, maintaining diplomatic cover, and doing interviews with Hungarian visitors.

CIA was completely surprised by the Hungarian Revolution of 1956. A CIA Clandestine Service (CS) report of the events, written in 1958, said "This breath-taking and undreamed-of state of affairs not only caught many Hungarians off-guard, it also caught us off-guard, for which we can hardly be blamed since we had no inside information, little outside information, and could not read the Russians' minds."

After the revolt broke out, Katona asked for policy guidance regarding arms and ammunition. On October 28, Headquarters responded, "we must restrict ourselves to information collection only [and] not get involved in anything that would reveal U.S. interest or give cause to claim intervention...it was not permitted to send U.S. weapons in." In fact, the implication in the histories is that transferring arms was never seriously contemplated: "At this date no one had checked precisely on the exact location and nature of U.S. or other weapons available to CIA. This was done finally in early December" of 1956.

Did a US-sponsored group play a part in the revolution? From the CS Histories, they did not. "Small psychological warfare and paramilitary units came into being in the early 1950s, (including the Hungarian National Council headed by Bela Varga), and occasional reconnaissance missions took place at that time, the prospects for penetrating into Hungary deteriorated by 1953 when stepped up controls by Hungarian security forces and `the meager talent available' among potential agents made cross-border operations essentially untenable."

CS historians observe "The authors sarcastically write that `If we [the CIA] were in no position to act efficiently... the military is, was, and always will be even worse off.' ... in the future the CIA [should] keep the military `at arm's length' and only do what's necessary `to keep them happy.'"

"Moscow was also taken by surprise by the Revolution despite the thousands of Soviet soldiers, KGB officers, and Party informants present in Hungary. Rather than understanding the sources of the discontent, it was easier for Soviet operatives and even the leadership to cast woefully misdirected blame on the CIA for the unrest. Kliment Voroshilov remarked at the October 28 Presidium session: `The American Secret Services are more active in Hungary than Comrades Suslov and Mikoyan are,' referring to the two Party leaders sent to Budapest to negotiate a modus vivendi with the new Nagy government. At that moment, the two Soviet Presidium had more active members in Budapest outnumbering the single CIA case officer there."

After a few days of independence, the Soviet Union moved in with massive force, crushed the revolution, and later executed the Communist but rebel head of government, Imre Nagy, and the head of the military, Pal Maleter.

==== Gray psychological operations ====
In contradiction to the above account, Weiner's book asserts that during the Hungarian Revolution of 1956:

- There was a massive increase in CIA-controlled Radio Free Europe broadcasts directed toward Hungary, supporting the revolutionaries, encouraging violent resistance against the occupying Soviet troops.
- Radio Free Europe attacked Imre Nagy, the head of the National Government brought to power by the revolution, as a Soviet ally and favored Cardinal József Mindszenty as the new leader of Hungary.
- The CIA amplified and rebroadcast low-wattage radio transmissions from Hungarian fighters back into Hungary.

The CIA disputes this account, stating in a review of Weiner's book that

"There is sloppy scholarship at the very least in the recounting of the 1956 Hungarian Revolution, which in Weiner’s hands becomes a tragicomedy, with Frank Wisner ordering Radio Free Europe (RFE) to incite violence against the communist regime and against invading Soviet troops—only to see the uprising crushed. One of Weiner’s major sources for his assertion of CIA’s culpability is an RFE New York memo, allegedly the result of Wisner’s “exhortations” to violence, telling the radio’s Hungarian staff in Munich that “All restraints have gone off. No holds barred.” It’s a significant problem for Weiner’s thesis that Wisner in 1956 actually had no direct involvement in RFE and that the memo was produced after the uprising was effectively over and dealt with rhetoric, not violence.

"Weiner also points to an RFE broadcast that predicted the United States would come to the aid of Hungarian freedom fighters, without acknowledging that the broadcaster was doing a press review after the Soviet invasion and was quoting—by name—a London Observer editorial, and that even so this was a violation of RFE policy, or that this was the sole example of an implicit hint of assistance in two weeks of continuous broadcasting to Hungary. The idea that RFE was fomenting violence at the behest of Frank Wisner is not supported either by Weiner’s sources or by other sources he failed to cite."

=== Hungary 1989 ===
==== Counterintelligence ====
Edward Lee Howard, one of the most damaging CIA defectors, was expelled from Hungary at US request. Howard, a fugitive from the FBI, was expelled over protests by the KGB. "We asked them to expel him and they did it," said a United States official. "There was no quid pro quo."

Director of Central Intelligence William Webster said, in a speech at the National Press Club about changes in relations between the US and Eastern Europe, "I can think of one instance, and I'll not mention a name because it may be classified, in which a prominent defector from the United States was finally permanently expelled from a bloc country which had provided him comfort and sanctuary. And that would have been contrary to the wishes of the K.G.B. So we are seeing some indications of independence."
