= Czinege =

Czinege is a surname. Notable people with the surname include:

- Juraj Czinege (born 1977), Slovak footballer
- Lajos Czinege (1924–1998), Hungarian military officer and politician
