= György Keleti =

Hungarian politician (1946–2020)

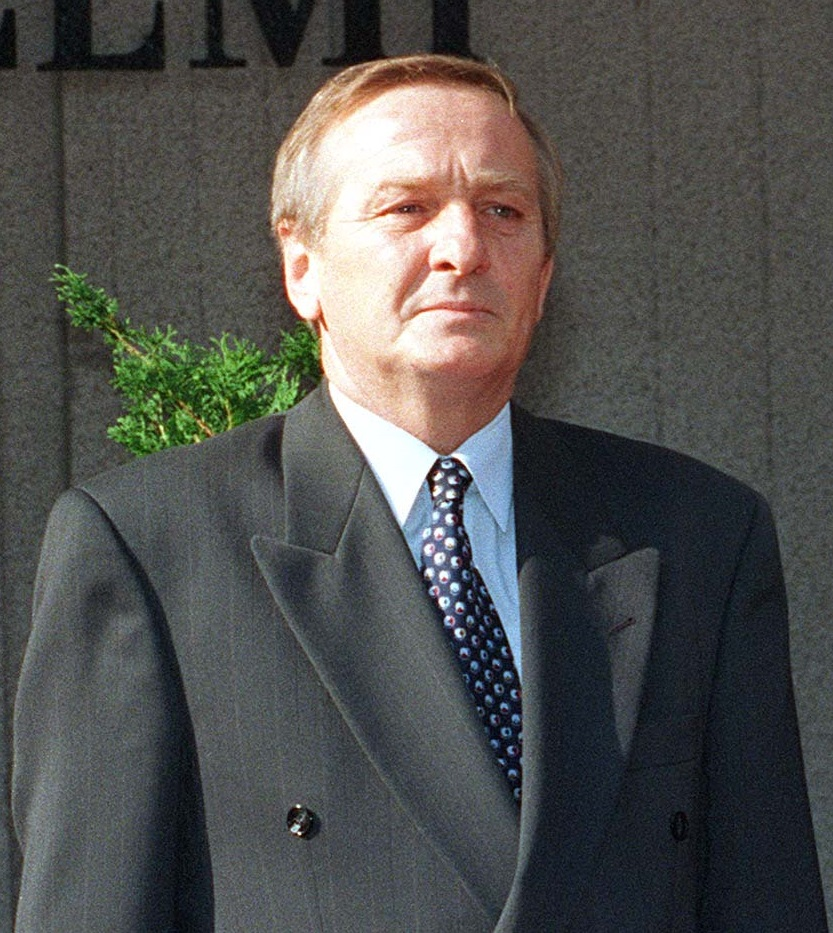

Minister of Defence of Hungary
- In office 15 July 1994 – 8 July 1998
- Prime Minister: Gyula Horn
- Preceded by: Lajos Für
- Succeeded by: János Szabó

Personal details
- Born: 18 May 1946 Lučenec, Czechoslovakia
- Died: 13 September 2020 (aged 74)
- Party: MSZMP, MSZP
- Spouse: Erzsébet Petrik
- Children: Andrea; Györgyi; Katalin
- Profession: politician

György Keleti (18 May 1946 – 13 September 2020) was a Hungarian politician, who served as Minister of Defence between 1994 and 1998.

== Personal life ==
He had been married since 1973. His wife was Erzsébet Petrik. They had three daughters, Andrea, Györgyi and Katalin.

György Keleti died on 13 September 2020 after a long illness, at the age of 74.

Political offices
Preceded by Lajos Für	Minister of Defence; 1994–1998	Succeeded by János Szabó
