= János Szabó (Minister of Defence) =

Hungarian politician

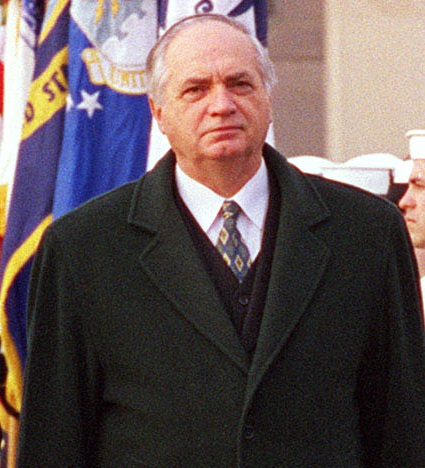

Minister of Defence of Hungary
- In office 8 July 1998 – 27 May 2002
- Prime Minister: Viktor Orbán
- Preceded by: György Keleti
- Succeeded by: Ferenc Juhász

Personal details
- Born: 1 June 1941 (age 84) Füzesabony, Hungary
- Party: FKGP
- Profession: politician

János Szabó (born 1 June 1941 in Füzesabony) is a Hungarian politician, who served as Minister of Defence between 1998 and 2002.

In 1965, he graduated from the Faculty of Law of the Eötvös Loránd University.

Political offices
Preceded by György Keleti	Minister of Defence; 1998–2002	Succeeded by Ferenc Juhász
