= Géza Révész =

Hungarian military officer and politician

- Born: 31 August 1902; Sátoraljaújhely, Zemplén County, Kingdom of Hungary
- Died: 22 January 1977 (aged 74); Budapest, Hungary
- Military career
- Allegiance: Soviet Union (1924–1947); Hungarian People's Republic (1947–1960)
- Branch: Red Army (1924–1947); Hungarian People's Army (1947–1960)
- Rank: Lieutenant General
- Conflicts: World War II

Géza Révész (31 August 1902 – 22 January 1977) was a Hungarian military officer and politician, who served as Minister of Defence between 1957 and 1960. During the Hungarian Soviet Republic and the Second World War he fought in the Red Army. From 1960 to 1963 he was the Hungarian ambassador to the Soviet Union.

== Biography ==
From the age of 13, he trained as a silversmith. He was a member of the Hungarian Communist Party from its founding on November 24, 1918. As a young man, he fought in the Hungarian Red Army. After the defeat of the Hungarian Soviet Republic, he fled to Austria, and from there, he moved to Czechoslovakia. He then returned to work on the underground organization of the Hungarian Komsomol.

In 1922, he was arrested and sentenced to 10 years in prison on May 12, 1923. In March 1924, he left for the Soviet Union under a prisoner exchange agreement with the USSR. He received a technical education and worked as a military engineer, becoming an officer in the Soviet Red Army. During World War II, he initially worked in the rear in Chelyabinsk, then headed a partisan school in Kiev and, as part of the Red Army, fought in the liberation of Hungary.

With the establishment of the Hungarian People's Republic, he entered government service. From 1947 to 1948, he served as Hungary's ambassador to Poland. He then worked in the Ministry of Defense. After the suppression of the Hungarian Uprising of 1956, he served as Minister of Defense of Hungary from 1957 to 1960. Then, from 1960 to 1963, he served as Hungary's ambassador to the Soviet Union.

From 1967 until his death, he headed the Hungarian-Soviet Friendship Society. From 1969, he also served as Chairman of the Central People's Control Committee.

Political offices
Preceded by Ferenc Münnich	Minister of Defence; 1957–1960	Succeeded by Lajos Czinege
