= Ferenc Münnich =

Hungarian politician (1886–1967)

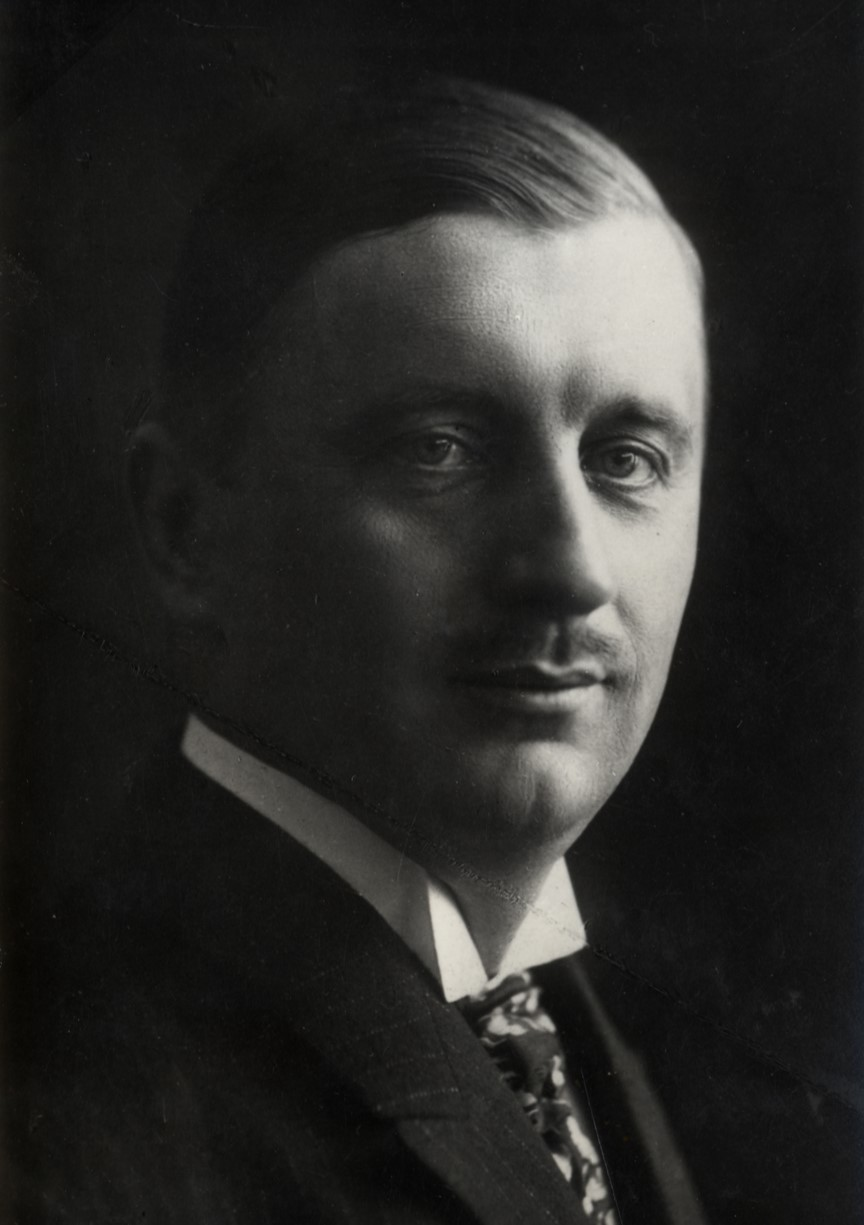
- Münnich in 1921

Chairman of the Council of Ministers of the People's Republic of Hungary
- In office 28 January 1958 – 13 September 1961
- Chairman of the Presidency: István Dobi
- Preceded by: János Kádár
- Succeeded by: János Kádár

Minister of Defence
- In office 12 November 1956 – 1 March 1957
- Prime Minister: János Kádár
- Preceded by: Pál Maléter
- Succeeded by: Géza Révész

Minister of the Interior
- In office 27 October 1956 – 3 November 1956
- Prime Minister: Imre Nagy
- Preceded by: László Piros
- Succeeded by: Béla Biszku

Personal details
- Born: 18 November 1886 Seregélyes, Austria-Hungary
- Died: 29 November 1967 (aged 81) Budapest, Hungary
- Party: Hungarian Communist Party, Hungarian Working People's Party, Hungarian Socialist Workers' Party

Ferenc Münnich (Note: Hungarian pronunciation: [ˈfɛrɛnt͡s ˈmynnih]) (18 November 1886 – 29 November 1967) was a Hungarian Communist politician who served as Chairman of the Council of Ministers of the People's Republic of Hungary from 1958 to 1961.

Of German descent, he served in the Austro-Hungarian Army in World War I, and fought in the Eastern front, stationed at Sighetu Marmației, where he received a decoration for bravery and was promoted to a major. His unit was captured in October 1915 and were deported to a prisoner of war camp in Tomsk, Siberia. While in Tomsk, Münnich joined the Communist Party of the Soviet Union, then served as a commander of an international POW unit fighting for the Bolsheviks. In 1918 he became a regimental commander, but returned to Hungary in September 1918 to help form the Hungarian Communist Party. Ferenc headed the Organization Department of the War Commissariat for the Hungarian Soviet Republic, and then became a war commissar for the Slovak Soviet Republic. After the dissolution of the HSR, he joined Béla Kun's faction and participated in the March Action in the Weimar Republic, which led to his arrest and deportation back to Hungary. Münnich resided in the Soviet Union from 1922-1936, and joined the board of the Hammer and Sickle magazine (Sarló és Kalapács (folyóirat)), also serving as the editor from 1931-1933.

Ferenc fought in the Spanish Civil War and was commissar of Rakosi Battalion of XIII International Brigade. He later served in World War II as a partisan training officer and fought in the Battle of Stalingrad. Münnich served as head of the Hungarian Department of Radio Moscow before returning to Hungary in 1945, where he served as the chief of police in Budapest. From 1949 to 1956 he held diplomatic posts in Helsinki, Sofia, Moscow, and Belgrade, also serving as a member of parliament in Hungary from 1949 to 1953. He joined János Kádár in the CPSU Presidium meetings in Moscow in 1956 and was a key member of the Hungarian Socialist Workers' Party. After the Hungarian Revolution of 1956 Ferenc served as the minister for the armed forces and public security, and then as the Prime Minister from 1958 to 1961. He served as a state minister from 1961 to 1965, member of the Central Committee from 1956 to 1967.

Münnich died at 81 on 29 November 1967 in Budapest.

Political offices
Preceded by László Piros	Minister of the Interior; 1956	Succeeded by Béla Biszku
Preceded by Pál Maléter	Minister of Defence; 1956–1957	Succeeded by Géza Révész
Preceded by János Kádár	Prime Minister of Hungary; 1958–1961	Succeeded by János Kádár
