= Zoltán Szabó (Minister of Defence) =

Hungarian politician and military officer

Minister of Defence of the Counter-Revolutionary Government
- In office 5 May 1919 – 31 May 1919
- Preceded by: József Haubrich
- Succeeded by: Miklós Horthy

Personal details
- Born: 18 July 1858 Kebeleszentmárton, Kingdom of Hungary
- Died: 3 November 1934 (aged 76) Arad, Kingdom of Romania
- Profession: politician

Zoltán Szabó de Kisjolsva (18 July 1858 – 3 November 1934) was a Hungarian politician and military officer, who served as Minister of Defence in the counter-revolutionary government against the Hungarian Soviet Republic.

== Career ==
Szabó attended Theresian Military Academy since 1875 finished his military studies on 24 April 1879. He participated in the World War I as commander of several infantry units. He was promoted to major-general and appointed commander of the 216th Infantry Brigade of the Royal Hungarian Honvéd, one of the armed forces of Austria-Hungary, on 18 May 1918. His infantry stationed near Slatina, Caracal and Corabia in Oltenia, Southern Romania as part of the Austro-Hungarian and German occupation force after August 1918. A month later, the infantry had been withdrawn into Eastern Transylvania.

After the Aster Revolution on 31 October 1918, newly installed prime minister Mihály Károlyi appointed Zoltán Szabó as military commander of Transylvania. Following the establishment of the Hungarian Soviet Republic, Szabó, as Minister of Defence, became a member of the counter-revolutionary government in Arad led by Prime Minister Gyula Károlyi. When the rival government moved to Szeged on 30 May 1919, the Romanian authorities intercepted Szabó, who was unable to join the fellow ministers. Szabó was replaced by Miklós Horthy on 6 June 1919. Szabó was interned to Craiova by the Romanian army leadership.

Following the Hungarian-Romanian War of 1919, Szabó stayed in Romania. Later he became Chairman of the Board of the Central Savings Bank of Arad.

== Family ==
Zoltán Szabó married Hajnalka Tagányi, a daughter of Baron Sándor Tagányi, a Member of Parliament. During their wedding, Baron Tagányi donated Pálosbaracka estate to her daughter as a wedding gift.

== Sources ==
- Rubicon 2010/06
- Három évtized története életrajzokban. Szerk. Gellért Imre és Madarász Elemér. Bp., Európa Irodalmi és Nyomdai Rt., [1932].
- Magyar politikai lexikon. Szerk. Madarász Elemér. Bp., Magyar Politikai Lexikon Kiadóvállalat, 1935.
- Új magyar életrajzi lexikon. Főszerk. Markó László. Bp., Magyar Könyvklub

Political offices
Preceded by József Haubrich	Minister of War of the Counter-Government; 1919	Succeeded by Miklós Horthy
