= Dezső Kolossváry =

Hungarian military officer and politician

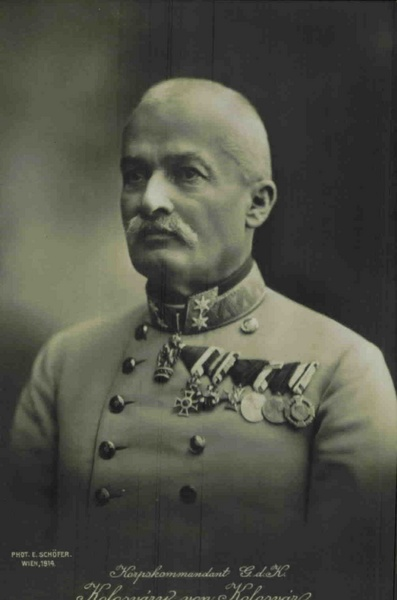
- Born: 1 May 1854; Veszprém, Kingdom of Hungary, Austrian Empire
- Died: 5 April 1919 (aged 64); Sopron, Hungary
- Military career
- Allegiance: Austria-Hungary
- Rank: Major General
- Commands: Tenth Cavalry Regiment, Second Brigade of Tarnów; Second Cavalry Regiment, Fourteenth Cavalry Brigade; Evidenzbureau (military intelligence); Thirtieth Infantry Division; Eleventh Army Corps

Dezső Kolossváry de Kolosvár (or Desiderius Kolossváry de Kolosvar) (1 May 1854 – 5 April 1919) was a Hungarian military officer in the Austro-Hungarian service and (briefly) a politician.

== Biography ==
He was born in Veszprém on 1 May 1854. His father was Joseph Kolossváry, a lawyer and landowner, his mother was Carolina Nedeczky.

He enrolled at the military academy in Vienna, graduating in 1876 and serving as a lieutenant in the 10th Hussars regiment.

In 1881 he was assigned to the General Staff, and promoted to captain in 1884 and to major in 1891.

In 1896 he became a lieutenant colonel (full colonel in May 1897) and was the director of the Evidenzbureau (Austro-Hungarian military intelligence) between 1896 and 1898. This was followed in May 1898 by appointment as chief of the Operations Bureau (Bureaus für operative Generalstabsarbeiten).

In 1901 Kolossváry left the Austro-Hungarian General Staff and moved to the Royal Hungarian Honvéd, the Territorial Army based in his native Hungary, in which he took command of the 2nd Cavalry Brigade. In May 1903 he was promoted to the rank of major general. However, only a month later, in June of the same year, he accepted the position of Hungary's Minister of Defence in the short-lived, crisis-ridden cabinet headed by Khuen-Héderváry between June and November 1903. Part of the crisis, left unresolved when Kolossváry's short foray into politics ended, concerned a controversial conscription bill.

Kolossváry's successor as defence minister, Major General Sándor Nyiry, agreed to let him return to active military service. In 1904 he commanded the 14th Cavalry Brigade in Rzeszów. In August 1906 he commanded a division located in Stanislav (now Ivano-Frankivsk).

The remaining years of Kolossváry's military career were spent in the environs of Lemberg (Lviv), the chief city of Galicia. In November 1907 he was promoted to lieutenant-general and appointed to command of the 30th Infantry Division based in Lemberg. On 31 October 1912 he advanced to command of the 11th Army Corps in the same area.

As such, Kolossváry took part in the Battle of Galicia in the early stages of the First World War, subordinate to Rudolf von Brudermann, who led the Austria-Hungarian 3rd army. Following the disastrous Austria-Hungarian defeat in that battle, and specifically the loss of Lemberg to the Russians, Kolossváry was in September 1914 removed from command of the 11th Army Corps. He got no further appointment, going on an indefinite leave of absence on 1 February 1915, and having no further part in the war.

He died on 5 April 1919 at the age of 65, in Sopron.

Political offices
Preceded by Géza Fejérváry	Minister of Defence; 1903	Succeeded by Sándor Nyiri
