= Jenő Tombor =

Hungarian military officer and politician

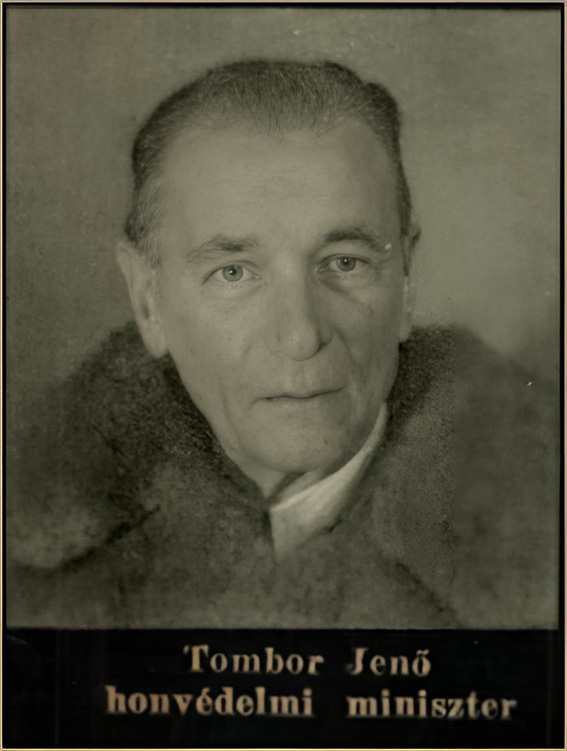
- Tombor in 1945
- Born: 3 March 1880; Nyitra, Kingdom of Hungary
- Died: 25 July 1946 (aged 66); Budapest, Hungary
- Military career
- Allegiance: Austria-Hungary
- Rank: Colonel General
- Conflicts: World War I

Jenő Tombor (3 March 1880 – 25 July 1946) was a Hungarian military officer and politician, who served as Minister of Defence from 1945 until his death. During the Hungarian Soviet Republic he planned a successful campaign against the rebel Czechoslovaks with Aurél Stromfeld.

Political offices
Preceded by János Vörös	Minister of Defence; 1945–1946	Succeeded by Ferenc Nagy
