= Sándor Nyiri =

Hungarian military officer (1854–1911)

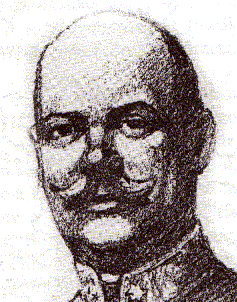
- Born: 17 November 1854; Székely, Kingdom of Hungary
- Died: 5 May 1911 (aged 56); Vienna, Austria-Hungary
- Military career
- Allegiance: Austria-Hungary
- Service years: 1874–1911
- Rank: Lieutenant General
- Commands: Home Defence Regiment of Debrecen, Twenty-fifth Infantry Division, Hungarian Royal Guard

Sándor Nyiri (sometimes spelled Nyiry)(17 November 1854 – 5 May 1911) was a Hungarian military officer and politician who served as Minister of Defence of Hungary between 1903 and 1905. From 1899 he was the commander of the Ludoviceum. In 1905 he won a mandate to the House of Representatives as a politician of the Liberal Party. On 19 February 1906 he dissolved the Hungarian Assembly with the police forces quasi the Constitutional Crisis of 1905's closing act.

Political offices
Preceded by Dezső Kolossváry	Minister of Defence; 1903–1905	Succeeded by Ferenc Bihar
