= József Haubrich =

Hungarian politician

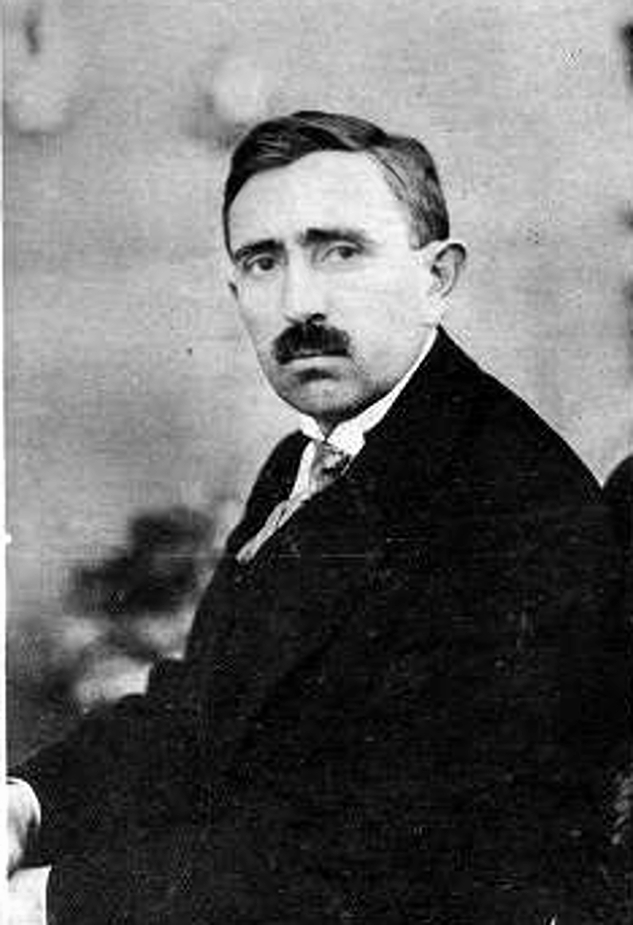

Minister of Defence of Hungary
- In office 21 March 1919 – 24 June 1919
- Preceded by: Vilmos Böhm
- Succeeded by: Vilmos Böhm
- In office 1 August 1919 – 6 August 1919
- Preceded by: Vilmos Böhm
- Succeeded by: Ferenc Schnetzer

Personal details
- Born: 9 November 1883 Detta, Austria-Hungary
- Died: 1939 Moscow, Soviet Union
- Party: MSZDP
- Profession: politician, soldier

József Haubrich (9 November 1883, Detta – 1939) was a Hungarian politician, who served as Minister of Defence twice in 1919. He was one of the leaders of the Hungarian Social Democratic Party. During the Hungarian Soviet Republic he was a member of the communist cabinet, military commander of Budapest. After the fall of the communists, he was sentenced to death by the Regency. As part of the Soviet-Hungarian prisoner exchange, he was taken to the Soviet Union, where he spent the rest of his life working as a steelworker. On February 27, 1938, he was arrested on charges of espionage, sentenced to death on May 8, 1938, and the sentence was carried out on June 8, 1938. He was rehabilitated on October 17, 1956.

Political offices
Preceded by Vilmos Böhm	People's Commissar of War in opposition: Zoltán Szabó and Miklós Horthy; 1919	Succeeded by Vilmos Böhm
Preceded by Vilmos Böhm	Minister of War; 1919	Succeeded by Ferenc Schnetzer
