= Ferenc Kárpáti =

Hungarian military officer and politician

- Born: 16 October 1926; Putnok, Hungary
- Died: 27 September 2013 (aged 86); Budapest, Hungary
- Military career
- Allegiance: Hungarian People's Republic
- Branch: Hungarian People's Army
- Rank: Lieutenant General

Ferenc Kárpáti (16 October 1926 – 27 September 2013) was a Hungarian military officer and politician. Kárpáti was born in Putnok. He served as Minister of Defence between 1985 and 1990. He died in Budapest.

== Early life and career ==
He was born in 1926 into a working-class family with five children. From 1945 he was the district secretary of the Hungarian Democratic Youth Union in Borsod County, then a member of the county party committee. He joined the army in 1948. In February 1949 – after a 3-month course – he became a professional officer with the rank of lieutenant, initially serving at the Honvéd Kossuth Academy and then at the Honvéd Dózsa Infantry Officer School in Pécs. Between 1951 and 1953 he studied at the artillery department of the Military-Political Academy, then was promoted to the rank of major. Between 1953 and 1955 he served in a brigade as the political deputy to the commander. In 1955, he began postgraduate studies at the Lenin Military-Political Academy in Moscow, but he abandoned them upon news of the Hungarian revolution and returned home at the end of October. From December 1956, he served in the Ministry of Defense, and from March 1957, he was head of department at the Zrínyi Miklós Military Academy.

== Early political career ==
Between 1958 and 1970, he was the first secretary of the People's Army Committee of the Hungarian Socialist Workers' Party. Between 1962 and 1966, he was an alternate member of the Central Committee of the Hungarian Socialist Workers ' Party, and until 1985, he was a member of the Central Control Committee (KEB). He held the position of Chief of the Political Group of the Hungarian People's Army between 19 December 1970 and 30 December 1985, and was also Deputy Minister of Defense. He became a colonel in 1963, a major general in 1971, and a lieutenant general in 1979. From 1971 to 1990, he was a member of Parliament, first in the Szob constituency and then in the Cegléd constituency. The Presidential Council of the Hungarian People's Republic elected him Minister of Defense on 30 December 1985, and also appointed him Colonel General.

== Minister of Defence ==
During his ministry, the military doctrine was modified in accordance with the defense concept, and a significant reduction in forces – approximately 35%. He renamed the People's Army to the Hungarian Defence Forces again on 15 March 1990. On 15 December 1989, President Mátyás Szűrös placed Ferenc Kárpáti in the "military reserve" and thus headed the defence portfolio as a civilian minister. He became the fourth "civilian" defence minister in the past half century. From 2 May 1990, following the resignation of the Németh government, he headed the ministry as acting minister. He retired on 1 June 1990, at the age of 64.

== Death ==
He died on 27 September 2013, after a long illness, at the Hungarian Defence Forces Health Center's Defence Hospital in Budapest, where he was being treated.

== Awards and recognitions ==
- Honorary citizen of the city of Cegléd (1983)

Political offices
Preceded by István Oláh	Minister of Defence; 1985–1990	Succeeded by Lajos Für
