= Ferenc Bihar =

Hungarian military officer and politician

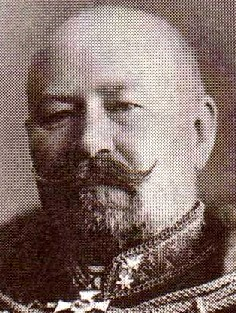
- Born: 20 December 1847; Debrecen, Kingdom of Hungary, Austrian Empire
- Died: 17 May 1920 (aged 72); Budapest, Hungary
- Military career
- Allegiance: Austria-Hungary
- Service years: 1870–1906
- Rank: Lieutenant General
- Commands: Twenty-ninth Home Defence Battalion

Ferenc Bihar de Barabásszeg (20 December 1847 – 17 May 1920) was a Hungarian military officer and politician, who served as Minister of Defence between 1905 and 1906, during the Hungarian Constitutional Crisis of 1905. After the fall of the cabinet of Géza Fejérváry he retired.

Political offices
Preceded by Sándor Nyiri	Minister of Defence; 1905–1906	Succeeded by Béla Pap
