= István Oláh =

Hungarian military officer and politician

Minister of Defence of Hungary
- In office 6 December 1984 – 15 December 1985
- President: János Kádár
- Preceded by: Lajos Czinege
- Succeeded by: Ferenc Kárpáti

Personal details
- Born: 16 December 1926 Nádudvar, Hungary
- Died: 15 December 1985 (aged 58) Budapest, Hungary
- Party: Hungarian Socialist Workers' Party

Military service
- Allegiance: Hungarian People's Republic
- Branch/service: Hungarian People's Army
- Years of service: 1945–1985
- Rank: Army General

István Oláh (16 December 1926 – 15 December 1985) was a Hungarian military officer and politician, who served as Minister of Defence from 1984 until his death.

== Biography ==
In 1945, he became a volunteer in the Hungarian People's Army. That same year he joined the Communist Party. In 1949 he graduated from the Kossuth Military Academy. In 1964, he studied at the Voroshilov Soviet Higher Military Academy. From 1966 to 1973, he rose through the ranks of the Hungarian People's Army. He had been serving as a Deputy Minister of Defense of the Hungarian People's Army since 1966. In 1975, he was made a permanent member of the Central Committee of the Hungarian Socialist Workers Party. He was the Minister of Defense after the removal of Lajos Czinege.

== Death ==
Oláh died on 15 December 1985, a day before his 59th birthday. He was buried in Kerepesi Cemetery. Conspiracy theories about his death arose has his death occurred at a time when the defense ministers of the Soviet Union, Czechoslovakia and East Germany had also died within the same year. It gave rise to assumptions by the media about a specially held action by the Western special services to eliminate the supporters of a forceful solution to the 1981 Polish hunger demonstrations.

Political offices
Preceded by Lajos Czinege	Minister of Defence; 1984–1985	Succeeded by Ferenc Kárpáti
