= Minister of Defence (Hungary) =

Minister of Defence of Hungary
- Magyarország honvédelmi minisztere
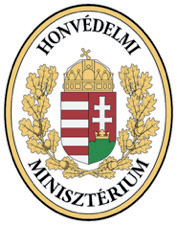

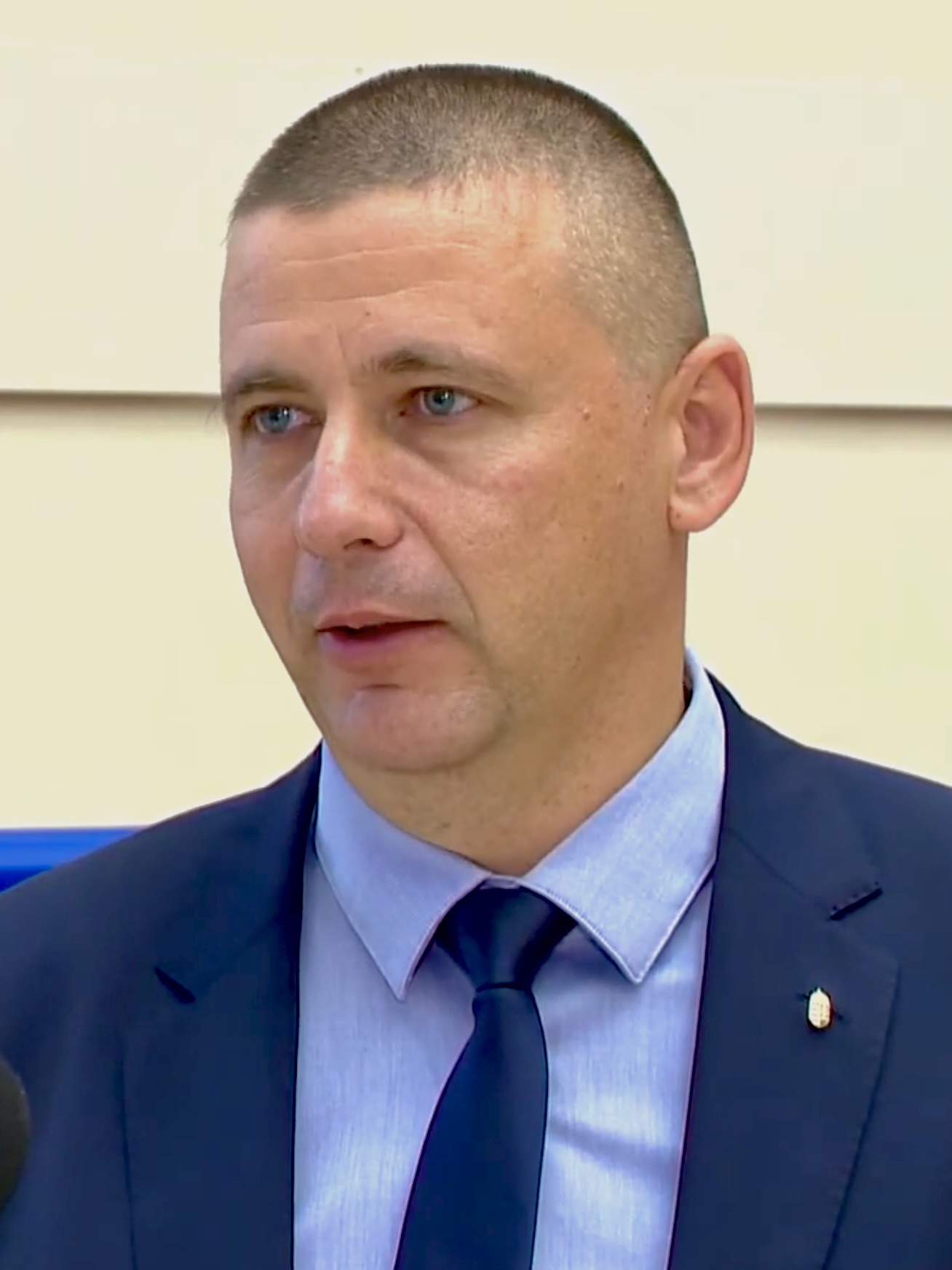
- Incumbent; Romulusz Ruszin-Szendi since 9 May 2026
- Ministry of Defence
- Type: Minister
- Member of: Government of Hungary
- Formation: 7 April 1848
- First holder: Lajos Batthyány
- Website: Official website

The minister of defence of Hungary (Hungarian: Magyarország honvédelmi minisztere) is a member of the Government of Hungary and the head of the Ministry of Defence. The defence minister appoints the Chief of General Staff of the Hungarian Defence Forces. The current defence minister is Romulusz Ruszin-Szendi.

The position was called People's Commissar of War (Hungarian: hadügyi népbiztos) during the Hungarian Soviet Republic in 1919 and Minister of War (Hungarian: hadügyminiszter) during two short periods of Hungarian history: at the time of the Hungarian Revolution of 1848 and during a very short chaotic term (less than two years) after World War I, when three political transformations took place.

== Ministers of War (1848–1849) ==
=== Hungarian Kingdom (1848–1849) ===
Parties Opposition Party Peace Party Military

No.	Portrait	Name (Birth–Death)	Term of office		Political party	Cabinet	Assembly (Election)
—		Lajos Batthyány (1807–1849) acting	7 April 1848	23 May 1848	Opposition Party	Batthyány	Last Diet
1		Lázár Mészáros (1796–1858)	23 May 1848	2 October 1848	Military	Batthyány	Last Diet
1		Lázár Mészáros (1796–1858)	23 May 1848	2 October 1848	Military	Batthyány	1 (1848)
(1)		Lázár Mészáros (1796–1858)	2 October 1848	14 April 1849	Peace Party	Committee of National Defence	1 (1848)

=== Hungarian State (1849) ===
Parties Peace Party Military

No.	Portrait	Name (Birth–Death)	Term of office		Political party	Cabinet	Assembly (Election)
(1)		Lázár Mészáros (1796–1858) acting	14 April 1849	1 May 1849	Peace Party	Committee of National Defence	1 (1848)
(1)		Lázár Mészáros (1796–1858) acting	1 May 1849	6 May 1849	Peace Party	Szemere	1 (1848)
2		Artúr Görgei (1818–1916)	7 May 1849	7 July 1849	Military	Szemere	1 (1848)
3		Lajos Aulich (1793–1849)	14 July 1849	11 August 1849	Military	Szemere	1 (1848)

After the collapse of the Hungarian Revolution of 1848, the Hungarian Kingdom became an integral part of the Austrian Empire until 1867, when dual Austro-Hungarian Monarchy was created.

== Ministers of Defence (1867–1918) ==
From 1867 to 1918 there was a Honvédministerium responsible for the military of the Hungarian half of Austria-Hungary and a Ministry of Defence for the military of the Austrian half, along with a Ministry of War with responsibility for Austria-Hungary as a whole.

=== Hungarian Kingdom (1867–1918) ===
Parties Deák Party/Liberal Party/National Party of Work National Constitution Party FÜG48–Károlyi Independent

No.	Portrait	Name (Birth–Death)	Term of office		Political party	Cabinet	Assembly (Election)
1		Gyula Andrássy (1823–1890)	17 February 1867	14 November 1871	Deák Party	Andrássy; DP	3 (1865)
1		Gyula Andrássy (1823–1890)	17 February 1867	14 November 1871	Deák Party	Andrássy; DP	4 (1869)
2		Menyhért Lónyay (1822–1884)	14 November 1871	4 December 1872	Deák Party	Lónyay; DP	4 (1869)
2		Menyhért Lónyay (1822–1884)	14 November 1871	4 December 1872	Deák Party	Lónyay; DP	5 (1872)
3		József Szlávy (1818–1900) acting	4 December 1872	15 December 1872	Deák Party	Szlávy; DP	5 (1872)
4		Béla Szende (1823–1882)	15 December 1872	21 March 1874	Independent	Szlávy; DP	5 (1872)
4		Béla Szende (1823–1882)	21 March 1874	2 March 1875	Independent	Bittó; DP–BK	5 (1872)
4		Béla Szende (1823–1882)	2 March 1875	20 October 1875	Independent	Wenckheim; SZP	5 (1872)
4		Béla Szende (1823–1882)	20 October 1875	18 August 1882 (died in office)	Independent	K. Tisza; SZP	6 (1875)
4		Béla Szende (1823–1882)	20 October 1875	18 August 1882 (died in office)	Independent	K. Tisza; SZP	7 (1878)
4		Béla Szende (1823–1882)	20 October 1875	18 August 1882 (died in office)	Independent	K. Tisza; SZP	8 (1881)
5		Gedeon Ráday (1841–1883)	19 August 1882	26 December 1883 (died in office)	Liberal Party	K. Tisza; SZP	8 (1881)
—		Béla Orczy (1822–1917) acting	2 January 1884	28 October 1884	Liberal Party	K. Tisza; SZP	8 (1881)
—		Béla Orczy (1822–1917) acting	2 January 1884	28 October 1884	Liberal Party	K. Tisza; SZP	9 (1884)
6		Géza Fejérváry (1833–1914)	28 October 1884	13 March 1890	Independent	K. Tisza; SZP	9 (1884)
6		Géza Fejérváry (1833–1914)	28 October 1884	13 March 1890	Independent	K. Tisza; SZP	10 (1887)
6		Géza Fejérváry (1833–1914)	13 March 1890	19 November 1892	Independent	Szapáry; SZP	10 (1887)
6		Géza Fejérváry (1833–1914)	13 March 1890	19 November 1892	Independent	Szapáry; SZP	11 (1892)
6		Géza Fejérváry (1833–1914)	19 November 1892	15 January 1895	Independent	Wekerle I SZP	11 (1892)
6		Géza Fejérváry (1833–1914)	15 January 1895	26 February 1899	Independent	Bánffy; SZP	11 (1892)
6		Géza Fejérváry (1833–1914)	15 January 1895	26 February 1899	Independent	Bánffy; SZP	12 (1896)
6		Géza Fejérváry (1833–1914)	26 February 1899	27 June 1903	Independent	Széll; SZP	12 (1896)
6		Géza Fejérváry (1833–1914)	26 February 1899	27 June 1903	Independent	Széll; SZP	13 (1901)
7		Dezső Kolossváry (1854–1919)	27 June 1903	3 November 1903	Independent	Khuen-Héderváry I SZP	13 (1901)
8		Sándor Nyiri (1854–1911)	3 November 1903	18 June 1905	Liberal Party	I. Tisza I SZP	13 (1901)
9		Ferenc Bihar (1847–1920)	18 June 1905	6 March 1906	Independent	Fejérváry; SZP	14 (1905)
10		Béla Pap (1845–1916)	6 March 1906	8 April 1906	Independent	Fejérváry; SZP	14 (1905)
—		Sándor Wekerle (1848–1921) acting	8 April 1906	14 April 1906	National Constitution Party	Wekerle II; FÜG48–OAP–KNP–PDP	14 (1905)
11		Lajos Jekelfalussy (1848–1911)	14 April 1906	17 January 1910	National Constitution Party	Wekerle II; FÜG48–OAP–KNP–PDP	14 (1905)
11		Lajos Jekelfalussy (1848–1911)	14 April 1906	17 January 1910	National Constitution Party	Wekerle II; FÜG48–OAP–KNP–PDP	15 (1906)
12		Samu Hazai (1851–1942)	17 January 1910	22 April 1912	National Party of Work	Khuen-Héderváry II; NMP	15 (1906)
12		Samu Hazai (1851–1942)	17 January 1910	22 April 1912	National Party of Work	Khuen-Héderváry II; NMP	16 (1910)
12		Samu Hazai (1851–1942)	22 April 1912	10 June 1913	National Party of Work	Lukács; NMP	16 (1910)
12		Samu Hazai (1851–1942)	10 June 1913	19 February 1917	National Party of Work	I. Tisza II; NMP	16 (1910)
13		Sándor Szurmay (1860–1945)	19 February 1917	15 June 1917	Independent	I. Tisza II; NMP	16 (1910)
13		Sándor Szurmay (1860–1945)	15 June 1917	23 August 1917	Independent	Esterházy; NMP–FÜG48–OAP–PDP–KNP	16 (1910)
13		Sándor Szurmay (1860–1945)	23 August 1917	31 October 1918	Independent	Wekerle III; NMP–FÜG48–OAP–PDP–KNP	16 (1910)

== Ministers of War (1918–1919) ==
=== Hungarian Kingdom (1918) ===
Parties Independent

No.	Portrait	Name (Birth–Death)	Term of office		Political party	Cabinet	Assembly (Election)
1		Béla Linder (1876–1962)	31 October 1918	9 November 1918	Independent	M. Károlyi; FÜG48–K–PRP–MSZDP	MNT (—)
2		Albert Bartha (1877–1960)	9 November 1918	16 November 1918	Independent	M. Károlyi; FÜG48–K–PRP–MSZDP	MNT (—)

=== Hungarian People's Republic (1918–1919) ===
Parties FÜG48–Károlyi MSZDP Independent

No.	Portrait	Name (Birth–Death)	Term of office		Political party	Cabinet	Assembly (Election)
1		Albert Bartha (1877–1960)	16 November 1918	12 December 1918	Independent	M. Károlyi; FÜG48–K–PRP–MSZDP	MNT (—)
—		Mihály Károlyi (1875–1955) acting (de jure)	12 December 1918	29 December 1918	FÜG48–Károlyi	M. Károlyi; FÜG48–K–PRP–MSZDP	MNT (—)
—		Vilmos Böhm (1880–1949) acting (de facto)	12 December 1918	29 December 1918	MSZDP	M. Károlyi; FÜG48–K–PRP–MSZDP	MNT (—)
2		Sándor Festetics (1882–1956)	29 December 1918	19 January 1919	Independent	M. Károlyi; FÜG48–K–PRP–MSZDP	MNT (—)
3		Vilmos Böhm (1880–1949)	19 January 1919	21 March 1919	MSZDP	Berinkey; FÜG48–K–PRP–MSZDP–OKGFP	MNT (—)

== People's Commissars of War (1919) ==
=== Hungarian Soviet Republic (1919) ===
Parties MSZP/SZKMMP

No.	Portrait	Name (Birth–Death)	Term of office		Political party	Cabinet	Assembly (Election)
1		József Pogány (1886–1938)	21 March 1919	3 April 1919	MSZP	Central Executive Council; MSZP/SZKMMP	TOGY (—)
2		Béla Kun (1886–1939) serving with Vilmos Böhm, Rezső Fiedler, József Haubrich and Béla Szántó	3 April 1919	24 June 1919	MSZP/SZKMMP	Central Executive Council; MSZP/SZKMMP	TOGY (—)
2		Vilmos Böhm (1880–1949) serving with Béla Kun, Rezső Fiedler, József Haubrich and Béla Szántó	3 April 1919	24 June 1919	MSZP/SZKMMP	Central Executive Council; MSZP/SZKMMP	TOGY (—)
2		Rezső Fiedler (1884–1939) serving with Béla Kun, Vilmos Böhm, József Haubrich and Béla Szántó	3 April 1919	24 June 1919	MSZP/SZKMMP	Central Executive Council; MSZP/SZKMMP	TOGY (—)
2		József Haubrich (1883–1939) serving with Béla Kun, Vilmos Böhm, Rezső Fiedler and Béla Szántó	3 April 1919	24 June 1919	MSZP/SZKMMP	Central Executive Council; MSZP/SZKMMP	TOGY (—)
2		Béla Szántó (1881–1951) serving with Béla Kun, Vilmos Böhm, Rezső Fiedler and József Haubrich until 24 June 1919	3 April 1919	24 June 1919	MSZP/SZKMMP	Central Executive Council; MSZP/SZKMMP	TOGY (—)
3		Béla Szántó (1881–1951) serving with Béla Kun, Vilmos Böhm, Rezső Fiedler and József Haubrich until 24 June 1919	24 June 1919	1 August 1919	SZKMMP	Central Executive Council; MSZP/SZKMMP	TOGY (—)

==== Counter-revolutionary governments (1919) ====
Parties Independent

No.	Portrait	Name (Birth–Death)	Term of office		Political party	Cabinet	Assembly (Election)
—		Zoltán Szabó (1858–1934)	5 May 1919	31 May 1919	Independent	Arad	—
—		Miklós Horthy (1868–1957)	31 May 1919	6 June 1919	Independent	Szeged I	—
—		Miklós Horthy (1868–1957)	6 June 1919	12 July 1919	Independent	Szeged II	—
—		Sándor Belitska (1872–1939)	12 July 1919	12 August 1919	Independent	Szeged III	—

== Ministers of War (1919–1920) ==
=== Hungarian People's Republic (1919) ===
Parties MSZDP

No.	Portrait	Name (Birth–Death)	Term of office		Political party	Cabinet	Assembly (Election)
1		József Haubrich (1883–1939)	1 August 1919	6 August 1919 (deposed)	MSZDP	Peidl; MSZDP	—

=== Hungarian Republic (1919–1920) ===
Parties KNEP Independent

No.	Portrait	Name (Birth–Death)	Term of office		Political party	Cabinet	Assembly (Election)
1		Ferenc Schnetzer (1867–1944)	15 August 1919	24 November 1919	Independent	Friedrich; KNP/KNEP–OKGFP	—
2		István Friedrich (1883–1951)	24 November 1919	29 February 1920	KNEP	Huszár; KNEP–OKGFP–MSZDP–NDPP	—

== Ministers of Defence (1920–present) ==
=== Hungarian Kingdom (1920–1946) ===
Parties KNEP EP–NEP–MÉP Independent

No.	Portrait	Name (Birth–Death)	Term of office		Political party	Cabinet	Assembly (Election)
1		István Friedrich (1883–1951)	29 February 1920	15 March 1920	KNEP	Huszár; KNEP–OKGFP–MSZDP–NDPP	—
2		Károly Soós (1869–1953)	15 March 1920	19 July 1920	Independent	Simonyi-Semadam; KNEP–OKGFP	17 (1920)
2		István Sréter (1867–1942)	19 July 1920	16 December 1920	Independent	Teleki I KNEP–OKGFP	17 (1920)
3		Sándor Belitska (1872–1939)	16 December 1920	14 April 1921	Independent	Teleki I KNEP–OKGFP	17 (1920)
3		Sándor Belitska (1872–1939)	14 April 1921	28 June 1923	Independent	Bethlen (KNEP–OKGFP)→EP	17 (1920)
3		Sándor Belitska (1872–1939)	14 April 1921	28 June 1923	Independent	Bethlen (KNEP–OKGFP)→EP	18 (1922)
4		Károly Csáky (1873–1945)	28 June 1923	10 October 1929	Independent	Bethlen (KNEP–OKGFP)→EP	18 (1922)
4		Károly Csáky (1873–1945)	28 June 1923	10 October 1929	Independent	Bethlen (KNEP–OKGFP)→EP	19 (1926)
5		Gyula Gömbös (1886–1936)	10 November 1929	24 August 1931	EP	Bethlen (KNEP–OKGFP)→EP	19 (1926)
5		Gyula Gömbös (1886–1936)	10 November 1929	24 August 1931	EP	Bethlen (KNEP–OKGFP)→EP	20 (1931)
5		Gyula Gömbös (1886–1936)	24 August 1931	1 October 1932	EP	G. Károlyi; EP–KGSZP	20 (1931)
5		Gyula Gömbös (1886–1936)	1 October 1932	2 September 1936	NEP	Gömbös; NEP	20 (1931)
5		Gyula Gömbös (1886–1936)	1 October 1932	2 September 1936	NEP	Gömbös; NEP	21 (1935)
—		Miklós Kozma (1884–1941) acting for Gyula Gömbös	14 May 1936	7 August 1936	NEP	Gömbös; NEP	21 (1935)
6		József Somkuthy (1883–1961)	2 September 1936	6 October 1936	NEP	Gömbös; NEP	21 (1935)
7		Vilmos Rőder (1881–1969)	12 October 1936	14 May 1938	NEP	Darányi; NEP	21 (1935)
8		Jenő Rátz (1882–1949)	14 May 1938	15 November 1938	NEP	Imrédy; NEP	21 (1935)
9		Károly Bartha (1884–1964)	15 November 1938	16 February 1939	Independent	Imrédy; NEP	21 (1935)
9		Károly Bartha (1884–1964)	16 February 1939	3 April 1941	Independent	Teleki II; MÉP	21 (1935)
9		Károly Bartha (1884–1964)	16 February 1939	3 April 1941	Independent	Teleki II; MÉP	22 (1939)
9		Károly Bartha (1884–1964)	3 April 1941	9 March 1942	Independent	Bárdossy; MÉP	22 (1939)
9		Károly Bartha (1884–1964)	9 March 1942	24 September 1942	Independent	Kállay; MÉP	22 (1939)
10		Vilmos Nagy (1884–1976)	24 September 1942	12 June 1943	Independent	Kállay; MÉP	22 (1939)
11		Lajos Csatay (1886–1944)	12 June 1943	22 March 1944 (deposed)	Independent	Kállay; MÉP	22 (1939)
11		Lajos Csatay (1886–1944)	22 March 1944	29 August 1944	Independent	Sztójay; MÉP–MMP	22 (1939)
11		Lajos Csatay (1886–1944)	29 August 1944	16 October 1944 (deposed)	Independent	Lakatos; MÉP	22 (1939)

==== Government of National Unity (1944–1945) ====
Parties Independent

No.	Portrait	Name (Birth–Death)	Term of office		Political party	Cabinet	Assembly (Election)
1		Károly Beregfy (1888–1946)	16 October 1944	28 March 1945	Independent	Szálasi; NYKP–MMP	—

==== Soviet-backed provisional governments (1944–1946) ====
Parties Independent

No.	Portrait	Name (Birth–Death)	Term of office		Political party	Cabinet	Assembly (Election)
1		János Vörös (1891–1968)	22 December 1944	15 November 1945	Independent	Provisional National Government; FKGP–MKP–MSZDP–NPP–PDP	INGY (1944)
2		Jenő Tombor (1880–1946)	15 November 1945	1 February 1946	Independent	Tildy; FKGP–MKP–MSZDP–NPP	23 (1945)

=== Hungarian Republic (1946–1949) ===
Parties FKGP NPP MKP-MDP

No.	Portrait	Name (Birth–Death)	Term of office		Political party	Cabinet	Assembly (Election)
1		Jenő Tombor (1880–1946)	1 February 1946	4 February 1946	Independent	Tildy; FKGP–MKP–MSZDP–NPP	23 (1945)
1		Jenő Tombor (1880–1946)	4 February 1946	25 July 1946 (died in office)	Independent	F. Nagy; FKGP–MKP–MSZDP–NPP	23 (1945)
—		Ferenc Nagy (1903–1979) acting	9 August 1946	21 August 1946	FKGP	F. Nagy; FKGP–MKP–MSZDP–NPP	23 (1945)
2		Albert Bartha (1877–1960)	21 August 1946	14 March 1947	Independent	F. Nagy; FKGP–MKP–MSZDP–NPP	23 (1945)
—		Lajos Dinnyés (1901–1961) acting	14 March 1947	31 May 1947	FKGP	F. Nagy; FKGP–MKP–MSZDP–NPP	23 (1945)
—		Lajos Dinnyés (1901–1961) acting	31 May 1947	24 September 1947	FKGP	Dinnyés; MKP–FKGP–MSZDP–NPP	23 (1945)
—		Lajos Dinnyés (1901–1961) acting	31 May 1947	24 September 1947	FKGP	Dinnyés; MKP–FKGP–MSZDP–NPP	24 (1947)
3		Péter Veres (1897–1970)	24 September 1947	9 September 1948	NPP	Dinnyés; MKP–FKGP–MSZDP–NPP	24 (1947)
4		Mihály Farkas (1904–1965)	9 September 1948	10 December 1948	MDP	Dinnyés; MDP–FKGP–NPP	24 (1947)
4		Mihály Farkas (1904–1965)	10 December 1948	20 August 1949	MDP	Dobi; MDP–FKGP–NPP	24 (1947)
4		Mihály Farkas (1904–1965)	10 December 1948	20 August 1949	MDP	Dobi; MDP–FKGP–NPP	25 (1949)

=== Hungarian People's Republic (1949–1989) ===
Parties MDP-MSZMP MSZP

No.	Portrait	Name (Birth–Death)	Term of office		Political party	Cabinet	Assembly (Election)
1		Mihály Farkas (1904–1965)	20 August 1949	14 August 1952	MDP	Dobi; MDP	25 (1949)
1		Mihály Farkas (1904–1965)	14 August 1952	4 July 1953	MDP	Rákosi; MDP	25 (1949)
2		István Bata (1910–1982)	4 July 1953	18 April 1955	MDP	I. Nagy I MDP	26 (1953)
2		István Bata (1910–1982)	18 April 1955	24 October 1956	MDP	Hegedüs; MDP	26 (1953)
2		István Bata (1910–1982)	24 October 1956	26 October 1956	MDP	I. Nagy II; MDP→MSZMP–FKGP	26 (1953)
3		Károly Janza (1914–2001)	26 October 1956	3 November 1956	MDP→MSZMP	I. Nagy II; MDP→MSZMP–FKGP	26 (1953)
4		Pál Maléter (1917–1958)	3 November 1956	4 November 1956	MSZMP	I. Nagy III; MSZMP–FKGP–MSZDP–PP	26 (1953)
5		Ferenc Münnich (1886–1966)	12 November 1956	1 March 1957	MSZMP	Kádár I MSZMP	26 (1953)
6		Géza Révész (1902–1977)	1 March 1957	28 January 1958	MSZMP	Kádár I MSZMP	26 (1953)
6		Géza Révész (1902–1977)	28 January 1958	17 May 1960	MSZMP	Münnich; MSZMP	26 (1953)
6		Géza Révész (1902–1977)	28 January 1958	17 May 1960	MSZMP	Münnich; MSZMP	27 (1958)
7		Lajos Czinege (1924–1998)	17 May 1960	13 September 1961	MSZMP	Münnich; MSZMP	27 (1958)
7		Lajos Czinege (1924–1998)	13 September 1961	30 June 1965	MSZMP	Kádár II; MSZMP	27 (1958)
7		Lajos Czinege (1924–1998)	13 September 1961	30 June 1965	MSZMP	Kádár II; MSZMP	28 (1963)
7		Lajos Czinege (1924–1998)	30 June 1965	14 April 1967	MSZMP	Kállai; MSZMP	28 (1963)
7		Lajos Czinege (1924–1998)	14 April 1967	15 May 1975	MSZMP	Fock; MSZMP	29 (1967)
7		Lajos Czinege (1924–1998)	14 April 1967	15 May 1975	MSZMP	Fock; MSZMP	30 (1971)
7		Lajos Czinege (1924–1998)	15 May 1975	6 December 1984	MSZMP	Lázár; MSZMP	30 (1971)
7		Lajos Czinege (1924–1998)	15 May 1975	6 December 1984	MSZMP	Lázár; MSZMP	31 (1975)
7		Lajos Czinege (1924–1998)	15 May 1975	6 December 1984	MSZMP	Lázár; MSZMP	32 (1980)
8		István Oláh (1926–1985)	6 December 1984	15 December 1985 (died in office)	MSZMP	Lázár; MSZMP	32 (1980)
8		István Oláh (1926–1985)	6 December 1984	15 December 1985 (died in office)	MSZMP	Lázár; MSZMP	33 (1985)
9		Ferenc Kárpáti (1926–2013)	30 December 1985	25 June 1987	MSZMP	Lázár; MSZMP	33 (1985)
9		Ferenc Kárpáti (1926–2013)	25 June 1987	24 November 1988	MSZMP	Grósz; MSZMP	33 (1985)
9		Ferenc Kárpáti (1926–2013)	24 November 1988	7 October 1989	MSZMP	Németh (MSZMP)→MSZP	33 (1985)
(9)		Ferenc Kárpáti (1926–2013)	7 October 1989	23 October 1989	Independent	Németh (MSZMP)→MSZP	33 (1985)

=== Hungarian Republic / Hungary (1989–present) ===
Parties MSZP Fidesz MDF KDNP FKGP TISZA Independent

No.	Portrait	Name (Birth–Death)	Term of office		Political party	Cabinet	Assembly (Election)
—		Ferenc Kárpáti (1926–2013) provisional	23 October 1989	23 May 1990	Independent	Németh; MSZP	—
1		Lajos Für (1930–2013)	23 May 1990	21 December 1993	MDF	Antall; MDF–FKGP–KDNP	34 (1990)
1		Lajos Für (1930–2013)	21 December 1993	15 July 1994	MDF	Boross; MDF–EKGP–KDNP	34 (1990)
2		György Keleti (1946–2020)	15 July 1994	8 July 1998	MSZP	Horn; MSZP–SZDSZ	35 (1994)
3		János Szabó (born 1941)	8 July 1998	27 May 2002	FKGP	Orbán I Fidesz–FKGP–MDF	36 (1998)
4		Ferenc Juhász (born 1960)	27 May 2002	29 September 2004	MSZP	Medgyessy; MSZP–SZDSZ	37 (2002)
4		Ferenc Juhász (born 1960)	29 September 2004	9 June 2006	MSZP	Gyurcsány I MSZP–SZDSZ	37 (2002)
5		Imre Szekeres (born 1950)	9 June 2006	14 April 2009	MSZP	Gyurcsány II; MSZP–SZDSZ	38 (2006)
5		Imre Szekeres (born 1950)	14 April 2009	29 May 2010	MSZP	Bajnai; MSZP	38 (2006)
6		Csaba Hende (born 1960)	29 May 2010	6 June 2014	Fidesz	Orbán II; Fidesz–KDNP	39 (2010)
6		Csaba Hende (born 1960)	6 June 2014	9 September 2015	Fidesz	Orbán III; Fidesz–KDNP	40 (2014)
7		István Simicskó (born 1961)	10 September 2015	18 May 2018	KDNP	Orbán III; Fidesz–KDNP	40 (2014)
8		Tibor Benkő (born 1955)	18 May 2018	24 May 2022	Independent	Orbán IV; Fidesz–KDNP	41 (2018)
9		Kristóf Szalay-Bobrovniczky (born 1970)	24 May 2022	12 May 2026	Independent	Orbán V Fidesz–KDNP	42 (2022)
10		Romulusz Ruszin-Szendi (born 1973)	12 May 2026	Incumbent	TISZA	Magyar; TISZA	43 (2026)

== See also ==
- List of heads of state of Hungary
- List of prime ministers of Hungary
- Politics of Hungary

Cabinet ministers

- Minister of Agriculture (Hungary)
- Minister of Civilian Intelligence Services (Hungary)
- Minister of Croatian Affairs of Hungary
- Minister of Education (Hungary)
- Minister of Finance (Hungary)
- Minister of Foreign Affairs (Hungary)
- Minister of the Interior (Hungary)
- Minister of Justice (Hungary)
- Minister of Public Works and Transport (Hungary)
