= Soviet reaction to the Polish crisis of 1980–1981 =

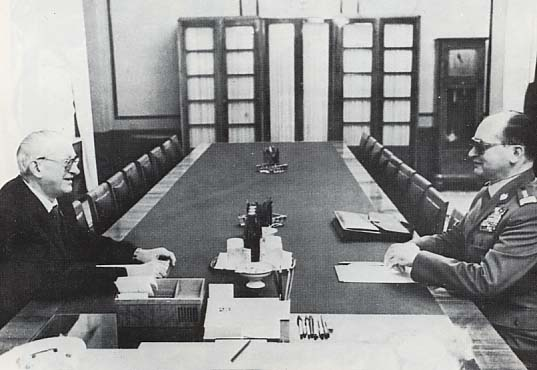
Andropov and Jaruzelski, 1982

The Polish crisis of 1980–1981, associated with the emergence of the Solidarity mass movement in the Polish People's Republic, challenged the rule of the Polish United Workers' Party and Poland's alignment with the Soviet Union. For the first time, however, the Kremlin abstained from military intervention, unlike on previous occasions such as the Prague Spring of 1968 and the Hungarian Revolution of 1956, and thus left the Polish leadership under General Wojciech Jaruzelski to impose martial law to deal with the opposition on its own.

== Initial reaction ==
Eastern Bloc

Contrary to the interpretations of US intelligence, no preparations were underway for even minimal Soviet intervention at the time martial law was imposed, according to declassified Soviet archives. On 25 August 1980, a special commission was created in Moscow to formulate policy in response to developments in Poland. It was headed by senior Communist Party ideologist Mikhail Suslov, and included KGB chairman Yuri Andropov, foreign minister Andrei Gromyko, and defense minister Dmitriy Ustinov. They were reluctant to intervene in Poland, recalling the 1970 Polish protests, and dealing already with problems in the ongoing Soviet–Afghan War. The situation in Poland in December 1980 had parallels with the situation in Afghanistan before the Soviet Union eventually decided to intervene there exactly a year earlier, which led to consequences and a dip in the Soviets' relations with the United States.

The East German and Czechoslovak leaders, Erich Honecker and Gustáv Husák, however, were eager to suppress Solidarity, along the lines of previous crackdowns. The aging Soviet leader Leonid Brezhnev agreed with Honecker and Husák, leaning towards intervention. A planned joint Soviet, East German, and Czechoslovak attack, under the pretext of a Warsaw Pact military exercise called 'Soyuz-80,' was planned for December.

Deeply concerned Polish United Workers' Party (PUWP) leaders, who had initially been lenient, slowly began to consider suppression of the popular movement on their own. On 22 October, Polish defense minister Jaruzelski started planning for martial law.

United States intelligence, by this time, had an accurate idea of the Warsaw Pact's plans. National Security Adviser Zbigniew Brzezinski persuaded President Jimmy Carter to disclose the Warsaw Pact military build-up publicly and to warn the Soviet Union of its consequences.

On 5 December, at the insistence of Honecker, the Warsaw Pact countries held a summit in Moscow. The Polish leader, first secretary of the PUWP Stanisław Kania, promised to do his best to uproot the opposition by domestic means. Brezhnev did not insist on armed intervention, Kania having managed to persuade him that foreign intervention would lead to a national uprising. Intervention was postponed, to give Polish leaders a chance to deal with the situation on their own.

== Final decision ==
However, the Kremlin was discontented with how leniently this suppression proceeded, and on 18 October 1981, it forced the Polish United Workers' Party to replace Kania with Jaruzelski. The latter promised to impose martial law but demanded backing his action by a promise of Warsaw Pact military intervention if he failed to control the situation. On 29 October, Jaruzelski's demands were discussed at a session of the Soviet Politburo, where Andropov confirmed the consensus that no Soviet troops would be sent to Poland.

At the 14th annual meeting of the Committee of Ministers of Defense of the Warsaw Pact, which took place in Moscow on 1–4 December, Jaruzelski's deputy Florian Siwicki on behalf of the former proposed to issue a bluffing strong statement pledging support of the Warsaw Pact armed forces to the Polish authorities in order to give a "cold shower for the counterrevolution" and to deny western claims that Jaruzelski didn't have backing of his allies. The Soviet, East German, Czechoslovak and Bulgarian ministers, Dmitriy Ustinov, Heinz Hoffmann, Martin Dzúr and Dobri Dzhurov, supported the proposal. However, it failed to pass because Romanian minister Constantin Olteanu, who was not aware that the plans for invasion had already been discarded and took the threat for real, vetoed the draft after consultations with Nicolae Ceauşescu, and his Hungarian counterpart Lajos Czinege was not ready to agree unless everyone else did.

At the Politburo meeting of 10 December 1981, the Soviet leadership was outraged to learn that Jaruzelski was still making his crackdown on Solidarity conditional on a promise of a Soviet military intervention if anything went wrong. The Politburo firmly and unanimously rejected the demand for military backing. Andropov, one of the most influential figures in the Politburo, who would become the Soviet leader in less than a year, wary of the threat of Western political and economic sanctions, made it clear to his fellow Politburo members that he was ready to reconcile himself to the possible loss of the Soviet control over Poland to Solidarity, however unpleasant it might be, if the Soviet communications with East Germany via Poland continued uninterrupted:

We can't risk such a step. We do not intend to introduce troops into Poland. That is the proper position, and we must adhere to it until the end. I don't know how things will turn out in Poland, but even if Poland falls under the control of Solidarity, that's the way it will be. And if the capitalist countries pounce on the Soviet Union, and you know they have already reached agreement on a variety of economic and political sanctions, that will be very burdensome for us. We must be concerned above all with our own country and about the strengthening of the Soviet Union. That is our main line.... As concerns the lines of communication between the Soviet Union and the GDR that run through Poland, we of course must do something to ensure that they are safeguarded.

Chief ideologist Suslov supported him, considering the possibility of invasion after the Soviet support of détente in the 1970s as a severe blow to the Soviet international standing. The Brezhnev Doctrine was effectively dead.

== Martial law ==
After unsuccessfully begging Warsaw Pact commander-in-chief Viktor Kulikov and Soviet ambassador Boris Aristov for military assistance once again, on 13 December 1981, Jaruzelski finally proclaimed martial law. To justify the emergency measures, Jaruzelski was still playing on the public fear of Soviet invasion. However, there was no significant resistance to the martial law and any foreign military backing proved unnecessary. Ever since, Jaruzelski himself has denied that he invited Soviet troops, insisting that, on the contrary, the martial law was aimed at prevention of a Soviet military intervention.

== 1997 Jachranka conference ==
In November 1997, a conference was held in Jachranka on the Soviet role in the Polish crisis of 1980–1981, where Solidarity, Polish communist, Soviet and American participants of the events, including Jaruzelski, Kania, Siwicki, Kulikov and Brzezinski, took part. Jaruzelski and Siwicki maintained that the Soviets had been preparing for invasion all the time, Kania and Brzezinski opined that the plans for invasion had been discarded by the second half of 1981 and Kulikov denied the existence of any plans to intervene even in 1980.
