= Béla Pap =

Hungarian military officer and politician

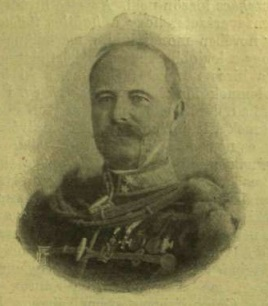
- Béla Pap, depicted in Vasárnapi Újság Vol. 53. No. 11. (March 1906)
- Born: 26 March 1845; Marcali, Kingdom of Hungary, Austrian Empire
- Died: 1 October 1916 (aged 71); Waidhofen an der Ybbs, Austria-Hungary
- Military career
- Allegiance: Austrian Empire; Austria-Hungary
- Service years: 1866–1907
- Rank: Lieutenant General

Béla Pap de Szill (26 March 1845 – 1 October 1916) was a Hungarian military officer and politician, who served as Minister of Defence from March to April 1906, during the Hungarian Constitutional Crisis of 1905.

== Biography ==
After finishing Theresian Military Academy, Pap involved in the Austrian Imperial Army since 1866, when he became sapper lieutenant of the 2nd Technical Regiment, which participated in the Third Italian War of Independence. In 1899, he was promoted to major general. From 1901 to 1904 he served as Chief of the 3rd Group of the Ministry of Defence. After that he was promoted to lieutenant general and appointed Department Head of the Joint Ministry of Defence of the Austro-Hungarian Empire, holding this office between 1904 and 1905. In March 1906, he was made Minister of Defence in the non-partisan Hungarian cabinet of Géza Fejérváry for a period of one month. He was again Department Head of the Joint Ministry of Defence following that, between 1906 and 1907. He retired in 1907.

In June 1904, Pap and his descendants were granted nobility and permission for the right to use prefix "de Szill" by Emperor-King Francis Joseph I.

== Works ==
- Pap, Béla: Die anwendung der optischen Telegraphie im Felde, Vienna, 1871.

== Sources ==
- Magyar Életrajzi Lexikon

Political offices
Preceded by Ferenc Bihar	Minister of Defence; 1906	Succeeded by Sándor Wekerle
