= István Sréter =

Hungarian military officer and politician (1867–1942)

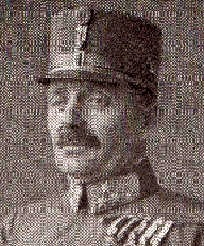
- Born: 10 November 1867; Cserhátsurány, Kingdom of Hungary, Austria-Hungary
- Died: 2 September 1942 (aged 74); Budapest, Kingdom of Hungary
- Military career
- Allegiance: Austria-Hungary; Kingdom of Hungary
- Service years: 1898–1928
- Rank: Lieutenant General
- Units: Sixth Infantry Regiment, Seventeenth Infantry Regiment, Nineteenth Infantry Regiment, Fortieth Infantry Regiment
- Conflicts: World War I
- Awards: Order of Leopold, Order of the Iron Crown, Military Merit Medal, Iron Cross

István Sréter de Szanda (10 November 1867 – 2 September 1942) was a Hungarian military officer and politician, who served as Minister of Defence in second half of 1920.

Political offices
Preceded by Károly Soós	Minister of Defence; 1920	Succeeded by Sándor Belitska
