= Lajos Czinege =

Hungarian military officer and politician

Deputy Chairman of the Council of Ministers of the People's Republic of Hungary
- In office December 6, 1984 – June 25, 1987
- Prime Minister: György Lázár
- Succeeded by: István Horváth

Minister of Defence of Hungary
- In office May 17, 1960 – December 6, 1984
- Leader: János Kádár
- Preceded by: Géza Révész
- Succeeded by: István Oláh

Personal details
- Born: 24 March 1924 Karcag, Hungary
- Died: 10 May 1998 (aged 74) Leányfalu, Hungary
- Resting place: Farkasréti Cemetery
- Party: Hungarian Socialist Workers' Party

Military service
- Allegiance: Hungarian People's Republic
- Branch/service: Hungarian People's Army
- Years of service: 1944-1989
- Rank: General of the Army
- Battles/wars: World War II; Warsaw Pact invasion of Czechoslovakia

Lajos Czinege (24 March 1924 – 10 May 1998) was a Hungarian military officer and politician, who served as Minister of Defence from 1960 to 1984 and Deputy Chairman of the Council of Ministers of the People's Republic of Hungary from 1984 to 1987.

== His youth ==
Born in Karcag, his father was an agricultural worker and he began working as a peasant from childhood, then after graduating from elementary school he studied to be a blacksmith. In the autumn of 1944 he became a member of the 25th Waffen Grenadier Division of the SS Hunyadi (1st Hungarian). In 1945 he joined the Hungarian Communist Party and participated in the formation of the Karcag group of the Hungarian Democratic Youth Association, the party's youth organization. In 1946 he served as a volunteer technical soldier, and this is where his soaring political and military career began.

== Political and military career ==
In 1947 he was appointed secretary of the MKP in Karcag. After completing the two-month "quick-start" party school, from 1948 he worked in the Szolnok county organs of the Hungarian Workers' Party. He was the city secretary of the MKP in Karcag, the agitation-propaganda and then organizational secretary of the county party committee. In 1950–51 he was the foreman and then deputy director of the Agricultural Machinery Repair Company. In his highest position he was the department head of the Szolnok County Executive Committee of the MDP. In 1952 he was assigned to Budapest, to the Ministry of Defense, where he became the head of the political department of the artillery units with the rank of lieutenant colonel. He graduated from the three-year Stalin Political Academy.

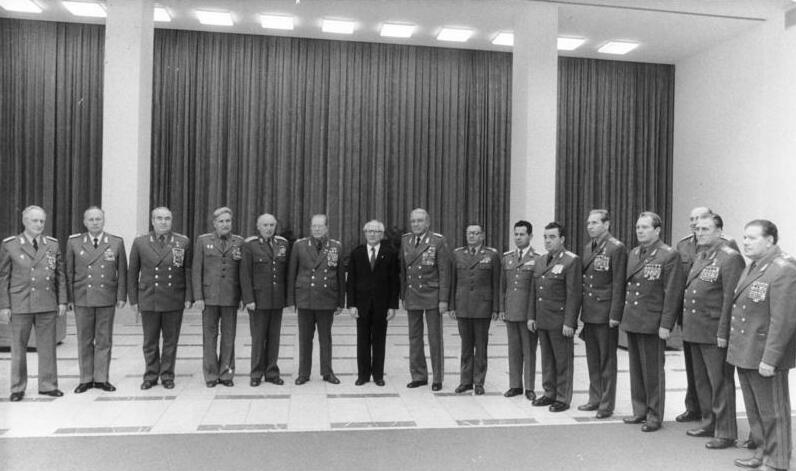
Lajos Czinege is in the fourth from right of Erich Honecker (in suit).

He actively participated in the suppression of the 1956 revolution. From October 26, 1956, he was a member of the Military Committee of the MDP, which was established to lead the attempts to suppress the armed uprising. He actively participated in the formation of the Workers' Guard.

== Post-Hungarian Revolution and Minister of Defence ==
After 1956, he became a defining political leader of the Kádár era. Between 1957 and 1960, he was the first secretary of the party in Szolnok County. Between 16 November 1958 and 28 January 1967, he was a member of parliament, entering the legislature from the Szolnok County list of the Patriotic People's Front. The Presidential Council appointed him Minister of Defense with effect from 17 May 1960, and at the same time – not unique at that time – he was immediately promoted from reserve lieutenant colonel to lieutenant general. He served in this position until 1984.

In August 1968, the invasion of Czechoslovakia took place during his term in office. He played a decisive role in various Warsaw Pact forums and opposed the planned Soviet reaction to the Polish crisis of 1980–1981. He also played a prominent role in the political leadership as a member of the Central Committee (1959–88) and a substitute member of the Politburo (1961–70). He was the only Warsaw Pact defense minister who did not become a full member of the Politburo.

The Hungarian People's Army reached its highest level of development under his leadership. He was also responsible for several privileges granted to soldiers, but scandals are also associated with his name. The book titled Little Kings in Uniform by Prof. Dr. Engineer Colonel Imre Bokor was written about the period of Czinege's office and the irregularities of the military leadership at that time. The interesting thing about the book is that a separate OGY resolution was issued to investigate its contents.

== Later years ==
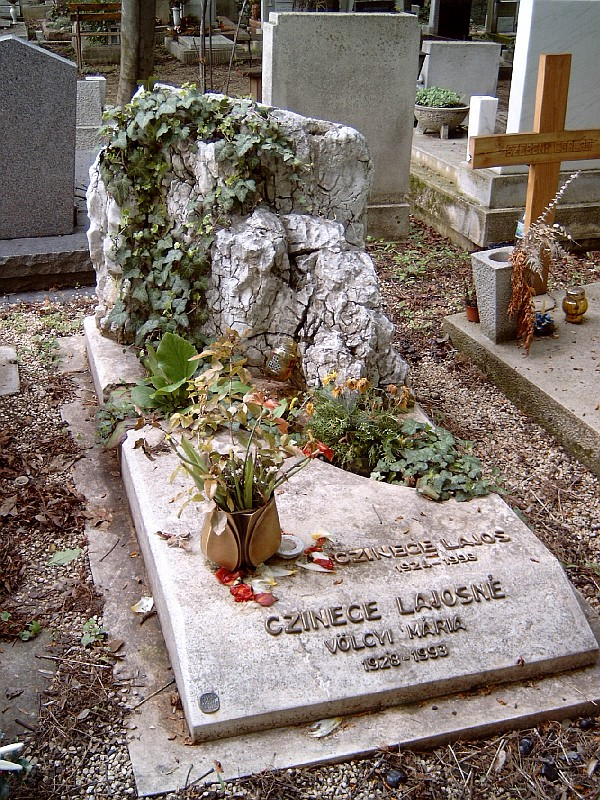
The grave of General Lajos Czinege in Budapest.

After leaving the Ministry of Defense, he served as Deputy Chairman of the Council of Ministers from 1984 to 1987. After the change of regime, he did not engage in politics, and in 1989 Miklós Németh also announced that he had resigned from his rank of army general. After his retirement, his name was mentioned in the press again in connection with his son, entrepreneur József Czinege (Dodi), when it was revealed in 1993 that Prime Minister Péter Boross and his son Gábor had founded Boross Holding Limited Liability Company. The company received special attention from the press due to its participation in the arms trade during the Yugoslav War. During his retirement years, Czinege lived in his house in Leányfalu until his death in 1998.

== Awards ==
- Order of Lenin
- Order of Merit of the October Revolution
- Commemorative Medal for the Capture of Budapest
- Order of the Flag of the Hungarian People's Republic
- Jubilee Medal "In Commemoration of the 100th Anniversary of the Birth of Vladimir Ilyich Lenin"

Political offices
Preceded by Géza Révész	Minister of Defence; 1960–1984	Succeeded by István Oláh
