= Pál Maléter =

20th-century Hungarian military officer and leader of the 1956 revolution

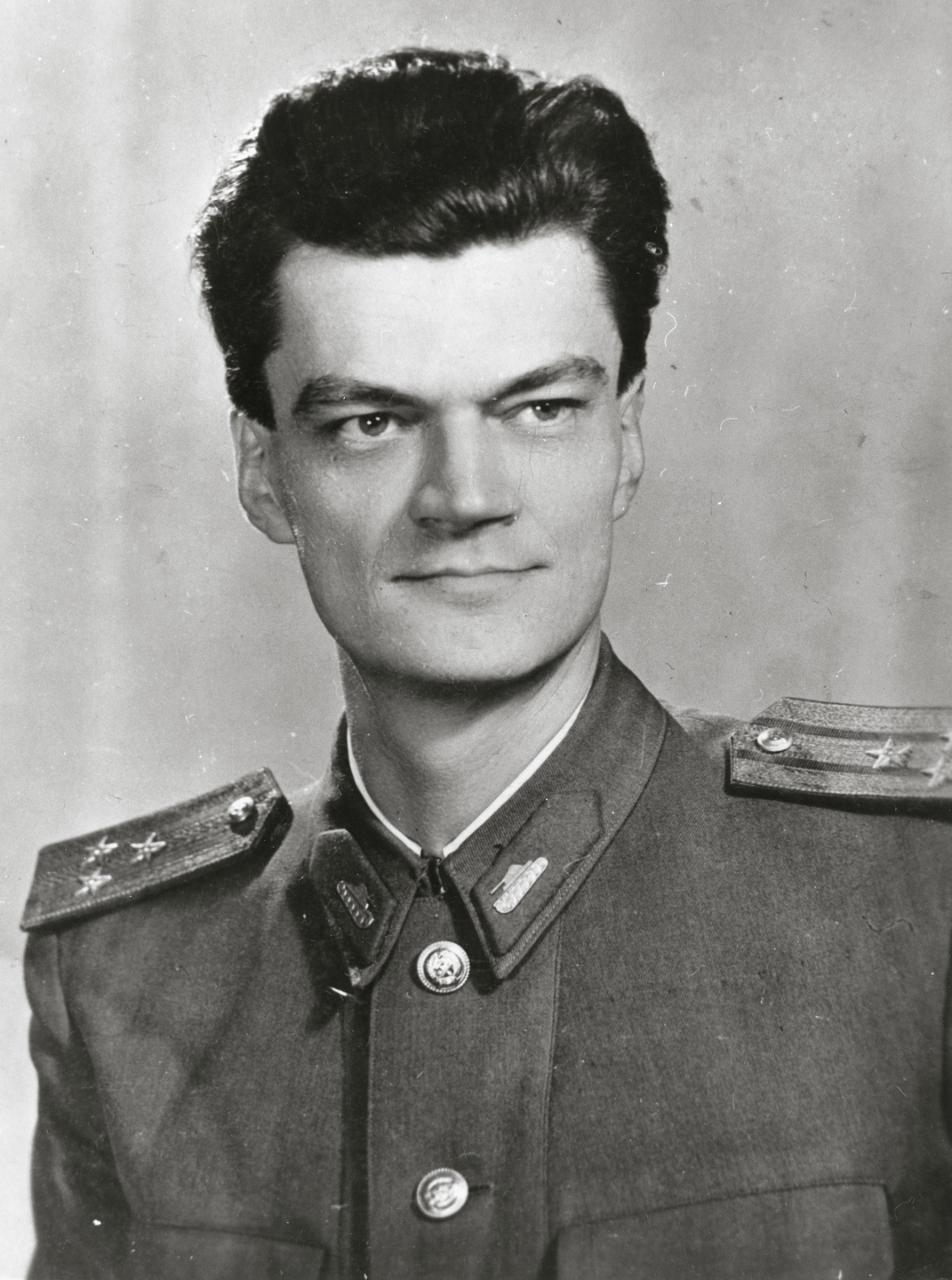
- Maléter in 1956

Minister of Defence of the Hungarian People's Republic
- In office 3 November 1956 – 12 November 1956 (Note: de facto 4 November)
- Prime Minister: Imre Nagy
- Preceded by: Károly Janza
- Succeeded by: Ferenc Münnich

Personal details
- Born: Pál Maléter; 4 September 1917 Eperjes, Sáros County, Kingdom of Hungary, Austria-Hungary
- Died: 16 June 1958 (aged 40) Budapest, Hungarian People's Republic
- Cause of death: Execution by hanging
- Resting place: New Public Cemetery, Budapest
- Party: MKP; MSZMP
- Spouse: Mária Pausz
- Children: 3
- Parents: István Maléter (father); Margit Lakner (mother)
- Education: Charles University (BS); Eötvös Loránd University; Ludovica Academy
- Occupation: chemist; military officer

Military service
- Allegiance: Kingdom of Hungary; Soviet Union; Hungarian People's Republic; Hungarian revolutionaries
- Years of service: 1942–1956
- Rank: Colonel General
- Battles/wars: World War II; Eastern Front; Hungarian Revolution of 1956 (executed)

Pál Maléter (Hungarian pronunciation: [ˈpaːl ˈmɒleːtɛr]; 4 September 1917 – 16 June 1958) was a Hungarian military officer and notable figure in the 1956 Hungarian Revolution who served as minister of defence in the third government of Imre Nagy.

Maléter was born to Hungarian parents in Eperjes, a city in Sáros County, in the northern part of Kingdom of Hungary, today Prešov, Slovakia. He studied medicine at the Charles University, Prague, before moving to Budapest in 1938, going to the military academy there. He fought on the Eastern Front of World War II for the Axis, until captured by the Red Army. He became a communist, trained in sabotage, fought against the Germans in Transylvania and was sent back to Hungary, where he was noted for his courage and daring. In 1945 he joined the Hungarian Communist Party.

In 1956 he was a Colonel and served with the General Staff in Budapest when during the Hungarian Uprising he was sent to relieve a unit at the Kilian barracks with some tanks and a company of officer cadets. However, only Maléter's tank arrived at the barracks, and with the permission of his superiors, he agreed to a cease-fire with the insurgent groups in the area. Later (the exact time of this is disputed) he switched to the insurgents' side, helping them to defend the Kilian Barracks against Soviet troops. He was the most prominent member of the Hungarian military to change sides, allying himself with the insurgents, rather than with Ernő Gerő's communist government.

As the chief military presence on the insurgents' side, he came into contact with the new government and on 29 October, he was appointed Minister of Defense, and was promoted to Major General on 2 November. On 3 November, he went to Tököl, located near Budapest, to negotiate with the Soviet military forces based there. During discussions on the following day, and against international law, Soviet officers arrested Maléter at the conference and imprisoned him.

He was executed, along with Imre Nagy and others, in a Budapest prison on 16 June 1958 on charges of attempting to overthrow the Hungarian People's Republic. His first wife and three children went to the U.S. in the wake of the uprising, and his second wife remained in Hungary. Both wives subsequently remarried. His only son, Pál Maléter II (1946 – January 4, 2017), was trained at the Hotchkiss School and Columbia University before becoming an architect in the United States Department of Veterans Affairs.

In June 1989, on the anniversary of their deaths, Imre Nagy, Pál Maléter, three others who had died in prison and a sixth empty coffin, symbolising all those who had died, were formally reburied in Budapest with full honours. He was also promoted to Colonel General posthumously.

A pine cultivar has been named after him, a dwarf variety. Maléter was known for his great height; according to historian Victor Sebestyen, Maléter was "more than two meters tall", or at least six feet eight inches (203 cm).

== Notes ==
Political offices
Preceded by Károly Janza	Minister of Defence; 1956	Succeeded by Ferenc Münnich
