= Károly Soós (Minister of Defence) =

Hungarian military officer and politician

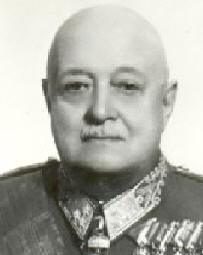
- Born: 28 July 1869; Nagyszeben, Kingdom of Hungary, Austria-Hungary
- Died: 24 June 1953 (aged 83); Steinfort, Luxembourg
- Military career
- Allegiance: Austria-Hungary; Kingdom of Hungary
- Service years: 1890–1922
- Rank: General
- Units: Fourth Austro-Hungarian Army, Thirty-third Pawn Brigade, Eleventh Austro-Hungarian Army
- Conflicts: World War I
- Awards: Order of Leopold, Order of the Iron Crown, Military Merit Medal

Vitéz Károly Soós de Bádok (28 July 1869 – 24 June 1953) was a Hungarian military officer and politician, who served as Minister of Defence in 1920. He participated in the working of revolutionary counter-government organizations on Szeged against the Hungarian Soviet Republic. Soós became the first Chief of Army Staff of the National Army.

Political offices
Preceded by István Friedrich	Minister of Defence; 1920	Succeeded by István Sréter
