= Egyházasrádóc =

- Village
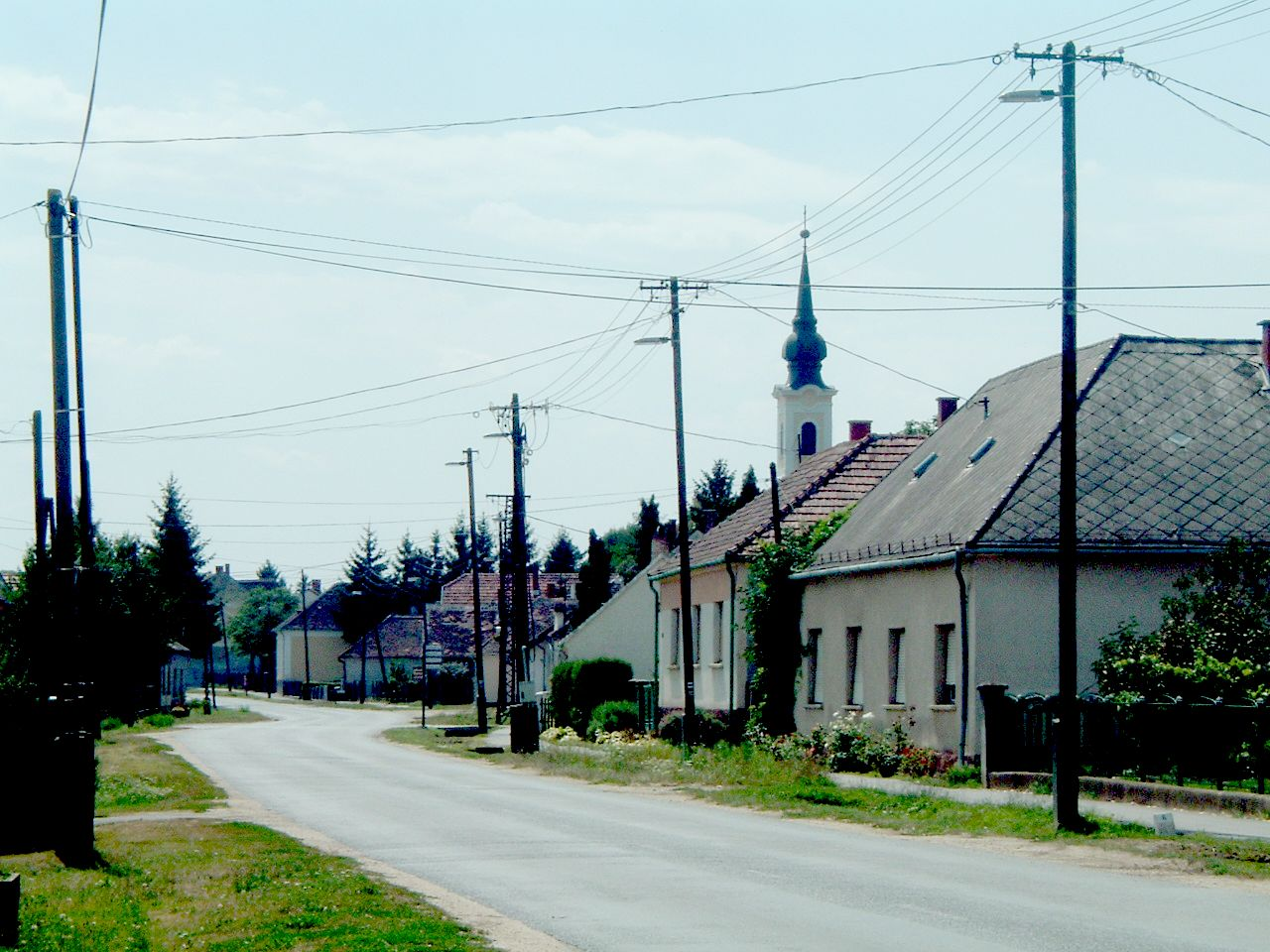

- Flag Coat of arms

- Location of Egyházasrádóc
- Coordinates: 47.08815°N 16.61603°E
- Country: Hungary
- Region: Western Transdanubia
- County: Vas
- District: Körmend

Area
  - Total: 24.79 km^{2} (9.57 sq mi)

Population (1 January 2025)
  - Total: 1,282
  - Density: 51.71/km^{2} (133.9/sq mi)
- Time zone: UTC+1 (CET)
  - Summer (DST): UTC+2 (CEST)
- Postal code: 9783
- Area code: (+36) 94
- Website: radochollos.hu

Egyházasrádóc is a village in Vas County, Hungary.
