= Ferenc Juhász (politician) =

Hungarian politician

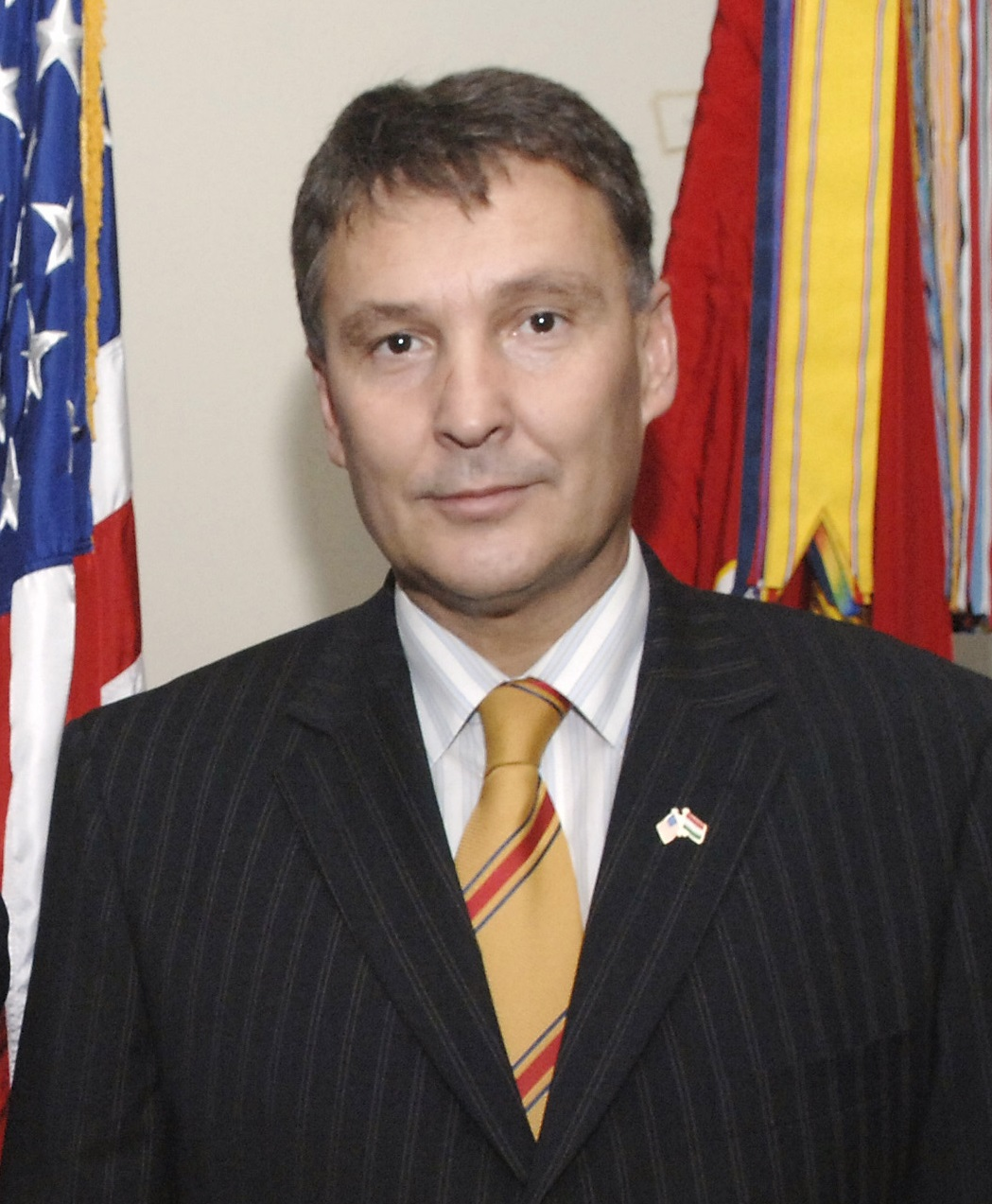

Minister of Defence of Hungary
- In office 27 May 2002 – 9 June 2006
- Prime Minister: Péter Medgyessy; Ferenc Gyurcsány
- Preceded by: János Szabó
- Succeeded by: Imre Szekeres

Personal details
- Born: 6 July 1960 (age 65) Nyíregyháza, People's Republic of Hungary
- Party: MSZP
- Children: Csilla Szendrák
- Profession: politician

Ferenc Juhász (born 6 July 1960 in Nyíregyháza) is a former Minister of Defence for Hungary. From 1990, he has been a member of the Hungarian Socialist Party (MSZP), and from 2000 the vice chairman of the party. He was the Minister of National Defense in Hungary from 27 May 2002 to 9 June 2006. He was also Member of Parliament between 1994 and 2014.

The Central Prosecutor's Office opened an investigation on suspicion of embezzlement against Juhász and his former State Secretary László Fapál on 13 July 2012. According to the indictment Juhász undersold a ministry-owned apartment to Fapál around 2005 or 2006, which caused an estimated damage of 43 million Ft to the Ministry of Defence. Juhász told MTI his accusation was "obviously acting on political pressure". In February 2014, both politicians were acquitted.

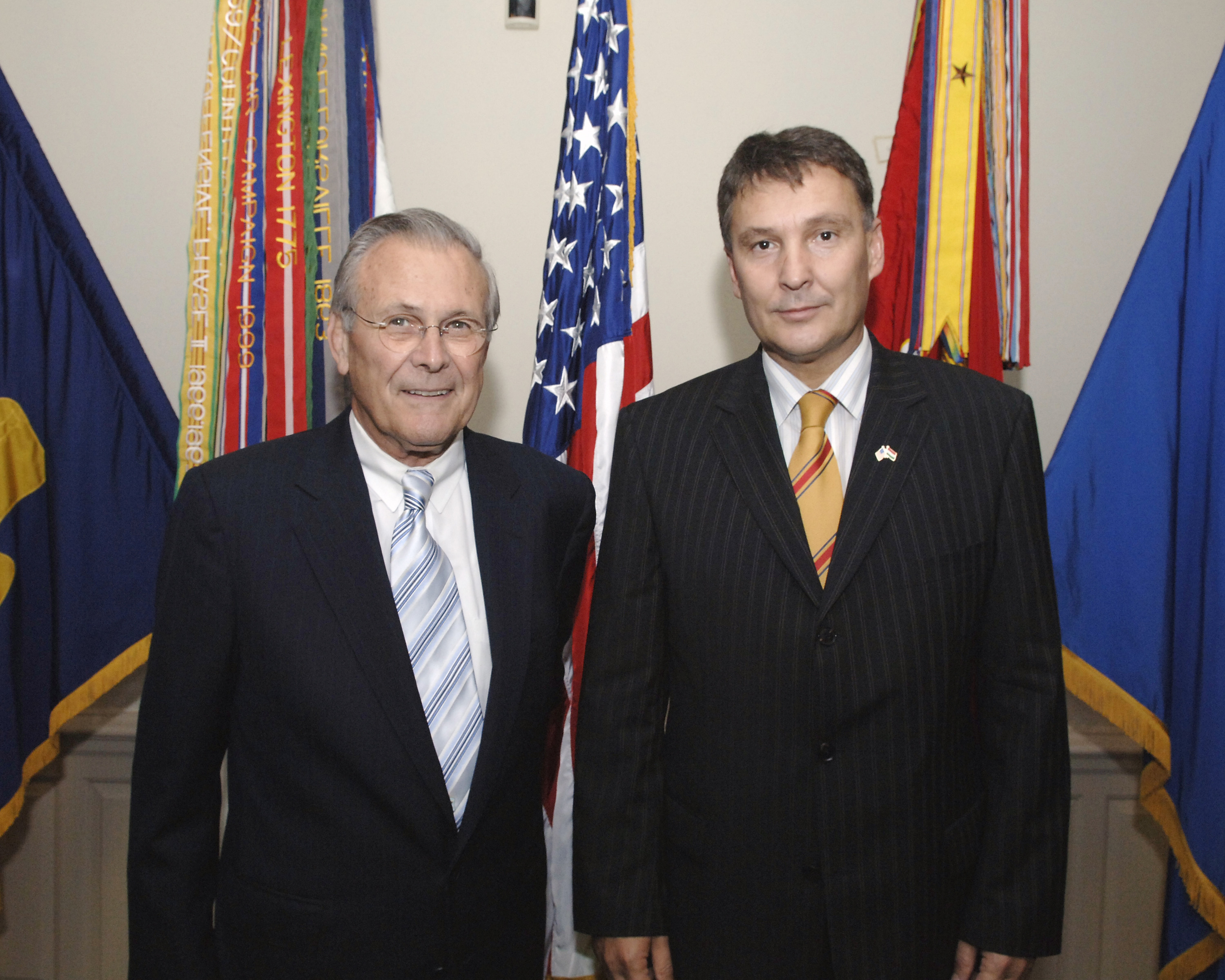
Juhász with U.S. Secretary of Defense Donald Rumsfeld in Washington, D.C., 6 October 2005

== Personal life ==
He is married. His wife is Csilla Szendrák.

== Sources ==
- www.juhaszferenc.hu

Political offices
| Preceded by János Szabó | Minister of Defence; 2002–2006 | Succeeded by Imre Szekeres |
