= Ľudovítová =

Ľudovítová Lajos
- Municipality
- Flag

- Location of Ľudovítová in the Nitra Region Location of Ľudovítová in Slovakia
- Coordinates: 48.40°N 18.08°E
- Country: Slovakia
- Region: Nitra Region
- District: Nitra District
- First mentioned: 1389

Area
  - Total: 1.87 km^{2} (0.72 sq mi)
- Elevation: 150 m (490 ft)

Population (2025)
  - Total: 233
- Time zone: UTC+1 (CET)
  - Summer (DST): UTC+2 (CEST)
- Postal code: 951 44
- Area code: +421 37
- Vehicle registration plate (until 2022): NR
- Website: www.ludovitova.sk

Ľudovítová (Hungarian: Lajos) is a small village and municipality in the Nitra District in western central Slovakia, in the Nitra Region.

== History ==
In historical records the village was first mentioned in 1389.

== Geography ==
The municipality lies at an altitude of 150 metres (490 ft) and covers an area of 1.87 km^{2} (0.72 sq mi) (2025).

== Population ==
Population statistic (10 years)
Year	1995	2005	2015	2025
Count	263	254	249	233
Difference		−3.42%	−1.96%	−6.42%

Population statistic
Year	2024	2025
Count	233	233
Difference		+0%

It has a population of 233 people (31 December 2025).

=== Ethnicity ===
Census 2021 (1+ %)
Ethnicity	Number	Fraction
Slovak	236	98.74%
Total	239	

In year 2021 was 239 people by ethnicity 236 as Slovak, 2 as Not found out, 1 as Moravian and 1 as Hungarian.

Note on population: The difference values of population numbers in the table "Population statistic" and in the sections "Ethnicity" & "Religion" is caused by the use of various statistical methods.

=== Religion ===
Census 2021 (1+ %)
Religion	Number	Fraction
Roman Catholic Church	175	73.22%
None	38	15.9%
Christian Congregations in Slovakia	11	4.6%
Greek Catholic Church	6	2.51%
Evangelical Church	5	2.09%
Total	239	

In year 2021 was 239 people by religion 175 from Roman Catholic Church, 38 from None, 11 from Christian Congregations in Slovakia, 6 from Greek Catholic Church, 5 from Evangelical Church, 2 from Not found out, 1 from Buddhism and 1 from Ad hoc movements.
