= Vilmos Böhm =

Hungarian ambassador and government minister

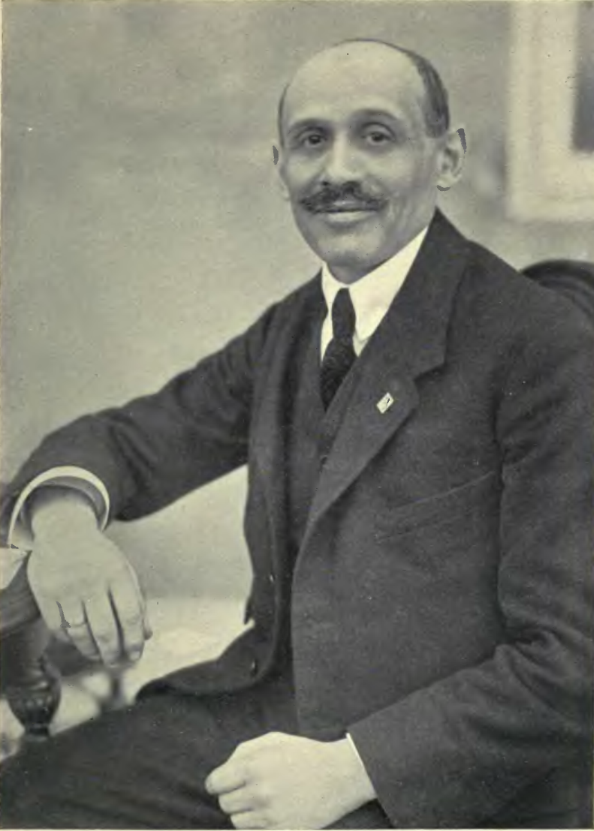
- Born: Vilmos Böhm; 6 January 1880; Budapest, Austria-Hungary
- Died: 28 October 1949 (aged 69); Stockholm, Sweden
- Citizenship: Hungarian
- Title: Minister of Defence of Hungary
- Parent(s): Lipót Böhm; Rozália Rosenzweig

Vilmos Böhm or Wilhelm Böhm (Hungarian: Böhm (improperly Bőhm) Vilmos; 6 January 1880 – 28 October 1949) was a Hungarian Social Democrat and Hungary's ambassador to Sweden after World War II.

He was born to a middle-class Jewish family. His parents were Lipót Böhm and Rozália Rosenzweig. Following the completion of his secondary education, he pursued a career as a mechanic. Böhm attained fluency in German during his early childhood. During the 1900s, he was employed as a technical officer. On 26 December 1905, he entered into matrimony with Mária Steiner, who also adhered to the Israelite religion and was the daughter of Ignác Steiner and Franciska Schwarz. He became involved in the labour movement at an early stage in his career, assuming the role of secretary of the National Federation of Iron and Metal Workers. In 1911, he was elected to the Trade Union Council. He was a member of the centre of MSZDP. In the course of the First World War, he was promoted to the rank of lieutenant. In 1918, he was arrested during the general strike. Böhm participated actively in the Aster Revolution of 1918, and in January 1919 he assumed the role of Minister of Defense in the Berinkey Government. In his capacity as Secretary of State, he extended an invitation to the war hero Aurél Stromfeld to meet with the military chief of staff. He participated actively in the unification congress of the Social Democrat Party and the Communist Party. In April, Böhm assumed the role of Commander-in-Chief of the Red Army. In May 1919, he submitted his resignation, which was not accepted by the government. Böhm maintained his membership. In July 1919, he was appointed as ambassador in Vienna. It is alleged that the individual in question is referenced in the Venona telegrams as a source of information for the Soviet Union during the war. Following the dissolution of the Hungarian Soviet Republic, he was compelled to seek refuge abroad, assuming a leadership role within a group of emigrant social democrats known as the "Light Group". This group was composed of individuals such as Zsigmond Kunfi and Sándor Garbai.

Following the year 1920, Böhm opted to remain in Vienna, thus becoming an integral component of the international social democratic movement. From 1934 onwards, he resided in Czechoslovakia, subsequently relocating to Sweden in 1938. It was not until 30 December 1945 that he returned to Hungary. Following his departure from the Hungarian Embassy on 1 May 1946, he resumed his diplomatic duties in Sweden, assuming the role of Ambassador of Hungary. Following the unification of the MSZDP and MKP parties, In 1948, Böhm relinquished his position and, consequently, his professional role. Thereafter, he pursued a new phase in his life as an emigrant in Stockholm. Following the revocation of his Hungarian citizenship on 3 June 1949, he died on 28 October 1949.

One researcher, Wilhelm Agrell, claimed he was a Soviet spy, a statement which was contested in a trial. A legal suit was initiated against Agrell by Eva, Thomas and Stefan Böhm, the grandchildren of the deceased, on the grounds of defamation. In accordance with Sweden's libel legislation, Agrell was found not guilty, despite the fact that he was unable to provide any additional evidence beyond the reference to Vilmos Böhm in the Venona telegrams, wherein numerous state leaders and politicians were identified under aliases.

Political offices
Preceded by Sándor Festetics	Minister of War; 1919	Succeeded by József Haubrich
Preceded by József Haubrich	People's Commissar of War in opposition:Miklós Horthy; 1919	Succeeded by József Haubrich
