= Károly Horváth =

Károly Horváth Horváth Károly
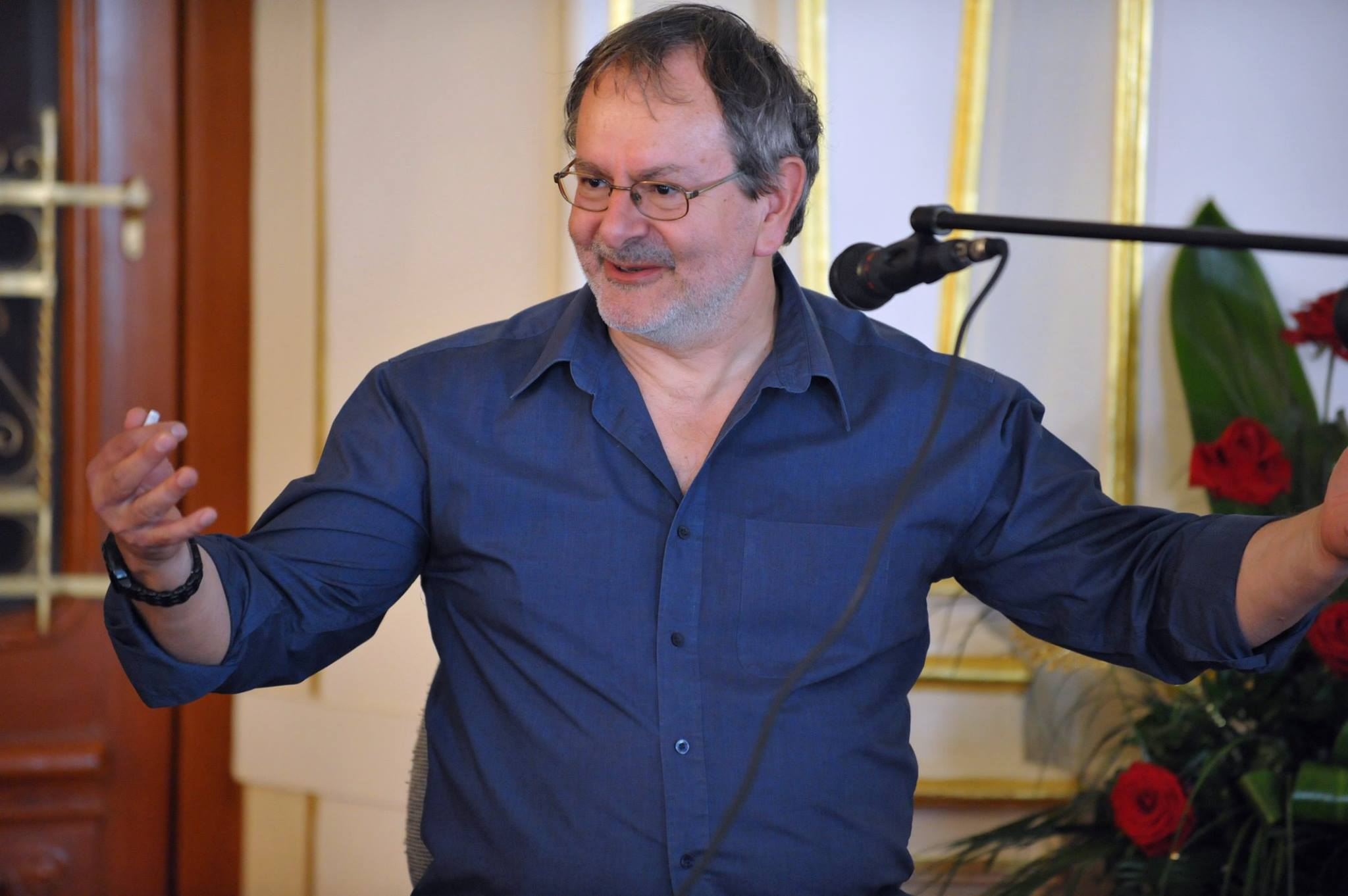

Background information
- Born: 26 October 1950; Oradea, Romania
- Died: 4 November 2015 (aged 65) Budapest, Hungary
- Genres: Folk music, country music, musical theatre
- Occupations: Musician, composer
- Instruments: Singing, cello, double bass, flute

Károly Horváth (26 October 1950 – 4 November 2015) was a Romanian-born composer and musician. He spent most of his professional life in Hungarian theatre.

== Biography ==
Born in Oradea, Horváth graduated from the Music Lyceum in 1970 and was awarded his degree by the National University of Music Bucharest. From 1975 he worked in Hungarian-language TV for a Bucharest television station. He founded Transylvania's first folk music bands, "Concord" and "Táltos". He also founded the "Tinodi" music band and the Sándor Tomcsa Theatre and helped found the Székelyudvarhely Festival.

From 1975 to 1987, he performed in theatre in both Romania and Hungary. In 1987 he relocated to Hungary. Until 1992 he toured Western Europe, North and South America, and Australia with the Mákvirág folk-együtteshez ("Poppy Folk Ensemble"). From 1992, he was primarily involved in musical theatre as a composer and musician, in Hungary, Transylvania and Vojvodina.

From 2005 to 2011 he was the musical director of the Griff Puppet Theatre, after which he became composer and director of music at the Sékesfehérvár Royal Games.

Horváth died in Budapest in 2015.

== Notable works ==
Horváth composed over 250 pieces of theatre accompaniment.

He worked with many famous Hungarian and European directors, including Jászai Prizewinner Árpád Árkosi, Jászai prizewinner Bértalan Bagó, Kossuth Prizewinner Géza Bereményi, Uniter Prizewinner Bradu Anca, Josef Denian, Uniter Prizewinner Victor Ioan Frunză, Jászai Prizewinner Imre Halasi, Jászai Prizewinner Pál Mácsai, Jászai Prizewinner Gábor Máté, Paolo Magelli, Jászai Prizewinner István Pinczés, Jaszai Prizewinner and Kossuth Prizewinners Béla Merő and József Ruszt, Istvan K. Szabó, Jászai Prizewinner János Szikora, Erdemes művész ("Merited Artist") Miklós Tompa, Péter Tömöry, and Jászai Prizewinner Csaba Tasnádi.

=== Musicals ===
- Horváth-Józsa-Tömöry: Síp a tökre (Hungarian State Theatre, Timișoara (Temesvár), 1978. Directed by Péter Tömöry)
- Horváth-Józsa: Leányrablás (György Harag Theatre, Sau Mare (Szatmárnémeti), 1998, Directed by István Pinczés)
- Horváth-Tömöry: Nőpápa (Áron Tamási Theatre, Sfântu Gheorghe (Sesiszentgyörgy), 2000. Directed by Péter Tömöry)
- Horváth-Bereményi: Laura (Sándor Hevesi Theatre, Zalaegerszeg, 2005. Directed by Bertalan Bagó, József Katona Theatre, Kecskemét, 2006, Directed by István Pinczés)
- Horváth-Tömöry: Vőlegényfogó (Sándor Tomcsa Theatre, 2006. Directed by Péter Tömöry)
- Horváth-Tömöry: Canterbury mesék (Sándor Hevesi Theatre, 2006. Directed by István K. Szabó)
- Horváth Károly-Tömöry Péter: Ludas Matyi (bábopera, Griff bábtheatre, Directed by László Rumi)

=== Theatrical accompaniment ===
- Áron Tamási: Vitéz lélek (Sfântu Gheorghe (Sesiszentgyörgy) 1978. Directed by Miklós Tompa )
- Ferenc Sütőx: Szuzai mennyegző (Sfântu Gheorghe (Sesiszentgyörgy), 1980, Directed by Attila Seprődi Kiss)
- Bertolt Brecht: Der kaukasische Kreidekreis (Bruchsal, 1993. Directed by Péter Tömöry)
- Mihály Vörösmarty: Csongor és Tünde (Timișoara (Temesvár), 1995. Directed by Béla Merő)
- Witold Gombrowicz: Operett (Debrecen, 1995. Directed by István Pinczés)
- Ferenc Molnár: Liliom (Zalaegerszeg, 1997. Directed by Paolo Magelli)
- Alfred de Musset: Lorenzaccio (Timișoara (Temesvár), 1999. V. Ioan Frunza)
- William Shakespeare: Visul unei nopţi de vară (Cluj-Napoca (Kolozsvár), 1999. Directed by V. Ioan Frunza)
- William Shakespeare: Romeo şi Julieta (Sau Mare (Szatmárnémeti), 1998. Directed by Péter Tömöry)
- Fassbinder: A szenny, a város és a halál (Der Müll, die Stadt und der Tod) (Veszprém, 2002. Directed by Péter Tömöry)
- Zsigmond Móricz: Uri muri (Zalaegerszeg, 2003)
- Fyodor Dostoyevsky: Az idióta (József Katona Theatre, Budapest, 2003. Directed by Máthé Gábor)
- Molière: Don Juan (Zalaegerszeg, 2004. Directed by Bertalan Bagó)
- William Shakespeare: Hamlet (Festival d'Avignon, 2004. Directed by Bradu Anca)
- Magda Szabó: Az ajtó (Zalaegeszeg, 2005. Directed by Géza Bereményi)
- Matei Vișniec: A kommunizmus története elmebetegeknek (Újvidék, 2006. Directed by Bradu Anca)
- István Tasnádi: Magyar zombi (Zalaegerszeg, 2006. Directed by Bertalan Bagó)
- Géza Bereményi: Az arany ára (Bárka Theatre, Budapest, 2007. Directed by Bertalan Bagó)
- István Tasnádi: Finito (Örkény Theatre, Budapest, 2007. Directed by Pál Mácsai)
- Jean Cocteau: Vásott kölykök (Székelyudvarhely, 2007. Directed by István K. Szabó)
- William Shakespeare: III. Richárd (Zalaegerszeg, 2008. Directed by Bertalan Bagó)
- Nikolai Gogol: Revizor (Zalaegerszeg, 2009. Directed by Bertalan Bagó)
- Ödön von Horváth: Kazimir és Karolin (Oradea (Nagyvárad), 2009. Directed by Bradu Anca)
- Antal Szerb: Az utas és a holdvilág (Zalaegerszeg, 2009. Directed by Bertalan Bagó)

=== Films ===
- Baloane de curcubeu (1982, Directed by Josef Demian)
- Piciu (1983, Directed by Josef Demian)
- Lovind o pasăre de pradă (1984, Directed by Josef Demian)
- Bordal (documentary, 1996, Directed by László Zöldi)
- Tündér Ilona (TV film, 1998, Directed by Gábor Katalin)
- Vasúti variációk (1998, Directed by László Zöldi)
- Én itt maradok (2000, Directed by Zoltán Seregi)
- Ellenpontok (2001, Directed by Zoltán Seregi)
- Vadászat angolokra (2006, Directed by Bertalan Bagó)
- Irodalom ( Az ünnep (2009, Directed by Zsuzsa Lőrincz)
- Régimódi történet ( Directed by Géza Bereményi)
- Caligula helytartója (2012, Directed by Bertalan Bagó)
- EMKE- volt egyszer egy kávéház (2013, Directed by Bertalan Bagó)

=== Puppetry ===
- Hamupipőke (Directed by László Uray)
- Peter Tömöry: Harcos-karcos betlehemes (Directed by Péter Galambos)
- Zsuzsa Lőrincz: Bazika (Directed by Zsuzsa Lőrincz)
- Péter Tömöry: Titkos álom (Directed by Tömöry)
- László Bagossy: A sötétben látó tündér (Directed by Csaba Pénzes)
- Katalin Scheer: Nefelé (Directed by Árpád Árkosi)
- Petőfi: János Vitéz (Directed by István Pinczés)
- László Upor: Éljen Kinoppió (Directed by István Pinczés )
- Béla Pintér: Sütemények királynője (Directed by Zsuzsa Lőrincz)

=== Recordings ===
- Kettőspont (Bucharest, 1978)
- Zenés Karaván (Bucharest, 1979)
- Táltos ének (Bucharest, 1984)
- Mákvirág in Brasil (São Paulo, 1988)
- Békesség (Edinburgh, 1990)
- Téli népszokások (Udine, 1991)
- Fire Sermon (Odorheiu Secuiesc (Székelyudvarhely), 2004)

=== Awards ===
- 1971: Siculus Fesztivál, Odorheiu Secuiesc (Székelyudvarhely)
- 1972: Siculus Fesztivál, Odorheiu Secuiesc (Székelyudvarhely)
- 2008: Kritikusok díja a Finito zenéjéért ("Critics' Award for Fine Music"), Budapest
