= Portrait of Ferenc Kölcsey (Anton Einsle) =

1835 painting by Anton Einsle

- Kölcsey Ferenc arcképe (Hungarian)
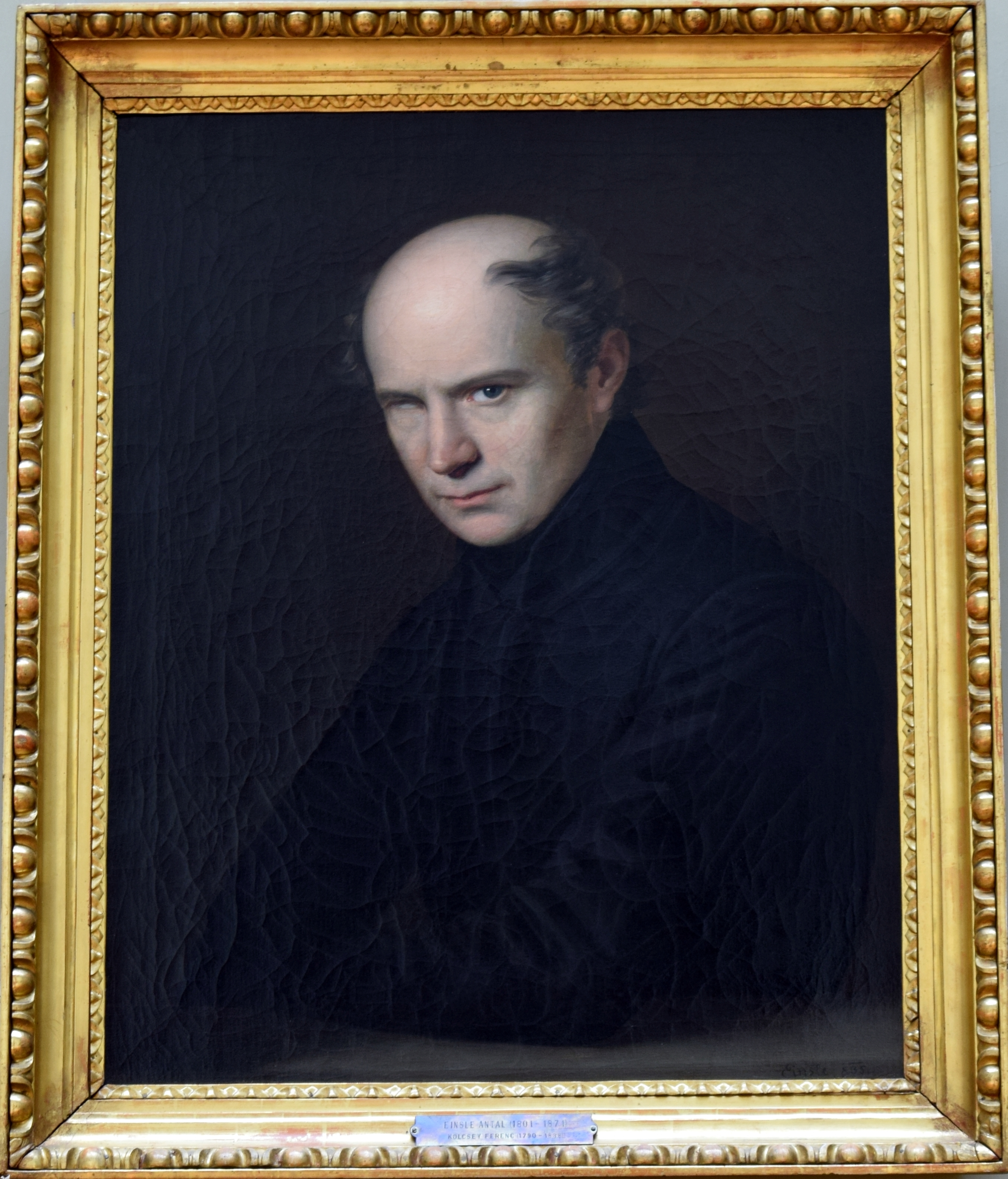
- Artist: Anton Einsle
- Year: 1835
- Type: oil on canvas
- Dimensions: 65 cm × 52.5 cm (26 in × 20.7 in)
- Location: Hungarian Academy of Sciences, Budapest

The Portrait of Ferenc Kölcsey (Hungarian: Kölcsey Ferenc arcképe) is a painting by Anton Einsle in the Art Collection of the Hungarian Academy of Sciences in Budapest. It is a well known portrait of Ferenc Kölcsey, a leading Hungarian poet, literary critic, orator, and politician in the Reform Era, who wrote the Himnusz, the national anthem of Hungary.

== History ==
The idea of the portrait painting emerged for the first time in a letter written by the literary critic Ferenc Toldy to Kölcsey on 10 December 1834. There is a passing mention that Kölcsey was going to visit his friend, the poet József Bajza in Pest on his way towards Pozsony and there he was going to sit for a portrait. The original idea obviously came from Bajza. Kölcsey was 45 years old at the time when the portrait was created. He had served as deputy of Szatmár County in the Diet of Hungary until 1835. As poet, literary critic and member of the academy he was well-respected. On his way back from Pozsony to Szatmár he stayed in Pest again in the spring of 1835. There he had time to sit for the portrait again. The artist, Anton Einsle had been living in Pest since 1832 as court painter to Archduke Joseph, the Palatine of Hungary.

The portrait was made for the 1836 issue of Aurora, the prestigious literary almanac of the Reform Era whose editor was József Bajza. György Kilián, the publisher of the magazine wrote that "the portrait, painted by Einsle for this purpose, turned out perfect". Johann Ender copied it in drawing but in the end the almanac was published without the engraving because "the engraver was not able to recreate on the steel the beauty and the livingness of the original", as the publishers explained it to the public. Bajza wrote a private letter to Kölcsey on 17 January 1836: "The Aurora was published but without the image of my dear friend, because the engraver could not make his work done properly as I wished. [...] I respect my friend and the public more than publishing such a mediocre engraving, especially that the original painting by Einsle was executed with a great finesse". The drawing was sent to Weimar to Carl August Schwerdgeburth who made a new engraving that was published subsequently.

The original portrait was purchased by László Bártfay, a lawyer who served as the treasury superintendent of the Hungarian Academy of Sciences. Bártfay and Kölcsey were friends with common literary interests although Bártfay remained a dilettante. After Bártfay's death in 1858 the painting was inherited by his widow, Jozefin Mauks, although Bártfay gave it to the Academy of Sciences in his will; the institution received the artwork in 1860.

== Description ==
The friends of the poet thought that the portrait captured his troubled and serious character very well. "At the time my poor, since deceased friend were on his way back to home after the unpleasantries of the diet", wrote Bártfay in a letter in 1839, more than three years after Kölcsey's sudden death. "The colour of learning and weariness, pallor was conspicuous on his face, this is the colour on my painting, showing him ill." In his diary Bártfay disclosed other details: "my painting was his only portrait [in his life], it shows him with a slightly bowed head and neck, that was his natural posture."

The painter did not to hide the fact that Kölcsey's right eye was blind, he was almost totally bald and his head was too large in proportion to his body. Despite his obvious physical flaws the face still conveys a compelling inner strength, seriousness and a sense of vocation.

== Sources ==
- Hungarian Academy of Sciences - information provided on the permanent exhibition
