= Flare path =

Flare path may refer to:

- an illuminated runway in military terminology
- Flare Path, a play by Terence Rattigan set near an RAF base
