= Béla Vörösmarty =

Hungarian politician (1844–1904)

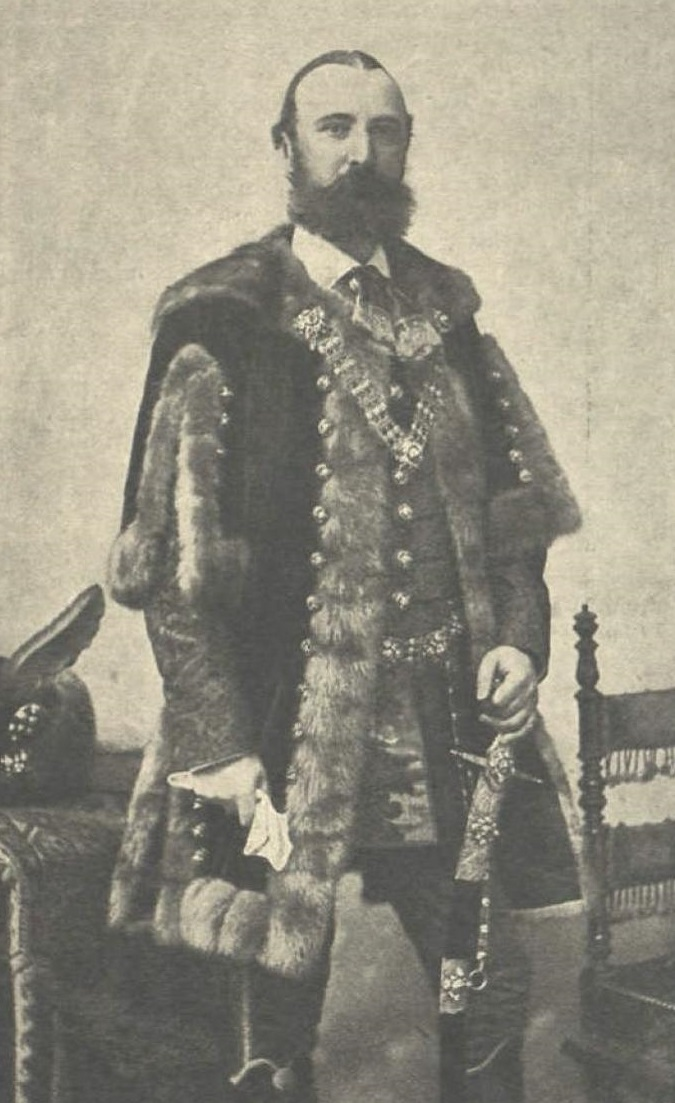
- Béla Vörösmarty in 1899 (Vasárnapi Újság); Photograph by the Károly Koller studios
- Born: 23 April 1844; Pest, Hungary
- Died: 9 October 1904 (aged 60); Budapest, Austria-Hungary
- Father: Mihály Vörösmarty
- Mother: Laura Csajághy

Béla Vörösmarty (23 April 1844 – 9 October 1904) was a Hungarian jurist and politician, son of poet Mihály Vörösmarty and Laura Csajághy and brother of Ilona Vörösmarty.

== Biography ==
After his father's death in 1855, he raised in the home of Ferenc Deák. He finished his secondary and legal studies in Budapest. After that he worked as a judge for the Royal Court of Budapest since 1868. He became a member of the Curia Regia in 1887. He was appointed President of the Royal Court of Győr in 1895, replacing Sándor Erdély who became Minister of Justice.

Vörösmarty was elected Secretary of State for Justice under Minister Erdély in that year. He served as Member of Parliament for Nyitrazsámbokrét (today: Žabokreky nad Nitrou, Slovakia) between 1899 and 1901. He was appointed Vice President of the Curia Regia in 1901, replacing Bódog Czorda.

== Sources ==
- MAGYAR ORSZÁGGYŰLÉSI ALMANACH (1901-1906)
- Magyar életrajzi lexikon
- Vörösmarty családja és utódai
