= Szózat =

Hungarian patriotic song, secondary unofficial anthem

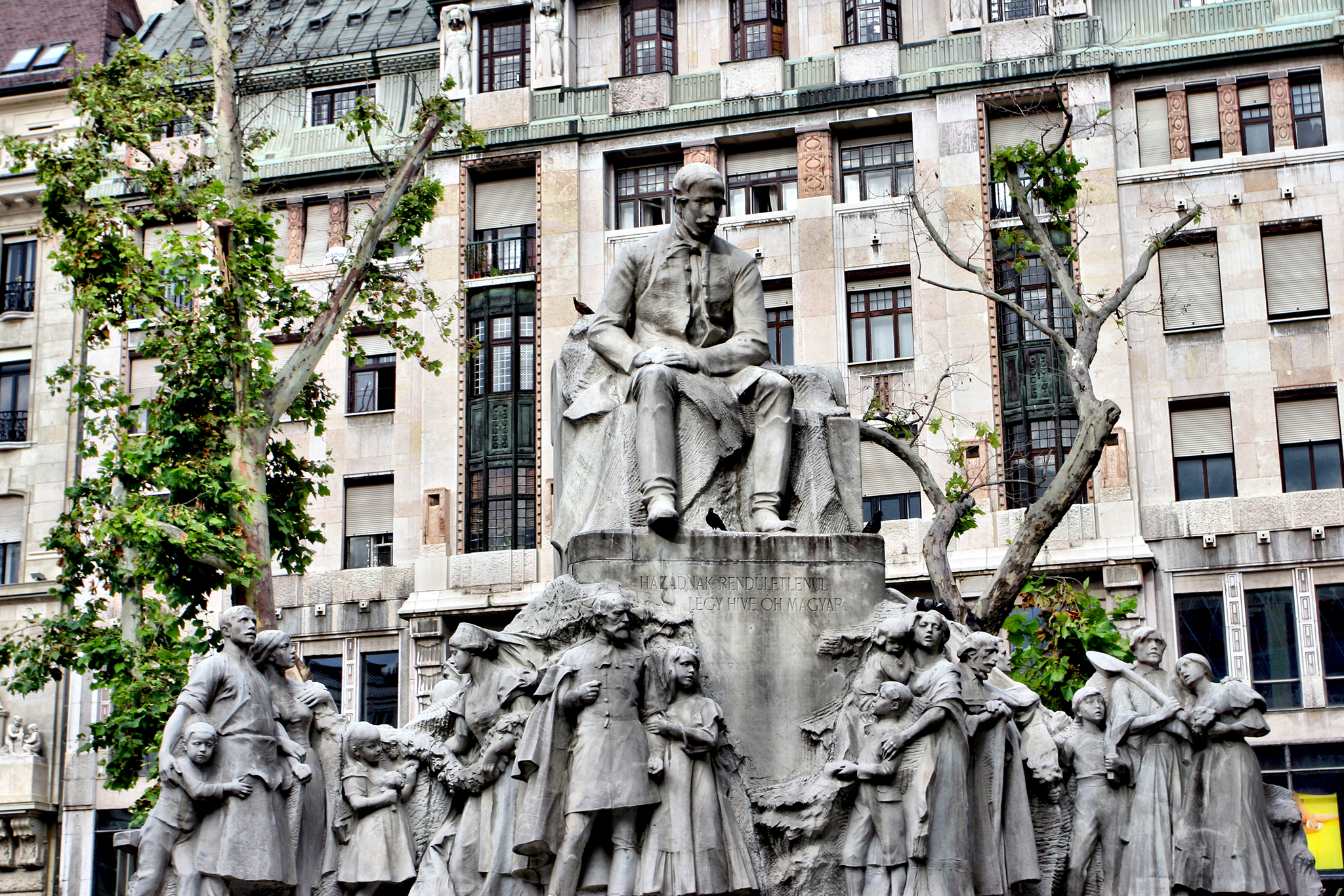
Monument to Vörösmarty in Budapest, featuring the opening lines of the "Szózat"

"Szózat" (Note: Hungarian pronunciation: [ˈsoːzɒt]) (English: "The Appeal") is a Hungarian patriotic song. De facto, it is regarded as "the second national anthem" of Hungary, beside "Himnusz", which is a constitutionally defined state symbol.

The lyrics were written in 1836 by Mihály Vörösmarty and set to music in 1840 by Béni Egressy for an award offered by András Bartay, head of the National Theatre. It was first performed in the National Theatre on 10 May 1843. There was a fierce debate at the time whether "Szózat" or "Himnusz" was supposed to be the anthem of the country.

== Comparison to "Himnusz" ==
The title of Vörösmarty's work defines the situation: it is a speech, oration of a raconteur (the poet) to the Hungarian people. Although Vörösmarty's "Szózat" touches similar thoughts as Ferenc Kölcsey's "Himnusz", even as continuing his train of thought, its intonation is entirely different. "Himnusz" (Hymn) is a prayer, but "Szózat" acts rather like a speech, addressing the listener/reader by the narrator in the role of an orator. Furthermore, as a prayer, "Himnusz" becomes almost a begging for the last verse, while "Szózat" is much more uplifting, unfaltering, inspiring for patriotism and loyalty. However, it also reckons with the concerns of "Himnusz", sees the death of the nation as a possibility: "Or it will come, if it must come, The glorious death". At the same time it finds possible the coming of a better era: "There yet shall come ... that better, fairer day". The poem deals with the past in three, with the future in six verses.

== Lyrics ==
It was translated to English by Watson Kirkconnell, a Canadian writer and academic.

Hungarian
Hazádnak rendületlenűl
Légy híve, oh magyar;
Bölcsőd az s majdan sírod is,
Mely ápol s eltakar.

A nagy világon e kívül
Nincsen számodra hely;
Áldjon vagy verjen sors keze:
Itt élned, halnod kell.

Ez a föld, melyen annyiszor
Apáid vére folyt;
Ez, melyhez minden szent nevet
Egy ezredév csatolt.

Itt küzdtenek honért a hős
Árpádnak hadai;
Itt törtek össze rabigát
Hunyadnak karjai.

Szabadság! itten hordozák
Véres zászlóidat,
S elhulltanak legjobbjaink
A hosszú harc alatt.

És annyi balszerencse közt,
Oly sok viszály után,
Megfogyva bár, de törve nem,
Él nemzet e hazán.

S népek hazája, nagy világ!
Hozzád bátran kiált:
"Egy ezredévi szenvedés
Kér éltet vagy halált!"

Az nem lehet hogy annyi szív
Hiába onta vért,
S keservben annyi hű kebel
Szakadt meg a honért.

Az nem lehet, hogy ész, erő,
És oly szent akarat
Hiába sorvadozzanak
Egy átoksúly alatt.

Még jőni kell, még jőni fog
Egy jobb kor, mely után
Buzgó imádság epedez
Százezrek ajakán.

Vagy jőni fog, ha jőni kell,
A nagyszerű halál,
Hol a temetkezés fölött
Egy ország vérben áll.

S a sírt, hol nemzet sűlyed el,
Népek veszik körűl,
S az ember millióinak
Szemében gyászköny űl.

Légy híve rendületlenűl
Hazádnak, oh magyar:
Ez éltetőd, s ha elbukál,
Hantjával ez takar.

A nagy világon e kivűl
Nincsen számodra hely;
Áldjon vagy verjen sors keze:
Itt élned, halnod kell.

Literal translation
To your homeland without fail
Be faithful, O Hungarian!
It is your cradle and will your grave be
Which nurses, and will bury you.

In the great world outside of here
There is no place for you
May fortune's hand bless or beat you
Here you must live and die!

This soil on which so many times
Your fathers' blood flowed
This, to which, every holy name
One thousand years has coupled

Here fought for home the hero
Arpad's hosts
Here broke apart the prisoner's yoke
Hunyadi's arms

Freedom! Here is carried
Your bloody standard
And our best were felled
During the long war

And through so much ill fortune
After many feuds,
Though depleted, but not broken
The nation lives on this homeland.

And home of the nations, great earth!
Shouts bravely to you:
"A thousand years of suffering
demands life or death!"

It cannot be, that so many hearts
Uselessly spilled their blood
And in vain, so many faithful hearts
Were broken for the homeland.

It cannot be that mind, might
And so holy a will
Would uselessly wither
Under the weight of a curse;

It still needs to come, it still will come
A better age, for which
Fervent prayer yearns
On hundreds of thousands' lips.

Or it will come, if it must come
The glorious death
Where above the funeral
A nation wallows in blood

And the grave, where the nation is lowering,
Nations surround
And in the millions of peoples'
Eyes, a tear of mourning wells.

Be faithful, without fail
To your homeland, O Hungarian:
This is your succour, and if you fall
With its grave it covers you

In the great world outside of here
There is no place for you
May fortune's hand bless or beat you
Here you must live and die!

Lyrical translation
Oh, Magyar, keep immovably
your native country's trust,
for it has borne you, and at death
will consecrate your dust!

No other spot in all the world
can touch your heart as home—
let fortune bless or fortune curse,
from hence you shall not roam!

This is the country that your sires
have shed their blood to claim;
throughout a thousand years not one
but adds a sacred name.

'Twas here brave Árpád's mighty sword
ordained your land to be,
and here the arms of Hunyad broke
the chains of slavery.

Here Freedom's blood-stained flag has waved
above the Magyar head;
and here in age-long struggles fell
our best and noblest, dead.

In spite of long calamity
and centuries of strife,
our strength, though weakened, is not spent;
our country still has life.

To you, O nations of the world,
we call with passioned breath:
"Should not a thousand years of pain
bring liberty—or death?"

It cannot be that all in vain
so many hearts have bled,
that haggard from heroic breasts
so many souls have fled!

It cannot be that mind and strength
and consecrated will
are wasted in a hopeless cause
beneath a curse of ill!

There yet shall come, if come there must,
that better, fairer day
for which a myriad thousand lips
in fervent yearning pray.

Or there shall come, if come there must,
a death of fortitude;
and round about our graves shall stand
a nation washed in blood.

Around the graves where we shall die
a weeping world will come,
and millions will in pity gaze
upon the martyrs' tomb.

Then, Magyar, keep unshakeably
your native country's trust,
for it has borne you and at death
will consecrate your dust!

No other spot in all the world
can touch your heart as home;
let fortune bless or fortune curse,
from hence you shall not roam!
