= Emma Handy =

British actress (born 1974)

Emma Handy (born 24 March 1974) is a British actress best known for her West End stage work and her role as DC Paula McIntyre in the ITV1 award-winning drama series Wire in the Blood in which she appeared for five series.

== Early life ==
Handy trained at the London Academy of Music and Dramatic Art (LAMDA). During the summer of her second year she was invited to Hungary to play the leading role in the first English translation of Csongor és Tünde by Peter Zollman at the Merlin International Theatre, Budapest.

== Career ==
During her final year at drama school Handy was offered the part of Yuliya in a new translation of Chekhov's The Wood Demon by Frank Dwyer at the Playhouse Theatre in London's West End. She went straight onto the Royal Shakespeare Company to play Jessica in Merchant of Venice and to create the role of Rhona in the premiere of Robert Holman's Bad Weather.

Much of Handy's stage work has been involved with new writing creating many roles including Anna Van Gogh in Nicholas Wright's multi award-winning play Vincent in Brixton directed by Richard Eyre for the Royal National Theatre; Rhona in Robert Holman's Bad Weather directed by Steven Pimlott for the Royal Shakespeare Company; Lou in Murray Gold's 50 Revolutions directed by Dominic Dromgoole for the Trafalgar Studios and Cathy in Polly Teale's award-winning Speechless for Shared Experience at the Traverse Theatre, Edinburgh.

Handy played Maudie Miller in Trevor Nunn's 2011 revival of Flare Path at the Theatre Royal Haymarket marking the centenary of Terence Rattigan's birth.

In January 2013, she performed at the Adelaide Festival in Australia in the premiere of Thursday by the acclaimed playwright Bryony Lavery (Frozen) in a collaboration with Australian-based theatre company Brink Productions and English Touring Theatre.

Handy performed a lead role, the young Queen Elizabeth ll, 'Liz' in Moira Buffini's critically acclaimed play Handbagged examining the relationship between the Queen and prime minister Margaret Thatcher. The production toured the UK in 2015, including performances at the Theatre Royale in Bath, the Cambridge Arts Theatre, and also at the Everyman Theatre in Cheltenham. In 2016, Handy talked about playing the queen in an interview timed to coincide with the monarch's 90th birthday.

In 2021, Handy played the role of Ida in the BBC Radio 4 drama series Faith, Hope and Glory.

== Filmography ==
=== Television ===
Year	Title	Role	Notes
2000	Black Cab	Jem	TV series
2000	Pretending to be Judith	Keeley	2 episodes
2001	The Bill	Lisa Hayes	Episode: "Real Crime"
2002	The American Embassy	Jules Brody	TV series
2002	The Bill	Jodie White	1 episode
−2002	Innocents	Nurse	TV movie
2003	Hear the Silence	Ann	TV movie
−2003	Vincent in Brixton	Anna Van Gogh	TV movie
2004	William and Mary	Tracy Mellor	4 episodes
2004	Silent Witness	DS Gwenda Newton	2 episodes
2004	See Me	Jo	TV movie
2005	Beneath the Skin	Louisa	TV movie
2003–2008	Wire in the Blood	DC Paula McIntyre	24 episodes
2010	Doctors	Linda Stow	4 episodes
2011	Threesome	Dr Cartwright	TV series
2011	Holby City	Katie Blakeman	Episode "See You on the Ice"
2016	The Coroner	Debbie Patterson	Episode: "Crash"
2016	The Worst Witch	Mrs Hallow	3 episodes
2017	Doctor Who	Mother	Episode: "The Lie of the Land"
2015-2022	Doc Martin	Samantha Trappett	7 episodes
2023	The Beaker Girls	Mrs Cook	Series regular

=== Film ===
Year	Title	Role	Director
1997	Velvet Goldmine	Jean	Todd Haynes
2001	Iris	PC Keaton	Richard Eyre
2002	Club Le Monde	Ra	Simon Rumley
2003	Vacuums	Marge	Luke Cresswell & Steve McNicholas
2003	Vincent in Brixton	Anna Van Gogh	Richard Eyre
2006	Balham vs Clapham	Emily	Tom Yarwood
2012	Fast Girls	Rebecca- Team GB Official	Regan Hall

=== Theatre ===
Year	Title	Author	Role	Director	Notes
1996	Csongor és Tünde	Peter Zollman	Tunde	Lazlo Magacs	Merlin International Theatre, Budapest
1997	The Wood Demon	Anton Chekhov	Yuliya	Anthony Clark	The Playhouse Theatre, London
1997–1999	Twelfth Night	William Shakespeare	Lady in Waiting	Adrian Noble	Royal Shakespeare Company
1997–1999	The Merchant of Venice	William Shakespeare	Jessica	Gregory Doran	Royal Shakespeare Company
1997–1999	Bad Weather	Robert Holman	Rhona	Steven Pimlott	Royal Shakespeare Company
1999	50 Revolutions	Murray Gold	Lou	Dominic Dromgoole	Trafalgar Studios
2002–2003	Vincent in Brixton	Nicholas Wright	Anna Van Gogh	Richard Eyre	National Theatre London, Wyndham's Theatre London, Playhouse Theatre, London
2007	A Midsummer Night's Dream	William Shakespeare	Hermia	Tito Celestino da Costa	International Opera Festival, Lisbon
2008	Crown Matrimonial	Royce Ryton	Elizabeth, Duchess of York	David Grindley	ACT Productions
2009	Edward Gant's Amazing Feats of Loneliness	Anthony Neilson	Madame Poulet	Steve Marmion	Headlong
2010	"Speechless"	Polly Teale	Cathy	Polly Teale	Shared Experience, Traverse Theatre Edinburgh
2011	Flare Path	Terence Rattigan	Maudie Miller	Trevor Nunn	Haymarket Theatre, London
2012	The Boy who Fell into a Book	Alan Ayckbourn	Monique	Steve Marmion	Soho Theatre
2013	"Thursday"	Bryony Lavery	Bonita D'Olivera	Chris Drummond	ETT and BRINK Productions for the Adelaide Festival, Australia
2014	"Miss Julie"	August Strindberg / Rebecca Lenkiewicz	Kristin	Jamie Glover Minerva Theatre, Chichester Festival	
2015	"Handbagged"	Moira Buffini	Liz	Indhu Rubasingham	UK tour
