= Ferenc Kölcsey =

Hungarian politician and writer (1790–1838)

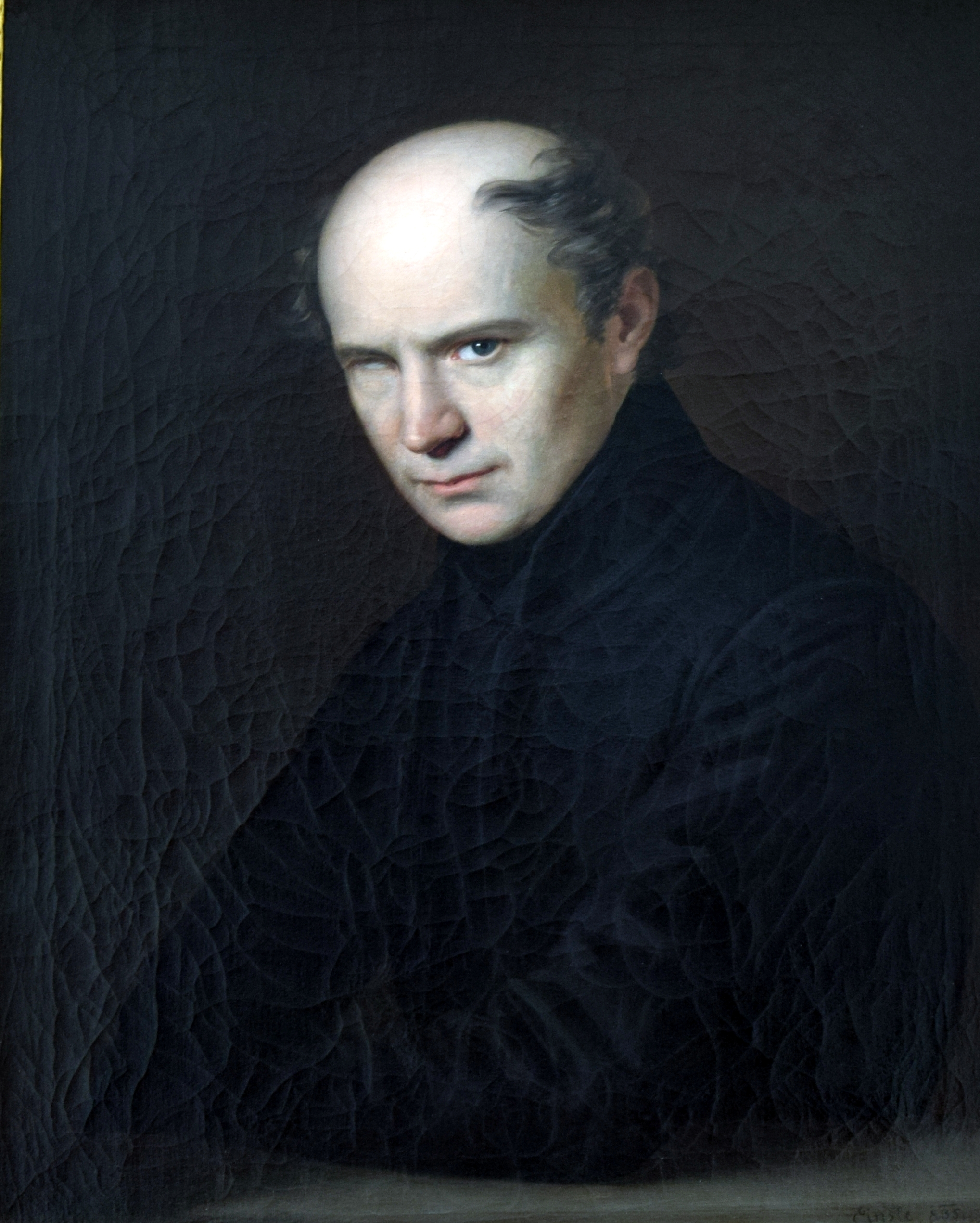
Portrait of Ferenc Kölcsey by Anton Einsle, 1835

Coat of arms of his family

Ferenc Kölcsey (archaically English: Francis Kolcsey; 8 August 1790 – 24 August 1838) was a Hungarian poet, literary critic, orator, and politician, noted for his support of the liberal current in Hungary regarding the politics involving the Austrian Empire. He wrote "Himnusz", the national anthem of Hungary in 1823.

== Biography ==
Kölcsey was born in Sződemeter, Hungary (now Săuca, Romania) into an old Hungarian noble family, which originated from the gens (clan) Szentemágócs. He was orphaned at an early age and handicapped by the loss of an eye to smallpox. At age fifteen, he made the acquaintance of Ferenc Kazinczy and adopted his linguistic reforms. In 1809, Kölcsey went to Pest and became a notary to the Royal board. He was disenchanted with the office, and, while in Szatmárcseke, he devoted his time to aesthetical study, poetry, criticism, and the defense of Kazinczy's theories.

Kölcsey's early metrical pieces contributed to the Transylvanian Museum did not attract much attention, while his severe criticisms of Mihály Csokonai Vitéz, János Kis, and especially Dániel Berzsenyi, published in 1817, rendered him very unpopular. From 1821 to 1826, he published many separate poems of great beauty in the Aurora, Hebe, Aspasia, and other magazines of polite literature. He joined Pál Szemere in a new periodical, styled Élet és Literatúra (Life and Literature), which appeared from 1826 to 1829, in 4 volumes, and gained for Kölcsey the highest reputation as a critical writer.

From 1832 to 1835, he sat in the Hungarian Diet, where his extreme liberal views and his eloquence soon rendered him famous as a parliamentary leader. Elected on 17 November 1830 as a member of the Hungarian Academy of Sciences, he took part in its first grand meeting. In 1832, he delivered his famous oration on Kazinczy, and then, in 1836, on his former opponent Dániel Berzsenyi. In 1838, when the opposition leader Miklós Wesselényi was thrown into prison upon a disputed charge of treason, Kölcsey conducted his defense with noted eloquence, but without success. He died about a week afterwards at Szatmárcseke, from internal inflammation.

Kölcsey's strong moral sense and deep devotion to his country are reflected in his poems, his often severe but masterly literary criticism, and his funeral orations and parliamentary speeches. His collected works, in 6 volumes, were published at Pest, 1840–1848, and his journal of the Diet of 1832–1836 appeared in 1848. The first collected edition of all his works appeared in 1886–87.

A monument erected to the memory of Kölcsey was unveiled at Szatmárnémeti on 25 September 1864. His poem "Himnusz" (1823), evoking the glory of Hungary's past, became the national anthem of Hungary.

== Personal life ==
Kölcsey never married and had no documented relationships; based on some of the intimate letters Kölcsey wrote to his male contemporaries, literary historian Krisztián Nyáry theorized that Kölcsey may have been homosexual. Literary historian István Margócsy in Magyar Narancs and Writer Nóra Szendi in Hvg.hu, disagreed with these claims. Margócsy wrote, "I have a problem with this, Krisztián, that you present assumptions as true stories. Love is the most mysterious phenomenon in the world, and telling rounded stories about the complicated emotional and sexual relationships of people who lived long ago is extremely risky" while Szendi wrote, "Krisztián Nyáry treats it as a fact that the author of the Anthem felt a burning love for a man, even though this cannot be proven at all based on the customs and language of the time, claims our literary researcher. The kiss between men appears several times in various correspondences from the Reformation period, which does not mean, however, that the characters were gay."

== Selected works ==
- Vanitatum Vanitas 1823.
- "Himnusz" 1823. The national anthem of Hungary
- Huszt 1831. Epigram

== Honors ==
- Ferenc Kölcsey stamp were issued by Hungary on 5 May 1937.
- On 3 August 1990 another postage stamp was issued.
