= Săuca =

- Commune
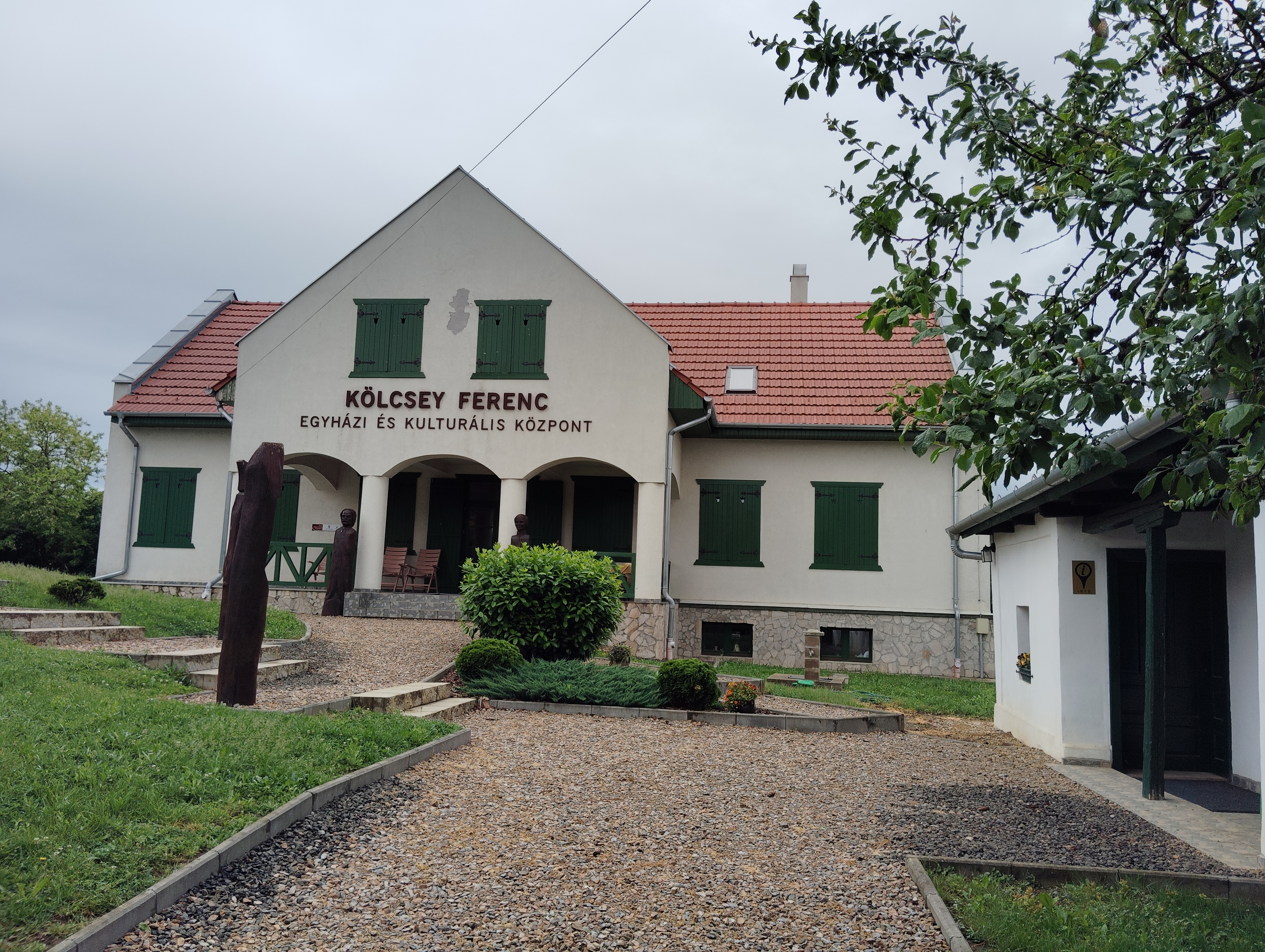
- Ferenc Kölcsey Church and Cultural Center in Săuca

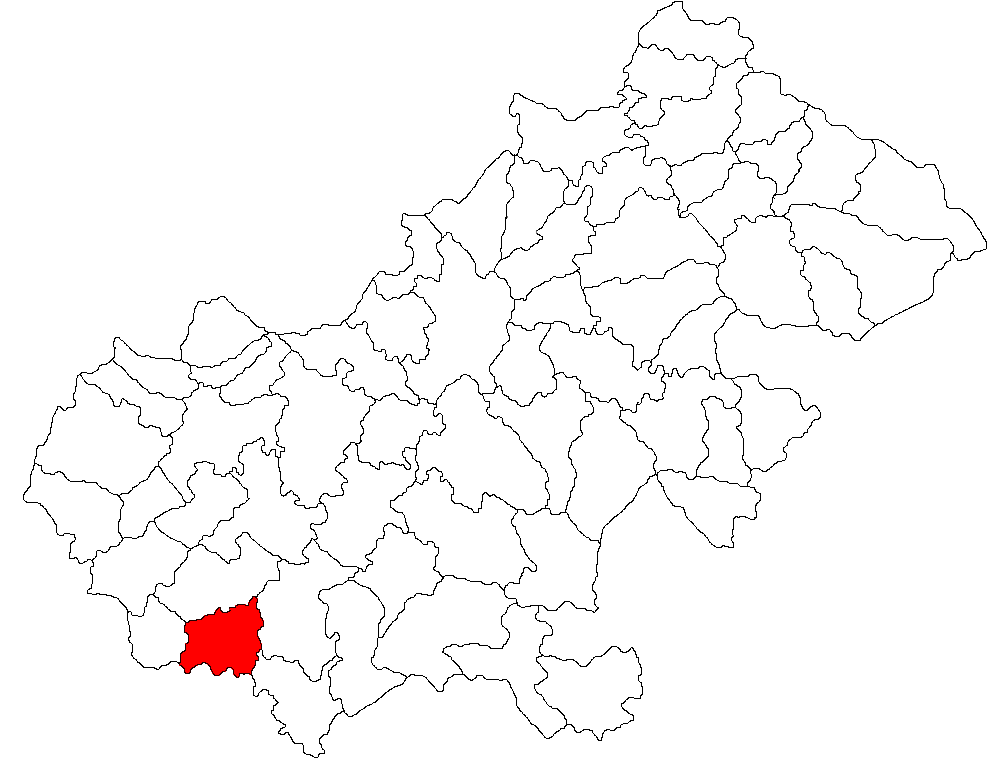
- Location in Satu Mare County

- Location in Romania
- Coordinates: 47°29′N 22°28′E
- Country: Romania
- County: Satu Mare

Government
  - Mayor (2020–2024): Gheorghe Marian (PSD)
- Area: 52.70 km^{2} (20.35 sq mi)
- Elevation: 162 m (531 ft)
- Population (2021-12-01): 1,477
  - Density: 28.03/km^{2} (72.59/sq mi)
- Time zone: UTC+02:00 (EET)
  - Summer (DST): UTC+03:00 (EEST)
- Postal code: 447280
- Area code: +(40) 261
- Vehicle reg.: SM
- Website: comunasauca.ro

Săuca (Hungarian: Sződemeter, Hungarian pronunciation: [ˈsøːdɛmɛtɛr]) is a commune of 1,477 inhabitants situated in Satu Mare County, Crișana, Romania. It is composed of five villages: Becheni (Pele), Cean (Tasnádcsány), Chisău (Keszi), Săuca, and Silvaș (Tasnádszilvás).

== Demographics ==
At the 2002 census, the commune had a population of 1,468, of which 50.74% were Romanians, 35.01% Hungarians, and 14.16% Roma. According to mother tongue, 51.63% of the population spoke Romanian, while 36.64% spoke Hungarian as their first language. At the 2021 census, there were 1,477 inhabitants; of those, 36.36% were Romanians, 34.39% Roma, and 19.5% Hungarians.

== Natives ==
Ferenc Kölcsey, the author of the Hungarian national anthem, was born here in 1790.
