= Himnusz =

National anthem of Hungary

English: 'Anthem'
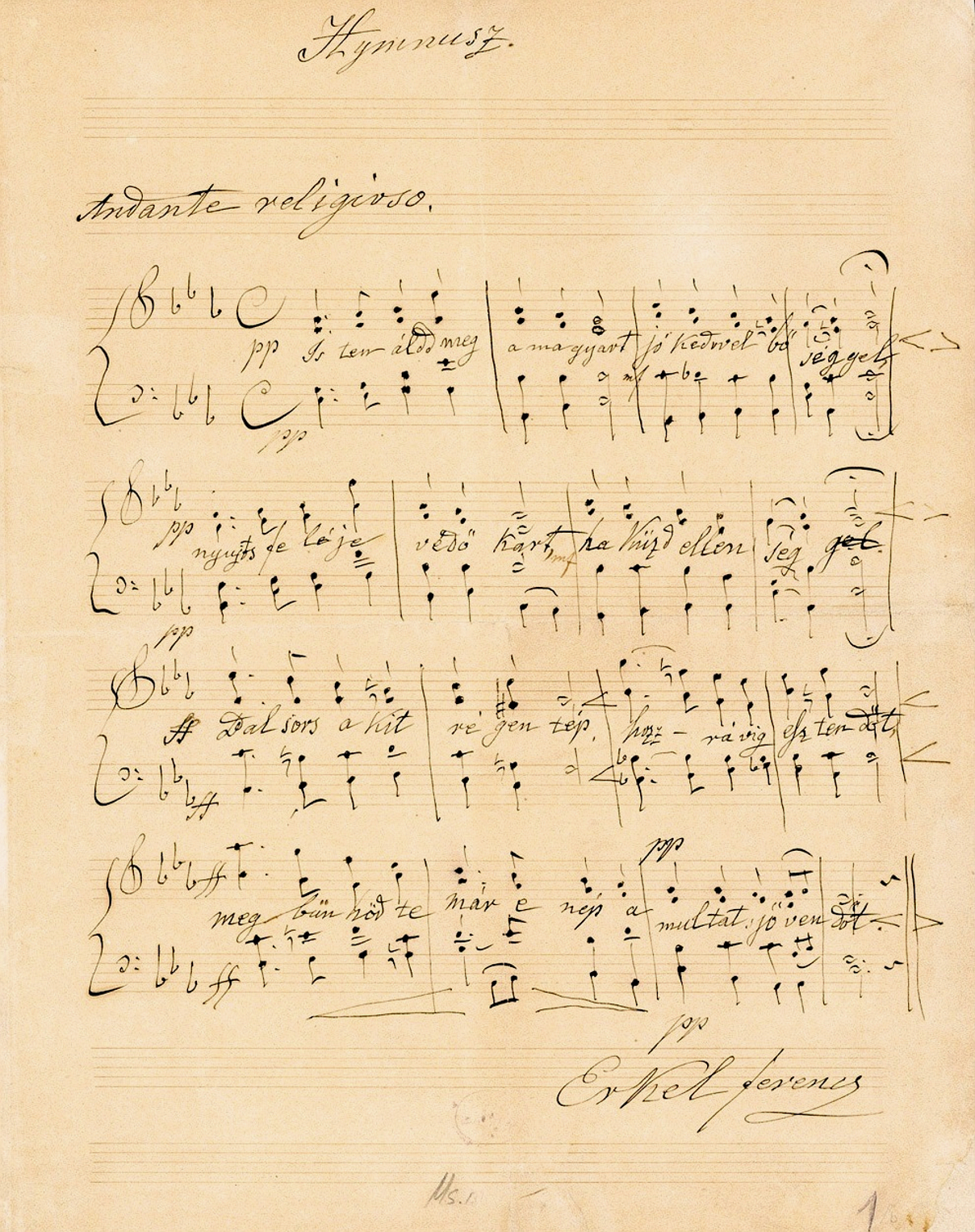
- Original sheet music signed by Ferenc Erkel (c. 1844)
- National anthem of Hungary
- Also known as: "Isten, áldd meg a Magyart" (English: God Bless the Hungarians) "A magyar nép zivataros századaiból" (English: From Stormy Centuries of the Hungarian Folk)
- Lyrics: Ferenc Kölcsey, 1823
- Music: Ferenc Erkel, 1844
- Adopted: 1844 (de facto); 1949 (by the Hungarian People's Republic; instrumental); 1989 (de jure; lyrics)

Audio sample
- U.S. Navy Band instrumental rendition in D-flat major: file; help

"Himnusz" (Note: Hungarian pronunciation: [ˈhimnus]) is the national anthem of Hungary. The lyrics were written by Ferenc Kölcsey, a nationally renowned poet, in 1823, and its currently official musical setting was composed by the romantic composer Ferenc Erkel in 1844, although other lesser known musical versions exist. The poem bore the subtitle "A magyar nép zivataros századaiból" (From Stormy Centuries of the Hungarian Folk); it is often argued that this subtitle – by emphasising past rather than contemporary national troubles – was added expressly to enable the poem to pass Habsburg censorship. The full meaning of the poem's text is evident only to those well acquainted with Hungarian history. The first stanza is sung at official ceremonies and as well in common settings. It was de facto used as hymn of the Kingdom of Hungary from its composition in 1844, and was officially adopted as national anthem of the Third Hungarian Republic in 1989.

The lyrics of the "Himnusz" are a prayer beginning with the words "God bless the Hungarians" ("Isten, áldd meg a magyart"). (Note: Hungarian pronunciation: [ˈiʃtɛn ˈaːld mɛɡ ɒ ˈmɒɟɒrt])

== Name ==
The title in the original manuscript is "Hymnus", a Latin word for 'hymn'. The Hungarian word himnusz is itself derived from the Latin word hymnus, which is in turn borrowed from Ancient Greek ῠ̔́μνος hýmnos, meaning 'song, hymn, ode' (generally in praise of gods or heroes); and in many languages of Europe, the word is used as a loanword to mean both 'hymn' and 'anthem'. The word himnusz replaced the original Latin word hymnus over time, and as the poem gained widespread acceptance as the de facto national anthem of Hungary, so too did the word himnusz took on the meaning of '(national) anthem'.

== History ==
Although Ferenc Kölcsey completed the poem on 22 January 1823, it was only published first in 1829 in Károly Kisfaludy's Aurora, without the subtitle, despite it being part of the manuscript. It subsequently appeared in a collection of Kölcsey's works in 1832, this time with the subtitle. A competition for composers to make the poem suitable to be sung by the public was staged in 1844 and won by Ferenc Erkel's entry. His version was first performed in the National Theatre (where he was conductor) in July 1844, then in front of a larger audience on 10 August 1844, at the inaugural voyage of the steamship Széchenyi. By the end of the 1850s it became customary to sing "Himnusz" at special occasions either alongside Vörösmarty's "Szózat" or on its own.

In the early 1900s, various members of the Hungarian parliament proposed making the status of "Himnusz" as the national anthem of Hungary within Austria-Hungary official, but their efforts never got enough traction for such a law to be passed. Later, in the 1950s, communist dictator Mátyás Rákosi made plans to have the anthem replaced by one more suited to the Communist ideology, but the persons he had in mind for the task, poet Gyula Illyés and composer Zoltán Kodály, both refused. It was not until 1989 that Erkel's musical adaptation of "Himnusz" finally gained official recognition as Hungary's national anthem, by being mentioned as such in the Constitution of Hungary.

== Official uses ==
The public radio station Kossuth Rádió plays "Himnusz" at ten minutes past midnight each day at the close of transmissions in the AM band, as do the state TV channels at the end of the day's broadcasts. "Himnusz" is also traditionally played on Hungarian television at the stroke of midnight on New Year's Eve.

== Alternative anthems ==
"Szózat", another Hungarian patriotic song, enjoys a social status nearly equal to that of "Himnusz", even though only "Himnusz" is mentioned in the Constitution of Hungary. "Szózat" is often considered to be a de facto second national anthem of Hungary. Traditionally, "Himnusz" is sung at the beginning of ceremonies, and Szózat at the end (although "Himnusz", resembling a Protestant chorale, is substantially easier to sing than the difficult rhythm of the Szózat, which is often only played from recording).

Recognition is also given to the "Rákóczi March", a short wordless piece (composer unknown, but sometimes attributed to János Bihari and Franz Liszt) which is often used on state military occasions; and the poem "Nemzeti dal", written by Sándor Petőfi.

Another popular song is the "Székely himnusz", an unofficial ethnic anthem of the Hungarian-speaking Székelys living in eastern Transylvania—the Székely Land (now part of Romania) and in the rest of the world.

== Lyrics ==
The first verse is officially sung at ceremonies. The last two lines of every stanza is rarely repeated twice.

The two English versions are free translations of the Hungarian words. As Hungarian is a genderless language, masculine pronouns in the English translations are in fact addressed to all Hungarians regardless of gender.

Hungarian original
(Ferenc Kölcsey, 1823)

Isten, áldd meg a magyart
Jó kedvvel, bőséggel,
Nyújts feléje védő kart,
Ha küzd ellenséggel;
Bal sors akit régen tép,
Hozz rá víg esztendőt,
Megbűnhődte már e nép
A múltat s jövendőt!

Őseinket felhozád
Kárpát szent bércére,
Általad nyert szép hazát
Bendegúznak vére.
S merre zúgnak habjai
Tiszának, Dunának,
Árpád hős magzatjai
Felvirágozának.

Értünk Kunság mezein
Ért kalászt lengettél,
Tokaj szőlővesszein
Nektárt csepegtettél.
Zászlónk gyakran plántálád
Vad török sáncára,
S nyögte Mátyás bús hadát
Bécsnek büszke vára.

Hajh, de bűneink miatt
Gyúlt harag kebledben,
S elsújtád villámidat
Dörgő fellegedben,
Most rabló mongol nyilát
Zúgattad felettünk,
Majd töröktől rabigát
Vállainkra vettünk.

Hányszor zengett ajkain
Ozmán vad népének
Vert hadunk csonthalmain
Győzedelmi ének!
Hányszor támadt tenfiad
Szép hazám, kebledre,
S lettél magzatod miatt
Magzatod hamvvedre!

Bújt az üldözött, s felé
Kard nyúlt barlangjában,
Szerte nézett s nem lelé
Honját a hazában,
Bércre hág és völgybe száll,
Bú s kétség mellette,
Vérözön lábainál,
S lángtenger fölette.

Vár állott, most kőhalom,
Kedv s öröm röpkedtek,
Halálhörgés, siralom
Zajlik már helyettek.
S ah, szabadság nem virúl
A holtnak véréből,
Kínzó rabság könnye hull
Árvánk hő szeméből!

Szánd meg Isten a magyart
Kit vészek hányának,
Nyújts feléje védő kart
Tengerén kínjának.
Bal sors akit régen tép,
Hozz rá víg esztendőt,
Megbűnhődte már e nép
A múltat s jövendőt!

English translation
(Laszlo Korossy, 2003)

O God, bless the nation of Hungary
With your grace and bounty
Extend over it your guarding arm
During strife with its enemies
Long torn by ill fate
Bring upon it a time of relief
This nation has suffered for all sins
Of the past and of the future!

You brought our ancestors up
Over the Carpathians' holy peaks
By You was won a beautiful homeland
For Bendeguz's sons
And wherever flow the rivers of
The Tisza and the Danube
Árpád our hero's descendants
Will root and bloom.

For us on the plains of the Kuns
You ripened the wheat
In the grape fields of Tokaj
You dripped sweet nectar
Our flag you often planted
On the wild Turk's earthworks
And under Mátyás' grave army whimpered
Vienna's "proud fort."

Ah, but for our sins
Anger gathered in Your bosom
And You struck with Your lightning
From Your thundering clouds
Now the plundering Mongols' arrows
You swarmed over us
Then the Turks' slave yoke
We took upon our shoulders.

How often came from the mouths
Of Osman's barbarian nation
Over the corpses of our defeated army
A victory song!
How often did your own son aggress
My homeland, upon your breast,
And you became because of your own sons
Your own sons' funeral urn!

The fugitive hid, and towards him
The sword reached into his cave
Looking everywhere he could not find
His home in his homeland
Climbs the mountain, descends the valley
Sadness and despair his companions
Sea of blood beneath his feet
Ocean of flame above.

Castle stood, now a heap of stones
Happiness and joy fluttered,
Groans of death, weeping
Now sound in their place.
And Ah! Freedom does not bloom
From the blood of the dead,
Torturous slavery's tears fall
From the burning eyes of the orphans!

Pity, O Lord, the Hungarians
Who are tossed by waves of danger
Extend over it your guarding arm
On the sea of its misery
Long torn by ill fate
Bring upon it a time of relief
They who have suffered for all sins
Of the past and of the future!

Metrical English translation
(William N. Loew, 1881)

O, my God, the Magyar bless
With Thy plenty and good cheer!
With Thine aid his just cause press,
Where his foes to fight appear.
Fate, who for so long did'st frown,
Bring him happy times and ways;
Atoning sorrow hath weighed down
Sins of past and future days.

By Thy help our fathers gained
Kárpát's proud and sacred height;
Here by Thee a home obtained
Heirs of Bendegúz, the knight.
Where'er Danube's waters flow
And the streams of Tisza swell
Árpád's children, Thou dost know,
Flourished and did prosper well.

For us let the golden grain
Grow upon the fields of Kún,
And let nectar's silver rain
Ripen grapes of Tokay soon.
Thou our flags hast planted o'er
Forts where once wild Turks held sway;
Proud Vienna suffered sore
From King Mátyás' dark array.

But, alas! for our misdeed,
Anger rose within Thy breast,
And Thy lightnings Thou did'st speed
From Thy thundering sky with zest.
Now the Mongol arrow flew
Over our devoted heads;
Or the Turkish yoke we knew,
Which a free-born nation dreads.

O, how often has the voice
Sounded of wild Osman's hordes,
When in songs they did rejoice
O'er our heroes' captured swords!
Yea, how often rose Thy sons,
My fair land, upon Thy sod,
And Thou gavest to these sons,
Tombs within the breast they trod!

Though in caves pursued he lie,
Even then he fears attacks.
Coming forth the land to spy,
Even a home he finds he lacks.
Mountain, vale – go where he would,
Grief and sorrow all the same –
Underneath a sea of blood,
While above a sea of flame.

'Neath the fort, a ruin now,
Joy and pleasure erst were found,
Only groans and sighs, I trow,
In its limits now abound.
But no freedom's flowers return
From the spilt blood of the dead,
And the tears of slavery burn,
Which the eyes of orphans shed.

Pity, God, the Magyar, then,
Long by waves of danger tossed;
Help him by Thy strong hand when
He on grief's sea may be lost.
Fate, who for so long did'st frown,
Bring him happy times and ways;
Atoning sorrow hath weighed down
All the sins of all his days.

== Himnusz sculpture ==
Himnusz sculpture
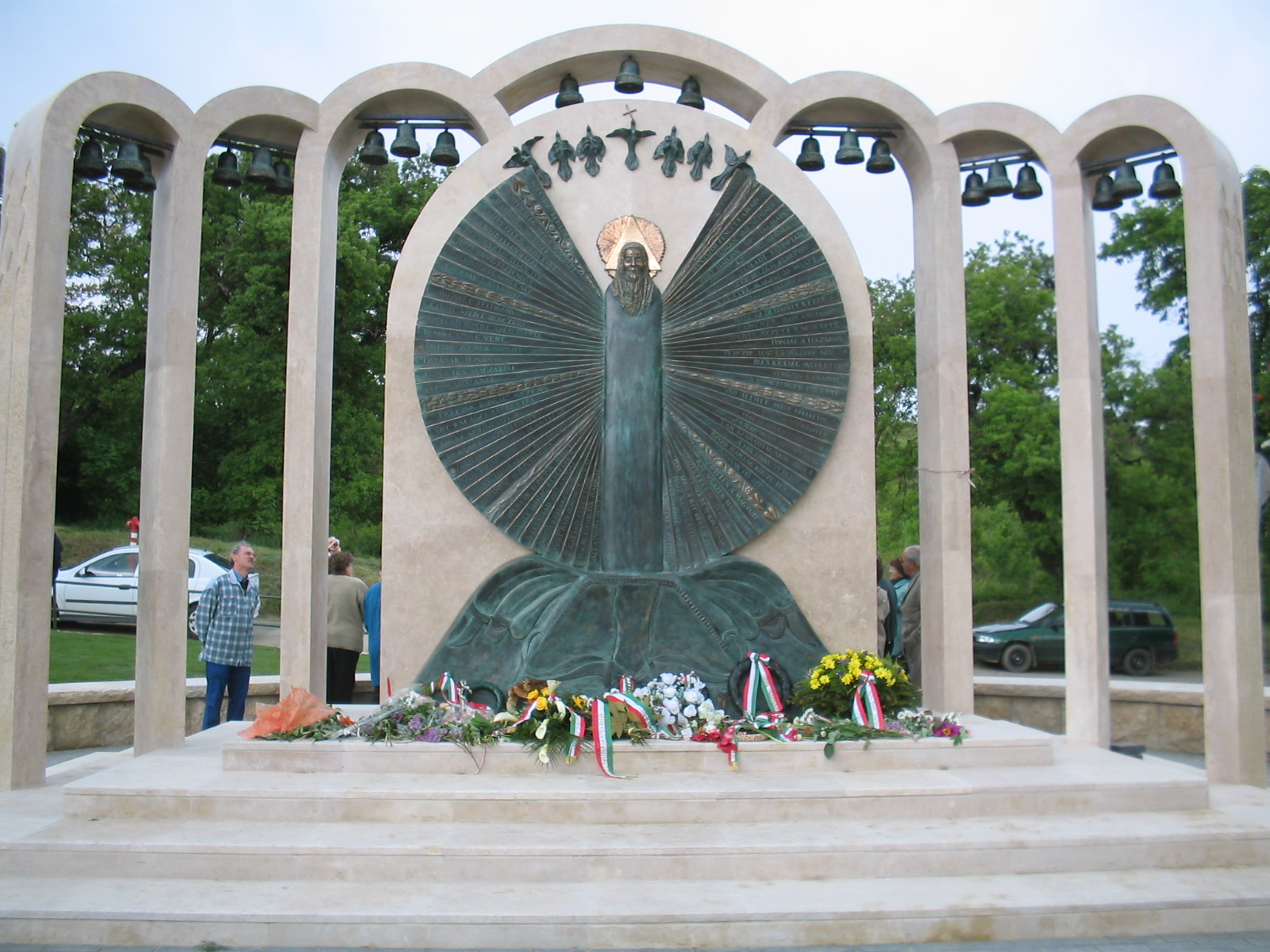
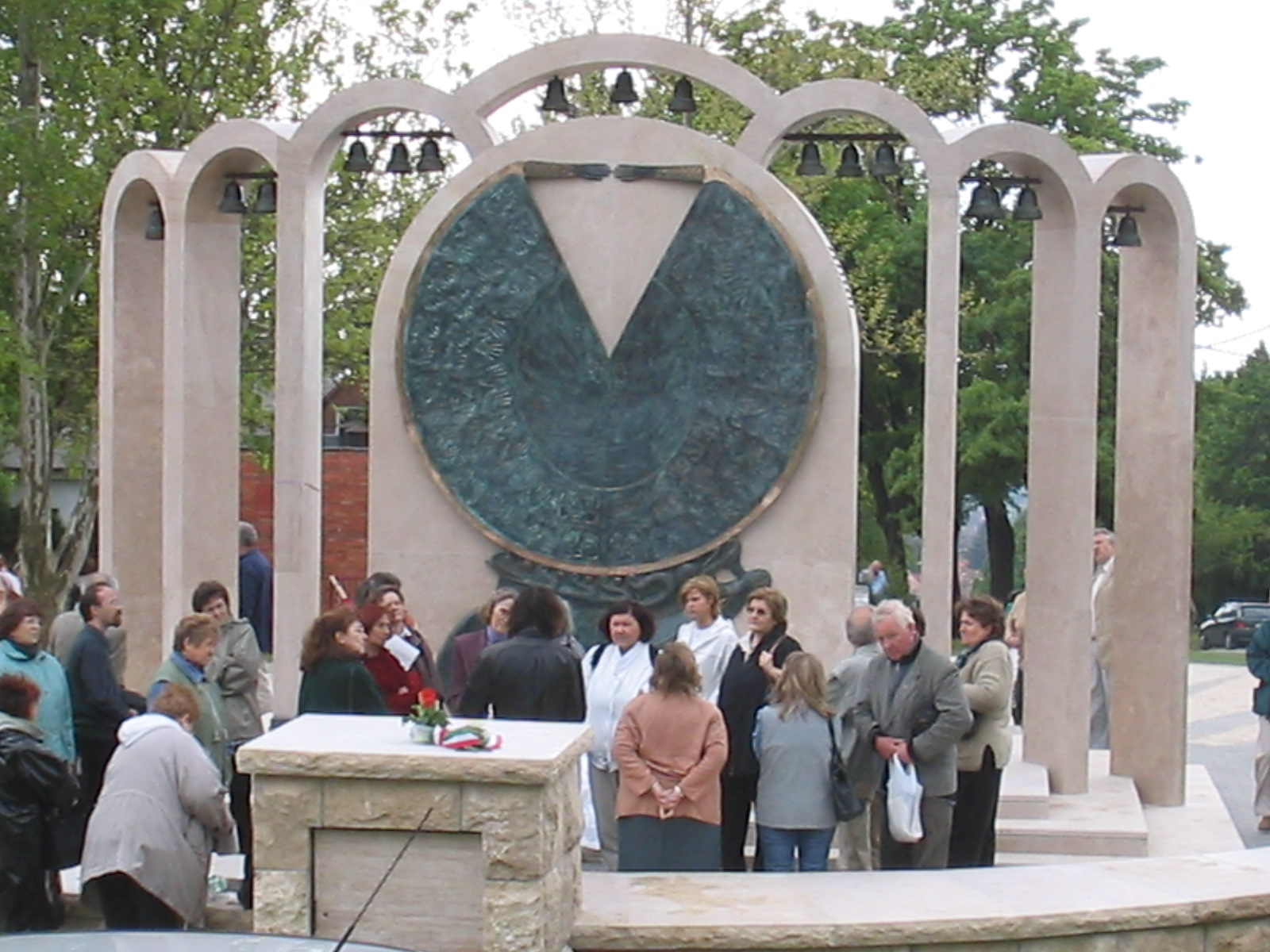

On 7 May 2006, a sculpture was inaugurated for "Himnusz" at Szarvas Square, Budakeszi, a small town close to Budapest. It was created by Mária V. Majzik, an artist with the Hungarian Heritage Award, depicting the full text of the poem in a circle, centered around a two metres high bronze figure of God, with 21 bronze bells in seven arches between eight pieces of stone, each four and a half metres high. The melody of the poem can be played on the bells. The cost of its construction, 40 million forints (roughly 200,000 USD), was collected through public subscription.
