= Ilona Vörösmarty =

Hungarian noblewoman

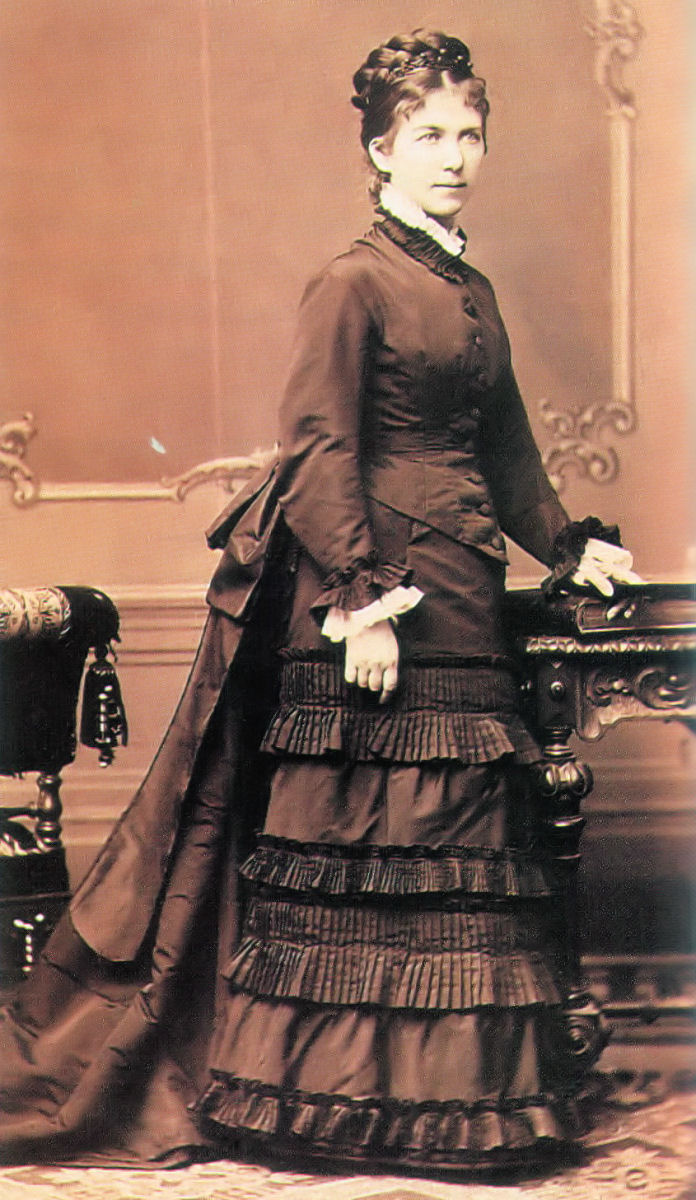
- Photo taken by Ede Ellinger in 1875
- Born: 2 May 1846; Pest, Hungary, Austrian Empire
- Died: 13 December 1910 (aged 64); Budapest, Austria-Hungary
- Spouse: Kálmán Széll
- Issue: Ilona Széll
- Father: Mihály Vörösmarty
- Mother: Laura Csajághy

Ilona Vörösmarty (2 May 1846 – 13 December 1910) was a Hungarian noblewoman, the second child and the daughter of poet Mihály Vörösmarty and his wife, Laura Csajághy.

== Family ==
Her brother was Béla Vörösmarty. After her father's death in 1855, she was raised by Ferenc Deák. She married Kálmán Széll on 16 September 1867. Széll later became Prime Minister of Hungary. They had a daughter, named Ilona.

== Sources ==
- Magyar családtörténeti adattár
