= Flare Path =

1942 play written by Terence Rattigan

- Written by: Terence Rattigan
- Characters: Patricia Graham; Teddy Graham; Peter Kyle; Doris; Count Skriczevinsky; Dusty Miller; Maudie Miller; Sqn Ldr Swanson; Mrs. Oakes; Percy; Wiggy Jones
- Genre: Drama
- Setting: Hotel near an RAF airbase during World War II

Premiere
- Date: 13 August 1942
- Place: Apollo Theatre, London

Flare Path is a play by Terence Rattigan, written in 1941 and first staged in 1942. Set in a hotel near an RAF Bomber Command airbase during the Second World War, the story involves a love triangle between a pilot, his actress wife and a famous film star. The play is based in part on Rattigan's own wartime experiences, and was significantly reworked and adapted for film as The Way to the Stars.

== Synopsis ==
At the Falcon Hotel on the Lincolnshire coast, men from a nearby RAF airbase are planning to spend the weekend with their wives. Patricia Graham, an actress from London, has something to tell her husband Teddy, who is a bomber pilot. The situation is complicated when Peter Kyle, a Hollywood film star, arrives at the hotel, and Teddy is sent out on a night raid over Germany. Patricia is torn between a rekindled old flame and loyalty to the husband who relies on her for support.

Patricia and Peter had a love affair before she met Teddy, but she left because Peter was not free to marry her. Patricia married Teddy after a "whirlwind wartime romance" while he was on a week's leave. She does not know her husband very well, and she was still in love with Peter when they wed. She reconnected with Peter in London and now plans to tell Teddy she is leaving him, but she is annoyed by Peter's unexpected arrival at the hotel. Peter tells her that his career is waning as he gets older and that he needs her.

Teddy's tail gunner Dusty Miller is awaiting his wife Maudie, who is late. Maudie only has a short time off from the laundry where she has had to work since the war began. She was bombed out of their home in the Blitz, but she says matter-of-factly: "... there's a war on, and things have got to be a bit different, and we've just got to get used to it – that's all."

Doris waits for her husband Count Skriczevinsky, a Polish pilot serving with the RAF. His wife and son were killed by the Nazis, and he came to Britain, despite his poor command of the English language, to join the war against Germany. Doris met him while working as a barmaid, and though she is now his Countess, she worries about what will happen when the war is over and he is able to return to Poland.

Also present at the hotel are the proprietor, Mrs. Oakes; Percy, a young waiter who is interested in RAF operations; and an airman named Corporal Wiggy Jones.

Soon after everyone has arrived, Squadron Leader Swanson summons the men back to base for an unscheduled night operation, and their wives are left behind to await their return. Swanson, who is affectionately called Gloria by Teddy, remains at the hotel. As Patricia and Swanson look out at the flare path from the hotel window, one of the planes is destroyed on takeoff by the Luftwaffe. Doris and Maudie come downstairs while Swanson calls the airfield and learns that the plane did not belong to any of their husbands.

At 5:30 a.m., Teddy and Dusty return from the mission, but Count Skriczevinsky is missing in action. Teddy confesses to Patricia that he is losing his nerve. His plane was hit and he was responsible for bringing his six crewmen back home. He knew his crew trusted him but he was terrified, and he tells Patricia she was the only thing that kept him going. Patricia has a change of heart and decides to stay with Teddy. She tells Peter, "I used to think that our private happiness was something far too important to be affected by outside things, like war or marriage vows ..." but that "beside what's happening out there; ... it's just tiny and rather – cheap – I'm afraid."

Doris asks Peter to translate a letter written in French that the Count left for her in case anything happened to him. In the letter, the Count says he loves her and wishes he could have taken her to Poland after the war. Doris asks if Peter made that part up, but Peter tells her he did not. Peter intends to tell Teddy everything but changes his mind and departs. Count Skriczevinsky returns safely and is reunited with Doris.

== Background ==
The title of the play refers to the lamps outlining runways, necessary for aircraft to take off or land after dark and which were known as a flare path. As Doris observes in the play, flare paths also attracted German night fighters to target the RAF planes.

In writing the play, Rattigan drew on his experiences as a tail gunner in RAF Coastal Command. He was suffering from writer's block, but on a mission to West Africa in 1941 he started writing Flare Path. He managed to save the incomplete manuscript when his plane was damaged in combat and the crew ordered to jettison excess weight.

== Productions ==
=== Original 1942 London production ===
Flare Path was initially rejected twice because it was thought that the public would not want to see a play about the war. It was accepted by producer Binkie Beaumont of H. M. Tennent, Ltd. The play opened at the Apollo Theatre in London on 13 August 1942. The role of Teddy Graham was played by Jack Watling and his wife Patricia was played by Phyllis Calvert. The director was Anthony Asquith, who later directed the film adaptation The Way to the Stars.

The London production was a critical and popular success and ran for eighteen months and 679 performances. Rattigan was given leave to attend the opening night, and he recalled "spending most of that evening standing rigidly to attention, while Air Marshal after Air Marshal approached the humble Flying Officer to tell him how his play should really have been written." Among the dignitaries who attended performances of Flare Path were Air Marshal Sir Philip Joubert and Prime Minister Winston Churchill. Churchill said the play was "a masterpiece of understatement ... but then we are rather good at understatement, aren’t we?"

London 1942 cast:

- Adrianne Allen as Doris, Countess Skriczevinsky
- Martin Walker as Peter Kyle
- Dora Gregory as Mrs. Oakes
- Leslie Dwyer as Sergeant Dusty Miller
- George Cole as Percy
- Gerard Hinze as Count Skriczevinsky
- Jack Watling as Flight Lieutenant Teddy Graham
- Phyllis Calvert as Patricia Graham
- Kathleen Harrison as Mrs. Maudie Miller
- Ivan Samson as Squadron Leader Swanson
- John Bradley as Corporal Wiggy Jones

=== 1942–43 Broadway production ===
Flare Path had a very short run on Broadway at Henry Miller's Theatre from 23 December 1942 to 2 January 1943. Alec Guinness played Teddy and Nancy Kelly played Patricia. The play was Guinness's Broadway debut, and he was granted leave from the Royal Navy in order to take the role. The director was Margaret Webster. Lighting effects were used to simulate the flare path in a scene where the planes take off from the airfield beyond the hotel.

Flare Path was not as successful in America as it was in Britain. Marion Radcliff of Billboard wrote that although she found Rattigan's depiction of the RAF in wartime to be authentic, "it is unfortunate that he had to pivot the main action of his play about a very uninspired triangle situation – a triangle whose individual angles seem at times very obtuse."

Broadway 1942–43 Cast:

- Dorothy Patten as Doris, Countess Skriczevinsky
- Arthur Margetson as Peter Kyle
- Cynthia Latham as Mrs. Oakes
- Gerald Savory as Sergeant Dusty Miller
- Jackie Kelk as Percy
- Alexander Ivo as Count Skriczevinsky
- Alec Guinness as Flight Lieutenant Teddy Graham
- Nancy Kelly as Patricia Graham
- Helena Pickard as Mrs. Maudie Miller
- Reynolds Denniston as Squadron Leader Swanson

=== 2011 London revival ===
In 2011, Trevor Nunn directed a West End revival of Flare Path at the Theatre Royal, Haymarket, as part of the playwright Terence Rattigan's centenary year celebrations. It marked Nunn's debut as artistic director of the theatre. The play opened on 4 March 2011. It recouped after six weeks and was extended an extra week due to popular demand, closing 11 June 2011.

Sienna Miller starred as Patricia, Harry Hadden-Paton played her husband Teddy, James Purefoy played Teddy's rival Peter, and Sheridan Smith co-starred as Doris. The hotel set was designed by Stephen Brimson Lewis. The airfield beyond the hotel where the planes take off was depicted with projections designed by Jack James, supplemented by sound effects by Paul Groothuis and lighting by Paul Pyant.

The revival of Flare Path was well received by a number of critics. Paul Taylor of The Independent called it a "richly entertaining and beautifully judged revival of this theatrical rarity." According to Charles Spencer of The Daily Telegraph, "Terence Rattigan's Flare Path (1942), rarely ranked in the top drawer of his plays, emerges in Trevor Nunn's superb production as a three-handkerchief weepie that somehow manages to be both profoundly moving and wonderfully funny." Ray Bennett of The Hollywood Reporter wrote, "...Trevor Nunn uses Rattigan's insightful characterizations to create a multilayered view of war and what it does to people." Michael Billington of The Guardian said it was "... a tribute to the collective spirit of wartime bomber crews and their partners. Given the circumstances, you'd hardly expect a debate about the morality of the air offensive: what the play provides, with Rattigan's characteristic flair for understatement, is a deeply moving portrait of people at war."

Henry Hitchings of the London Evening Standard noted that the play might seem dated, but said "... there's no mistaking Rattigan's talent for depicting repressed emotion and tragicomic acts of concealment. Crucially, as in most of his writing, there is a gulf between what the characters say and the true feelings they are either unable or unwilling to express." Billington wrote, "... it is precisely that embarrassed English emotional hesitancy that makes this play so overwhelmingly moving." Sam Marlowe of The Arts Desk called it "... a shattering ensemble work, in which every detail glows with truth, compassion and humanity, and where every seemingly ordinary second of life in an existence hemmed in by the ever-present threat of death is charged with a quiet intensity."

Paul Callan of the Daily Express offered a dissenting view, finding fault with the slow pace and describing the characters as stereotypes that "sadly combine to show the age-lines on this play, even if it is a well-crafted example of Rattigan's skilled writing."

London 2011 Cast:

- Sheridan Smith as Doris, Countess Skriczevinsky
- James Purefoy as Peter Kyle
- Sarah Crowden as Mrs. Oakes
- Joe Armstrong as Sergeant Dusty Miller
- Matthew Tennyson as Percy
- Mark Dexter as Count Skriczevinsky
- Harry Hadden-Paton as Flight Lieutenant Teddy Graham
- Sienna Miller as Patricia Graham
- Emma Handy as Mrs. Maudie Miller
- Clive Wood as Squadron Leader Swanson
- Jim Creighton as Corporal Wiggy Jones
