= Anton Einsle =

Austrian portrait painter (1801–1871)

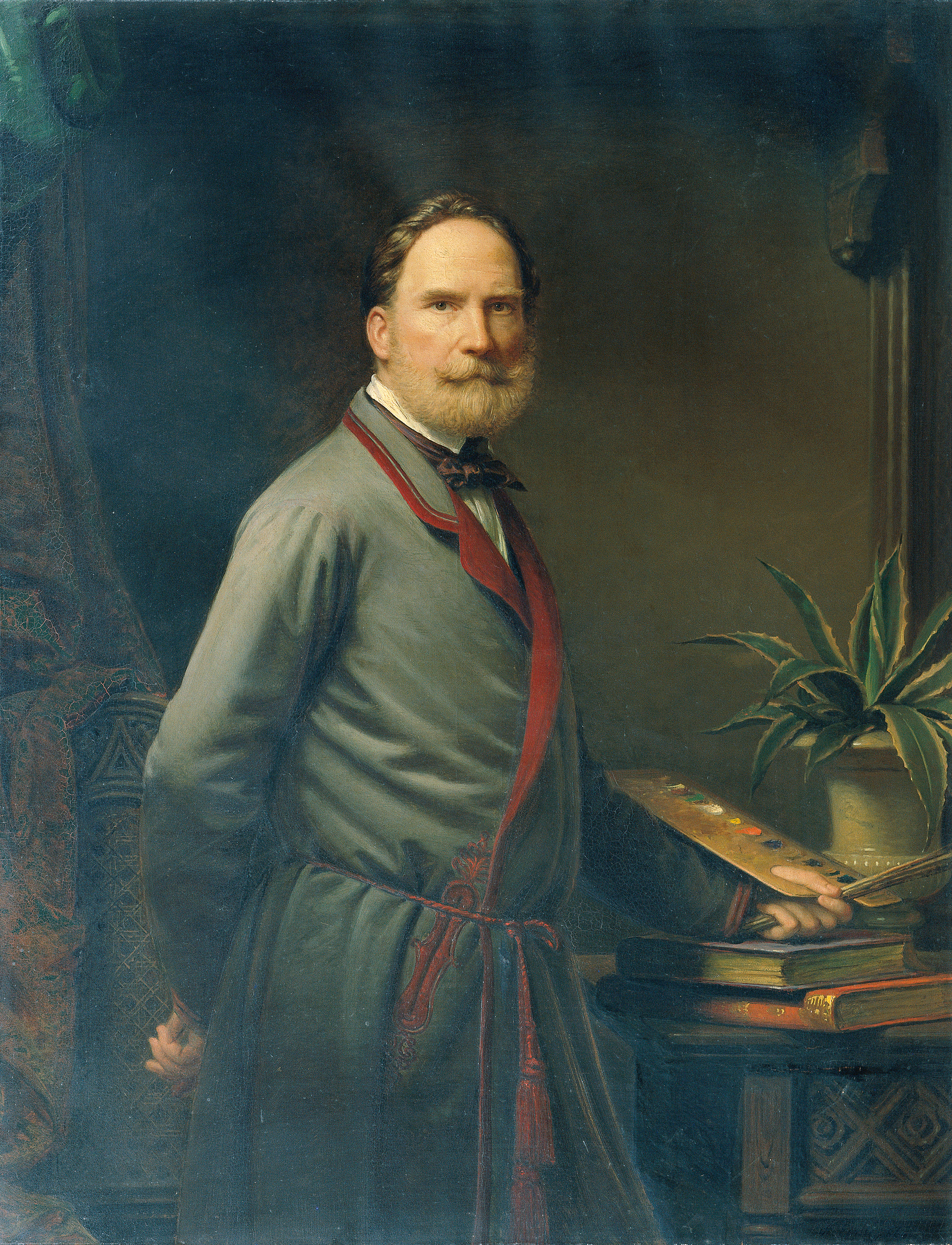
Anton Einsle, Selfportrait, Kunsthistorisches Museum

Anton Einsle (1801–1871), an Austrian portrait painter, was born at Vienna 30 January 1801. He studied at the Academy of that city, and was largely patronized by the court and nobility. He died at Vienna 10 March 1871.

Works by Einsle

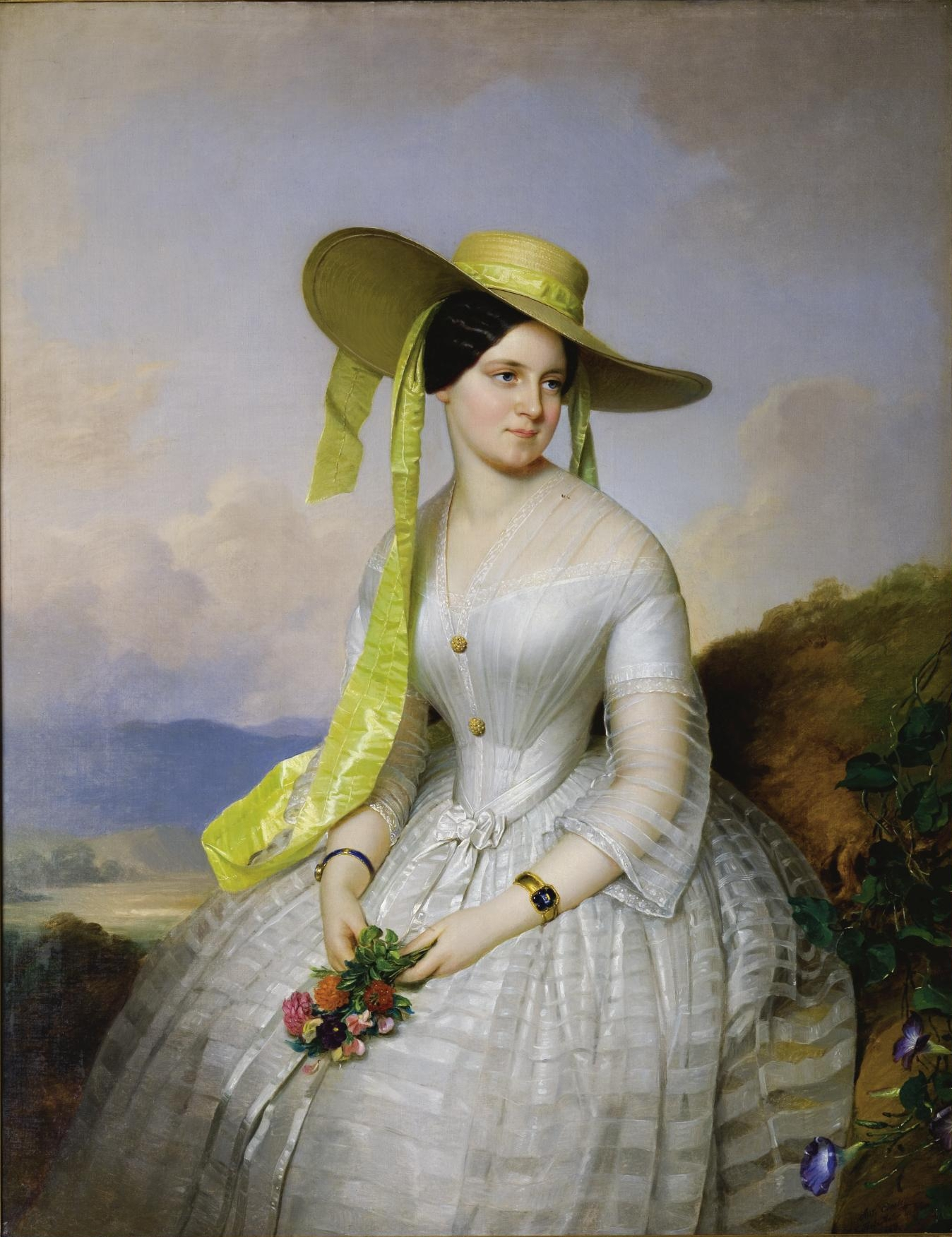
Portrait of a lady with hat

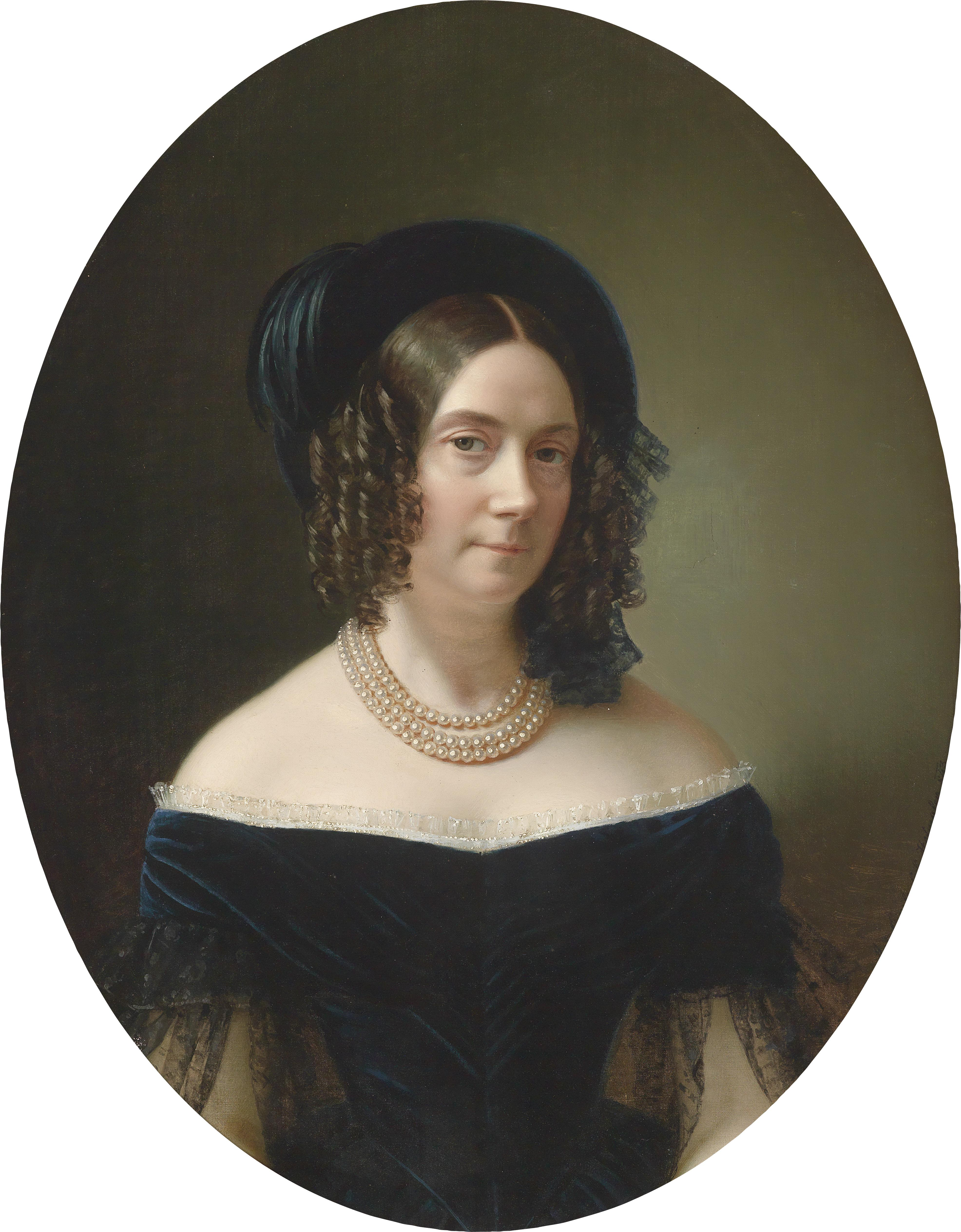
Duchess Maria Dorothea of Württemberg, 1843

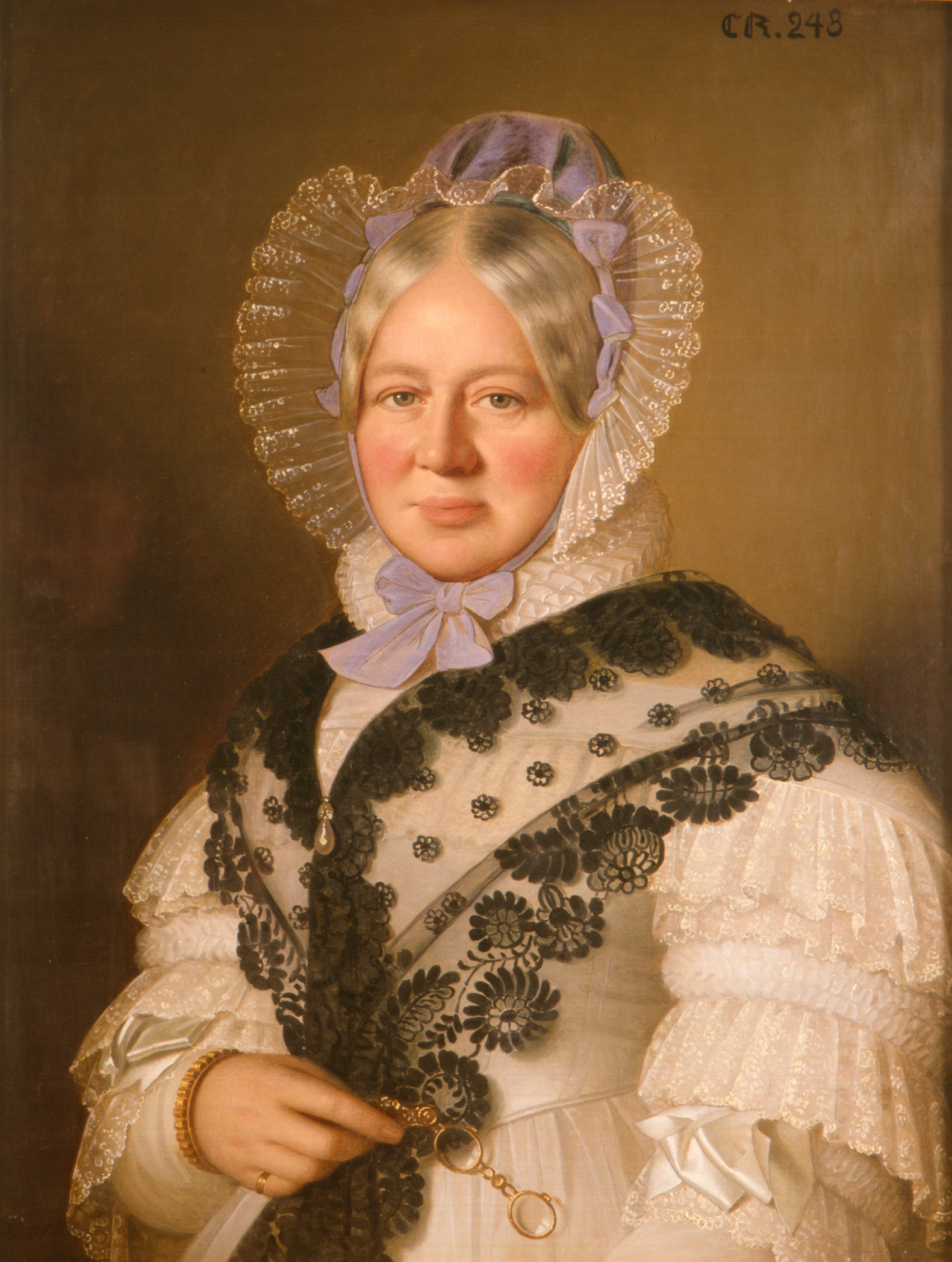
Princess Henriette of Nassau-Weilburg, 1838

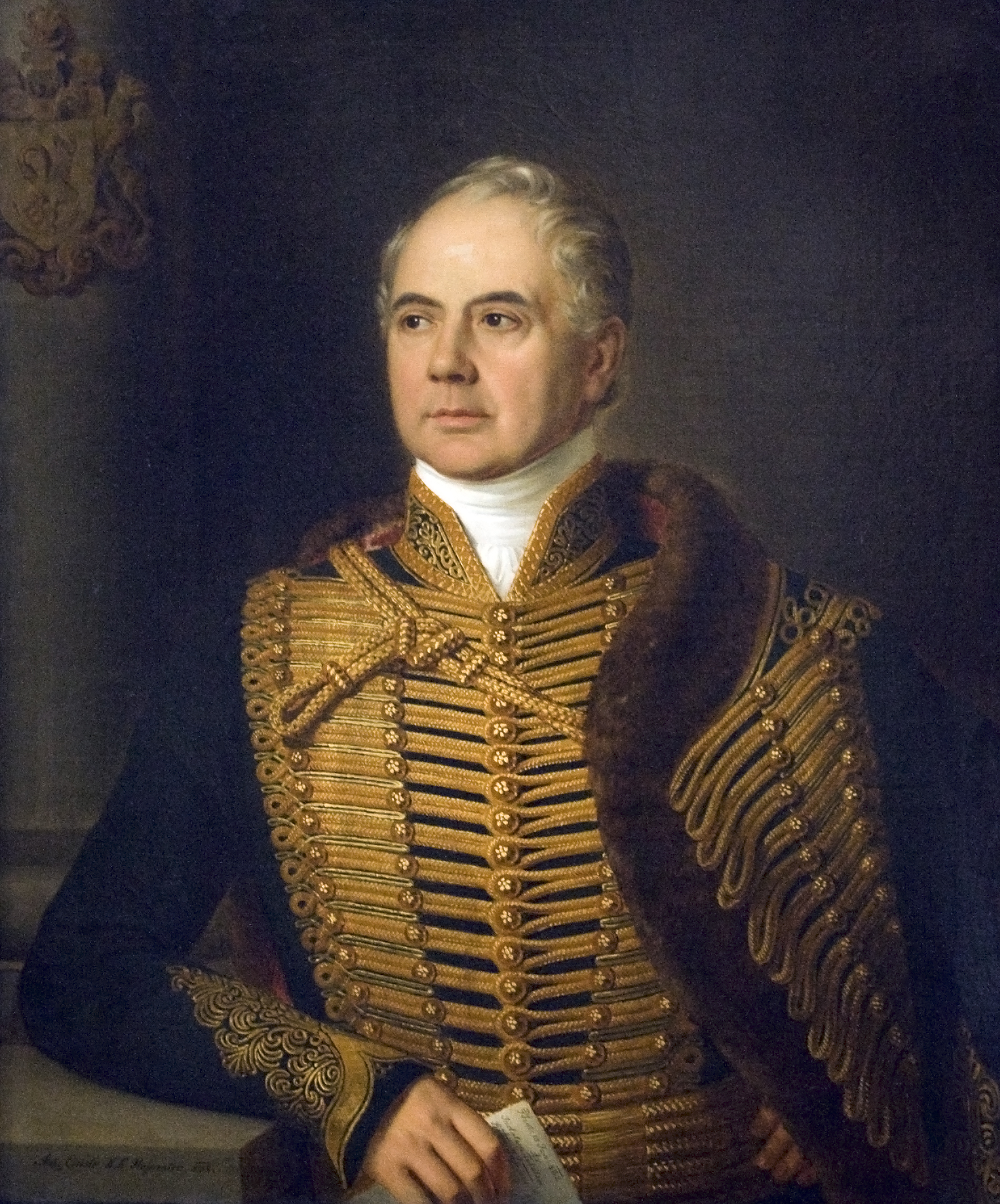
Sándor Mérey, Chief Justice, 1831–1833, now at the Kiscelli Museum

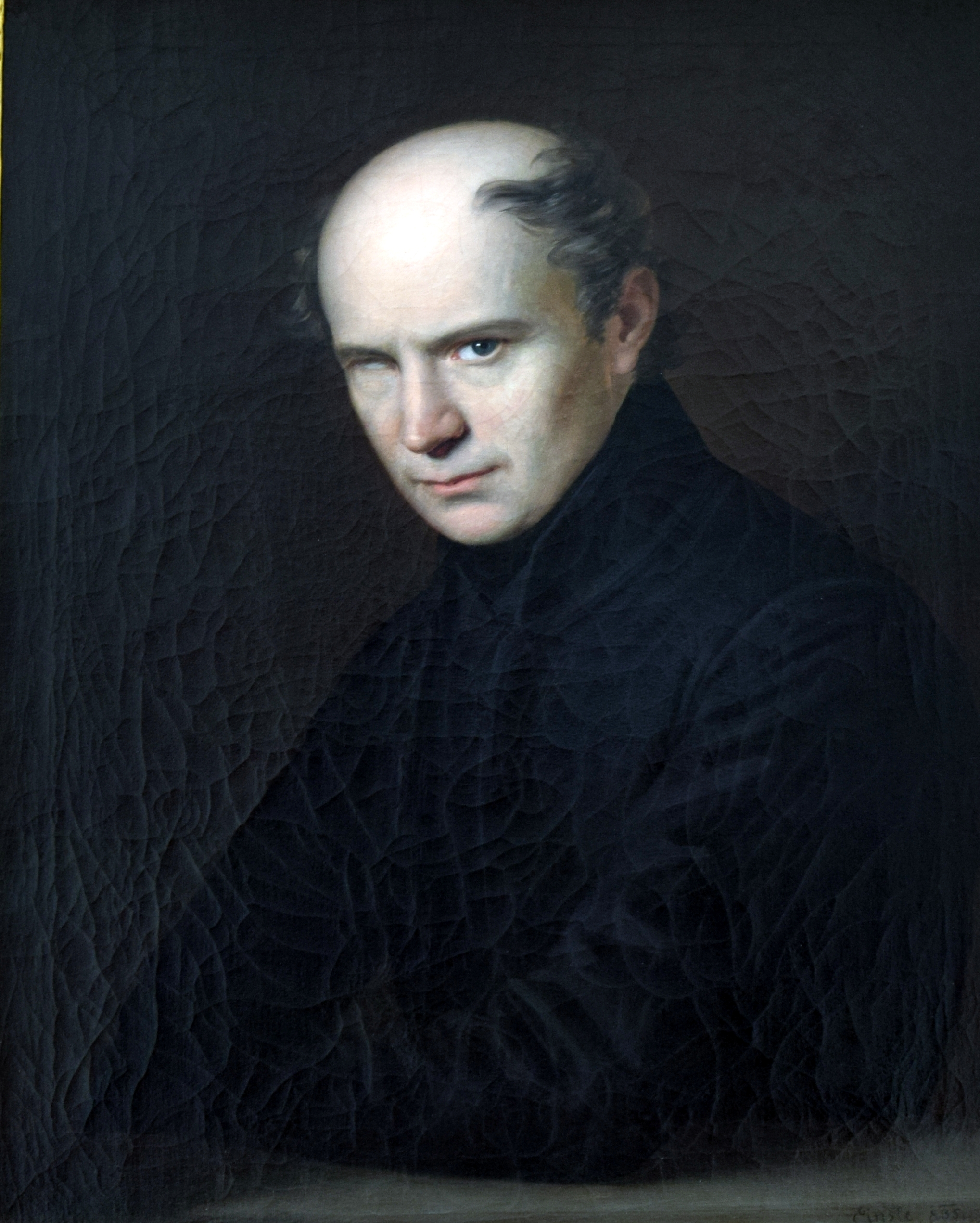
Portrait of Ferenc Kölcsey, 1835

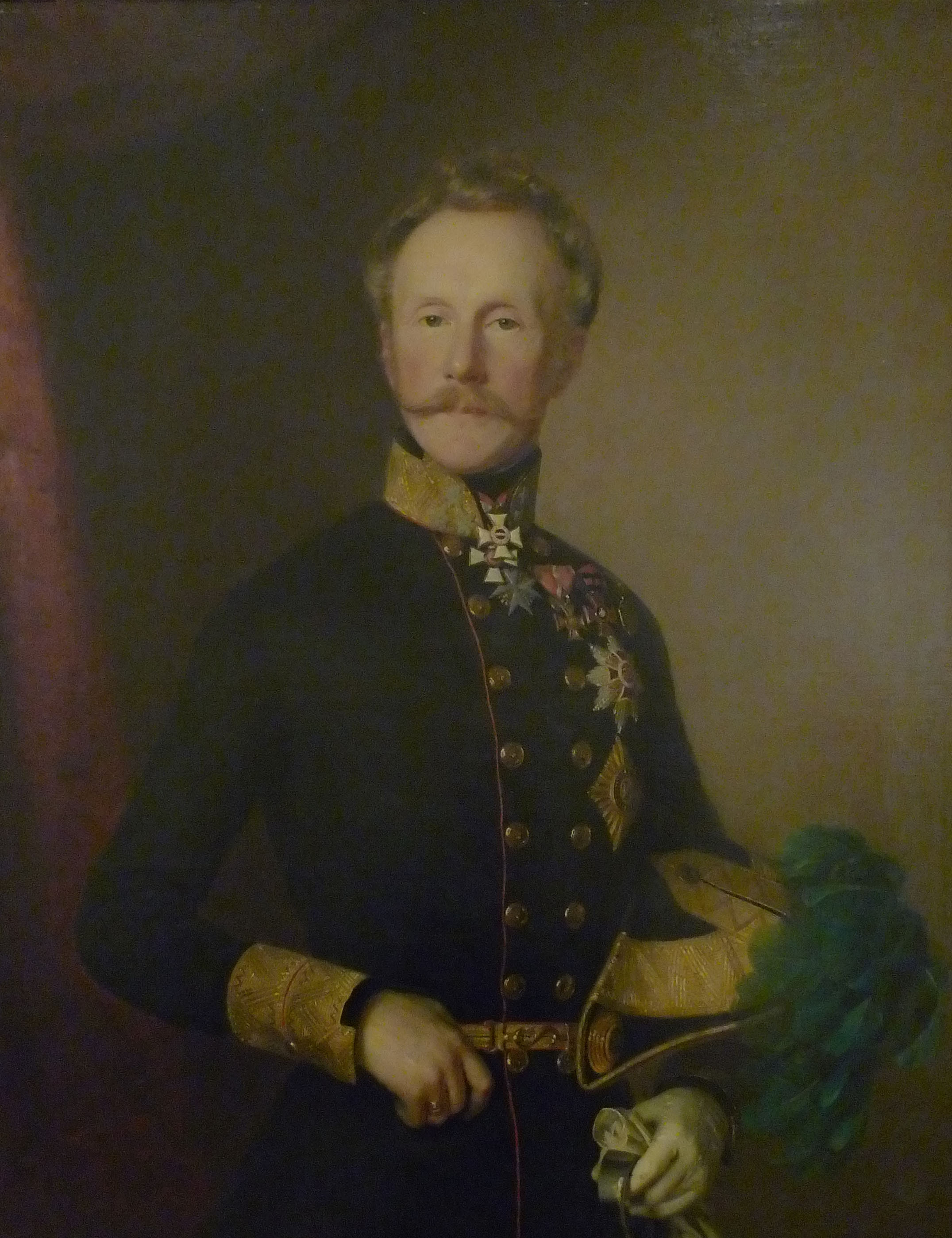
Heinrich von Heß, general, 1849, now at the Heeresgeschichtliches Museum

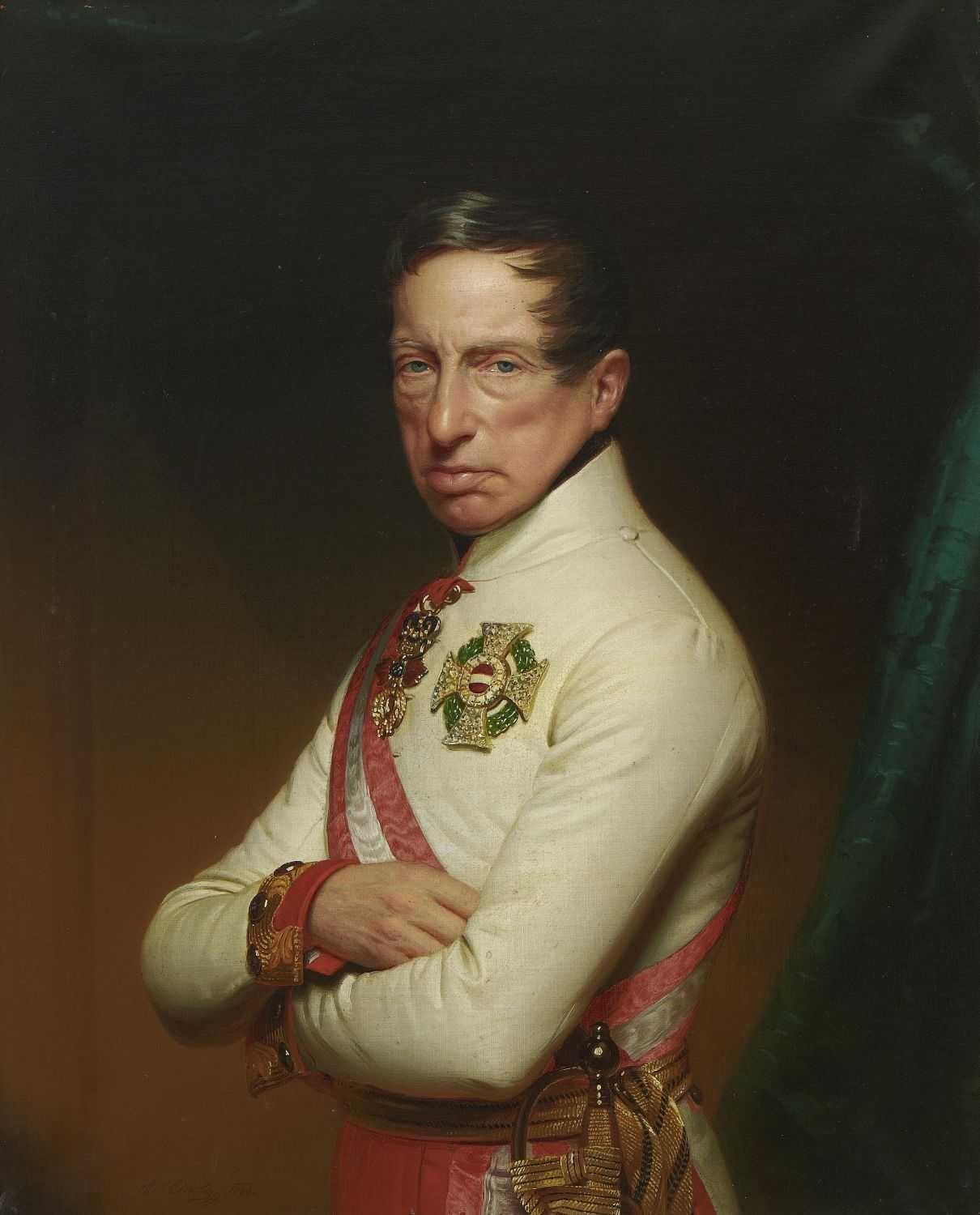
Portrait of Archduke Charles, Duke of Teschen

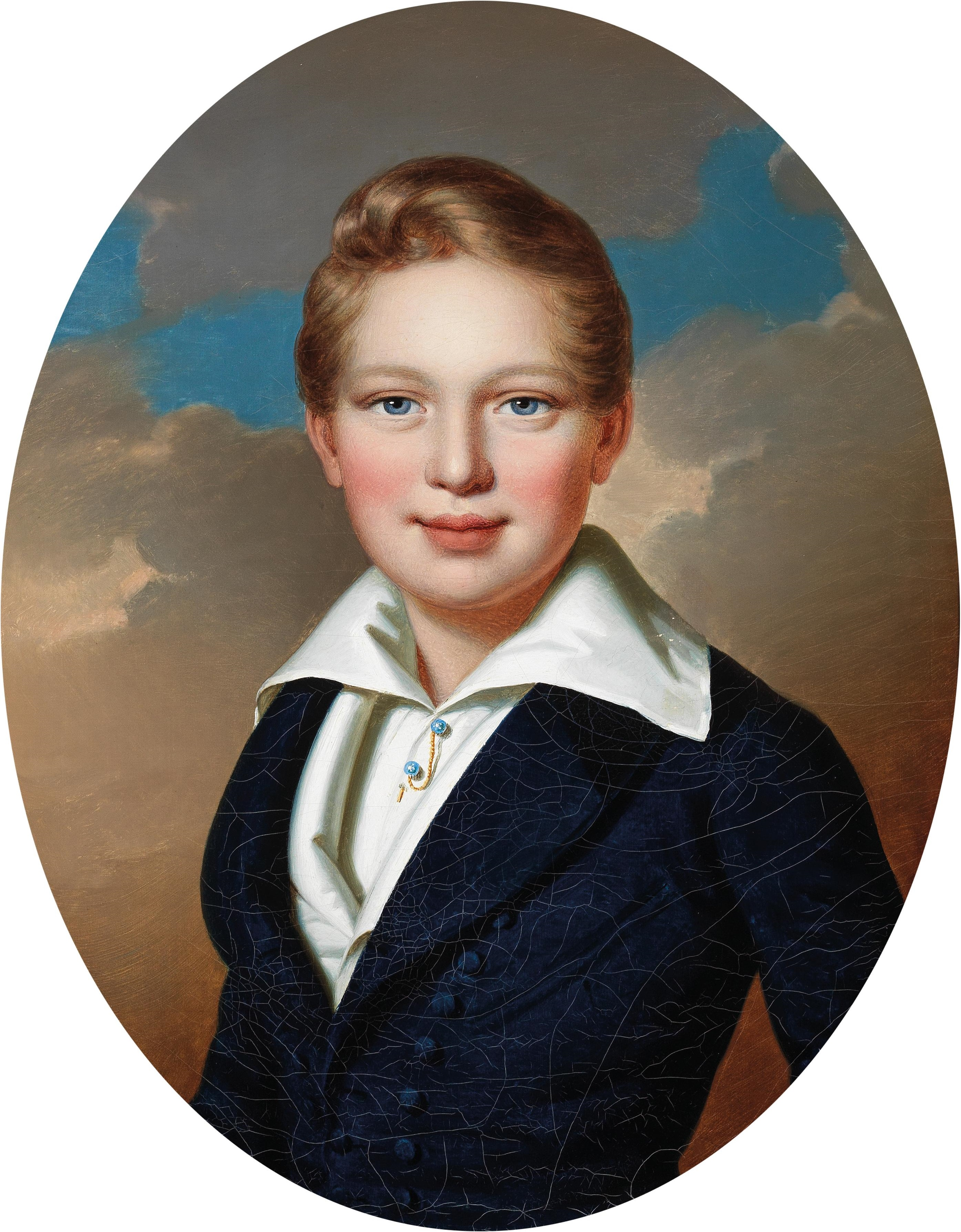
Portrait of Archduke Alexander of Austria (1825–1837) son of Archduke Joseph, Palatine of Hungary. Portrait from 1837

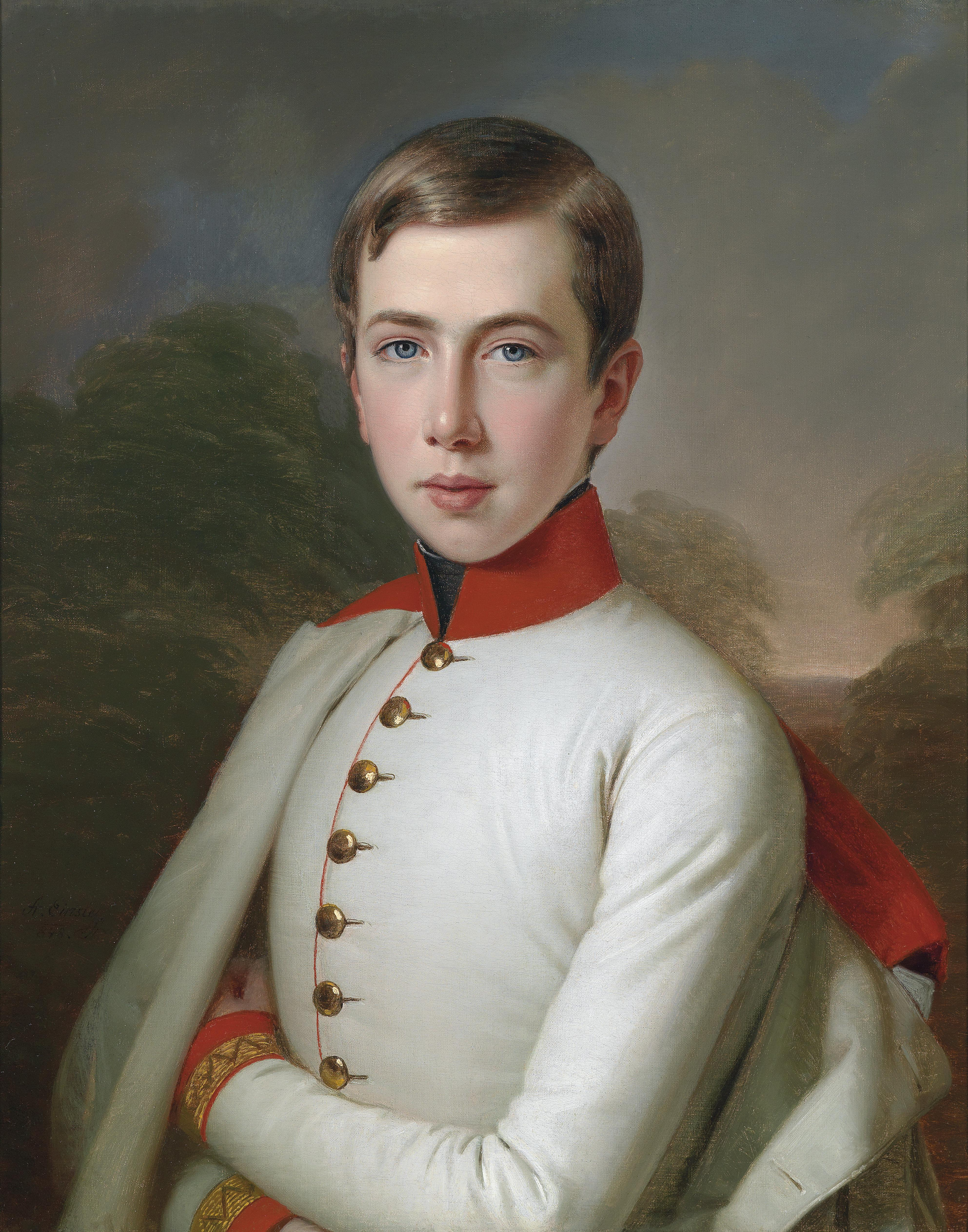
Karl Ludwig of Austria, 1848

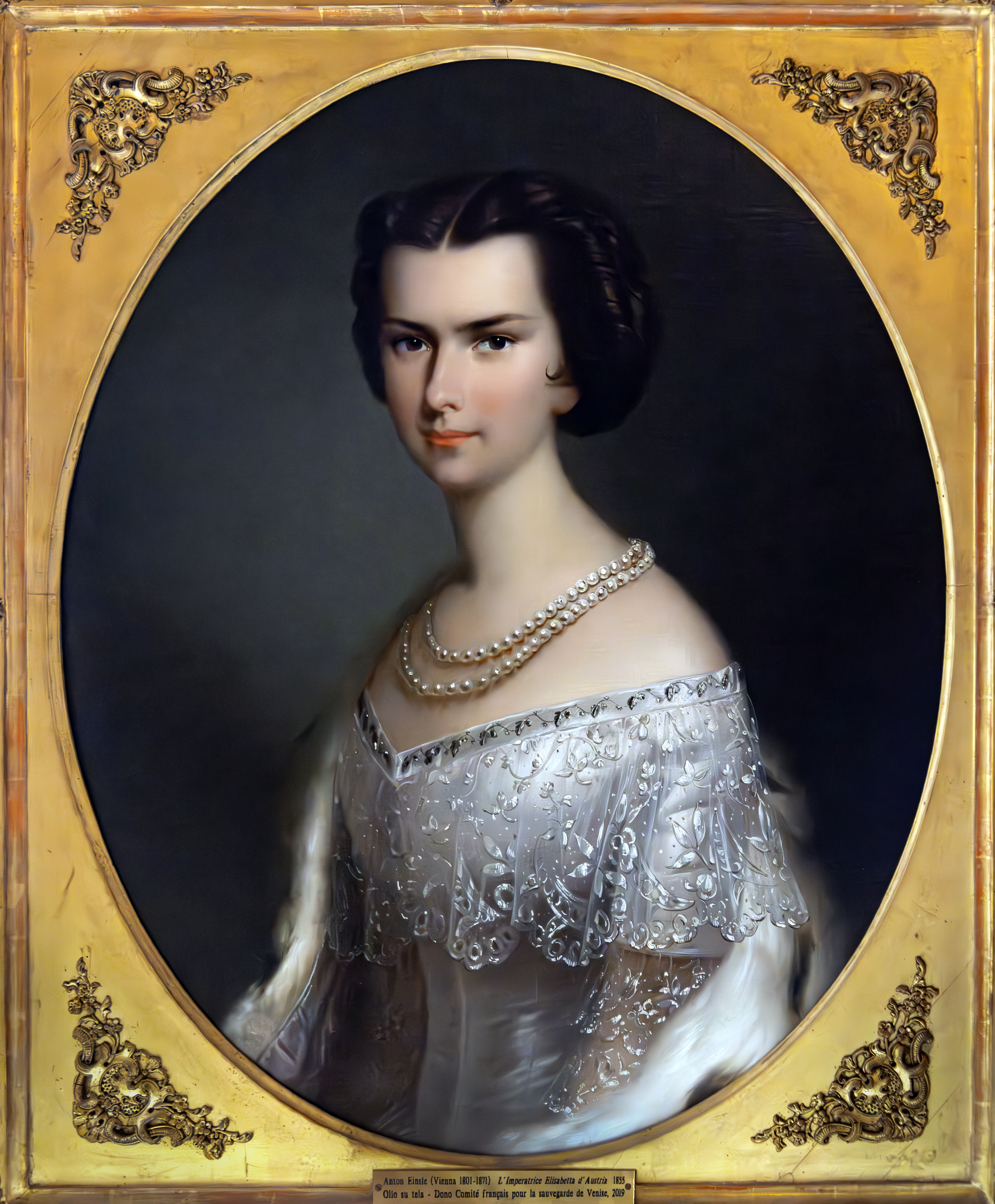
Portrait of Elisabeth of Austria – Museo Correr, 1855.
