= Bódog Czorda =

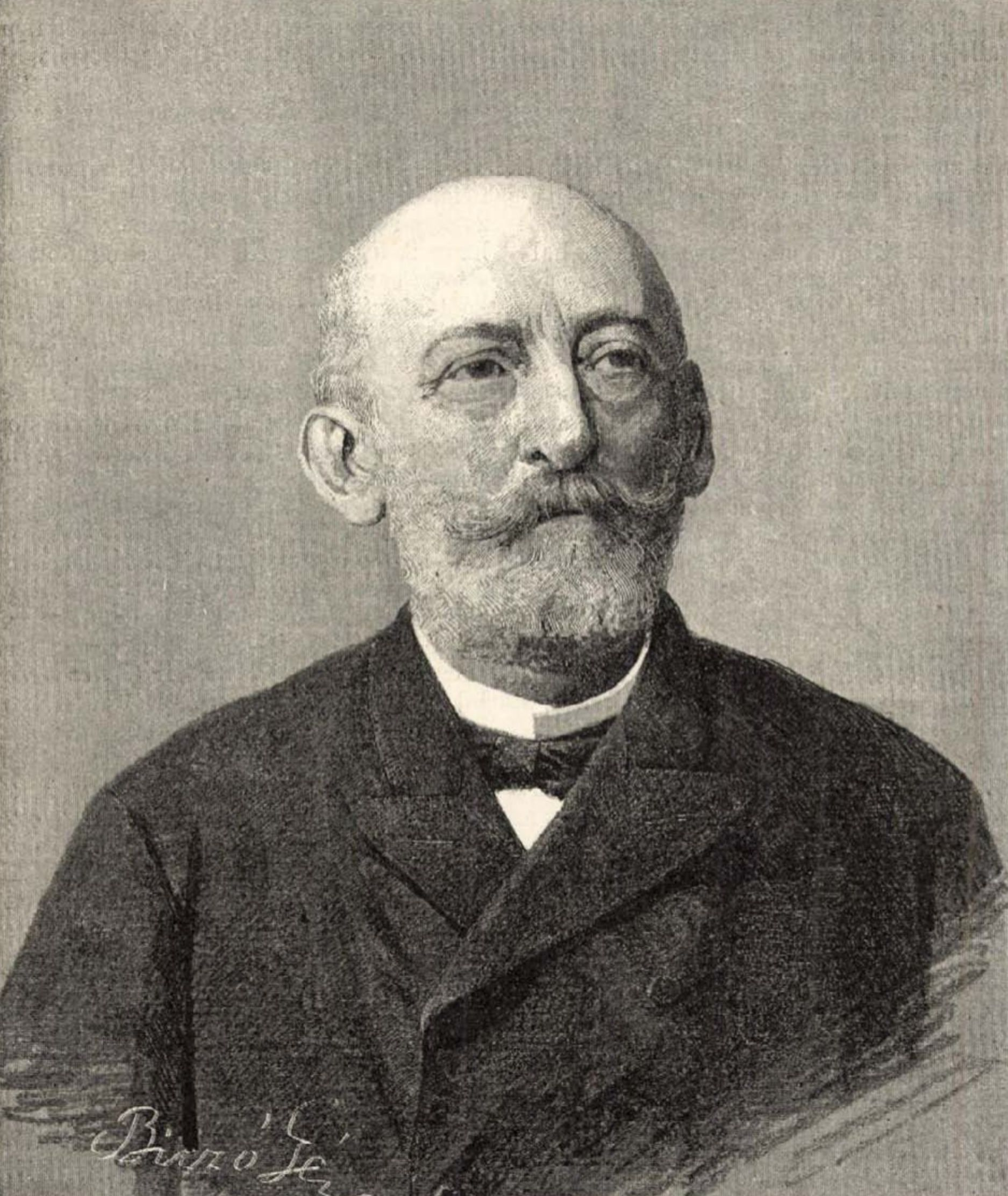

Bódog Czorda (18 December 1828 – 4 July 1904) was a Hungarian lawyer and politician.

He worked as a lawyer until the Hungarian Revolution of 1848 when joined to the Honvédség. After the defeat of the War of Independence he was involuntarily conscripted to the Imperial Army in Italy. After that he was a lawyer in his birthplace, Szabadka (today: Subotica, Serbia). He was arrested because of his political activities in 1860. He was released only after the October Diploma.

Czorda served as Member of Parliament in 1861. After that he worked as lawyer again. He was appointed a judge of the Royal Court of Pest in 1869, later he was one of the judges of the Curia Regia. He served as Secretary of State for Justice since 1889. He was elected President of the Royal Court of Budapest in 1892. He served as Vice President of the Curia Regia between 1893 and 1901.

== Sources ==
- Hungarian Biographical Lexicon (in Hungarian)
