= Csongor és Tünde =

Play written by Mihály Vörösmart

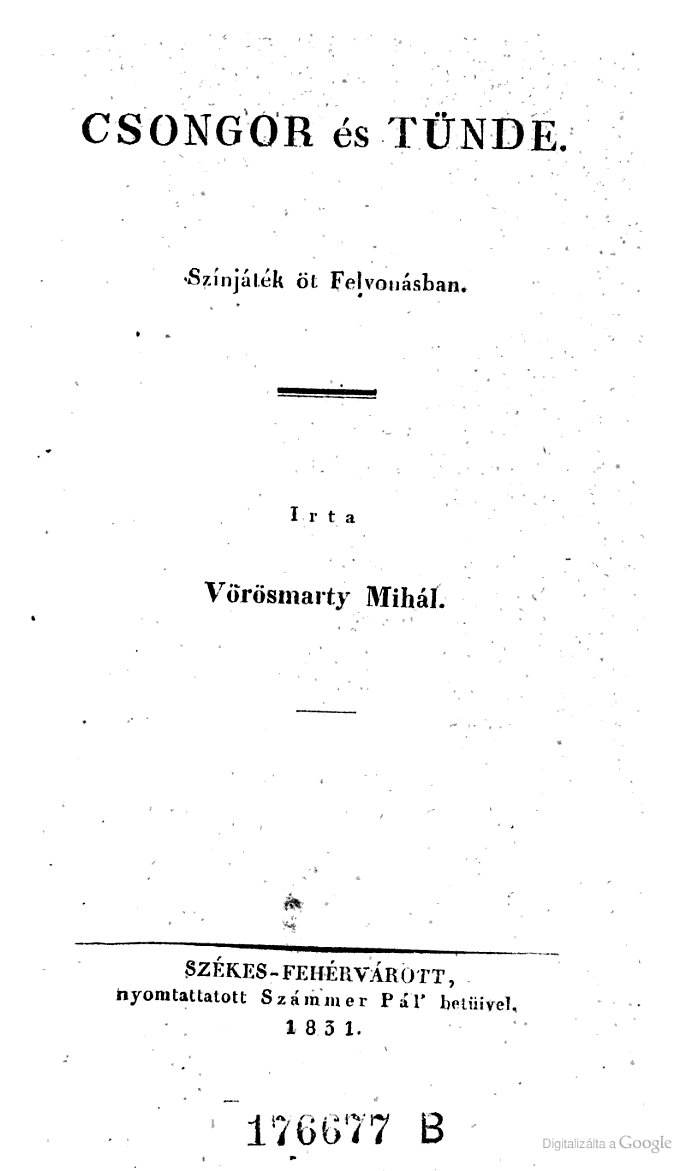
Csongor és Tünde

Csongor és Tünde is a Hungarian play, written by Mihály Vörösmarty. It is a five-act play that was inspired by Albert Gergei's Prince Árgirus and Shakespeare's A Midsummer Night's Dream.

It was first produced in 1830.
