= Historical composition of the National Assembly of Hungary =

This is a summary of the historical composition of the National Assembly of Hungary according to parties.

== During the dualism (1867-1918) ==
MSZDP / Independent Socialist Party / Left Centre / Far-Left / Independence Party / Moderate Opposition / Independence Party of 1848 / Principled Left Centre / Party of Independence and '48 / Deák Party / Liberal Party / National Party of Work / National Constitution Party / 48-er Constitution Party / Conservative Party / Catholic People's Party / National Antisemitic Party / Romanian National Party / Slovak National Party / Nationalities / Independent / Others
1865-1869	20 / 100 / 250 / 60
1869-1872	40 / 116 / 235 / 29
1872-1875	38 / 116 / 245 / 28
1875-1878	75 / 239 / 9 / 14
1878-1881	75 / 76 / 239 / 9 / 14
1881-1884	88 / 57 / 235 / 14 / 19
1884-1887	75 / 64 / 234 / 17 / 15 / 8
1887-1892	78 / 44 / 263 / 11 / 9 / 8
1892-1896	86 / 243 / 61 / 15 / 8
1896-1901	50 / 290 / 33 / 18 / 11 / 1 / 10
1901-1905	79 / 277 / 13 / 25 / 4 / 1 / 1 / 13
1905-1906	2 / 165 / 159 / 27 / 25 / 13 / 8 / 2 / 1 / 1 / 10
1906-1910	1 / 253 / 71 / 33 / 14 / 13 / 7 / 4 / 3 / 1
1910-1920	165 / 159 / 27 / 256 / 13 / 8 / 2 / 2 / 1 / 1 / 1 / 1

== 1945–1947 ==
FKGP / MKP / SZDP / NPP / DNP / SzP/MFP / FMDP / MRP / KNT / PDP / Others / Independent
Nov. 1945	70 / 69 / 23 / 2 / 245 / 12
Jun. 1947	70 / 69 / 21 / 1 / 187 / 2 / 21 / 49
Aug. 1947	100 / 67 / 36 / 3 / 6 / 68 / 4 / 18 / 60 / 49
Dec. 1947	100 / 67 / 36 / 3 / 6 / 68 / 4 / 19 / 61

== Historical composition of the National Assembly since 1990 ==
MSZP / SZDSZ / Egy. / LMP / MLP / Mom. / DK / Par. / Tisza / Fidesz / KDNP / MDF / FKGP / MIÉP / Jobbik / MHM / Germans / Others / Ind.
1990–1994	33 / 93 / 21 / 1 / 9 / 21 / 164 / 44
1994–1998	209 / 69 / 1 / 1 / 20 / 22 / 38 / 26
1998–2002	134 / 24 / 14 / 1 / 148 / 17 / 48
2002–2006	178 / 20 / 164 / 24
2006–2010	190 / 20 / 1 / 141 / 23 / 11
2010–2014	59 / 16 / 47 / 1 / 227 / 36
2014–2018	29 / 1 / 3 / 4 / 1 / 5 / 23 / 117 / 16
2018–2022	15 / 5 / 1 / 9 / 8 / 26 / 1 / 117 / 16
2022–2026	10 / 6 / 15 / 10 / 5 / 10 / 1 / 6 / 1 / 117 / 18
2026–2030	141 / 6 / 44 / 8

== See also ==
- National Assembly (Hungary)
- List of political parties in Hungary
