= 1906 Hungarian parliamentary election =

- 29 April–8 May 1906

All 413 elected seats in the Diet 207 seats needed for a majority
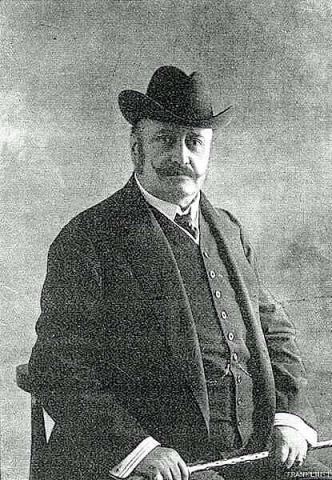

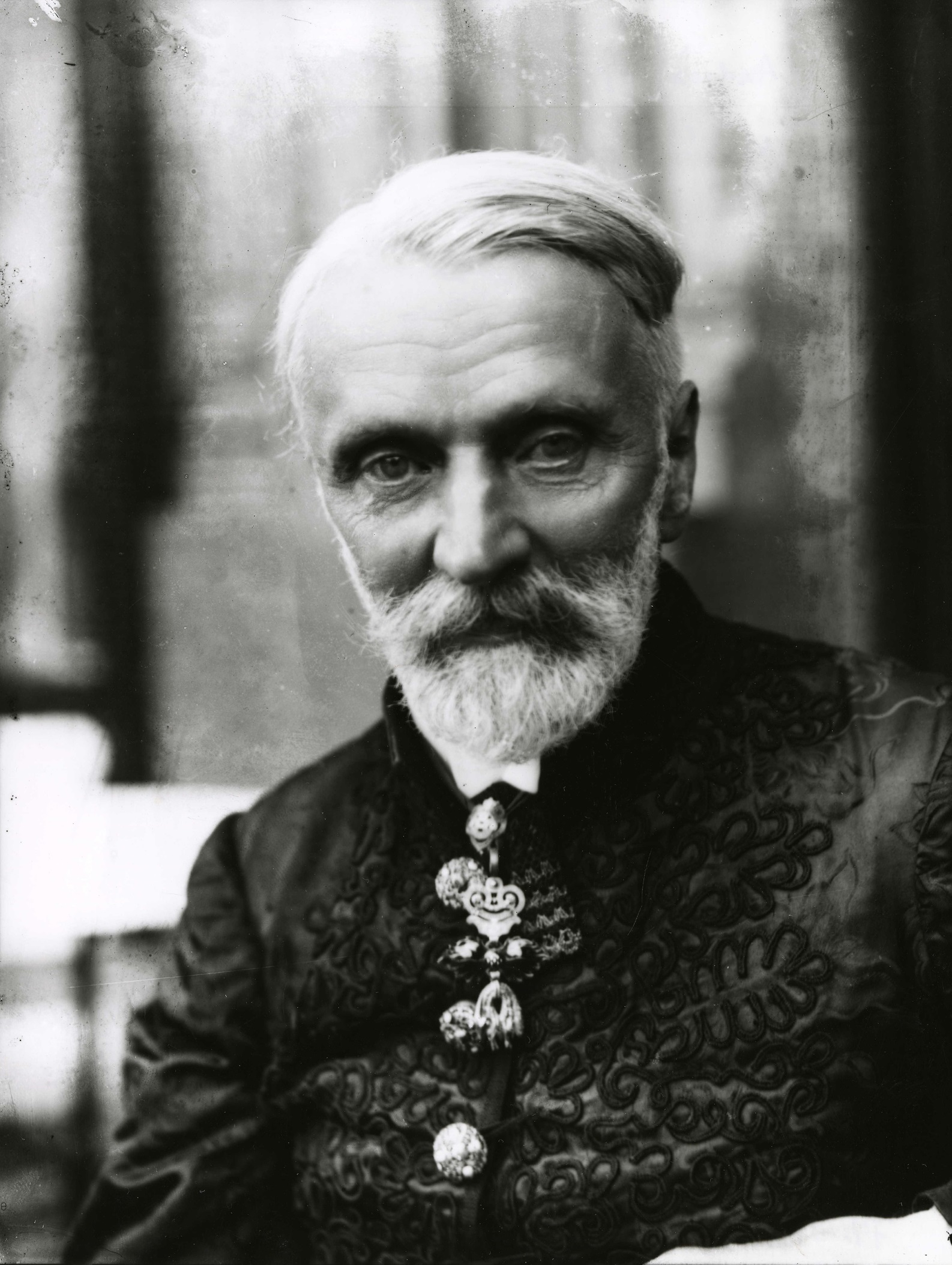

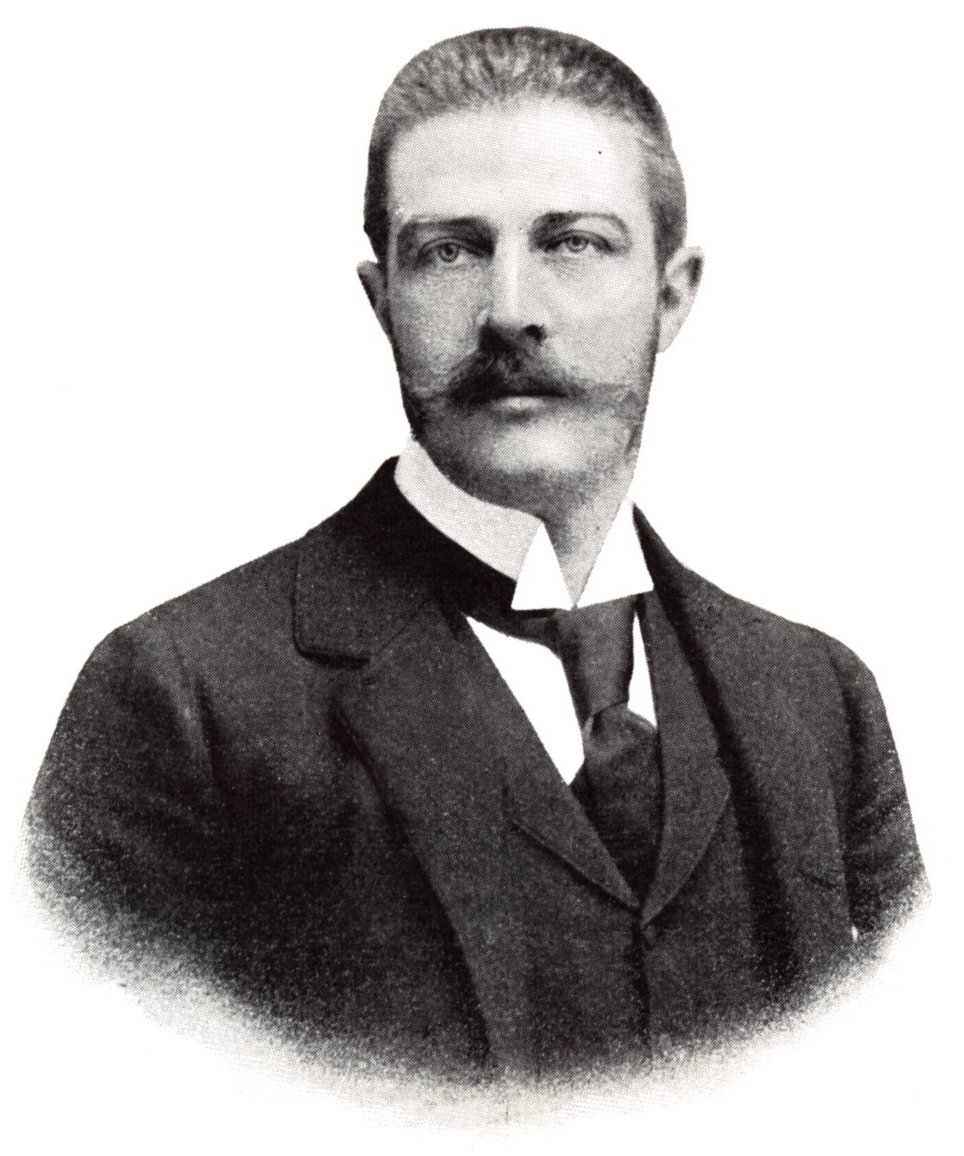

	First party	Second party	Third party
Leader	Ferenc Kossuth	Gyula Andrássy	Aladár Zichy
Party	F48P	OAP	KNP
Seats won	250 / 413	75 / 413	34 / 413
Seat change	▲82	▲51	▲9
Percentage	60.53%	18.16%	8.23%
	Fourth party
Leader	Gheorghe Pop de Băsești
Party	PNR
Last election	1.94%, 8 seats
Seats won	14 / 413
Seat change	▲6
Percentage	3.39%
Swing	▲1.45%
Prime Minister before election
Géza Fejérváry
Independent
Prime Minister after election
Sándor Wekerle
OAP

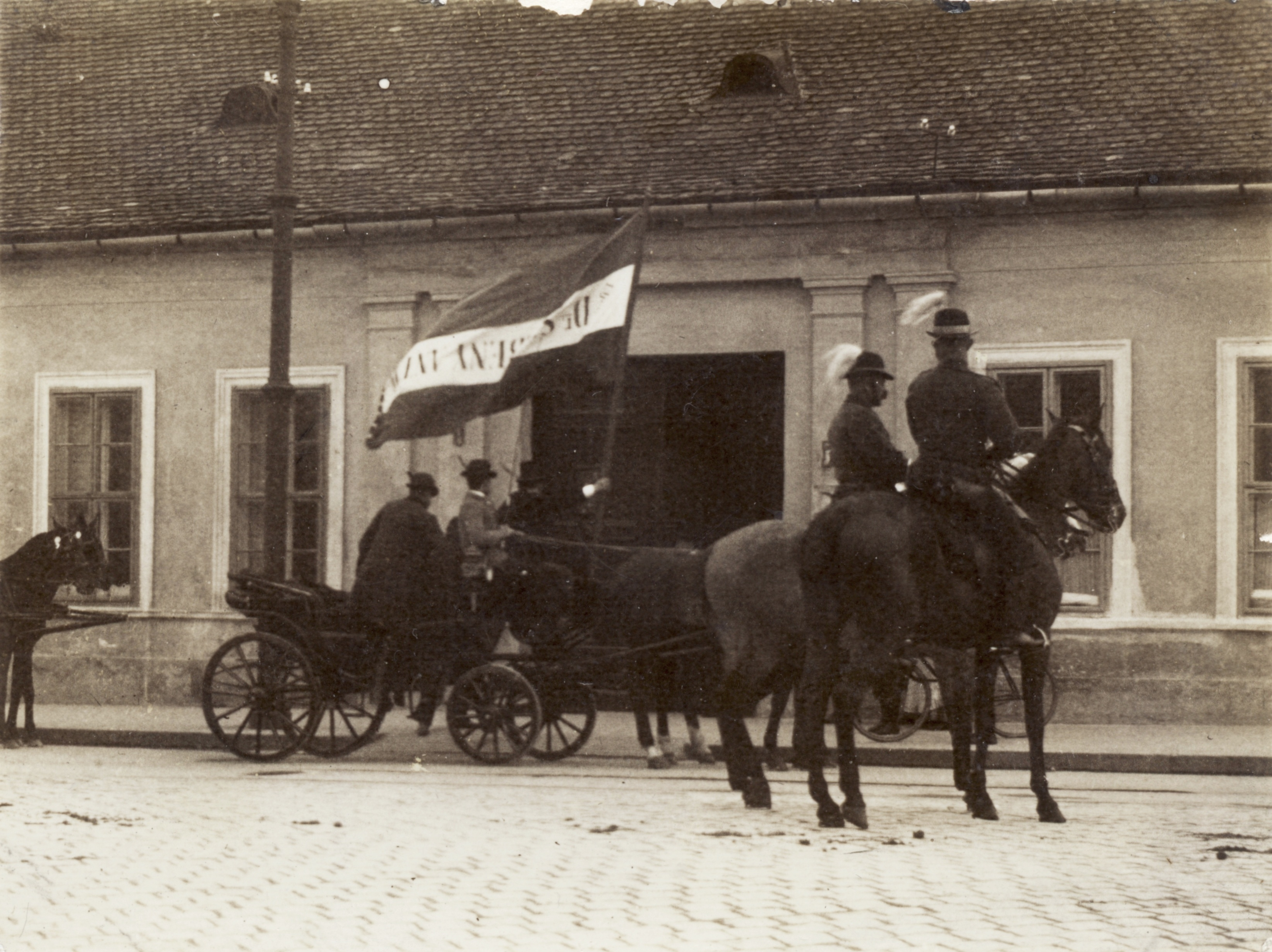
Campaign procession with flags on Krisztina körút, Budapest

Parliamentary elections were held in Hungary between 29 April and 8 May 1906. After the previous elections, a political stalemate had developed, as Franz Joseph I refused to appoint a politician who had the support of the parliamentary majority. After the government lost its support, the parliament called on the county authorities in a resolution to refuse obedience. The government withheld the salaries of the officials who joined the resistance, but the counties compensated them and protested because of the violation of their autonomy. The monarch presented his terms of appointment to the representatives of the parliamentary majority in the autumn of 1905, who rejected it. Baron Géza Fejérváry and Ferenc Kossuth reached an agreement and the Liberal Party was dissolved in April 1906. Based on the secret pact, the opposition coalition renounced the reform of the army and accepted the maintenance of the Austro-Hungarian customs union in exchange for the reform of the suffrage. The elections were aimed at strengthening the new government led by Sándor Wekerle, who became a member of the Constitution Party, a new party formed by Dissidents who broke away from the Liberal Party. After the New Party was no longer part of the opposition coalition, it disbanded before the elections. Two agrarian socialist parties already ran in this election, the Reorganized Social Democratic Party of Hungary, which split from the Social Democratic Party of Hungary, and the Hungarian Independent Socialist Peasant Party, founded by András Áchim. The new Parliament convened on May 21, 1906.

== Parties and leaders ==
Party	Leader
Party of Independence and '48 (F48P)	Ferenc Kossuth
National Constitution Party (OAP)	Gyula Andrássy
Catholic People's Party (KNP)	Aladár Zichy
Romanian National Party (PNR)	Gheorghe Pop
Slovak National Party (SNS)	Pavol Mudroň
Serb People's Radical Party (SNRS)	Jaša Tomić
Civic Democratic Party (PDP)	Vilmos Vázsonyi
Reorganized Social Democratic Party of Hungary (MÚSZDP)	Vilmos Mezőfi
Hungarian Independent Socialist Peasant Party (MFSZPP)	András Áchim

== Electoral system ==
The elections were based on property, income and education census. Landowners with a ¼ plot of land, rural industrialists paying a tax of 6 Ft, urban industrialists paying a tax of 10.50 Ft, house tenants paying a tax of 15.75 Ft, land and house owners paying a tax of 5 Ft, landless house owners paying a tax of 6 Ft, employed priests, officials, teachers, tutors, writers, artists, lawyers, notaries and health workers with a degree were electors. 20 years older men were eligible to vote and 24 years older men could be elected. Women had no right for the participation. The elections were held exclusively in single-member district by open voting.

== Results ==
Party	Seats	+/–
Party of Independence and '48	250	+82
National Constitution Party	75	+51
Catholic People's Party	34	+9
Independent moderate	22	+11
Romanian National Party	14	+6
Slovak National Party	7	+6
Serb People's Radical Party	4	+3
Civic Democratic Party	3	+1
Independent '67ers	2	+2
Reorganized Social Democratic Party of Hungary	1	-1
Hungarian Independent Socialist Peasant Party	1	New
Total	413	–
Source: Ballabás-Pap-Pál

The group of independents are classified by their political position as 67'ers and moderate opposition.

== Aftermath ==
The failure of the government to control social tensions and implement reforms caused internal tension within the Party of Independence and '48. They also lost popularity with the publication of the Fejérváry-Kossuth Pact. András Áchim's mandate was declared null and void by the Curia of Hungary, meaning his party lost its parliamentary representation.
