= Handkerchief vote =

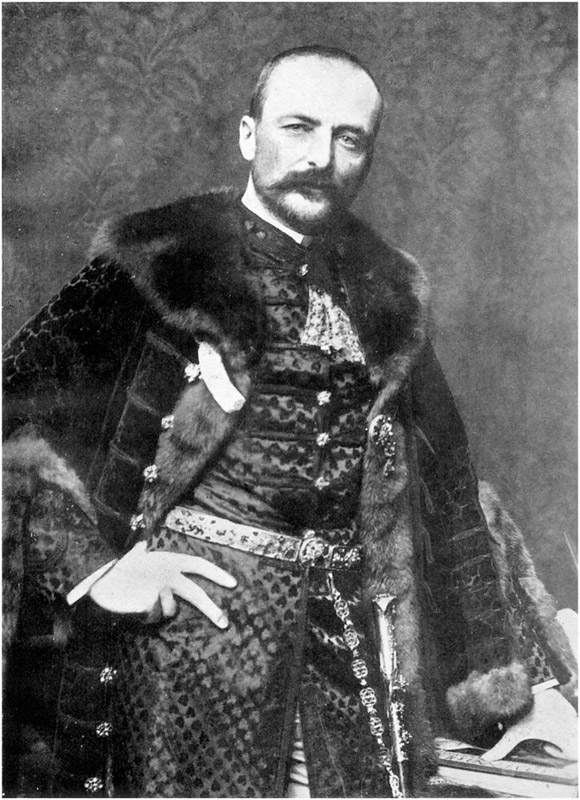
Prime minister István Tisza

The handkerchief vote (Hungarian: zsebkendőszavazás, pronounced [ˈʒɛpkɛndøːˈsɒvɒzaːʃ]) was a parliamentary vote which took place on 18 November 1904 in the Diet of Hungary.

== History ==
=== Background ===
The Austro-Hungarian compromise and its supporting Liberal Party remained bitterly unpopular among the ethnic Hungarian voters, and the continuous successes of the pro-compromise Liberal Party in the Hungarian parliamentary elections caused long lasting frustration among Hungarian voters. The ethnic minorities had the key-role in the political maintenance of the compromise in Hungary, because they were able to vote the pro-compromise liberal party into the position of the majority/ruling parties of the Hungarian parliament. The pro-compromise liberal parties were the most popular among ethnic minority voters, however the Slovak-Serb-Romanian minority parties have remained unpopular among the ethnic minorities. The nationalist Hungarian parties - which were supported by the overwhelming majority of ethnic Hungarian voters - have always remained in the opposition. The only short exception was the 1906-1910 period, where the Hungarian supported nationalist parties could form government.

The Liberal Party had been ruling Hungary for almost 30 years with an iron hand and at the service of the Hungarian elite. The opposition responded to this alleged injustice with so-called obstruction or filibustering with the aim of stopping or delaying the adoption of new legislation. The Széll Government managed to temporarily break through this obstruction in 1902 by concluding an agreement with the opposition parties, but from 1903 the opposition re-applied the obstruction.

The parliamentary rules of procedure in the dualism in Hungary followed the common law of feudal Parliament, according to which everybody could speak as much as they wished: so, the most prominent speakers could speak up to 4–8 hours in public. However, this paralyzed the procedure of the Hungarian legislature. For decades, the opposition often used this "ancient weapon" against the governments in the case of extremely important or disputed issues. In the case of money bills this situation could become extremely dangerous for the security of the country.

When István Tisza became prime minister in 1903, these opposition protests were cracked down. He also insisted on a change in the house rules of the House of Representatives, the lower house of the Diet, in order to deal with the obstruction.

=== The vote ===
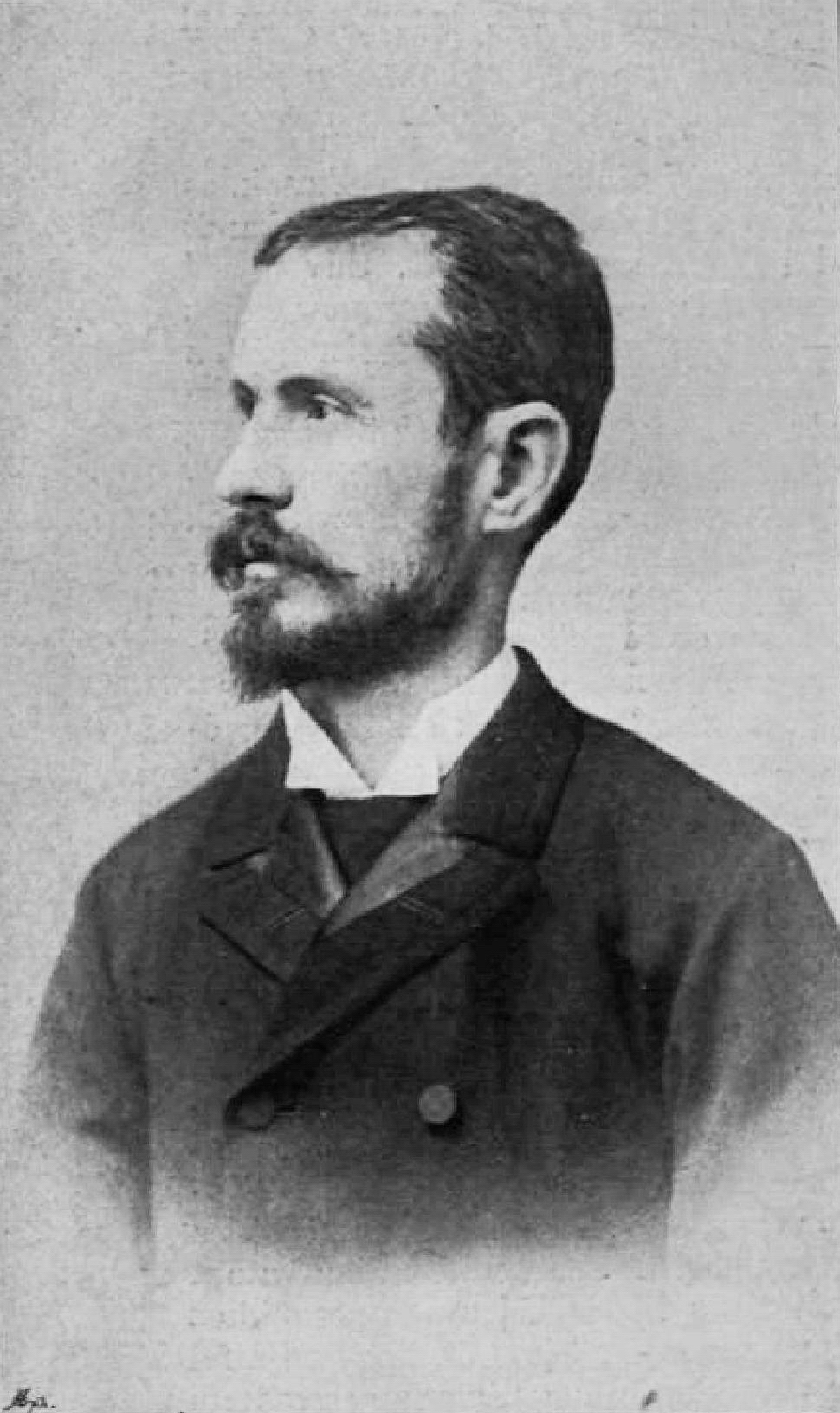
Dezső Perczel, President of the House of Representatives

After a speech by István Tisza on 18 November 1904, a representative of the Liberal Party, Gábor Daniel, submitted a motion to change the house rules of the House of Representatives. This motion implied that the competences of the opposition were curtailed and had to put an end to the obstruction. During the following commotion, the President of the House of Representatives, Dezső Perczel, suddenly declared that the proposal had been adopted and that the session was suspended.

The testimonies of what had happened exactly varied, but it is believed that President Perczel had silently called for the proposal to be immediately voted on, waving a handkerchief as a sign for the Liberal Party representatives to say "yes" to vote. Hence the name "handkerchief vote". This manoeuvre caused much commotion and Kálmán Széll and Gyula Andrássy left the Liberal Party to join the opposition. When the parliamentary session was resumed on 13 December 1904, the opposition persisted in its obstruction and the mood rose to such an extent that the furniture of the House of Representatives was even destroyed and order services were attacked with the furniture.

=== Consequences ===
Other members of the House of Representatives, such as Gyula Wlassics, Pál Teleki and Miklós Bánffy also left the Liberal Party. Initially, under the leadership of Gyula Andrássy, they called themselves the "Dissidents" and joined the united opposition, the "Coalition," in the 1905 elections. After the elections, some of them founded the National Constitution Party.

The 1905 elections meant a big loss for the Liberal Party and a big win for the united opposition, but nevertheless King Franz Joseph left the Tisza Government in office for a few months. Eventually the king appointed a new government under the leadership of the officer Géza Fejérváry, who did not have a parliamentary majority. In this respect, the handkerchief vote eventually led to the Hungarian crisis of 1905-1906. After about a third of the Liberal Party deputies left the party during the Hungarian crisis, the Liberal Party was finally dissolved in 1906. Eventually, the remaining ones established the National Party of Work in 1910.
