= 1905 Hungarian parliamentary election =

- 26 January–4 February 1905

All 413 elected seats in the Diet 207 seats needed for a majority
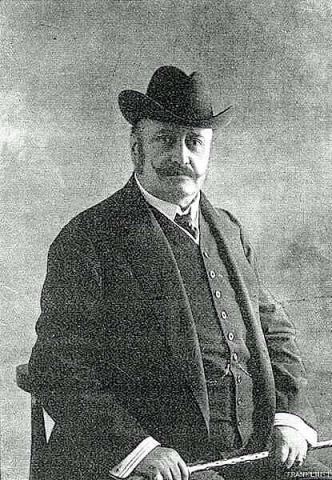

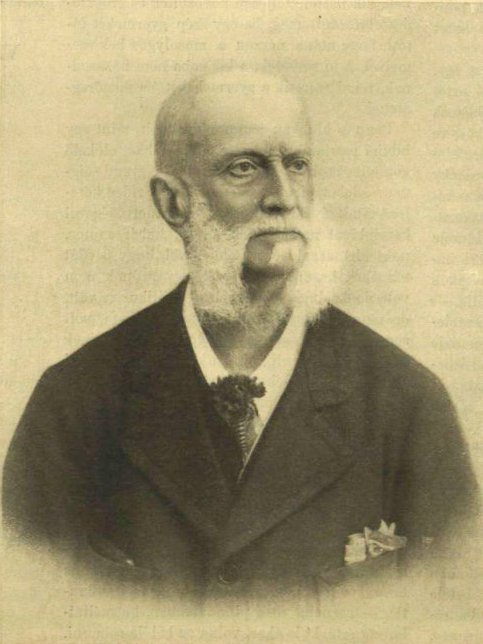

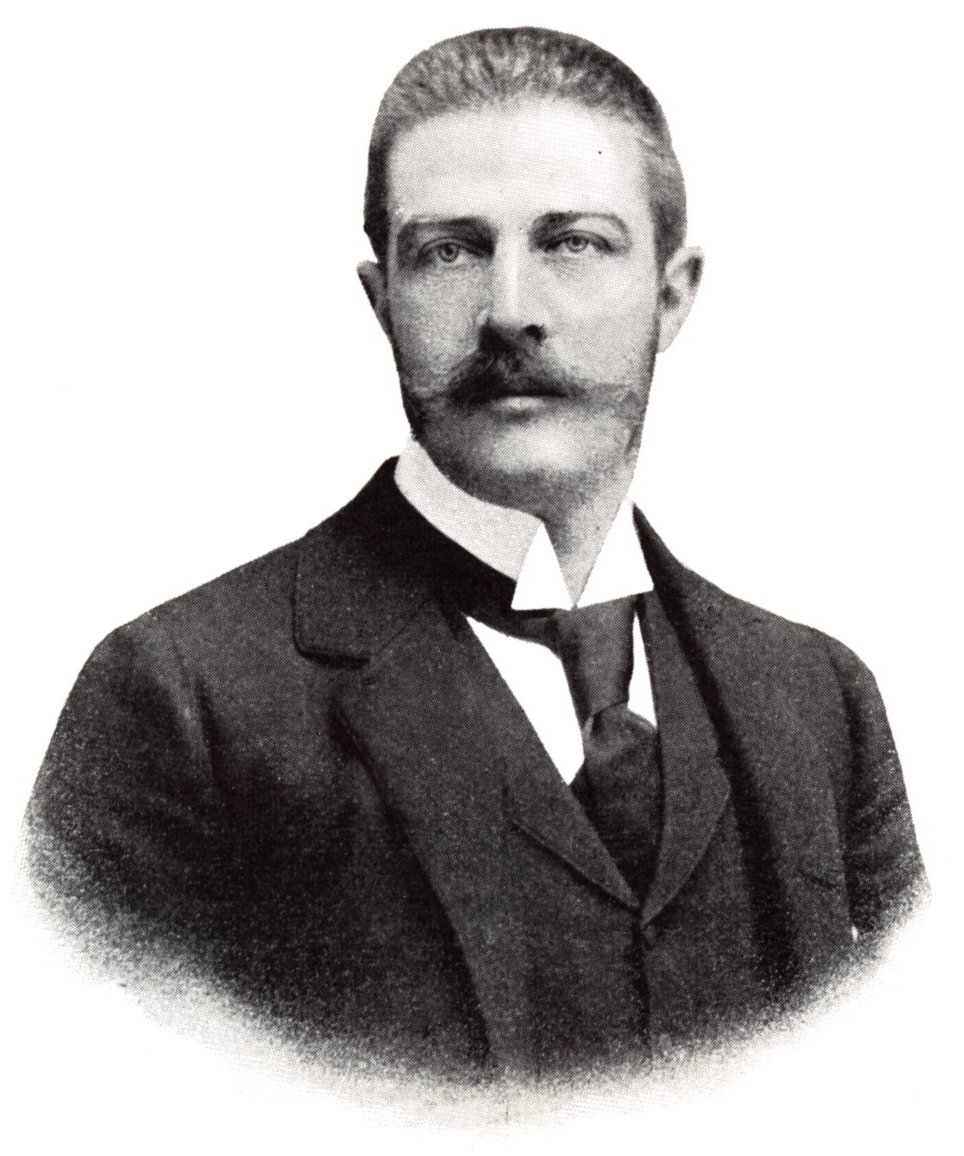

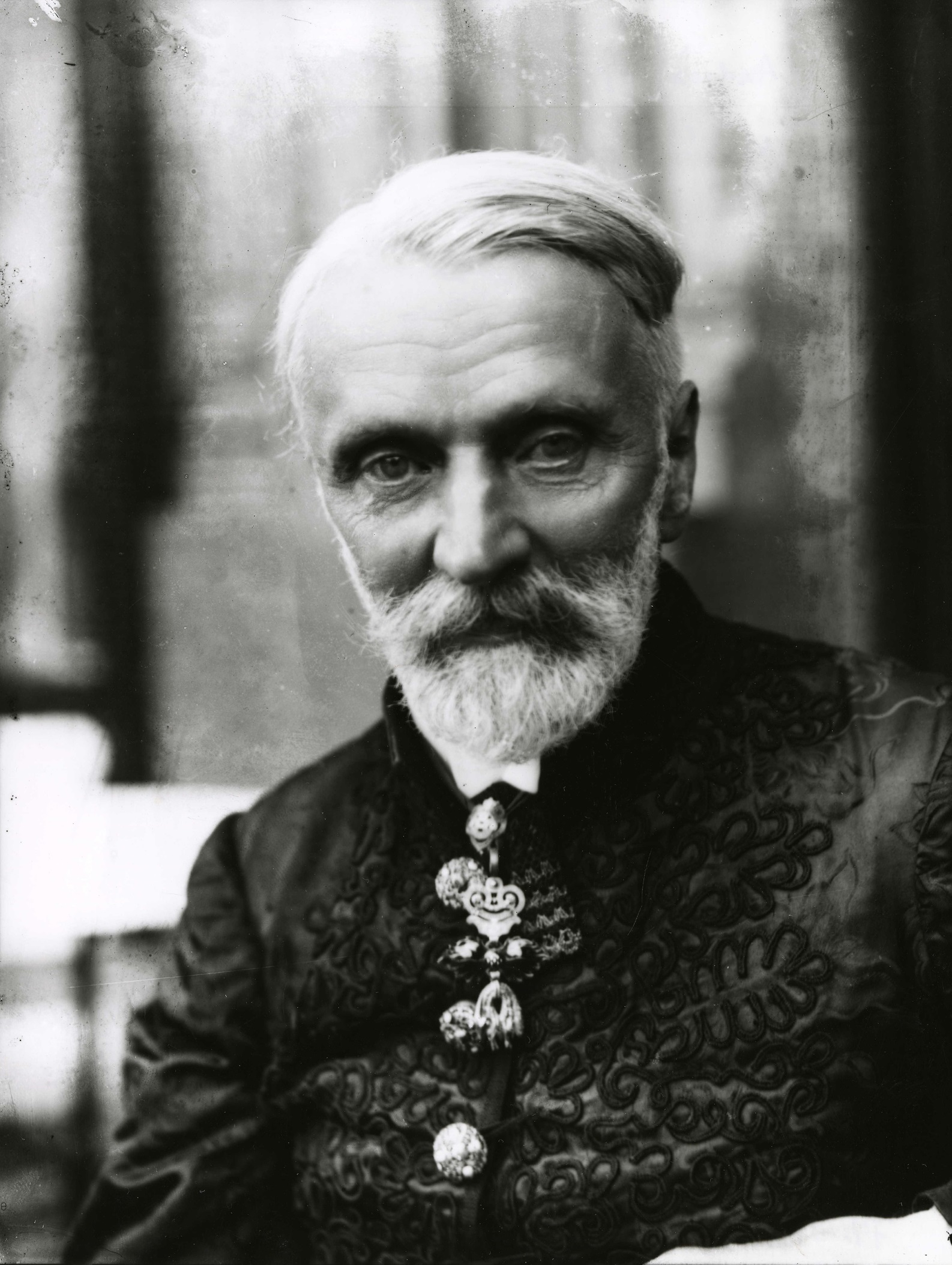

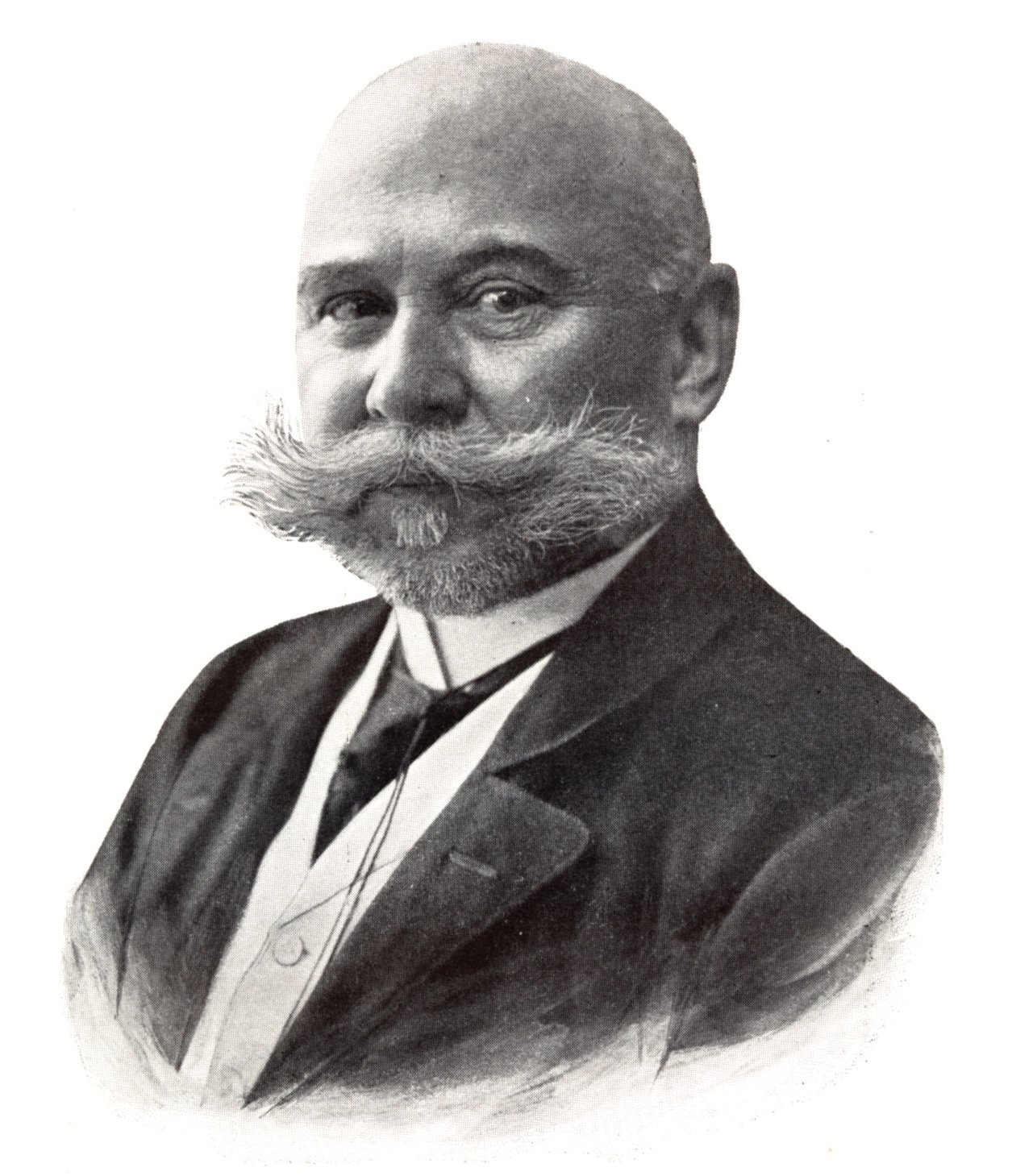

	First party	Second party	Third party
Leader	Ferenc Kossuth	Frigyes Podmaniczky	Aladár Zichy
Party	F48P	SZP	KNP
Seats won	168 / 413	157 / 413	25 / 413
Seat change	▲92	▼123	▲3
Percentage	40.68%	38.02%	6.05%
	Fourth party	Fifth party	Sixth party
Leader	Gyula Andrássy	Dezső Bánffy	Gheorghe Pop de Băsești
Party	DIS	ÚP	PNR
Seats won	24 / 413	13 / 413	8 / 413
Seat change	New	New	New
Percentage	5.81%	3.15%	1.94
Prime Minister before election
István Tisza
SZP
Prime Minister after election
István Tisza
SZP

Parliamentary elections were held between 26 January and 4 February 1905. The result was a victory for the Party of Independence and '48, marking the first time the Liberal Party had lost power since 1875. The result mostly influenced by the Handkerchief vote. The Prime Minister Count István Tisza presented his proposal for amending the House Rules in a public letter to his constituents on October 8, 1904, with which he intended to reform the functioning of the parliament. According to the rules, a House Rules Review Committee should have been set up for this by the House of the Representatives, but the opposition did not agree to this. Instead, the amendment proposal was submitted by Gábor Dániel on November 18, 1904, and after the Prime Minister's speech – at 9:30 in the evening – Speaker Dezső Perczel signaled for a vote with a handkerchief. The ruling party members stood up by the signal, thus accepting the proposal. The proposal (Lex Daniel) was adopted with multiple violations of the House Rules, and it is not even certain whether the Speaker put the question to a vote. The next day, Count Gyula Andrássy and his followers left the Liberal Party (Dissidents) and entered into a coalition with the opposition parties. The united opposition asked the king to annul the Lex Daniel and the government to resign. The opposition members smashed the furniture in the meeting room of the House of Representatives on December 13, 1904. The Prime Minister announced early parliamentary elections on December 16, which was also illegal because the parliament had not adopted the budget, thus creating an ex lex situation. One of the leaders of the Dissidents, Count Albert Apponyi, admitted that the opposition also bore responsibility for the situation. Prior the election the Ugron Party of Independence and '48 merged into the Party of Independence and '48. The former prime minister Dezső Bánffy founded the New Party, and many members of the Liberal Party join to it.

== Parties and leaders ==
Party	Leader
Party of Independence and '48 (F48P)	Ferenc Kossuth
Liberal Party (SZP)	Frigyes Podmaniczky
Catholic People's Party (KNP)	Aladár Zichy
Liberal Party dissidents (DIS)	Gyula Andrássy
New Party (ÚP)	Dezső Bánffy
Romanian National Party (PNR)	Gheorghe Pop
Reorganized Social Democratic Party of Hungary (MÚSZDP)	Vilmos Mezőfi
Civic Democratic Party (PDP)	Vilmos Vázsonyi
Serb People's Radical Party (SNRS)	Jaša Tomić
Slovak National Party (SNS)	Pavol Mudroň

== Electoral system ==
The elections were based on property, income and education census. Landowners with a ¼ plot of land, rural industrialists paying a tax of 6 Ft, urban industrialists paying a tax of 10.50 Ft, house tenants paying a tax of 15.75 Ft, land and house owners paying a tax of 5 Ft, landless house owners paying a tax of 6 Ft, employed priests, officials, teachers, tutors, writers, artists, lawyers, notaries and health workers with a degree were electors. 20 years older men were eligible to vote and 24 years older men could be elected. Women had no right for the participation. The elections were held exclusively in single-member district by open voting.

== Results ==
Party	Seats	+/–
Party of Independence and '48	168	+92
Liberal Party	157	-123
Catholic People's Party	25	+3
Liberal Party dissidents	24	New
New Party	13	New
Independent moderate	11	+6
Romanian National Party	8	+8
Reorganized Social Democratic Party of Hungary	2	New
Civic Democratic Party	2	+1
Independent '48ers	1	+1
Serb People's Radical Party	1	0
Slovak National Party	1	-2
Total	413	–
Source: Ballabás-Pap-Pál

The group of independents are classified by their political position as 48'ers and moderate opposition.

== Aftermath ==
King Franz Joseph I refused to appoint an opposition leader to Prime Minister who demanded reform of the military and suffrage and increase Hungarian autonomy. The heir to the throne, Archduke Franz Ferdinand, actively supported this and plans for a military occupation of the country were also prepared. Finally, the monarch appointed Baron Géza Fejérváry as prime minister in June 1905. The National Assembly also declared the mandates of two members of the Liberal Party null and void. Miklós Serbán was then re-elected, but István Rudnay was replaced by Valér Smialowszky, the candidate of the Party of Independence and '48.
