= 1896 Hungarian parliamentary election =

- 29 October–4 November 1896

All 413 seats in the Diet 207 seats needed for a majority
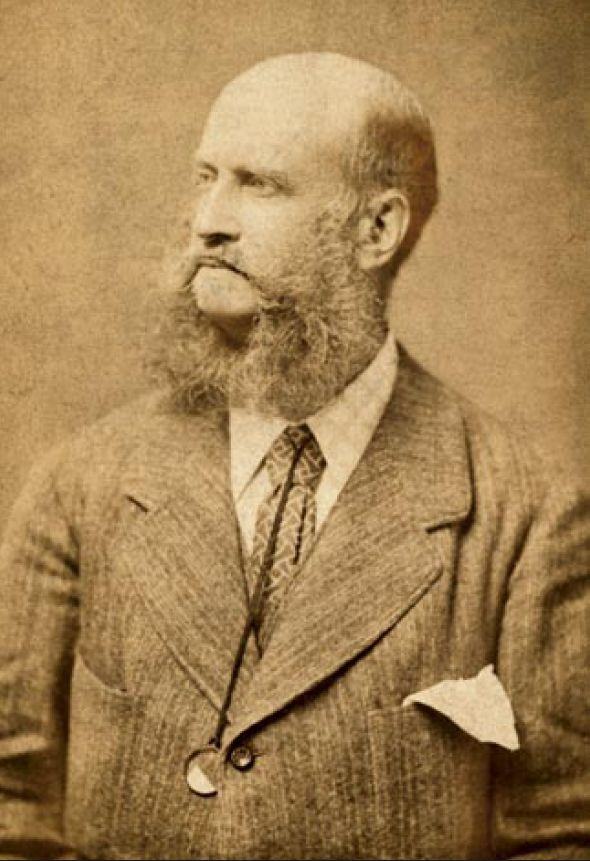

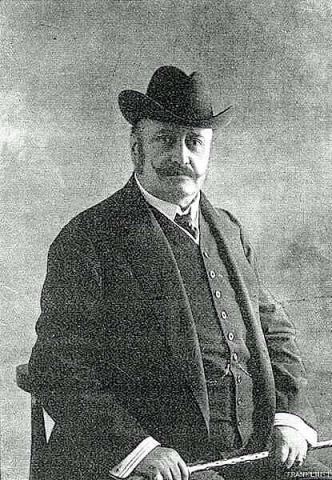

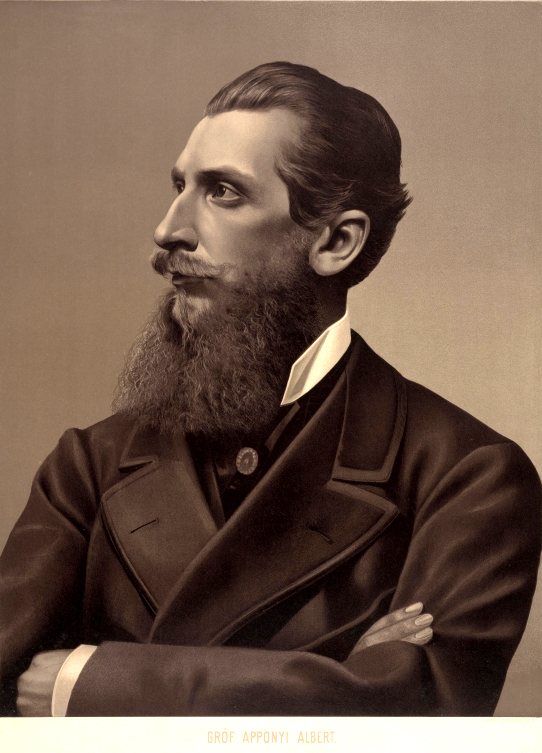
	First party	Second party	Third party
Leader	Frigyes Podmaniczky	Ferenc Kossuth	Albert Apponyi
Party	SZP	F48P	NP
Seats won	291 / 413	48 / 413	33 / 413
Seat change	▲46	▼39	▼29
Percentage	70.46%	11.62%	7.99%
Prime Minister before election
Dezső Bánffy
SZP
Prime Minister after election
Dezső Bánffy
SZP

Parliamentary elections were held in Hungary between 29 October and 4 November 1896. Before the elections, church-political issues became decisive. The parliament adopted compulsory civil marriage, regulated the religion of children born from interfaith marriages, and introduced state registration. The state recognized the three organisations of the Hungarian Jewish community, as legal churches. In addition to the Liberal Party, the reforms were supported by the Party of Independence and '48, but were opposed by the Roman Catholic, Greek Catholic, Romanian Orthodox, Serbian Orthodox churches, and the Ugron Party of Independence and '48. Opponents of the reform formed the Catholic People's Party in January 1895 under the leadership of Count Nándor Zichy. Under time of the festivities of the Hungarian Millenium suspended the political fight by the parties (treuga dei). At that time, the Grand Boulevard, the Franz Joseph Bridge and the underground tram line were opened to traffic. However, the 1896 elections were, according to contemporary recollections, the most corrupt and brutal elections in Austria-Hungary. During the elections were 32 persons killed. The new parliament convened on November 25, 1896.

== Parties and leaders ==
Party	Leader
Liberal Party (SZP)	Frigyes Podmaniczky
Party of Independence and '48 (F48P)	Ferenc Kossuth
National Party (NP)	Albert Apponyi
Catholic People's Party (KNP)	Nándor Zichy
Ugron Party of Independence and '48 (F48UP)	Gábor Ugron

== Electoral system ==
The elections were based on property, income and education census. Landowners with a ¼ plot of land, rural industrialists paying a tax of 6 Ft, urban industrialists paying a tax of 10.50 Ft, house tenants paying a tax of 15.75 Ft, land and house owners paying a tax of 5 Ft, landless house owners paying a tax of 6 Ft, employed priests, officials, teachers, tutors, writers, artists, lawyers, notaries and health workers with a degree were electors. 20 years older men were eligible to vote and 24 years older men could be elected. Women had no right for the participation. The elections were held exclusively in single-member district by open voting.

== Results ==
Party	Seats	+/–
Liberal Party	291	+46
Party of Independence and '48	48	-39
National Party	33	-29
Catholic People's Party	20	New
Ugron Party of Independence and '48	11	-3
Independent moderate	7	+3
Independent '67ers	2	+1
Independent '48ers	1	+1
Total	413	–
Source: Ballabás-Pap-Pál

The group of independents are classified by their political position as 48'ers, 67'ers and moderate opposition.

== Aftermath ==
After the elections, the opposition obstructed the work of the legislature in connection with the renewal of the customs and trade alliance with Cisleithania. The government wanted to renew the agreement in such a way that in the future the consent of the parliament would not be necessary for its renewal. Due to the non-acceptance of the budget, an ex lex situation developed by 1899.
