= 1901 Hungarian parliamentary election =

- 2–9 October 1901

All 413 seats in the Diet 207 seats needed for a majority
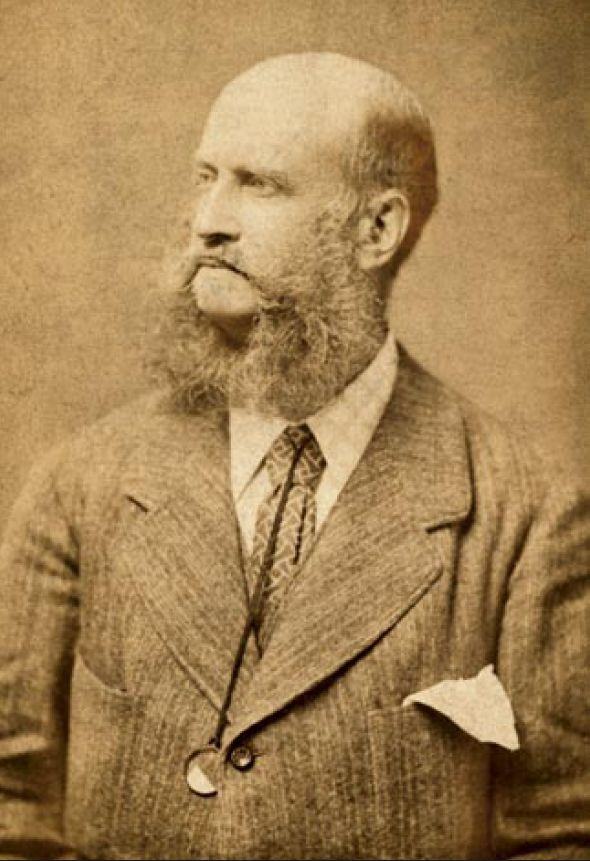

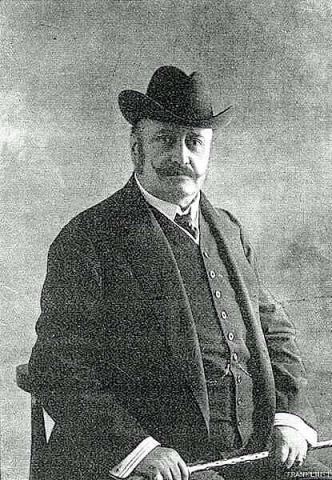

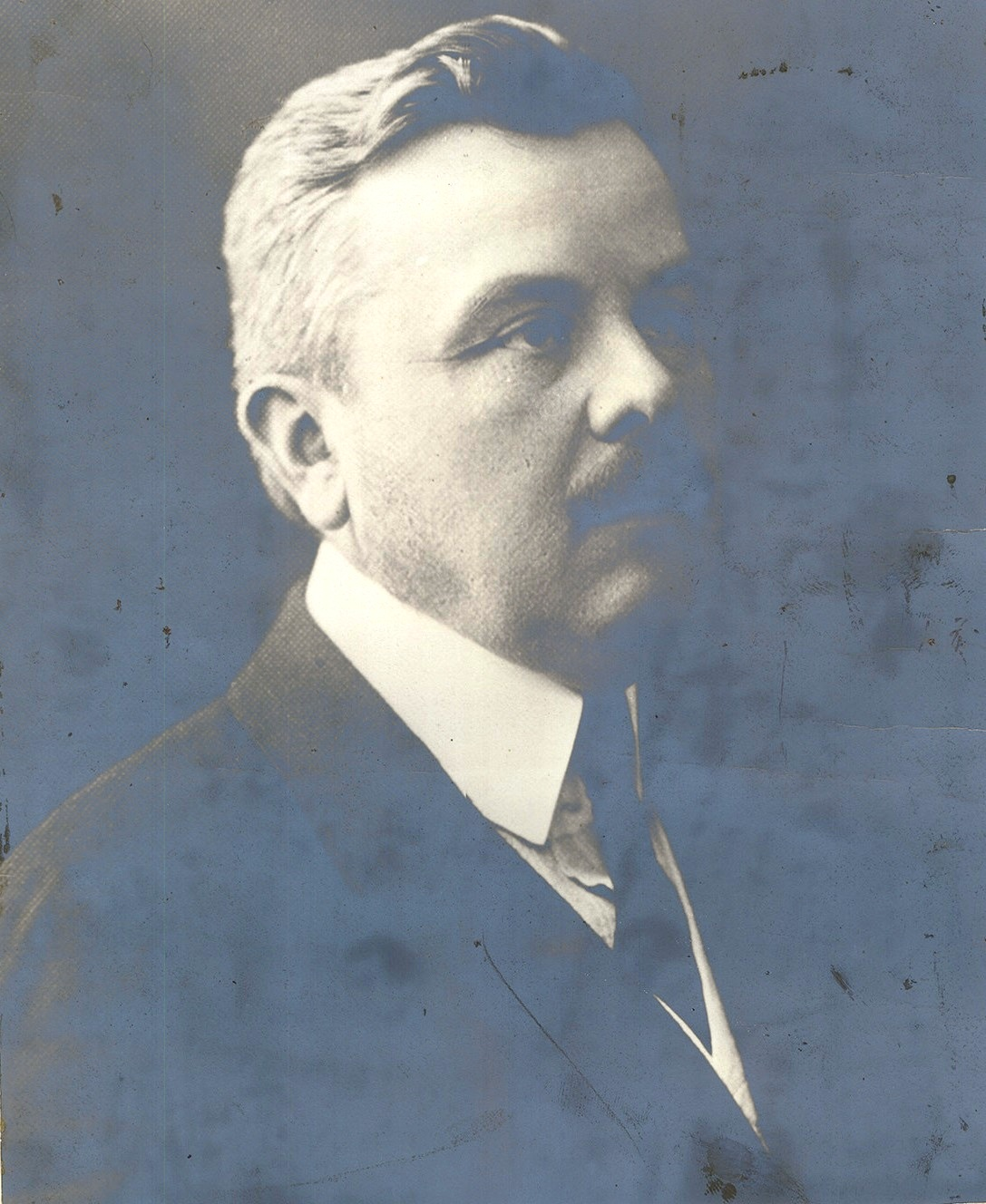
	First party	Second party	Third party
Leader	Frigyes Podmaniczky	Ferenc Kossuth	János Zichy
Party	SZP	F48P	KNP
Seats won	280 / 413	76 / 413	22 / 413
Seat change	▼11	▲28	▲2
Percentage	67.80%	18.40%	5.33%
Prime Minister before election
Kálmán Széll
SZP
Prime Minister after election
Kálmán Széll
SZP

Parliamentary elections were held in Hungary between 2 and 9 October 1901. Prime Minister Kálmán Széll, who came to power in 1899, reached an agreement with the opposition through the mediation of Dezső Szilágyi. As a result, the ex lex situation due to the lack of a budget was lifted and the customs and trade alliance with Cisleithania was renewed. The government pursued a protectionist policy by raising agricultural tariffs, thus ensuring the saleability of domestic products against American imports. According to the laws adopted in 1901, members of parliament could no longer play a leading economic role in the industrial and commercial spheres. The government paid special attention to the modernization of agriculture. In the south and southeast of the country, arable land was provided to the poor, while the employment relations of agricultural workers and servants, tobacco growers and forestry workers were regulated. Before the elections, the National Party led by Count Albert Apponyi was dissolved and its members joined the governing Liberal Party. The new parliament convened on October 26, 1901.

== Parties and leaders ==
Party	Leader
Liberal Party (SZP)	Frigyes Podmaniczky
Party of Independence and '48 (F48P)	Ferenc Kossuth
Catholic National Party (KNP)	János Zichy
Ugron Party of Independence and '48 (F48UP)	Gábor Ugron
Slovak National Party (SNS)	Pavol Mudroň
Civic Democratic Party (PDP)	Vilmos Vázsonyi
Serb People's Radical Party (SNRS)	Jaša Tomić

== Electoral system ==
The elections were based on property, income and education census. Landowners with a ¼ plot of land, rural industrialists paying a tax of 6 Ft, urban industrialists paying a tax of 10.50 Ft, house tenants paying a tax of 15.75 Ft, land and house owners paying a tax of 5 Ft, landless house owners paying a tax of 6 Ft, employed priests, officials, teachers, tutors, writers, artists, lawyers, notaries and health workers with a degree were electors. 20 years older men were eligible to vote and 24 years older men could be elected. Women had no right for the participation. The elections were held exclusively in single-member district by open voting.

== Results ==
Party	Seats	+/–
Liberal Party	280	-11
Party of Independence and '48	76	+28
Catholic People's Party	22	+2
Ugron Party of Independence and '48	14	+3
Independent Saxons	11	+11
Independent moderate	5	-2
Slovak National Party	3	New
Civic Democratic Party	1	New
Serb People's Radical Party	1	New
Total	413	–
Source: Ballabás-Pap-Pál

The group of independents are classified by their political position as moderate opposition or ethnic minority.

== Aftermath ==
The court annulled the mandates of 5 representatives, 4 from the Liberal Party and 1 from the Independent Party. In each case, by-elections were held.
