= Stodoła =

Stodoła or Stodola is a surname. Notable people with the surname include:

- Aurel Stodola (1859–1942), Slovak engineer, physicist, and inventor
- Edwin King Stodola (1914–1992), American radio engineer
- Emil Stodola (1862-1945), Slovak politician and lawyer
- Ivan Stodola (1888–1977), Slovak dramatist and writer
- Mark Stodola (born 1949), American politician and lawyer

== See also ==
- 3981 Stodola, minor planet
