= National Constitution Party =

National Constitution Party Országos Alkotmánypárt
- Historical leaders: Sándor Wekerle, János Hadik
- Founded: November 18, 1905
- Dissolved: October 29, 1918
- Headquarters: Budapest, Kingdom of Hungary
- Ideology: Classical liberalism Pro-Compromise; National liberalism
- Political position: Centre-right
- Colours: Green

The National Constitution Party (Hungarian: Országos Alkotmánypárt, pronounced [ˈorsaːɡoʃ ˈɒlkotmaːɲˈpaːrt]), or simply Constitution Party, was a political party in Hungary from 1905 to 1910 and from 1913 to 1918.

== History ==
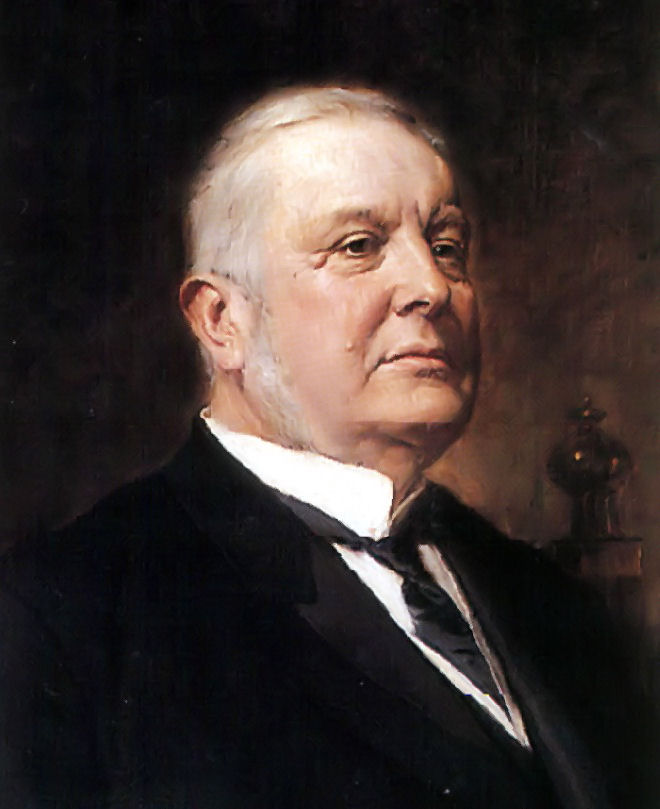
Sándor Wekerle

The National Constitution Party was established on 18 November 1905 by the so-called group of "Dissidents", who formerly left the governing Liberal Party after the scandalous "handkerchief vote". The group was led by Gyula Andrássy the Younger. The Dissidents immediately joined the electoral alliance of opposition parties, the Coalition, which won a surprise victory in the 1905 parliamentary election.

When the political crisis was over after the 1906 parliamentary election, the Constitution Party strengthened its position within the Coalition, as Party of Independence and '48 vainly obtained the highest number of votes, Emperor-King Francis Joseph I did not accept the election results, because the Independence Party did not support the Austro-Hungarian Compromise of 1867, thus questioned the very foundation of the system. As a result, the monarch instructed the Constitution Party, which had '67 ideology, to form and dominate a government over the other allied parties. The designate Prime Minister Sándor Wekerle joined Constitution Party before the appointment, while Gyula Andrássy, Jr., Ignác Darányi and Lajos Jekelfalussy became ministers in the Wekerle II Cabinet.

Shortly before the 1910 parliamentary election, Andrássy and his party joined the newly formed conservative-liberal National Party of Work. Due to internal tensions, Andrássy and his supporters left the governing party and re-established the National Constitution Party in September 1913. Count János Hadik was elected its leader. On 25 January 1918, some of the party members under the leadership of Prime Minister Wekerle, left the party to form the Constitution Party of '48, which would have been a strong governing party for the proposed 1918 parliamentary election. Hadik and his supporters remained in the National Constitution Party. Hadik was appointed Prime Minister on 30 October 1918 by Charles IV, however the Aster Revolution swept away the dual monarchy. The party was banned, among others, in November 1918.

== Election results ==
Election year	National Assembly		Government
Election year	Overall seats	+/–	Government
1905	27 / 413		in government
1906	71 / 413	▲44	in government

== Leaders ==
Picture	Name	Term start	Term end	Date of birth	Date of death	Notes
	Gyula Andrássy	1905	1906	June 30, 1860	June 11, 1929	De facto leader until 1918; Minister of Interior (1906–1910); Foreign Minister of Austria-Hungary (1918)
	Kálmán Széll	1906	1910	June 8, 1843	August 16, 1915	
The National Constitution Party joined National Party of Work between 1910 and 1913
	János Hadik	1913	1918	November 23, 1863	December 10, 1933	Prime Minister (1918)
