= New Party (Hungary) =

New Party Új Párt
- Leader: Dezső Bánffy
- Founder: Dezső Bánffy
- Founded: March 1904
- Dissolved: March 1906
- Split from: Liberal Party
- Merged into: Party of Independence and '48
- Ideology: Hungarian ultranationalism (Ethnic); Chauvinism; Habsburg monarchism Magyarization; Ideology of '67
- Political position: Left-wing to far-left (in constitutional terms)
- National affiliation: United Opposition (1904–1906)

The New Party (Hungarian: Új Párt) was a short-lived ultranationalist political party in the Kingdom of Hungary during the Dual Monarchy in the early 20th century. Founded and led by former Prime Minister Dezső Bánffy, the party combined radical Hungarian nationalism, chauvinism against ethnic minorities of Hungary and policies of state-enforced Magyarization with loyalty to the constitutional framework of the Austro-Hungarian Compromise of 1867 (the "'67er" platform).

As a member of the United Opposition, the party took part in the 1905 Hungarian parliamentary election, winning 13 seats in the House of Representatives before dissolving in March 1906.

== History ==
=== Background and foundation ===
Following his fall from power as Prime Minister of Hungary in February 1899, Dezső Bánffy resigned his parliamentary seat a week later, on 2 March 1899. Appointed to the prestigious court dignity of Master of the Court (Hungarian: főudvarmester), Bánffy temporarily stepped away from day-to-day party politics, though he remained active in public life as an ex officio member of the House of Magnates.

In March 1904, Bánffy resigned as Master of the Court in order to re-enter active political competition. Later that month, he established the New Party. Shortly thereafter, he secured a return to the House of Representatives by winning a parliamentary by-election in the first electoral district of Szeged.

=== Ideology and parliamentary opposition ===
Ideologically, the New Party reflected the views of Bánffy, who was contemporaneously known as the "most chauvinistic Hungarian". The party promoted radical nationalist objectives, advocating the aggressive Magyarization of non-Hungarian national minorities by any means and demanding a fundamental renegotiation of Hungary's economic and political relations with Austria. However, unlike other contemporary radical nationalist and Hungarian independence movements, the New Party distinguished itself by remaining committed to the constitutional framework of the Austro-Hungarian Compromise of 1867, operating on what was contemporarily termed the "'67er" basis. In Constitutional terms, this placed the party in the left-wing area of the Hungarian politics.

In addition to Bánffy, the party attracted prominent public intellectuals and politicians, notably the zoologist István Apáthy, who took a leading role in formulating and drafting the party's detailed platform, based on ethnic chauvinism, social Darwinism and staunch Habsburg loyalism.

Upon returning to parliament, Bánffy immediately clashed with Prime Minister István Tisza. Bánffy emerged as one of the fiercest and most vocal opponents of Tisza's proposed procedural reform (standing orders) designed to suppress parliamentary obstruction. On 18 November 1904, Tisza pushed the measure through in the controversial "handkerchief vote", triggering widespread political uproar. In response, several deputies defected from the governing Liberal Party to the New Party.

The following day, on 19 November 1904, the New Party formally joined the United Opposition. Bánffy and his fellow party member Károly Eötvös - a famed legal scholar and politician known for successfully defending the accused in the 1883 Tiszaeszlár affair - were both elected to the coalition's executive committee.

However, unlike other ultranationalist parties in Central and Eastern Europe, the New Party rejected antisemitism. While he was Prime Minister, Bánffy promoted the full religious equality of Judaism with the Christians religions within Hungary (Law XLII/1895), as he regarded the Jews as "Hungarians of Mozaic faith". Moreover, in a 1903 interview with a Jewish newspaper, he declared that "Those that are with us, are us".

=== 1905 election and stronghold ===
The 1905 Hungarian parliamentary election brought an unprecedented victory for the United Opposition, ending three decades of uninterrupted governance by the Liberal Party. The New Party won 13 seats in the House of Representatives (accounting for 3.15% of the assembly's seats), entering the parliamentary majority as part of the ruling coalition.

The party's primary political stronghold was in Transylvania, where more than half of its caucus was elected (mainly due to the Hungarian nobility's opposition to Romanian nationalism, represented by the Romanian National Party):

- Székelyudvarhely (now Odorheiu Secuiesc) – Zoltán Szakáts
- Székelykeresztúr (now Cristuru Secuiesc) – Endre Gyárfás
- Szamosújvár (Gherla) – László Dániel
- Kolozsvár (now Cluj-Napoca) – Miklós Wesselényi Jr. and Mór Pisztóry
- Sepsiszentgyörgy (now Sfântu Gheorghe) – István Bene
- Csíkszentmárton (now Sânmartin) – Ignác Bartha

The party's other elected deputies included Dezső Bánffy, Miklós Bánffy, Károly Eötvös, János Hock, Ferenc Óvári, and Kálmán Szabó.

New Party figures
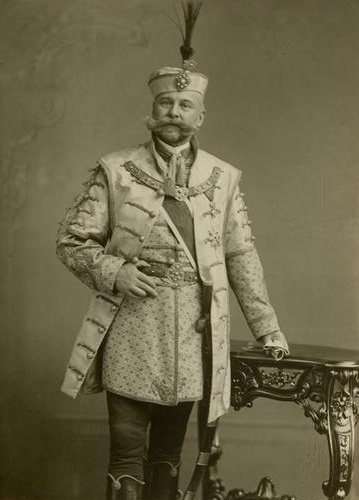
Dezső Bánffy

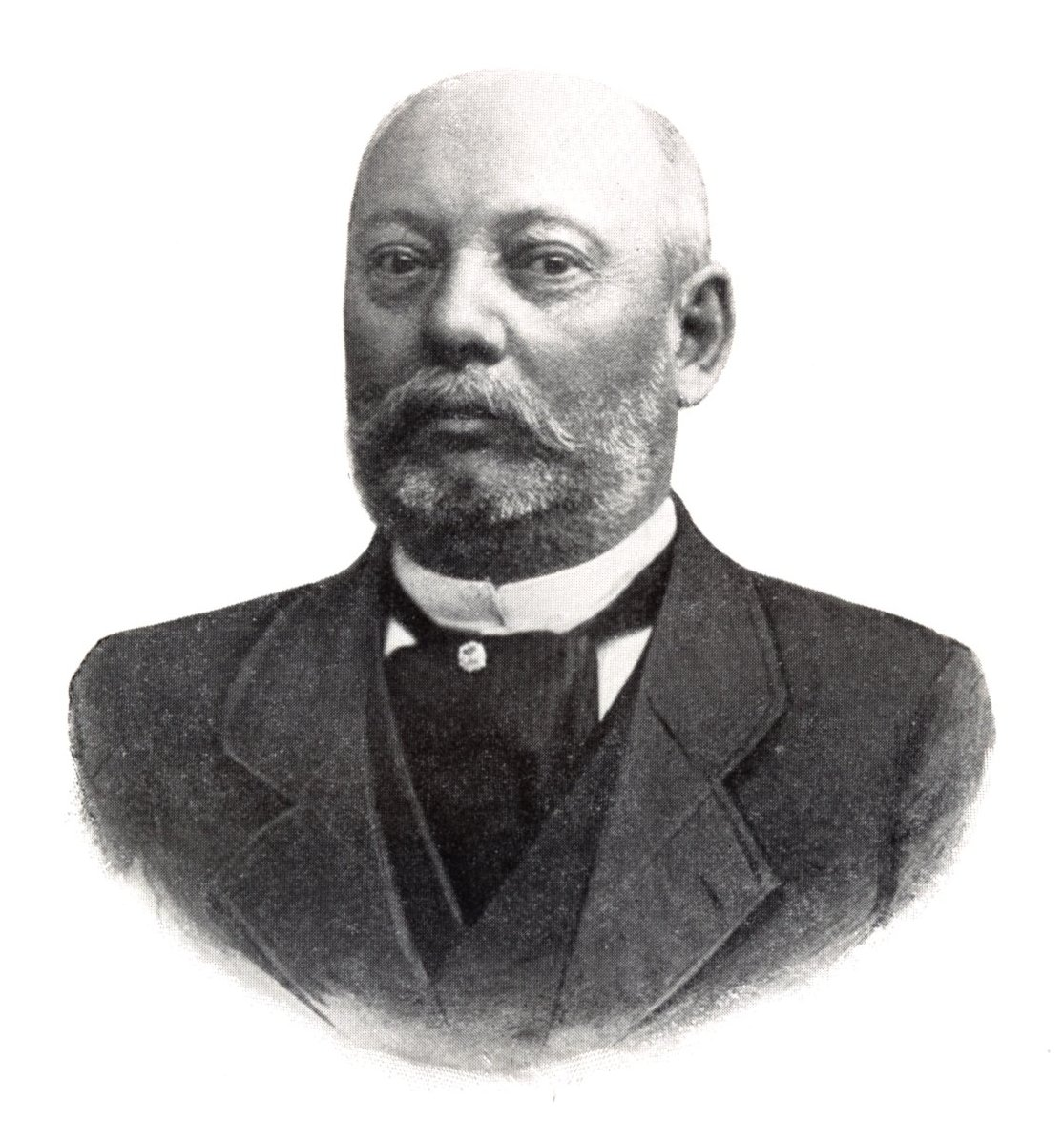
Károly Eötvös

János Hock

Ferenc Óvári

Mór Pisztóry

Miklós Wesselényi Jr.

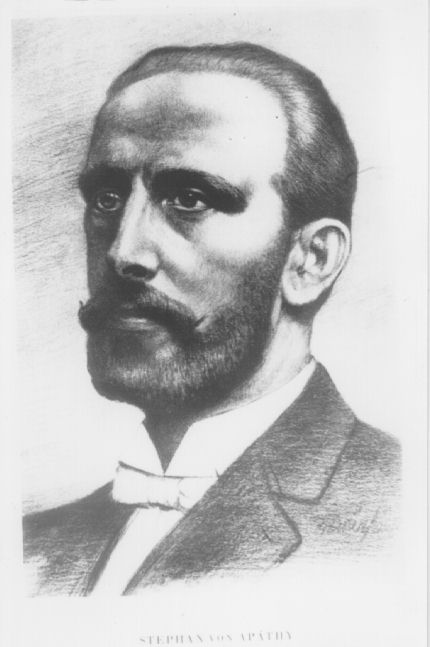
István Apáthy

=== Dissolution ===
During subsequent political campaigns and coalition debates, Bánffy advocated setting aside contentious military and army questions regarding the Austro-Hungarian Army, and to focus mainly of Magyarizing Hungary's non-Hungarian population. This stance brought him into sharp conflict with the other components of the United Opposition, which insisted on national military concessions.

In March 1906, the United Opposition formally expelled Bánffy from the alliance. Instead of following their leader into renewed political isolation, the members of the New Party chose to dissolve the party. Most of its former members subsequently joined the Party of Independence and '48, while others migrated to various other political groupings.

== Parliamentary election results ==
Election	Seats won	±	Share of seats	Status	Notes
1905	13 / 413	▲13	3.15%	In government	Part of the United Opposition

== Notable members ==
- István Apáthy – zoologist and political theorist
- Dezső Bánffy – former Prime Minister of Hungary, party founder and leader
- Miklós Bánffy – writer, politician, and later Minister of Foreign Affairs
- Károly Eötvös – jurist, writer, and politician
- János Hock – Catholic priest, writer, and politician
- Miklós Wesselényi Jr. – politician and member of the House of Magnates
