= Gasztony =

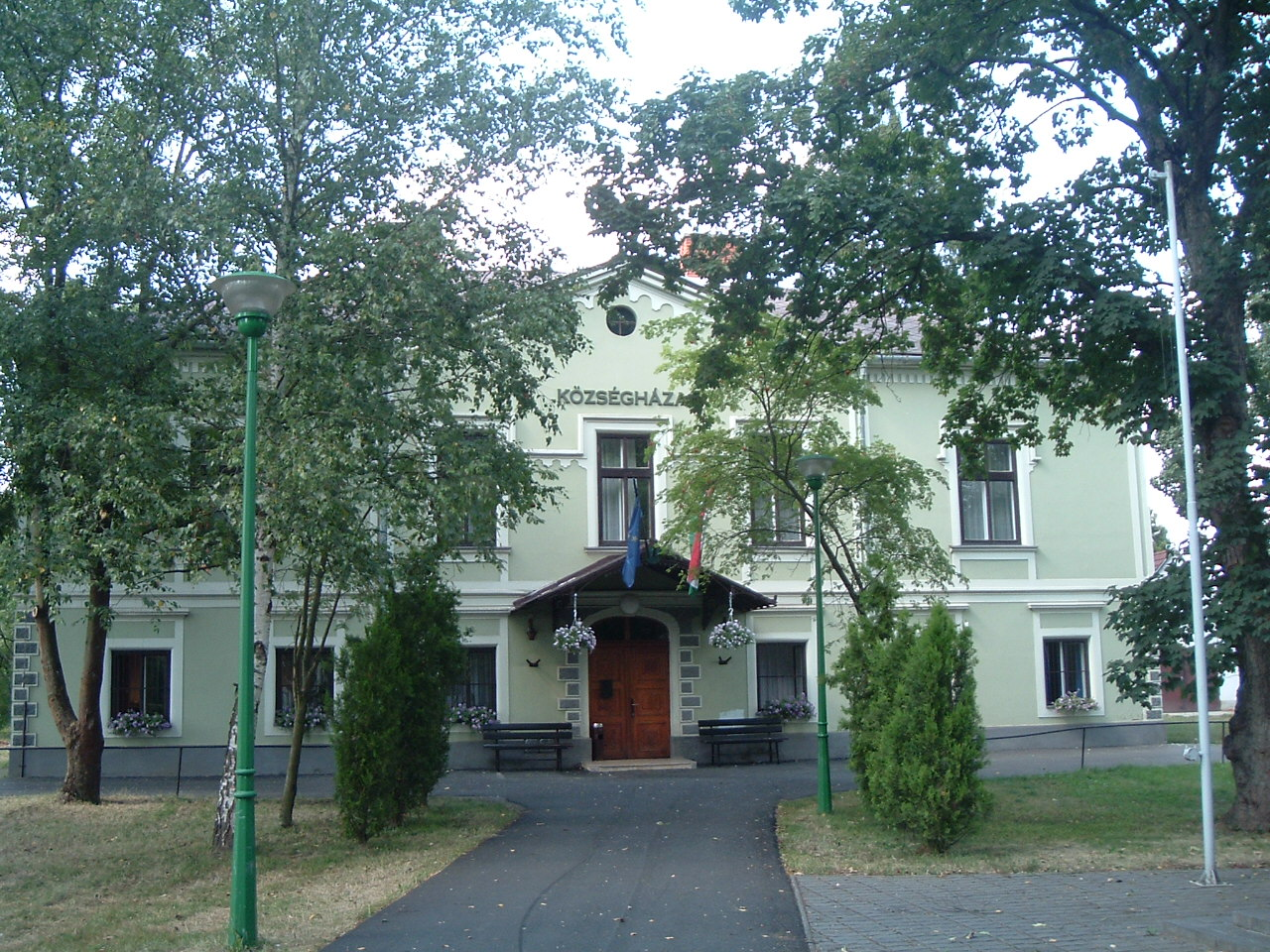
- Village hall

- Location of Vas county in Hungary

- Location of Gasztony
- Coordinates: 46.96495°N 16.45132°E
- Country: Hungary
- County: Vas

Area
  - Total: 14.27 km^{2} (5.51 sq mi)

Population (2004)
  - Total: 474
  - Density: 33.21/km^{2} (86.0/sq mi)
- Time zone: UTC+1 (CET)
  - Summer (DST): UTC+2 (CEST)
- Postal code: 9952
- Area code: 94

Gasztony is a village in Vas county, Hungary.

Kálmán Széll, a Hungarian politician, the Prime Minister of Hungary between 1899 and 1903 was born here.
