= Slovak National Party (historical) =

Political party in Austria-Hungary and Czechoslovakia, active 1871–1938

Slovak National Party Slovenská národná strana
- Abbreviation: SNS
- Founded: 1871
- Dissolved: 1938
- Merged into: HSĽS-SSNJ
- Headquarters: Turčiansky Svätý Martin Bratislava
- Ideology: Slovak nationalism National conservatism Autonomism; Internal factions: • Fascism • Agrarianism • Czechoslovakism • Political Catholicism
- Political position: Right-wing
- Colours: Blue

The Slovak National Party (Slovak: Slovenská národná strana, SNS) was a Slovak conservative and nationalist political party in the Kingdom of Hungary and then in Czechoslovakia from 1871 to 1938. The post-Velvet Revolution party with the same name sees the historical one as its ideological predecessor.

== SNS in Austria-Hungary ==
The Slovak National Party arose on 6 June 1871, as the first political party of Slovaks in history. It was the result of the decision of an already existing nationally oriented group (called the Old Slovak School) that wanted to take part in the elections to the Hungarian Diet (parliament). Their political program was based on the Memorandum of the Slovak nation, a political document from 1861 requiring the establishment of the so-called "Slovak surrounding" (Slovenské okolie), an intended form of Slovak autonomy. However, their first election was not successful – they received no mandates in the parliament.

In the year of another parliamentary election, 1878, SNS declared its passivity. That happened after the closing of all three Slovak secondary schools in the Kingdom of Hungary and of the Matica slovenská (Slovak Foundation), an important cultural organisation of the Slovaks, in 1874/1875. In 1881, the SNS did not receive any mandates in the parliament after unsuccessful elections.

In 1884 and 1887, the SNS declared its passivity in the general elections. In 1892 SNS did not take part in the elections, but supported the Slovak candidates of the Katolikus Néppárt (Catholic People's Party), mostly an ethnic Hungarian party. The first successful year from this point of view was 1901, when the SNS received four mandates in the Hungarian parliament. (That was after 30 years of SNS' existence). 1901 was also the year of the party's reorganisation. Since then, all Slovak political movements (the original members, the Catholic ľudáci and the liberal Hlasists) except the Social Democrats were included in the party. (While until then, the party was ruled only by a group called the Martin centre.)

In the 1905 elections, SNS received one mandate in the parliament. A very successful year for the Slovak candidates was 1906. That's when seven of them received mandates in the parliament of the Kingdom of Hungary. All of them were members of SNS, one of them being only a member of SNS, and six of them being also the members of Slovak People's Party, an autonomous part of SNS. In the 1910 elections, SNS received 3 parliamentary mandates.

On 28 June 1911, deputies of the party submitted a document called Memorandum of the SNS to the Hungarian government. In this document the SNS demanded the practical implementation of the so-called Nationalities Law from 1868 (the law declared all citizens of the Kingdom of Hungary members of a single Hungarian [in Hungarian "Magyar"] nation and Hungarian the only state language; the minor educational, administration and church rights for non-Hungarian nationalities stipulated in the law were never implemented), the permission to use the Slovak language in some types of schools at least and the returning of the property of the dissolved Matica slovenská. The Hungarian government rejected all of these demands. After this decision, the SNS started to co-operate more with representatives of Czech politics.

In 1913, the Slovak People's Party became officially independent from the SNS. In May 1914, representatives of all Slovak political movements except the Slovak People's Party agreed in Budapest to create the Slovak National Council. World War I, however, interrupted the implementation of this action temporarily. On 8 August 1914, the SNS stopped its activities and declared its loyalty to the Habsburg dynasty and monarchy to prevent any possible accusations of activities hostile to Austria-Hungary during the war.

On 24 May 1918, the SNS called a meeting of its executive committee. Politicians of other Slovak movements were also present. The SNS expressed here that its aim was the self-determination of the Slovak nation. Participants of the meeting agreed on creating a common state of Slovaks and Czechs. On 12 September, the Slovak National Council was created (unofficially). The official creation happened on 30 October 1918 during a meeting, called by the SNS, in the town of Turčiansky Svätý Martin (today Martin). The SNS chairman Matúš Dula became chairman of the council. This assembly of Slovak politicians also accepted the Declaration of the Slovak nation (also called Martin declaration), in which their will to politically join the Czech nation was expressed.

== SNS in Czechoslovakia ==
During the years of the first Czechoslovak Republic, the nationally oriented party was facing an ideology, which did not accept the existence of a Slovak nation, only a Slovak branch of one Czechoslovak nation – Czechoslovakism. The ideology was supported by a majority of the relevant Czechoslovak political parties and by the president, Tomáš Masaryk. SNS not only demanded an acceptation of the Slovak nation's existence, but also a political autonomy for Slovakia.

On 1 January 1919, the Matica slovenská was reopened. On 11 January 1920, the SNS merged with the Slovak Agrarians. The new name of the party was Slovak National and Farmers' Party (Slovenská národná a roľnícka strana). The National Assembly elections in April 1920 brought the party 242,045 votes, which made it the second strongest party in Slovakia (after the Czechoslovak Social Democrats). In 1922, the Agrarians left the party and merged with the Czech Agrarians into the Republican Party of Farmers and Peasants. The nationalist wing returned to its original name Slovak National Party.

In 1922, the SNS demanded cultural and administrative autonomy in the Memorandum of the SNS. In the 1925 general elections, the party received 35 432 votes and no mandates in the National Assembly. In another election year, 1929, the party participated in the elections as a member of a multi-ethnic coalition of parties (Czechoslovak National Democracy, SNS and an ethnic Rusyn Russophile block), which received 359 547 votes and 15 mandates. Only one mandate belonged to the SNS. On 16 October 1932, leaders of the SNS and the Hlinka's Slovak People's Party Martin Rázus and Andrej Hlinka accepted the Zvolen manifesto, in which they rejected Czechoslovakism. Here they formed an alliance of their parties called the Autonomy Block. A group of SNS members (e.g. M. Daxner, Ján Paulíny-Tóth) didn't agree with this coalition. Until the election in 1935, other political parties also joined the Block. The Autonomy Block succeeded in the parliamentary election: receiving 30.12% of the Slovak votes, it became the winner of the elections in Slovakia.

Slovak autonomy was established in 1938. On 6 October, Hlinka's Slovak People's Party declared it in the Žilina Manifesto. This step was supported also by other parties (including the SNS) on the same day in the Žilina Treaty and then accepted by the government in Prague. On 7 October, the first autonomous Slovak government (led by Jozef Tiso) was named.

The SNS merged with Hlinka's Slovak People's Party – Party of the Slovak National Unity on 15 December 1938 and received no autonomous position in this party. This step was forced by the People's Party and supported only by a group of members around Miloš Vančo. Other members showed their disapproval during the meeting of the executive committee on 23 November 1938. However, after further talks with the People's Party, as well as the official stopping of the SNS's activities (by a government body), made the further existence of the party impossible.

== Prominent members ==
- Viliam Pauliny-Tóth (first chairman in the history of the SNS)
- Pavol Mudroň (chairman)
- Svetozár Hurban-Vajanský
- Ján Francisci
- Martin Čulen
- Štefan Marko Daxner
- Matúš Dula (chairman)
- Jozef Gregor Tajovský (writer, secretary of the SNS)
- Milan Hodža (party leader, later Czechoslovak Prime Minister representing the Czechoslovak Agrarian party)
- Emil Stodola (chairman)
- Martin Rázus (chairman, poet, MP in the Czechoslovak parliament)
- Ján Paulíny-Tóth (chairman)
