= 1910 Hungarian parliamentary election =

- 1–10 June 1910

All 413 elected seats in the Diet 207 seats needed for a majority
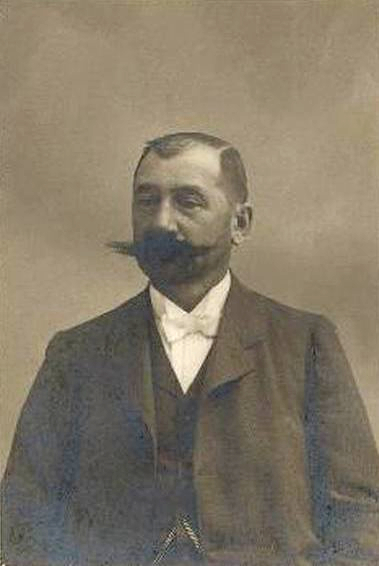

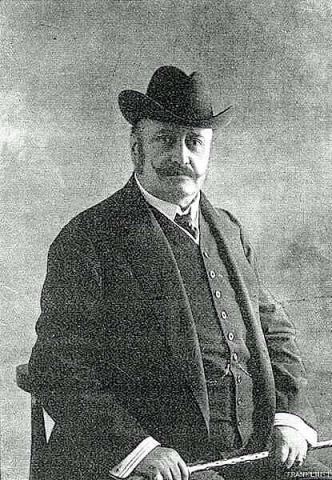

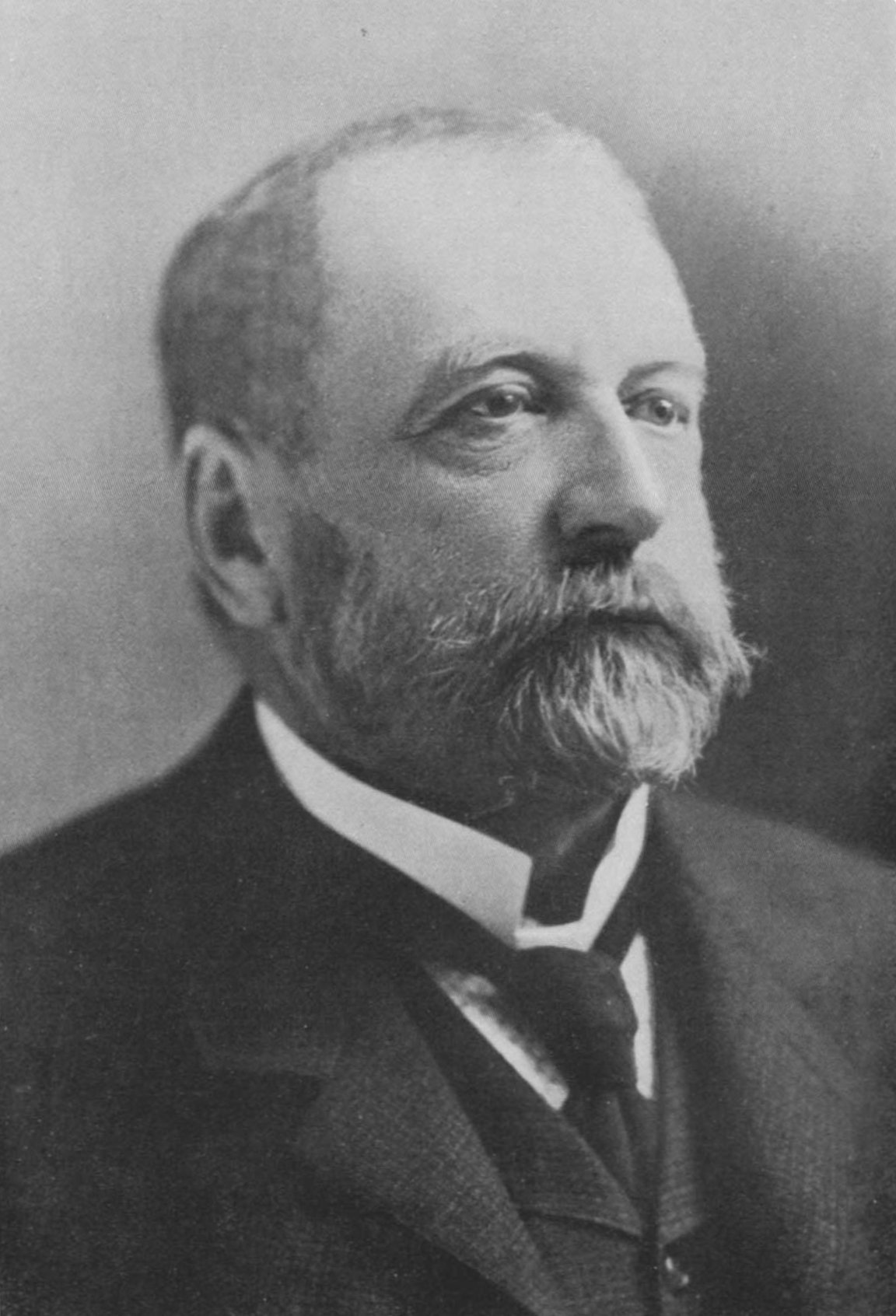
| | First party | Second party | Third party |
|---|---|---|---|
| Leader | László Lukács | Ferenc Kossuth | Gyula Justh |
| Party | NMP | 48FKP | F48JP |
| Seats won | 256 / 413 | 51 / 413 | 44 / 413 |
| Seat change | New | ▼196 | New |
| Percentage | 61.99% | 12.35% | 10.66% |
Prime Minister before election
Károly Khuen-Héderváry
NMP
Prime Minister after election
Károly Khuen-Héderváry
NMP

Parliamentary elections were held in Hungary between 1 and 10 June 1910. The result was a victory for the National Party of Work, which won 256 of the 413 seats. They were the last elections in Hungary as part of Austria-Hungary. The split between the Party of Independence and '48 triggered a coalition crisis in November 1909. The extension of the patent of the Austro-Hungarian Bank was supported by the group led by Ferenc Kossuth and Count Albert Apponyi, while the group led by Gyula Justh opposed it. In the elections, they ran separately as an independence and liberal party under the name of the Justh Party of Independence and '48 and a conservative party under the name of the Independence Kossuth Party of '48. István Szabó founded the National Independence Farmer Party for '48, which demanded land reform, tax reform, administrative and electoral reform, and equal rights for nationalities. The Hungarian Independent Socialist Peasant Party led by András Áchim launched similar demands. The king dismissed the prime minister in January 1910, and members of the defunct National Constitution Party and the former Liberal Party founded the National Party of Work in February, which supported the government. The government provided financial support for the victory of the government party without parliamentary representation. The new Parliament convened on June 23, 1910.

== Parties and leaders ==
| Party | Leader |
|---|---|
| National Party of Work (NMP) | László Lukács |
| Independence Kossuth Party of '48 (48FKP) | Ferenc Kossuth |
| Justh Party of Independence and '48 (F48JP) | Gyula Justh |
| Catholic People's Party (KNP) | Aladár Zichy |
| Romanian National Party (RNP) | Gheorghe Pop |
| National Independence Farmer Party for '48 (48FOGP) | István Szabó |
| Slovak National Party (SNP) | Pavel Blaho |
| Civic Democratic Party (PDP) | Vilmos Vázsonyi |
| Hungarian Independent Socialist Peasant Party (MFSZPP) | András Áchim |
| National Christian Socialist Party (OKSZP) | Sándor Giesswein |

== Electoral system ==
The elections were based on property, income and education census. Landowners with a ¼ plot of land, rural industrialists paying a tax of 6 Ft, urban industrialists paying a tax of 10.50 Ft, house tenants paying a tax of 15.75 Ft, land and house owners paying a tax of 5 Ft, landless house owners paying a tax of 6 Ft, employed priests, officials, teachers, tutors, writers, artists, lawyers, notaries and health workers with a degree were electors. 20 years older men were eligible to vote and 24 years older men could be elected. Women had no right for the participation. The elections were held exclusively in single-member district by open voting.

== Results ==
| Party | Seats | +/– |
|---|---|---|
| National Party of Work | 256 | New |
| Independence Kossuth Party of '48 | 54 | -196 |
| Justh Party of Independence and '48 | 44 | New |
| Independent '67ers | 19 | +17 |
| Catholic People's Party | 13 | -21 |
| Independent '48ers | 10 | New |
| Romanian National Party | 5 | -9 |
| National Independence Farmer Party for '48 | 4 | New |
| Slovak National Party | 3 | -4 |
| Civic Democratic Party | 2 | -1 |
| Hungarian Independent Socialist Peasant Party | 1 | 0 |
| National Christian Socialist Party | 1 | New |
| Independent moderate | 1 | -21 |
| Total | 413 | – |
Source: Ballabás-Pap-Pál

The group of independents are classified by their political position as 48'ers, 67'ers and moderate opposition.

== Aftermath ==
After the elections, conflicts of interest between the parliament and the monarch over the reform of the army resurfaced. The prime minister did not take a clear stand on either side, which led to his downfall, and he was replaced by László Lukács. After the assassination of András Áchim, his party ceased to exist in 1911. After Count István Tisza was elected Speaker of the House in 1912, by violating the House Rules and breaking the opposition obstruction, he forced to pass the law on the reform of the armed forces. Representative Gyula Kovács attempted to shoot down the Speaker and then attempted to suicide. The marks of the shots can still be seen in the session hall.
