= Manó Széchényi =

Hungarian politician

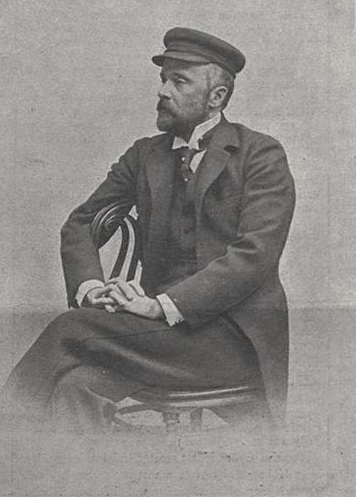

Minister besides the King of Hungary
- In office 20 December 1898 – 7 March 1900
- Preceded by: Dezső Bánffy
- Succeeded by: Kálmán Széll

Personal details
- Born: 30 July 1858 Sopron, Kingdom of Hungary
- Died: 29 December 1926 (aged 68) Sennyefa, Kingdom of Hungary
- Party: Liberal Party
- Profession: politician, diplomat

Count Manó Széchényi de Sárvár-Felsővidék (30 July 1858 – 29 December 1926) was a Hungarian politician, who served as Minister besides the King between 1898 and 1900. During his career he was an ambassador to the German Empire, Kingdom of Greece and the Italian Kingdom. He was a member of the Sovereign Military Order of Malta. He had a big role in the peace conferencies about the Greco-Turkish War, for which one he got an Order of Leopold. He also worked in Russia, Saint Petersburg.

Széchényi's wife was Countess Maria Theresia Revertera von Salandra from 1907. They had no children. However Mano fathered a child, Vera, with Isabella Waldberg with whom he had a long-term relationship.

Political offices
Preceded by Dezső Bánffy	Minister besides the King; 1898–1900	Succeeded by Kálmán Széll
