= Catholic People's Party (Austria-Hungary) =

Political party in Austro-Hungary (1895–1907)

The Catholic People's Party was the name of two conservative parties active concurrently in the two components of the Austria-Hungary dual monarchy.

== Austrian Party ==
The Austrian Catholic People's Party (German: Katholische Volkspartei [kaˈtoːlɪʃɛ ˌfɔlksparˈtaɪ]) was formed in 1895, following a split in the Conservative Hohenwart-Klub . Its leaders were Alfred Ebenhoch and Josef von Dipauli.

Membership in the party, representing Ultramontane and Conservative positions, was not limited to one nationality. The Catholic People's Party brought together Germans, Poles and Czechs, united by their Catholic faith and the political conclusions drawn from it, in the Elections of 1897. In the Reichsrat elections of 1901 it lost 4 out of 27 seats.

It joined the Christian Social Party in 1907.

== Hungarian Party ==
The Hungarian Catholic People's Party (Hungarian: Katolikus Néppárt [ˈkɒtolikuʃ ˈneːpːaːrt]) was at the initiative of Ottokár Prohászka, Count Nándor Zichy and Count Miklós Móric Esterházy on November 14, 1894 (according to another source, on January 28, 1895). The impetus for its creation was given by the legal reforms of the 1890s aimed at a Separation of Church and State, most notably the introduction of Civil Marriage - to which the party's founders were strongly opposed.

During its existence, the party ran in five elections (1896, 1901, 1905, 1906, and 1910). It joined the Opposition Bloc which achieved a historic victory in the 1905 elections, unseating the Liberal Party which had been in power since the Compromise of 1867 and triggering a severe domestic political crisis. As a member of the Coalition, which was confirmed in power in the 1906 elections, the People's Party was represented in the Second Wekerle Cabinet by Aladár Zichy.

By 1910, the Coalition had disintegrated and the independent Catholic People's Party had once again been pushed into opposition. Due to the outbreak of World War I in 1914, no new elections were held until 1920.

The Catholic People's Party, led by Aladár Zichy (who had been its president since 1903), merged with the National Christian Socialist Party on February 3, 1918, with the strong support of the National Christian Socialist Association, to form the Christian Social People's Party. The latter was dissolved and banned during the time of the Soviet Republic of Hungary. It was re-established in 1920, under the name of the Christian National Association Party.

Several newspapers were at different times affiliated with or operated by The Catholic People's Party: The Hungarian State (1868-1908), the Constitution (1895-1919), the People's Party (1899-1909) and the People's Newspaper (1910–44).

During its existence, the party had three presidents; the founder was Nándor Zichy (1894-?), János Zichy (? -1903) and finally Aladár Zichy (1903-1918). Among the prominent members of the People's Party, József Farkas from Zala County, who not only worked diligently with Count Nándor Zichy, but also was elected to parliament four times, representing the party.

Other prominent members and supporters of the party included Flórián Strausz de Strauszenbergh, Papal Prelate and Bishop of Alsólendva; István Rakovszky de Nagyrákó and Nagyselmec; Ödön Beniczky of Benice and Micsinye; Miklós Zboray de Zboró; and György Szmrecsányi de Szmrecsány. An enthusiastic and militant member of the People's Party was Dr. Ferenc Major, chief medical officer of Székesfehérvár, who represented the party alongside Károly Kálmán, parish priest of Sóskút. Ferenc Darányi, a lawyer and politician, first stood in 1896 as a candidate with a People's Party program in the Szentlőrinc district, but failed to get elected. In 1901 and later, he was elected at the Zalabaksa district of Zala County.

Zala County was one of the strongholds of the Catholic People's Party, where the party often held rallies there: on May 31, 1896, the People's Party held a major rally in the fairgrounds in Zalaegerszeg.

Count Aladár Zichy was elected representative in Nagykanizsa in 1896, and from there he represented the district with the program of the People's Party, of which he was elected president in 1903, after the resignation of Count János Zichy.

Parliamentary election results:

Elections	Seats	Ratio	Role
1896	18	4,36%	opposition
1901	25	6,05%	opposition
1905	25	6,05%	government^{1}
1906	33	7,99%	government^{1}
1910	13	3,14%	opposition

^{1}: As part of the "Allied opposition"
