= 1892 Hungarian parliamentary election =

- 29 January–3 February 1892

All 413 seats in the Diet 207 seats needed for a majority
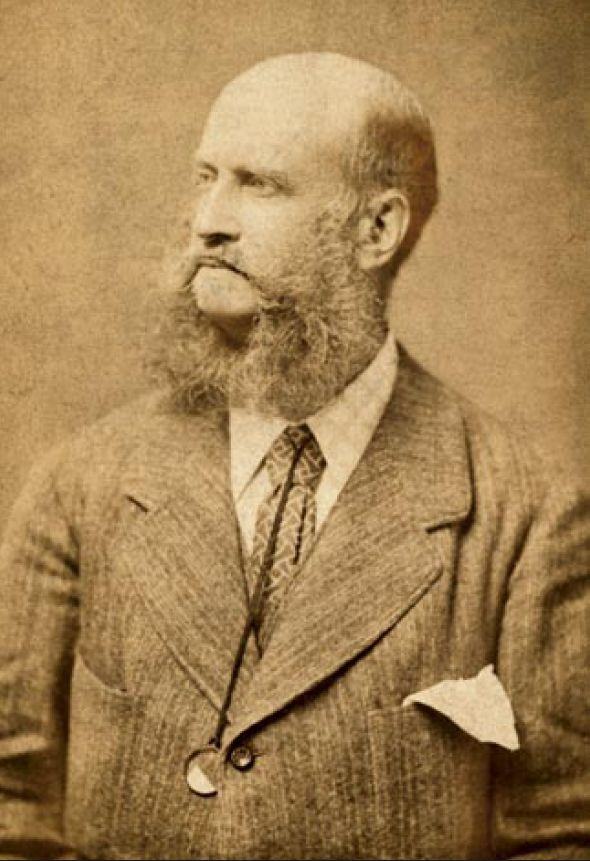

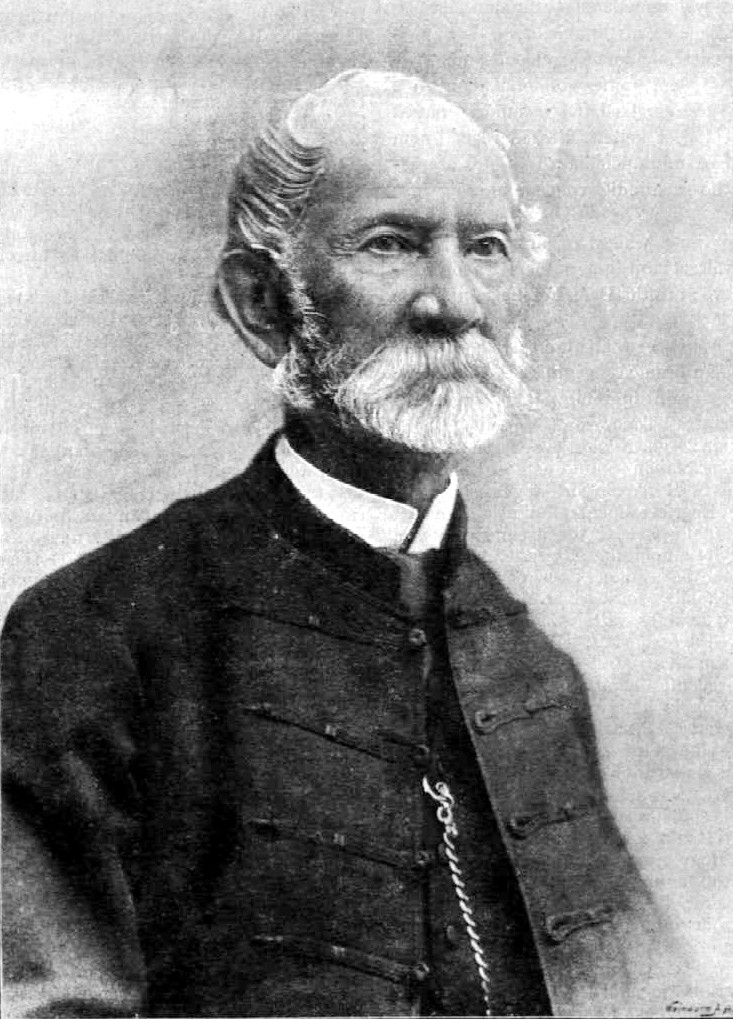

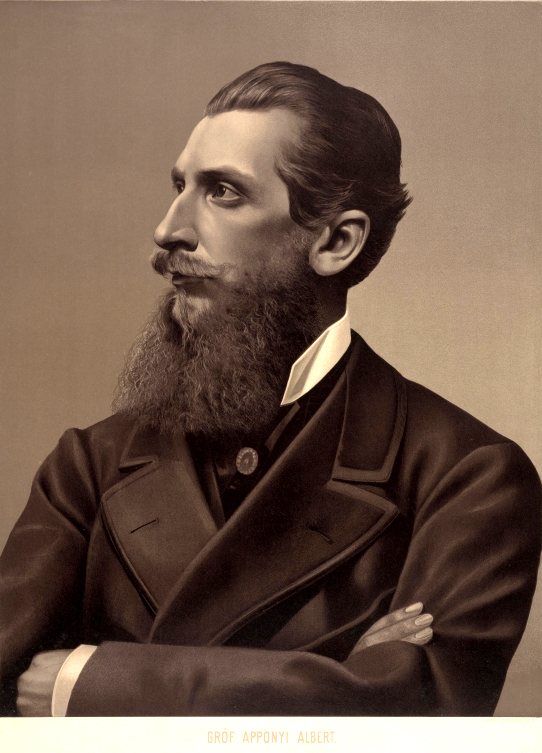
| | First party | Second party | Third party |
|---|---|---|---|
| Leader | Frigyes Podmaniczky | Dániel Irányi | Albert Apponyi |
| Party | SZP | 48FP | NP |
| Seats won | 245 / 413 | 87 / 413 | 62 / 413 |
| Seat change | ▼11 | ▲8 | ▲15 |
| Percentage | 59.32% | 21.07% | 15.01% |
Prime Minister before election
Gyula Szapáry
SZP
Prime Minister after election
Gyula Szapáry
SZP

Parliamentary elections were held in Hungary between 29 January and 3 February 1892. The period before the elections was characterized by social discontent. Although the government led by Count Gyula Szapáry reacted to the formation of the Social Democratic Party and introduced health insurance for industrial workers, they took violent action against the agrarian socialist movements. The uprising of the poorest in the counties of Békés, Csongrád and Csanád was crushed by the gendarmerie in 1891. The agrarian socialists demanded progressive taxation, suffrage and the abolition of feudal services that had remained despite the emancipation of serfs. The Romanians of Transylvania wrote a memorandum to the ruler in 1892, in which they expressed their cultural and administrative grievances. Franz Joseph I refused to receive them and sent the memorandum to the Hungarian government. The authors of the memorandum were convicted by a court for incitement through the press. Before the elections, the conservative Moderate Opposition rebranded as National Party under the leadership of Count Albert Apponyi. The National Antisemitic Party is dissolved before the election. The group led by Gábor Ugron left the '48ers Party of Independence and create a new party, because they disagreed with the radicalizing leadership. The new parliament convened on February 20, 1892.

== Parties and leaders ==
| Party | Leader |
|---|---|
| Liberal Party (SZP) | Frigyes Podmaniczky |
| '48ers Party of Independence (48FP) | Dániel Irányi |
| National Party (NP) | Albert Apponyi |
| '48ers Ugron Party (48UP) | Gábor Ugron |

== Electoral system ==
The elections were based on property, income and education census. Landowners with a ¼ plot of land, rural industrialists paying a tax of 6 Ft, urban industrialists paying a tax of 10.50 Ft, house tenants paying a tax of 15.75 Ft, land and house owners paying a tax of 5 Ft, landless house owners paying a tax of 6 Ft, employed priests, officials, teachers, tutors, writers, artists, lawyers, notaries and health workers with a degree were electors. 20 years older men were eligible to vote and 24 years older men could be elected. Women had no right for the participation. The elections were held exclusively in single-member district by open voting.

== Results ==
| Party | Seats | +/– |
|---|---|---|
| Liberal Party | 245 | -11 |
| '48ers Party of Independence | 87 | +8 |
| National Party | 62 | +15 |
| '48ers Ugron Party | 14 | New |
| Independent moderate | 4 | -9 |
| Independent '67ers | 1 | -6 |
| Total | 413 | – |
Source: Ballabás-Pap-Pál

The group of independents are classified by their political position as 67'ers and moderate opposition.

== Aftermath ==
After the elections, the government's relationship with the Catholic Church deteriorated due to the proposal of church-political reforms, which led to the resignation of the prime minister in November. The new government remained intolerant with ethical minority movements, and in 1894 the Romanian National Party was banned. They next won a seat in a by-election in 1903.
