= National Party of Work =

Political party in the Kingdom of Hungary

National Party of Work Nemzeti Munkapárt
- Historical leaders: László Lukács; István Tisza
- Founder: Károly Khuen-Héderváry; István Tisza; László Lukács; Albert Berzeviczy
- Founded: 19 February 1910
- Dissolved: 22 October 1918
- Headquarters: Budapest, Kingdom of Hungary
- Newspaper: Az Újság
- Ideology: Ideology of '67; Liberalism

The National Party of Work (Hungarian: Nemzeti Munkapárt) was a liberal political party in Hungary between 1910 and the end of World War I. The party was established by István Tisza after the defeat of the Liberal Party in the 1905 and 1906 elections. The party was led by László Lukács, who served as Prime Minister from 1912 to 1913. As its predecessor the Liberal Party, the new party also remained bitterly unpopular among ethnic Hungarian voters, and could rely mostly on the support of ethnic minority voters.

== History ==
After the Liberal Party lost the 1905 elections, István Tisza established the National Party of Work, hoping a new party would revitalise his former party; the Liberal Party had often been mocked as the "Imperialist Party", referencing support for the Austro-Hungarian Compromise and the political interests of the Habsburg Emperor and the economic interests of the Austrian half of the Empire. With the new name "National" Tisza wanted to emphasise that the party was focussed on the interests of the Hungarian part of the empire. The other word "Work" was inserted into the name of the new party because the chief point of its manifesto was to "declare war" on the unemployment via special programme for the private enterprises and companies.

The party won an absolute majority in the 1910 elections, and governed until the end of World War I, with Tisza remaining in control of the party for the duration of its existence. In 1913, as a result of increasing internal tensions (especially the heavy-handed methods of Tisza), several former members of the National Constitution Party under the leadership of Gyula Andrássy Jr. seceded and reestablished their former party, going into opposition. However the National Party of Work retained its majority in Parliament. Owing to the supermajority held by the party in Parliament, Tisza was the de facto leader of the Hungarian political life between 1910 and 1918, even in the periods when he did not hold any posts in the government.

After Tisza's resignation, on 15 June 1917, the Esterházy government was formed with the involvement of almost all parliamentary parties in order to create political stability. As the National Party of Work still had an absolute parliamentary majority, the fall of the newly appointed government was virtually certain, even though it had a minister from National Party of Work ) which it did in August, barely two months after its formation. The third Wekerle government formed after them, learning from the previous case, tried to create a new government party under the name of the 48th Constitution Party under the leadership of Sándor Wekerle, in order to achieve political stability. The National Party of Work was merged into the new government party on 22 October 1918, but this did not lead to the desired result either, because István Tisza (thus the majority of the MEPs) did not support their political program. The Hadik government, appointed after Wekerle's resignation on 30 October 1918, could not be formed; it was swept away by the Aster Revolution that very evening. Tisza did not support the Hadik government either, however he was assassinated by communist soldiers on 31 October 1918, which was the first event of the Aster Revolution. After the death of Tisza, the party disbanded itself, and its representatives supported their former political opponent, Mihály Károlyi, and his new Hungarian National Council.

== Election results ==
=== National Assembly ===
Election	Leader	Votes	%	Seats	Rank	Status
1910	László Lukács		61.98	256 / 413	1st	Government
