= Reorganized Social Democratic Party of Hungary =

The Reorganized Social Democratic Party of Hungary (Hungarian: Magyarországi Újjászervezett Szociáldemokrata Párt) was a political party in Hungary. It was founded in 1900 by Vilmos Mezőfi. Mezőfi, a journalist by profession, had been expelled from the Social Democratic Party of Hungary for being outspoken on agrarian issues. Mezőfi's party advocated land reforms, and forced sales of large estates of land.
