= Emil Stodola =

Slovak politician and lawyer

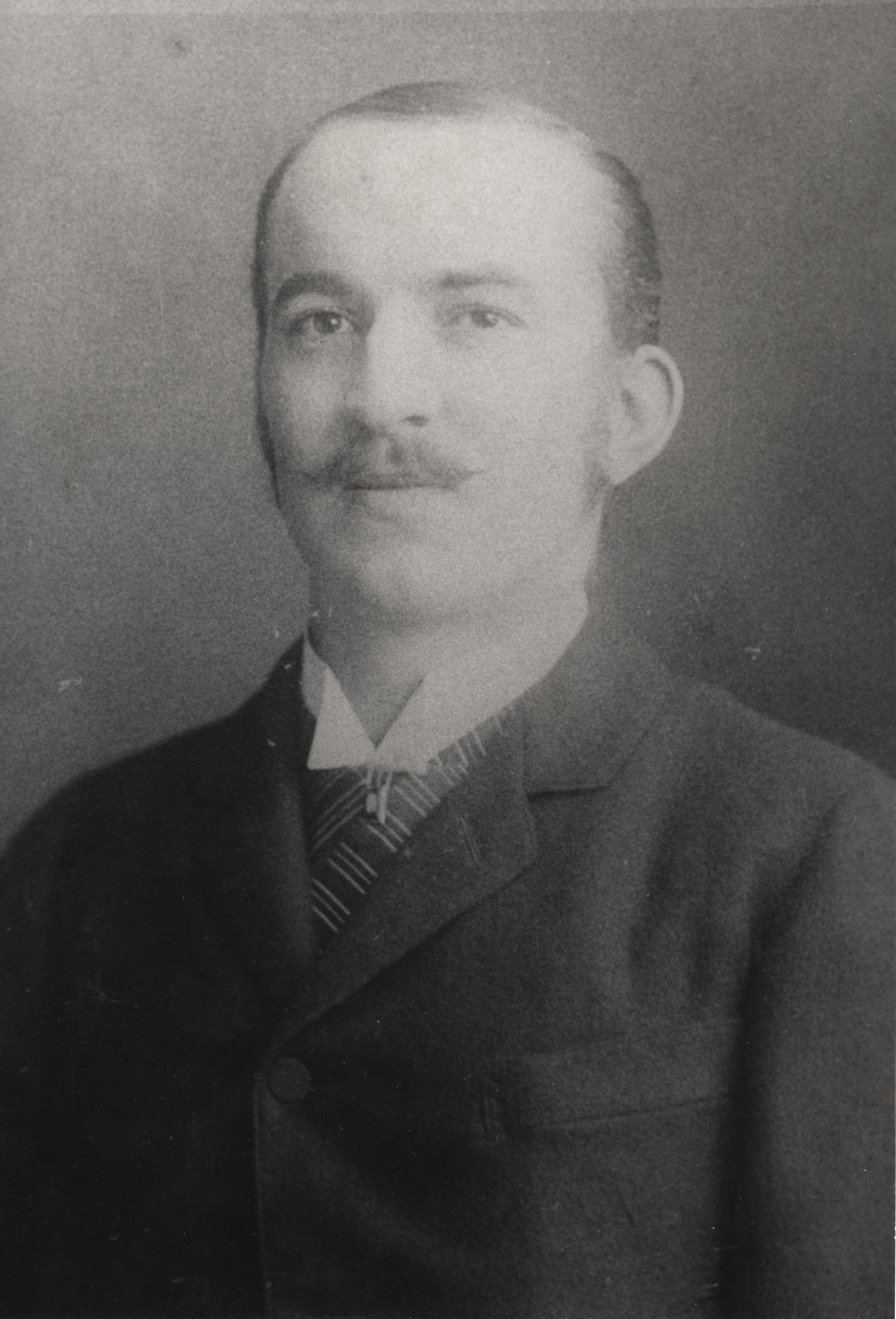
- Born: March 22, 1862; Liptovský Mikuláš
- Died: June 28, 1945 (aged 83); Bratislava

Emil Stodola (1862-1945) was a Slovak politician and lawyer. He was founder of the journal Pravny obzor (Law Review), and served as its editor-in-chief.
