= Dezső Bánffy =

Hungarian politician (1843–1911)

Baron Dezső Bánffy de Losoncz
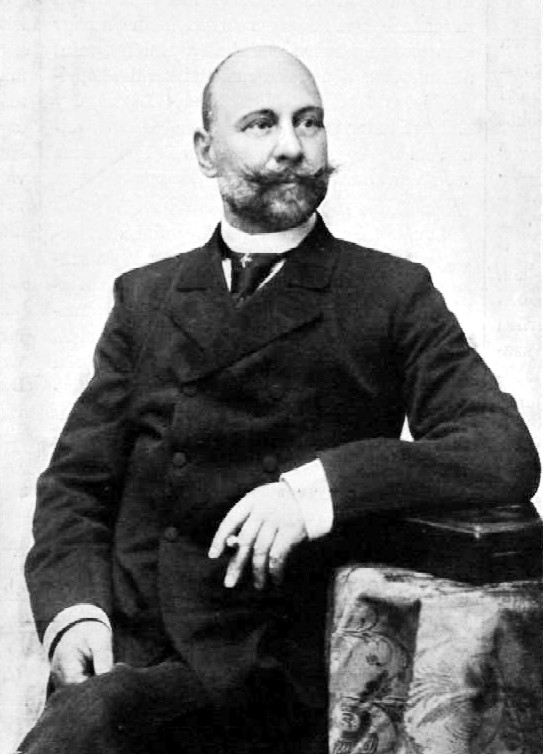

Prime Minister of the Kingdom of Hungary
- In office 14 January 1895 – 26 February 1899
- Monarch: Francis Joseph I
- Preceded by: Sándor Wekerle
- Succeeded by: Kálmán Széll

Personal details
- Born: 28 October 1843 Kolozsvár, Kingdom of Hungary, Austrian Empire (today Cluj-Napoca, Romania)
- Died: 24 May 1911 (aged 67) Budapest, Austria-Hungary
- Party: New Party (Hungary)
- Other political affiliations: Liberal Party
- Spouse(s): Mária Kemény de Magyargyerőmonostor (1844–1884); Ilona Máthé de Nagyenyed (1862–1911)
- Children: Kazimir, Hedvig, Ferenc, Alice, Teodóra

Baron Dezső Bánffy de Losonc (English: Desiderius Bánffy; 28 October 1843 – 24 May 1911) was a Hungarian politician who served as Prime Minister of Hungary from 1895 to 1899.

== Biography ==
Born into the old Hungarian House of Bánffy, Dezső Bánffy was the son of Baron Dániel Bánffy de Losoncz (1812–1886) and his wife, Anna Gyárfás de Léczfalva (1821–1902). He was born in Kolozsvár, Hungary (now Cluj-Napoca, Romania) on 28 October 1843, and educated at the Berlin and Leipzig universities.

As lord lieutenant of the county of Belső-Szolnok, chief captain of Kővár and curator of the Reformed Church of Transylvania, Bánffy exercised considerable political influence outside parliament from 1875 onwards, but his public career may be said to have begun in 1892, when he became speaker of the house of deputies. As speaker he continued, however, to be a party-man (he had always been a member of the left-centre or government party) and materially assisted the government by his rulings. He was a stringent adversary of the radicals, and caused some sensation by absenting himself from the capital on the occasion of Lajos Kossuth's funeral on 1 April 1894.

On 14 January 1895, the king, after the fall of the Kálmán Széll ministry, entrusted him with the formation of a cabinet. His programme, in brief, was the carrying through of the church reform laws with all due regard to clerical susceptibilities, and the maintenance of the Composition of 1867, whilst fully guaranteeing the predominance of Hungary. He succeeded in carrying the remaining ecclesiastical bills through the Upper House, despite the vehement opposition of the papal nuncio Antonio Agliardi, a triumph which brought about the fall of Gustav Kálnoky, the minister for foreign affairs, but greatly strengthened the ministry in Hungary. In the ensuing elections of 1896 the government won a gigantic majority. The drastic electoral methods of Bánffy had, however, contributed somewhat to this result, and the corrupt practices were the pretext for the fierce opposition in the House which he henceforth had to encounter, though the measures which he now introduced (the Honvéd Officers' Schools Bill) would, in normal circumstances, have been received with general enthusiasm.

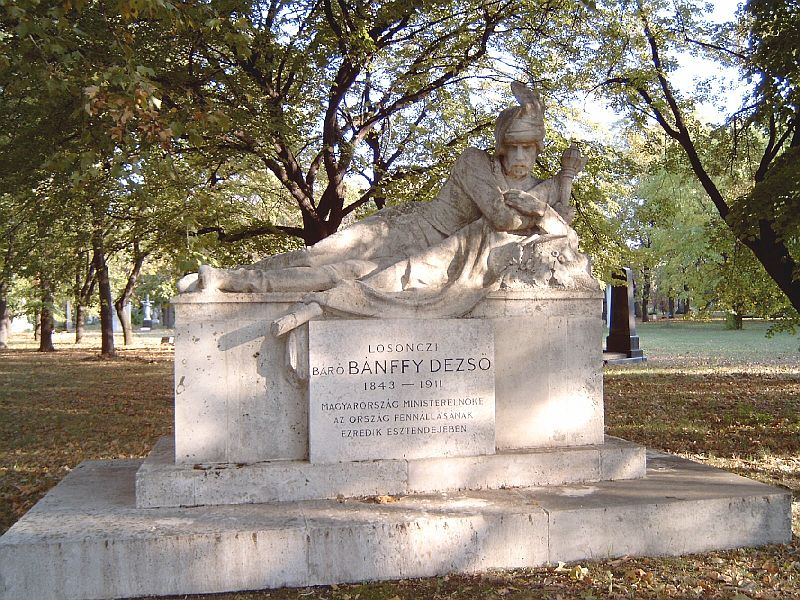
Tomb at the Kerepesi Cemetery

Bánffy's resoluteness enabled him to weather all these storms, and his subsequent negotiations with Austria as to the quota and commercial treaties, to the considerable political advantage of Hungary, even enabled him for a time to live at peace with the opposition. But in 1898 the opposition, now animated by personal hatred, took advantage of the ever-increasing difficulties of the government in the negotiations with Austria, and refused to pass the budget till a definite understanding had been arrived at. They refused to be satisfied with anything short of the dismissal of Bánffy, and passion ran so high that on 3 January 1899 Bánffy fought a duel with his most bitter opponent, Horánszky.

On 26 February Bánffy resigned, to save the country from its "ex-lex," or unconstitutional situation; he was decorated by the king and received the freedom of the city of Buda. Subsequently, he contributed to overthrow the István Tisza administration, and in May 1905 joined the Ferenc Kossuth ministry.

In 1906 Bánffy broke with the coalition on the military questions at issue with the king, which he wished to eliminate, and in 1908 he became leader of the progressive elements and, as president of the Franchise League, began an agitation for universal, secret, and equal suffrage. In 1910 he became president of the Reform Club.

== Notes ==
Political offices
Preceded by Tamás Péchy	Speaker of the House of Representatives; 1892–1895	Succeeded by Dezső Szilágyi
Preceded by Sándor Wekerle	Prime Minister of Hungary; 1895–1899	Succeeded by Kálmán Széll
Preceded by Sámuel Jósika	Minister besides the King; Acting; 1898	Succeeded by Manó Széchényi
