= Party of Independence and '48 =

Party of Independence and '48 Függetlenségi és 48-as Párt
- First leader: Dániel Irányi
- Last leader: Vince Nagy
- Founded: 1884
- Dissolved: 13 April 1945
- Merger of: Independence Party (FP) and Party of 1848 (1848P)
- Merged into: Independent Smallholders' Party (FKGP)
- Headquarters: Budapest, Hungary
- Ideology: Ideology of '48; Classical radicalism
- Political position: Left-wing
- Colours: Dark red

The Party of Independence and '48 (Hungarian: Függetlenségi és 48-as Párt; F48P), also known mostly by its shortened form Independence Party (Hungarian: Függetlenségi Párt), was one of the two major political parties in the Kingdom of Hungary within Austria-Hungary, along with the Liberal Party and then the National Party of Work. During its existence, the F48P strongly opposed the Austro-Hungarian Compromise of 1867. The party was revived after the fall of the Hungarian Soviet Republic and restoration of the monarchy.

== History ==
The Party of Independence and '48 was established in 1884 by a merger of the Independence Party and the Party of 1848. Lajos Kossuth was its spiritual leader until he died in 1894, and the party was also referred to as the "Kossuth Party" thereafter. From the 1896 elections onwards, it was the main opposition to the ruling Liberal Party. It won the 1905 and 1906 elections, but it lost the 1910 elections to the National Party of Work.

By this time the party was beginning to split into factions. Ferenc Kossuth and Albert Apponyi led a right-wing grouping that supported an alliance with Germany, whilst Gyula Justh and later Mihály Károlyi led a left-wing faction that opposed working with Germany. In 1916 the party split when Károlyi left to establish the United Party of Independence and '48, with Károlyi becoming prime minister in 1918. Following World War I, the party was severely weakened. It failed to win a seat in the 1920 elections. It ran in the 1922 elections as the Independence and '48 Kossuth Party, winning one seat, which it retained in the 1926 elections.

By 1931 the party had adopted its final name, the National Independence Kossuth Party (Hungarian: Országos Függetlenségi és Kossuth Párt). The elections that year saw it lose its single seat. In the 1935 elections it won a single seat, running on a joint list with the National Radical Party in one multi-member constituency. The party did not contest the 1939 elections, and was dissolved on 13 April 1945 when it merged into the Independent Smallholders, Agrarian Workers and Civic Party.

== Election results ==
Election	Votes	%	Seats	+/–	Status
1884			75 / 413	–	Opposition
1887			78 / 413	▲3	Opposition
1892			86 / 413	▲8	Opposition
1896			50 / 413	▼36	Opposition
1901			79 / 413	▲29	Opposition
1905			165 / 413	▲86	Opposition
1906			253 / 413	▲88	In government
1910			51 / 413	▼202	Opposition
1920	14,928	1.3% (#6)	0 / 219	▼51	Extra-parliamentary
1922	33,220	2.03% (#9)	1 / 245	▲1	Opposition
1926	13,564	1.17% (#8)	1 / 245	Steady	Opposition
1931	28,518	1.89% (#7)	0 / 245	▼1	Extra-parliamentary
1935 (Note: Joint list in one multi-member constituency with the National Radical Party)	5,648	0.29%	1 / 245	▲1	Opposition
