= Kálmán Széll =

Hungarian politician (1843–1915)

Noble Kálmán Széll de Duka et Szentgyörgyvölgy
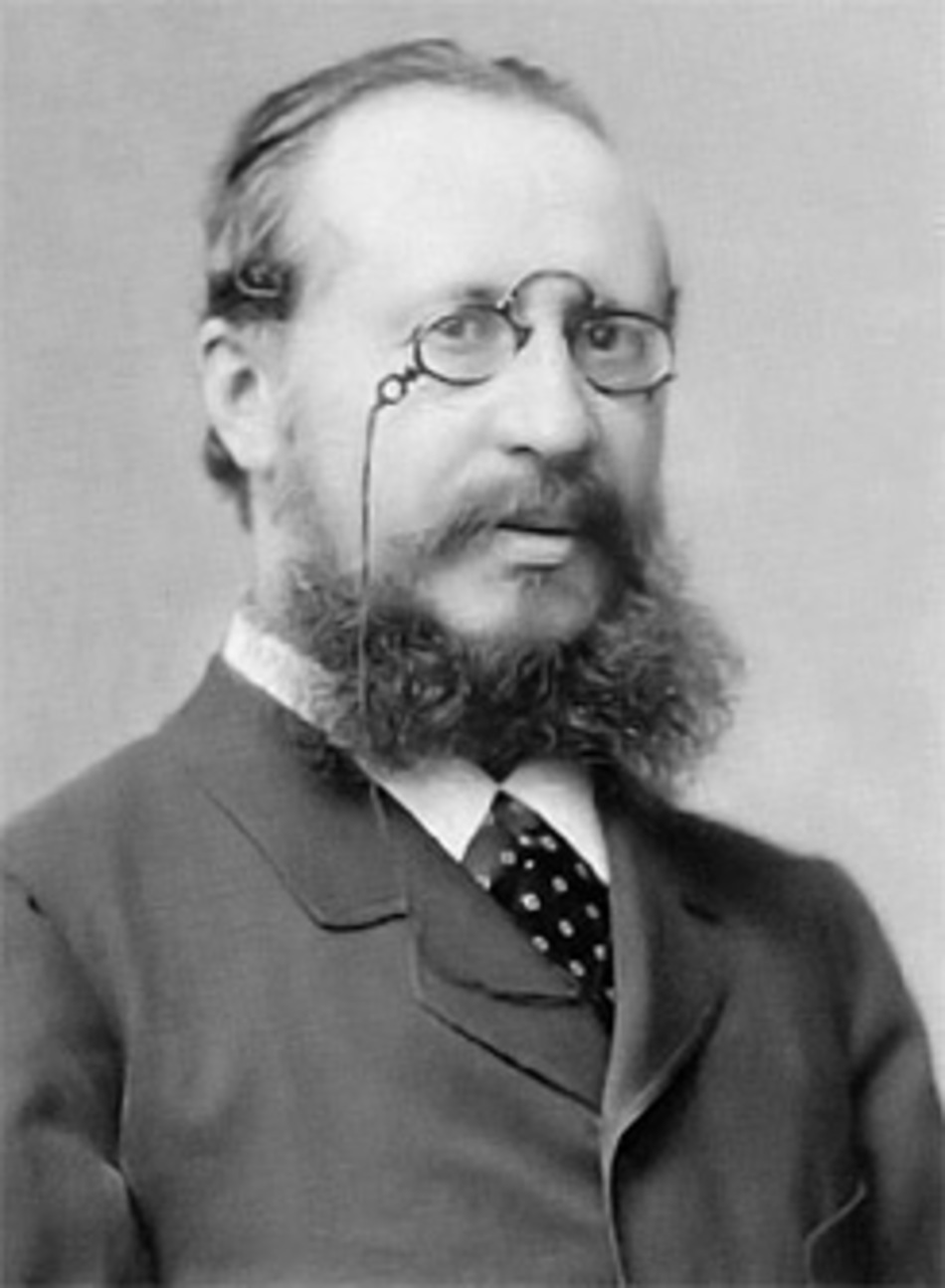

Prime Minister of the Kingdom of Hungary
- In office 26 February 1899 – 27 June 1903
- Monarch: Francis Joseph I
- Preceded by: Dezső Bánffy
- Succeeded by: Károly Khuen-Héderváry

Personal details
- Born: 8 June 1843 Gasztony, Hungary, Austrian Empire
- Died: 16 August 1915 (aged 72) Rátót, Hungary, Austria-Hungary
- Spouse: Ilona Vörösmarty
- Children: 1 (Ilona)

Kálmán Széll de Duka et Szentgyörgyvölgy (8 June 1843 – 16 August 1915) was a Hungarian politician who served as Prime Minister of Hungary from 1899 to 1903.

== Early career ==
He was born in the ancient Hungarian noble family Széll de Duka et Szentgyörgyvölgy, that originally hailed from Vas County, in the western region of the Kingdom of Hungary. His father was József Széll (1801–1871), ispán-regent of Vas County, and his mother was a noblewoman, Júlia Bertha de Felsőőr (1817–1873).

Among his Hungarian noble ancestors were his maternal grandfather, Ignác Bertha de Felsőeőr (1780–1847), vice-ispán of Vas County, jurist, landowner, and his maternal great-grandfather, József Sümeghy de Lovász et Szentmargitha (1757–1832), royal counselor, jurist, landowner, and vice-ispán of Zala County.

He studied in Pest and Vienna, and in 1867 became deputy for the district of Szentgotthárd. He quickly garnered the reputation of being remarkably well informed on economic and financial questions. Széll was one of Ferenc Deák's confidants, whose ward, the daughter of the Hungarian poet Mihály Vörösmarty, he married.

In 1875, he was finance minister in the cabinet of Kálmán Tisza, and as such imposed on himself the task of restoring the shattered credit of Hungary. In 1878, he concluded with Austria the first economic "balancing" (German: Ausgleich).

At that time, the Austrian National Bank was changed, in conformity with this arrangement, into the Austro-Hungarian Bank, and Széll consolidated the Hungarian Rentes, and nearly succeeded in balancing the state finances. As he feared that this balance would again be upset by the occupation of Bosnia and Herzegovina, he resigned from the cabinet, incurring thereby the displeasure of the crown. He still kept his seat in parliament, and as deputy constantly criticized the financial policy of the Tisza cabinet.

At the beginning of the 1880s Széll founded the Hungarian Mortgage Credit Bank, of which he was governor until the end of his life. He opened entirely new sources of credit for Hungarian agriculture. He declined repeated offers of the portfolio of finance.

== Prime minister ==
When Dezső Bánffy's ministry suffered a serious crisis at the end of 1898 and was compelled to resign in February 1899, Széll was entrusted with the formation of a new cabinet. By means of the Pact of 23 February 1899, he restored parliamentary peace. On the basis of the so-called Széll formula, a new Ausgleich with Austria until the year 1907 was concluded after long negotiations. The most important result of this was that Hungary attained the status of an independent customs area, but, under the arrangement for reciprocity, still maintained intact the existing conditions of the Customs Union with Austria.

In 1901, under Széll's Ministry, the new elections resulted in a Liberal victory, and Prime Minister Széll formed a government. A year later began the struggle for the reform of the national defense, and Széll introduced in 1902 a law for increasing the number of recruits, in exchange for which the Independent Party — under the slogan of "no more soldiers without the introduction of Hungarian as the language service and command" — wanted concessions to the principle of nationality.

The obstruction against the provision for defense lasted from the end of January to 4 April 1903, and resulted in the suspension of the constitution ("Ex lex" condition). Széll sought to wear down the opposition by delay. As part of the majority would not agree to this, he resigned on 16 June 1903.

== Party leader ==
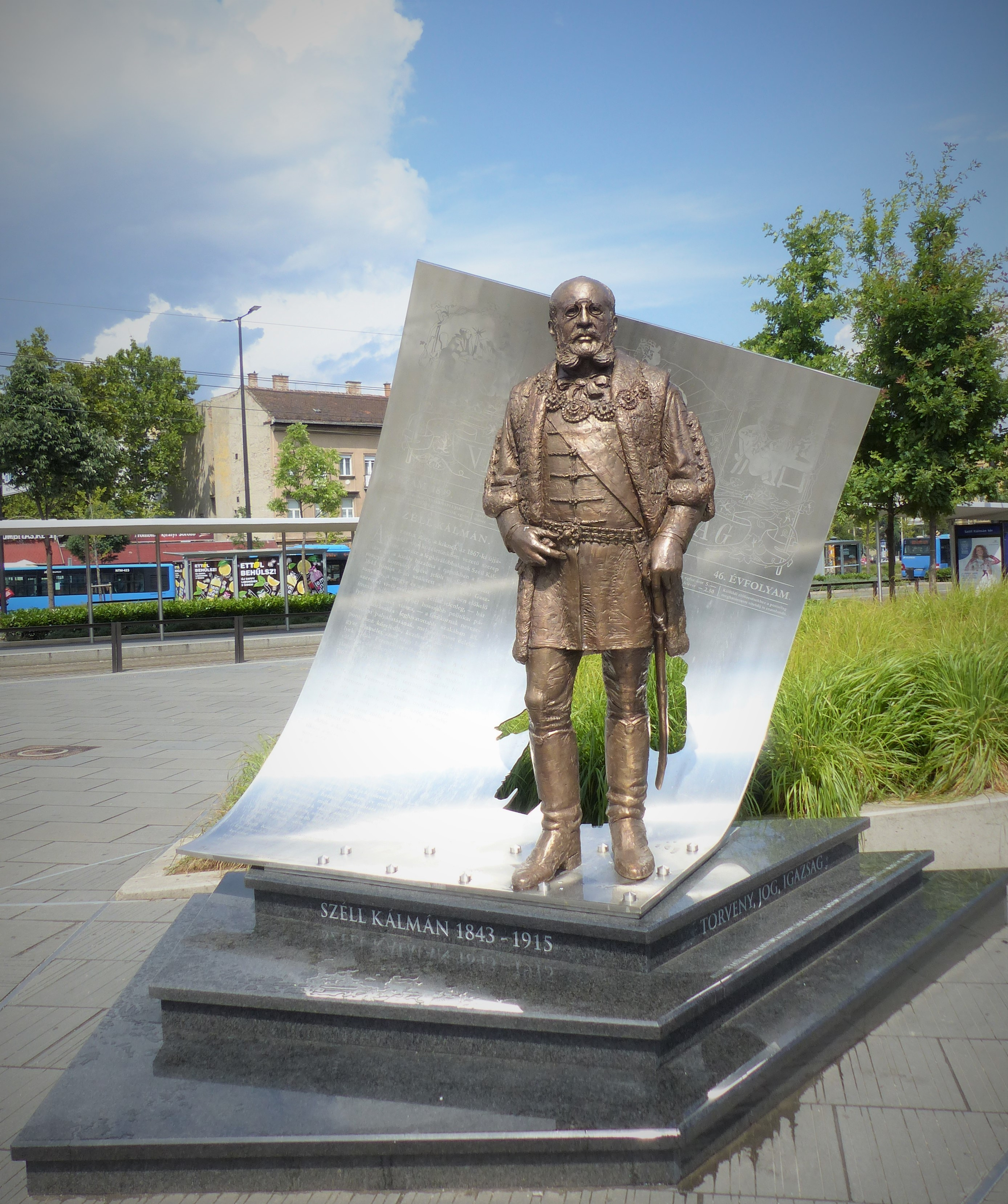
His statue at Széll Kálmán square

When his successor, István Tisza, on 18 November 1904, brought about a split in the Liberal party by forcing through parliament new rules of procedure, Széll joined Gyula Andrássy in the secession from the party. Under the coalition cabinet of Sándor Wekerle, Széll was chosen chairman of the Constitution Party. He tried continually, but in vain, to bridge the opposition between Tisza and Andrássy.

== Family ==
Széll married Ilona Vörösmarty, daughter of poet Mihály Vörösmarty on 16 September 1867. They had a daughter, named Ilona. His niece Marianne Csáky-Széll married Czech violinist Jan Kubelík.

== Notes ==
Political offices
Preceded by Kálmán Ghyczy	Minister of Finance; 1875–1878	Succeeded by Kálmán Tisza
Preceded by Dezső Bánffy	Prime Minister of Hungary; 1899–1903	Succeeded by Károly Khuen-Héderváry
Preceded by Dezső Perczel	Minister of the Interior; 1899–1903	Succeeded by Károly Khuen-Héderváry
Preceded by Manó Széchényi	Minister besides the King; Acting; 1900	Succeeded by Gyula Széchényi
Party political offices
Preceded by Gyula Andrássy the Younger	Chairman of the Constitution Party; 1906–1910	Succeeded by János Hadik
