= Ferenc Kossuth =

Hungarian civil engineer and politician

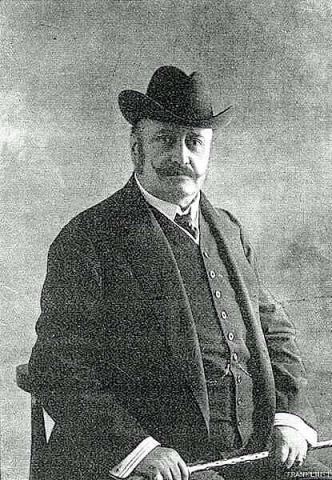
- Kossuth, c. 1900

Minister of Trade of Hungary
- In office 8 April 1906 – 17 January 1910
- Preceded by: László Vörös
- Succeeded by: Károly Hieronymi

Personal details
- Born: 16 November 1841 Pest, Kingdom of Hungary
- Died: 25 May 1914 (aged 72) Budapest, Austria-Hungary
- Political party: Party of Independence and '48
- Spouse(s): Emily Hoggins (m. 1876; died 1887) Mária Kvassay de Brassó et Brogyán (died 1914)
- Profession: engineer, politician

Ferenc Lajos Ákos Kossuth de Udvard et Kossuthfalva (16 November 1841 – 25 May 1914) was a Hungarian civil engineer and politician.

== Early life ==
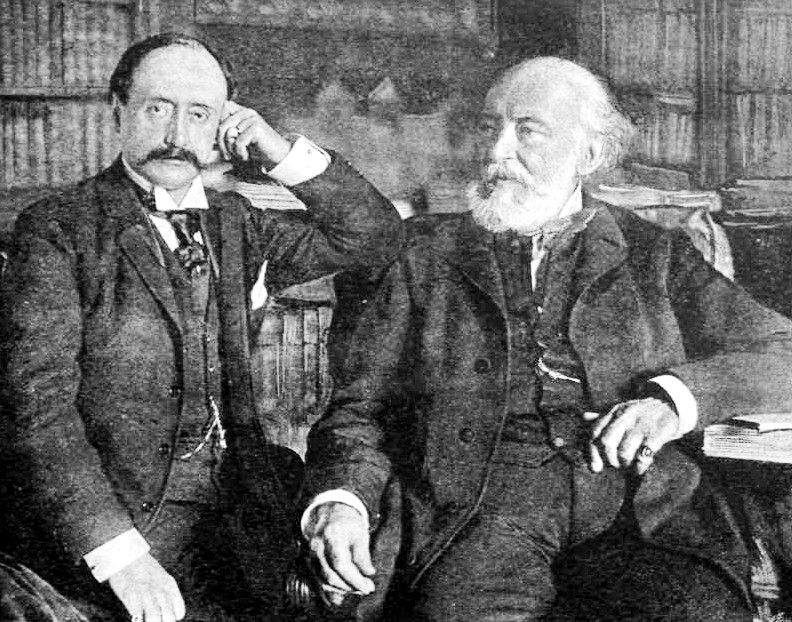
Ferenc (left) and Lajos Kossuth (right) in 1892

Kossuth was born on 16 November 1841 in Pest, Kingdom of Hungary. He was the son of Hungarian revolutionary Lajos Kossuth.

Ferenc was educated at the Paris Polytechnic and the London University, where in 1859 he won a prize for political economy.

== Career ==
After working as a civil engineer on the Forest of Dean Central Railway, he went to Italy in 1861, where he resided for the next 33 years, taking a considerable part in the railway construction of the peninsula, including the Fréjus rail tunnel, and at the same time keeping alive the Hungarian independence question by a whole series of pamphlets and newspaper articles.

In 1885, he was decorated for his services by the Italian government. His last great engineering work was the construction of the steel bridges for the Nile. In 1894, he escorted his father's remains to Hungary, and the following year resolved to settle in his native land and took the oath of allegiance.

=== Political career ===
As early as 1867, he had been twice elected a member of the Hungarian diet, but on both occasions refused to accept the mandate. On 10 April 1895, he was returned for Tapolca and in 1896 for Cegléd, and from that time took an active part in Hungarian politics. In the autumn of 1898 he became the leader of the obstructionists or "Independence Party", against the successive Dezső Bánffy, Kálmán Széll, Károly Khuen-Héderváry and István Tisza administrations (1898–1904), exercising great influence not only in parliament but upon the public at large through his articles in the Egyetértés.

The elections of 1905 having sent his party back with a large majority, he was received in audience by the king and helped to construct the Sándor Wekerle ministry, in which he was Minister of Commerce. In his cabinet role, Kossuth had many opportunities of turning to account his technical and economic experience. At the critical period of the Coalition, he showed throughout solid ability, in contrast to Gyula Justh, who in 1909 brought about the break-up of the Independence Party, which split into the Kossuth and the Justh wings.

In consequence of increasing ill-health, Kossuth withdrew more and more from active politics, and only appeared in Parliament on special occasions. When in the summer of 1913 the two wings of the Independence Party were again united, Count Mihály Károlyi undertook their actual leadership. In articles published in the Budapest, Kossuth continued to express his views. He made his last appearance in Parliament on 30 October 1913. From his bed of sickness, to which he was confined from the autumn of 1913 onwards, he declined any participation with Károlyi against the Triple Alliance policy of the dual monarchy.

== Personal life ==
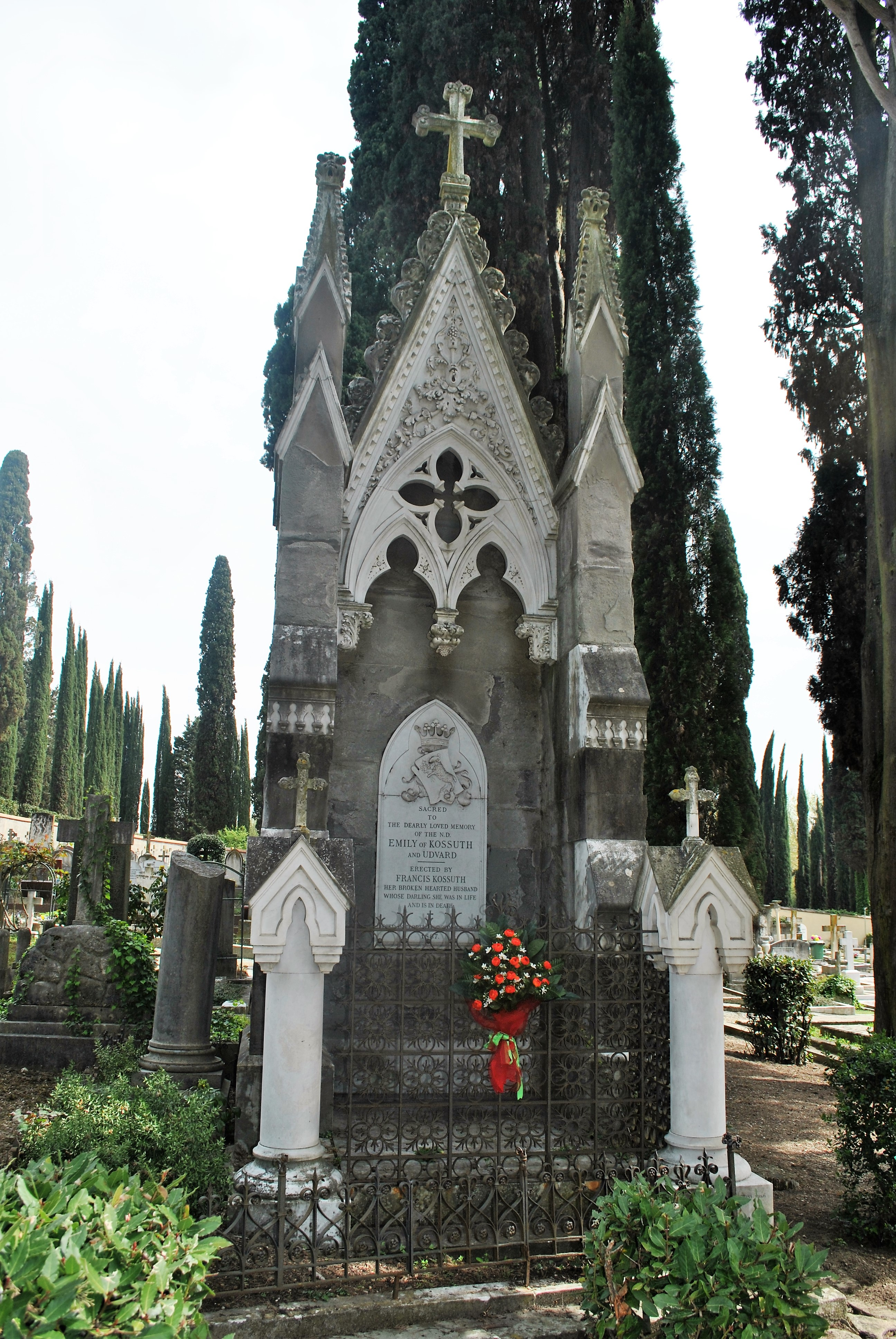
Cimitero degli Allori, Emily Hoggins Kossuth

In 1876 at Cesena, Ferenc married Emily Hoggins. She died in 1887 and is buried at Cimitero degli Allori, Florence. The monument reads: "Sacred to the dearly loved memory of the n.d. Emily of Kossuth and Udvard, erected by Francis Kossuth, her broken-hearted husband whose darling, she was in life and is in death."

After her death, he married Mária Kvassay de Brassó et Brogyán, with whom he remained married until his death, in Budapest, on 25 May 1914.
