= Pejačević family =

Croatian noble family

Pejačević / Pejácsevich
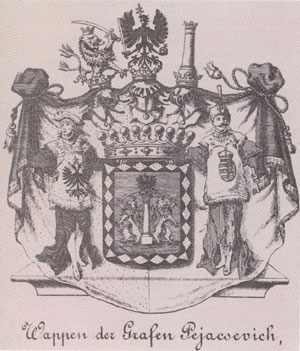
- Parent family: Parčević
- Country: Republic of Ragusa
- Founded: 14th century
- Founder: Dmitar Pejačević
- Titles: Baron (1712); Count of Virovitica (1772)
- Connected families: Virovitica (extinct); Ruma-Retfala (extinct); Našice (present)

The House of Pejačević or Pejácsevich (Note: Croatian: Pejačevići, Hungarian: Pejácsevich or Pejácsevics, Serbian Cyrillic: Пејачевићи, Bulgarian: Пеячевичи) (Note: In German and Spanish, the family name was sometimes rendered Pejacsevich, i.e. a simplified variant of the Hungarian spelling.) is an old Croatian noble family, remarkable during the period in history marked by the Ottoman war in the Kingdom of Croatia and Austro-Hungarian Empire respectively. Notable members of the family were politicians, clerics, artists, senior military officers, Bans (viceroys) of Croatia and other high state officials. They were very potent and influential in the political, social, economic and cultural life of the country, and especially distinguished in the region of Slavonia.

== Family origin ==
The origin of the family dates back to the 14th-century territory of southeastern Croatia and the neighbouring medieval Bosnia and Herzegovina. There are sources that connect the ancestors of the family with the Bosnian king Stjepan Dabiša (English: Stephen Dabisha), who ruled from 1391 to 1395, and his son Parčija (English: Parchia). Parčija's descendants used to be called Parčević (Parchevich). One of several family branches that came out of them later (in the 16th century) was the Pejačević family.

The 59th volume of the "Archive for the Austrian History" issued by the Imperial Academy of Sciences in Vienna in 1880 includes a long chapter about Baron Petar Parčević (1612–1674), the archbishop of Marcianople, a town in eastern Bulgaria. The text of that chapter is based on the researches made by Count Julijan Pejačević (1833–1906), a chronicler of the family. Despite the doubts of some historians, later analyses mostly showed and confirmed that he had a history-based approach and his theses had been proven. This refers particularly to the research of Bulgarian historiography, including those conducted by Bojan Penev and Boris Jocov in the 1920s and 1930s. The research dealt with the connected families of Parčević and Pejačević (as well as some other related families) during their residence in the territory of today's Bulgaria (then occupied by the Ottoman Empire). Particular facts have been described in Encyclopedia Bulgaria (1981-1997) (Енциклопедия България), issued in Sofia, in detail.

== Bulgarian period ==
The Parčević family settled in the second half of the 14th century in Bulgaria. Encyclopedia Bulgaria specifies that Parčija arrived there with his family along with Ragusan merchants. The reason for that migration has not been determined with certainty, but it was most probably caused by disputes and conflicts among the noblemen in southeastern Croatia and Bosnia, where Parčija had his estates.

Having lived the first years in Veliko Tarnovo (until 1399), the Parčević family moved to the west of the country and settled in a little town named Chiprovtsi. This is why some historians believe that the Pejačević family originated from there. At that time Chiprovtsi was a mining and metalsmithing centre, developed by German (Transylvanian Saxon) miners, who arrived in 13th and 14th century. Ragusan merchants and Bosnian Franciscan priests came there as well. They were all Roman Catholics, and a mixture of nationalities and religions was created in Chiprovtsi at that time. The Ottomans, who conquered that region soon after that, made this ethnic mixture even more various.

The branches of Parchevich family lived not only in Chiprovtsi, but also in the neighboring villages, even founding some new ones, like Kneže (Knezhe), Pejakovo or Pejačevo (Pe'yachevo) and Čerka (Cherka). Some of the branches of the family later took the names of these places, creating family names like Knežević, Pejačević and Čerkić.

=== Genealogy of the first family members ===
- Parčija, mentioned in 1386.

- Nikola I Parčević, son of Parčija
- Andrija I Parčević, son of Parčija

- Petar I Parčević, son of Andrija I, died after 1423.

- Nikola II Parčević, son of Petar I, mentioned between 1437 and 1470.

- Gjoni Parčević, son of Nikola II, mentioned in 1481, had sons:

- Ivan I Parčević, mentioned in 1563
- Stjepan Knežević
- Tomislav "Tomo" Tomagjonović
- Dmitar Pejačević, mentioned between 1561 and 1563. The first to call himself Pejačević.

- Nikola I Pejačević

- Juraj I Pejačević, baron, married Margareta Parčević.

- Marko I Pejačević
- Matija I Pejačević, married Agata Knežević. Died in c. 1688.

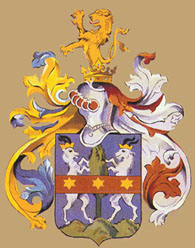
Coat of arms of Parčević family, ancestral house of Pejačević

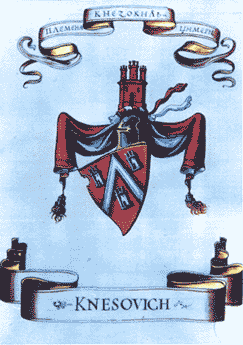
Coat of arms of Knežević family, closely related to Pejačević

=== Connections with Franciscans ===
During the long period of their residence in Bulgaria, the Pejačević family was continually connected with the Franciscan order of the Province of Silver Bosnia. The Franciscan members had arrived to Bulgaria earlier, somewhere in the mid-14th century. This has been specified by Vitomir Belaj, PhD from the Faculty of Philosophy in Zagreb in his work "Act Bulgariae ecclesiastica from Father Eusebius Fermenjin as ethnologic source" published in Miscellany for the works of the scientific conference "Life and work of the father Eusebius Fermenjin" in 1998. The author has written that the catholic Franciscans had arrived from medieval Bosnia in western Bulgaria at the time of Bosnian vicar Bartul Alvernski (Bartholomew of Alverno), who himself originated from Italy, in 1366.

Contact between the ancestors of the Pejačević family and members of the Franciscan order must have been started at the very beginning, but they were intensified by the end of the 16th century, when the Catholic enclave in Chiprovtsi was visited by missionaries sent by the pope. Clement VIII (1592–1605), for example, sent to Bulgaria his visitator Petar Zlojutrić, a Bosnian Franciscan, better known as Petar Solinat (born in the town of Soli in medieval Bosnia, today's Tuzla). Solinat did not come back to Rome, but stayed in Bulgaria and in 1601 became the first Catholic bishop of the new diocese of Sofia, situated in Chiprovtsi. He succeeded in achieving permission from the Ottoman authorities to open some new Catholic monasteries, parishes and even a new school.

Pejačevićs and their related families were affiliated with Franciscans through schooling of their children or entering of their members into the Franciscan order. One of the best examples was already mentioned Petar Parčević, the Franciscan, writer and archbishop, born in Chiprovtsi and educated in Italy.

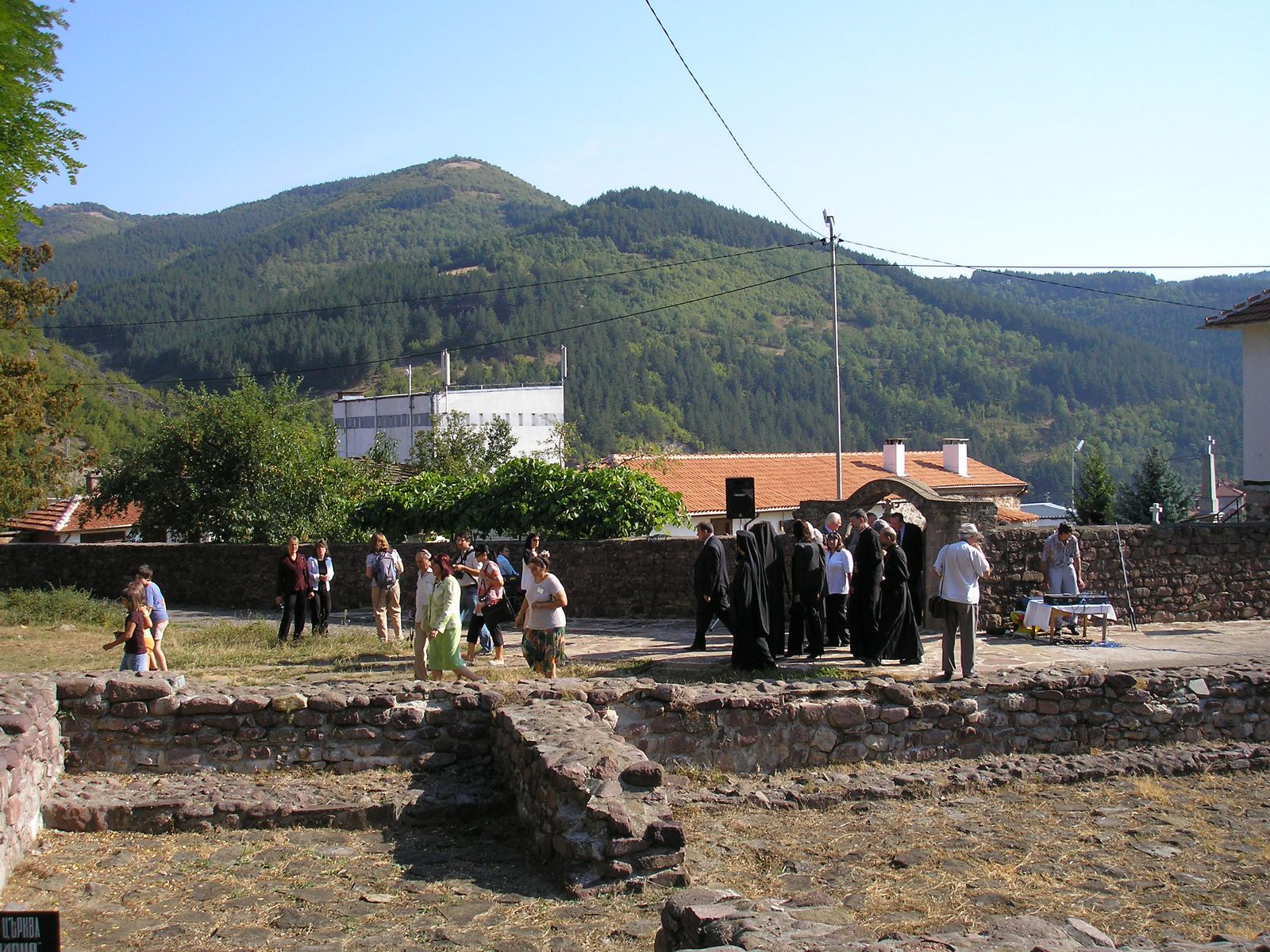
Remains of old Catholic cathedral of St. Mary in Chiprovtsi

=== Facts about Croatian origin ===
There are many facts to prove the Croatian origin of the Pejačević family. It is indisputable that a great deal of Bulgarian Catholics, especially those in the Chiprovtsi enclave and its surroundings, originated from medieval Croatian and Bosnian territory, and particularly from the Republic of Ragusa (present-day Dubrovnik). Not only the tight connection between the Bulgarian Catholics and Franciscans itself, but the organizational belonging of the monks to the Franciscan Province of Silver Bosnia prove that. There are historical documents related to Bulgarian Catholics, originating from several different regions of Bulgaria (e.g. Chiprovtsi, Sofia, Targovishte, Rakovski etc.), among which many private letters, that are written in Italian, Latin, German and Croatian language as well. Vitomir Belaj has specified that some documents have been written in Croatian Ikavian accent, the others in Dubrovnik speech, both however influenced by the Bulgarian language. It is interesting that the language of Ragusan merchants, who had lived in Bulgaria for several generations, in some documents is called "Bosnian" and in others "Illyrian".

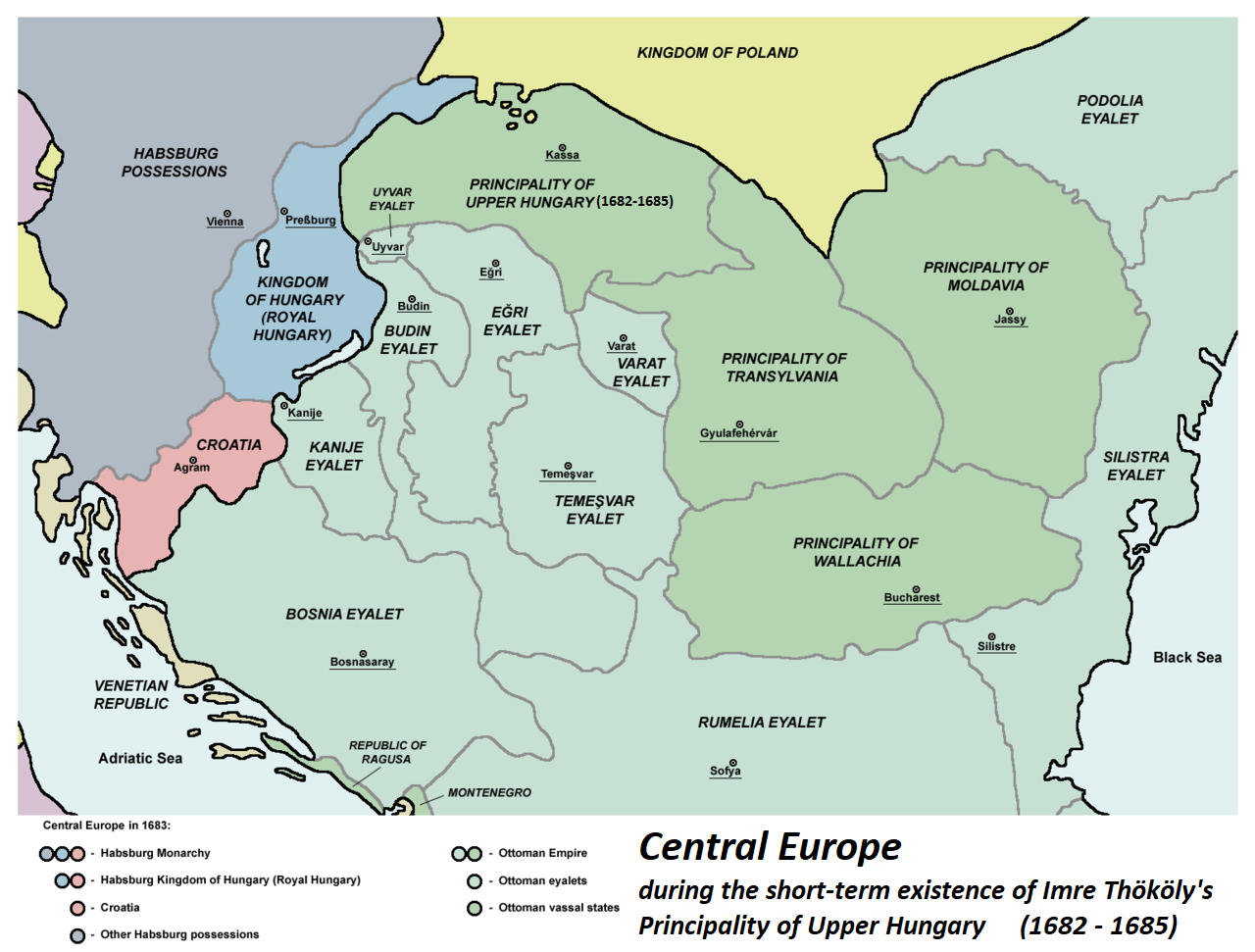
Map showing borders in 1683, prior to Great Austro-Turkish war and Chiprovtsi uprising

=== Chiprovtsi Uprising in 1688 ===
The Habsburg imperial army, supported by some European states, penetrated deep into the Ottoman territory in south-eastern Europe, which encouraged the Chiprovtsi Catholics in 1688 to rise up against the occupiers in order to free Bulgaria.

The leaders of the uprising were brothers Ivan and Mihail Stanislavov together with Bogdan Marinov, all ethnic Bulgarians. Đuro II (Bulgarian: Georgi; English: George) Pejačević (1655–1725), a son of Matija I, joined the leadership, too. After heavy fighting, the Ottomans managed to suppress the uprising by the end of 1688 and destroyed Chiprovtsi and neighboring villages like Klisura, Zhelezna and Kopilovtsi. The surviving inhabitants, including Đuro's brothers Marko II (Mark), Ivan (John) and probably Nikola (Nicholas), together with their families, fled to the north, until they reached the Habsburg controlled territories in Banat.

== Rise of the family in Slavonia and Srijem ==
=== First years ===
Pejačevićs were one of the Catholic families from Chiprovtsi in Bulgaria that moved, most probably through Wallachia and Transilvania, to the Hungarian town of Pécs and soon after that to Osijek in Slavonia, a northeastern Croatian province, in the Kingdom of Hungary. Josip Bösendorfer, PhD, Croatian historian, wrote in the scientific journal "Narodna starina" (English: Folk Art Antiquities), published in 1932 in Zagreb:

Those Chiprovtsians came to Osijek from Pecs, because they escaped from Rákóczi's uprising. Hence, they occurred in the first decade of the 18th century. All the families were connected through marriages, they witnessed each other's public documents, they were godparents and marriage witnesses, and testified in court and law procedures as well.

Bösendorfer listed the families coming from Chiprovtsi that settled in Osijek, describing them and giving their family trees, in this order: Margićs, Gegićs, Stejkićs, Čerkićs, Frankolukins, Nikolantins, Lekićs, Adamovićs, Pejačevićs.

=== Affirmation of baronage ===
On June 10, 1712, the Holy Roman Emperor and the Croato-Hungarian King Charles III of Habsburg acknowledged the Pejačević brothers as Barons on behalf of the old title their ancestors received in Bulgaria.

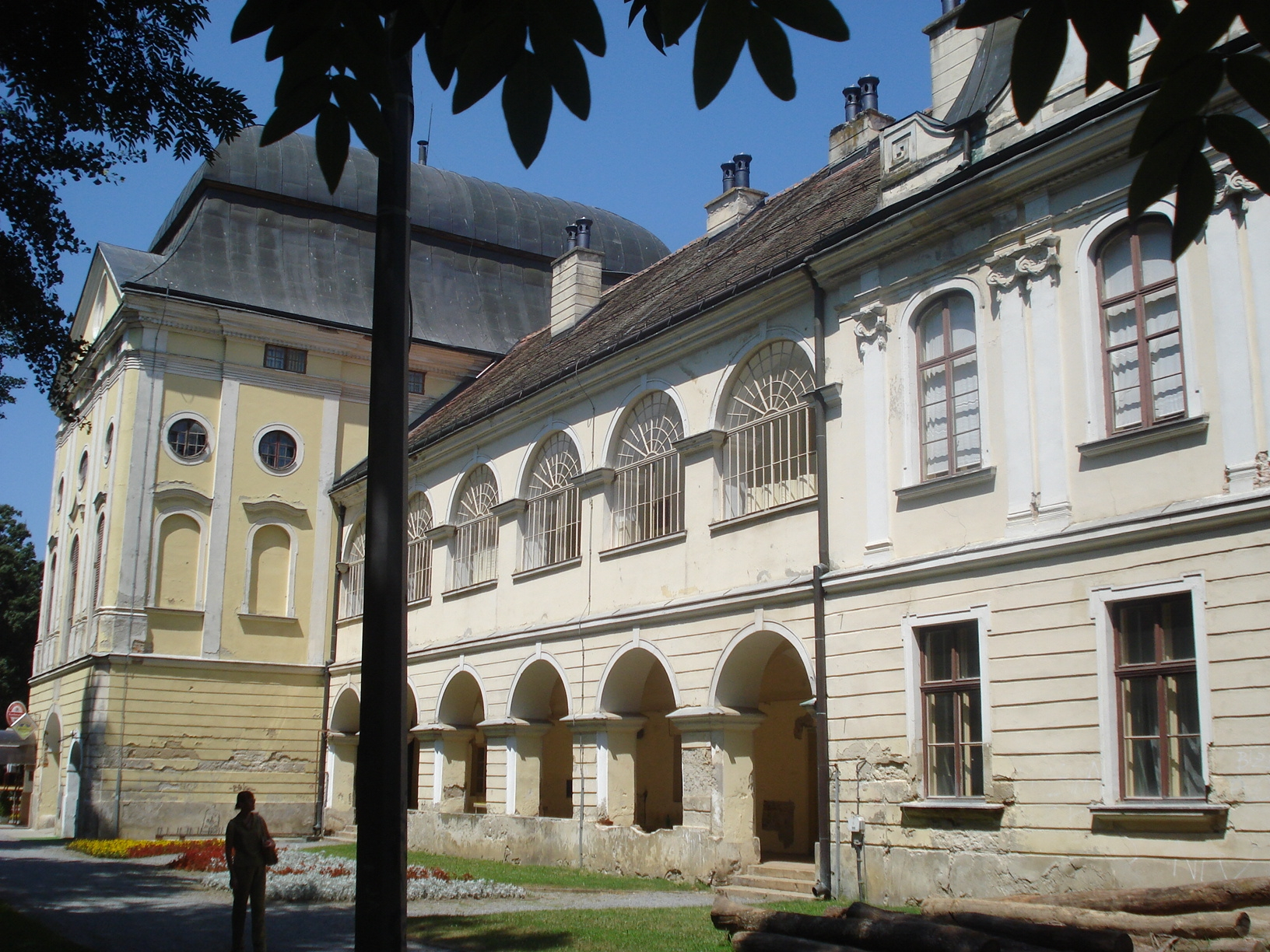
Pejačević Castle in Virovitica, seat of Virovitica branch of the family

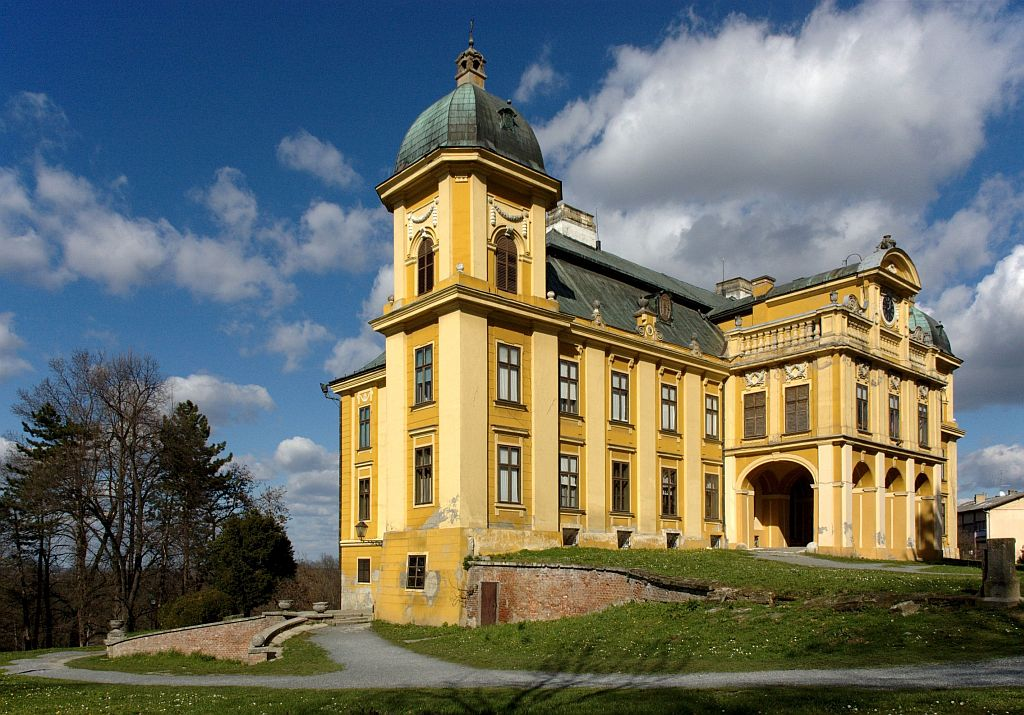
Pejačević Castle in Našice, seat of Našice branch of the family

While some family members stayed in Osijek (e.g. brothers Marko II (1664–1727) and Ivan (1666–1724)), the others settled in Srijem and Bačka, two provinces at the frontier of Croatia. In her work "Pejačević family and Virovitica", published in 2006 as a part of the Miscellany of works for the international symposium titled "725 years of Franciscans in Virovitica" (under auspices of HAZU – Croatian Academy of Sciences and Arts), professor Silvija Lučevnjak, the director of Našice Heritage Museum, wrote that Đuro Pejačević left the army service in 1696 and started to work as manager of a post office in Bač district. Like his brothers, he was very skilful in commercial matters as well, and he gained more and more property. Pejačevićs traded real estates, houses, cattle and cereals, doing business up to Austria and northern Italy.

Nikola II Leopold Pejačević (1706–1732), one of Đuro's sons, became manager of the duke Odescalchi's estate in Ilok (1728–1730). In that lucrative business he had the help from his brother Đuro III and cousin Marko III Aleksandar, a son of Ivan Pejačević.

At the beginning of the 1730s, the family strongly increased its power and property. It bought estates in Orahovica and Feričanci (1730), Našice and Podgorač (1734), and soon after that (1745) a great Mitrovica estate. In 1745 Marko III Aleksandar (1694–1762) was appointed administrator of the newly formed Srijem county, and in 1751 he was announced the grand iupanus (župan) of that county.

=== Gaining the Virovitica estate ===
In the meantime (1747), a part of Mitrovica's demesne land had been included into the Military Frontier, so Marko III Aleksandar was given the right to buy Virovitica and Retfala estates. The rest of Mitrovica's estate in his ownership got a new district seat – Ruma.

On August 29, 1749, the Holy Roman Empress and the Croato-Hungarian Queen Maria Theresa of Habsburg-Lothringen granted the Virovitica estate to Baron Marko III Aleksandar Pejačević, and it became the most significant property of the family in the second half of the 18th century. Marko's heirs kept it for the following 92 years, until 1841.

In the time of Baron Marko, the Pejačević family achieved the largest territorial expansion and became one of the greatest landowners in Slavonia. Although he faced the serf rebellions, he was recognized for improving the economic development of the area he ran. When he died in 1762, leaving no children behind, his property was inherited by his relatives Leopold (1740–1765), a great-grandson of Đuro II, and Josip II (Joseph) of Našice (1710–1787), a son of Marko II.

== Family branches ==
Considering the relative large size and territorial distribution of the family, historians have divided it into the several branches, according to the most significant assets. Hence the following branches came out: Našice branch, Virovitica branch and Ruma-Retfala branch.

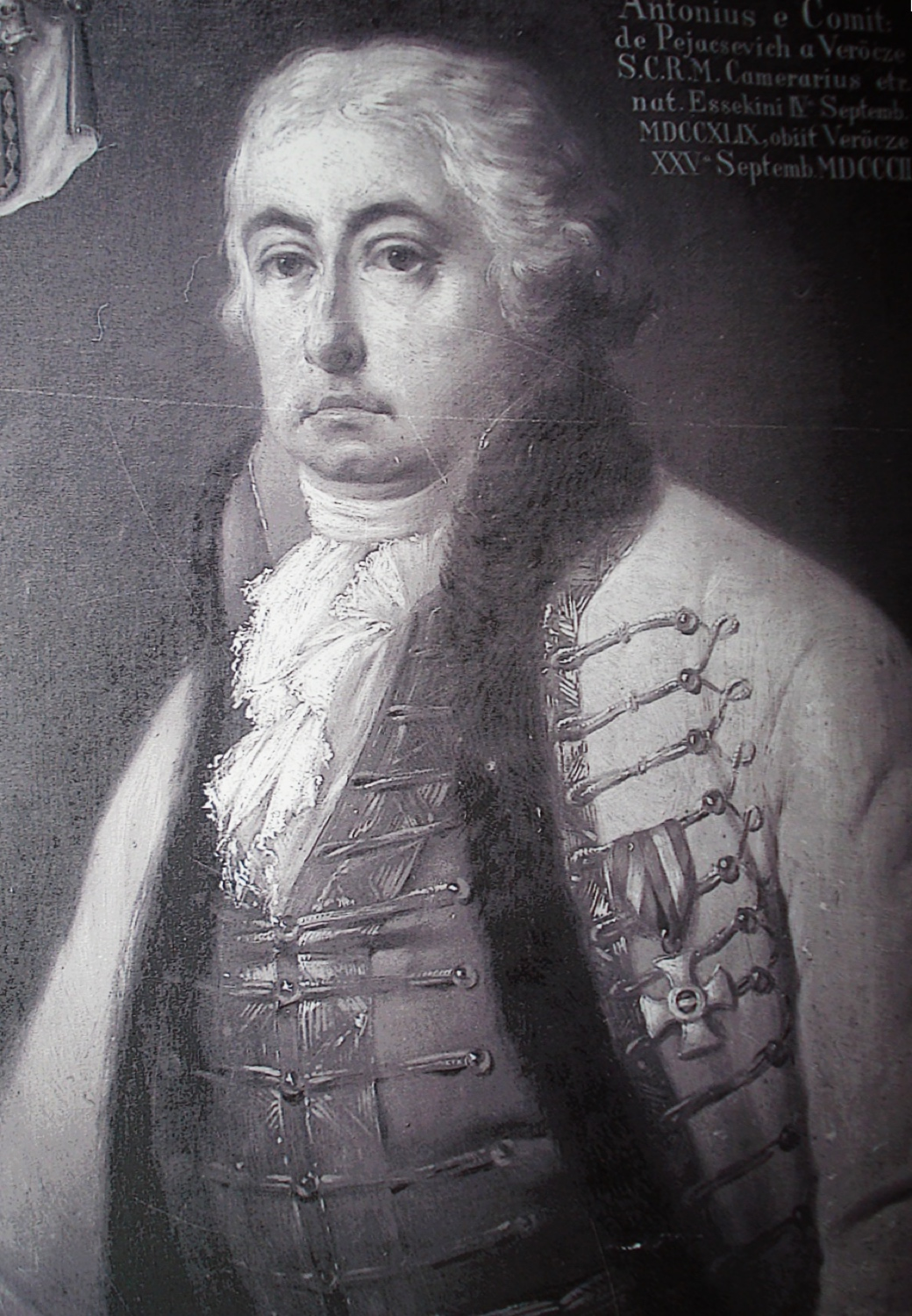
Portrait of Count Antun Pejačević (1749–1802)

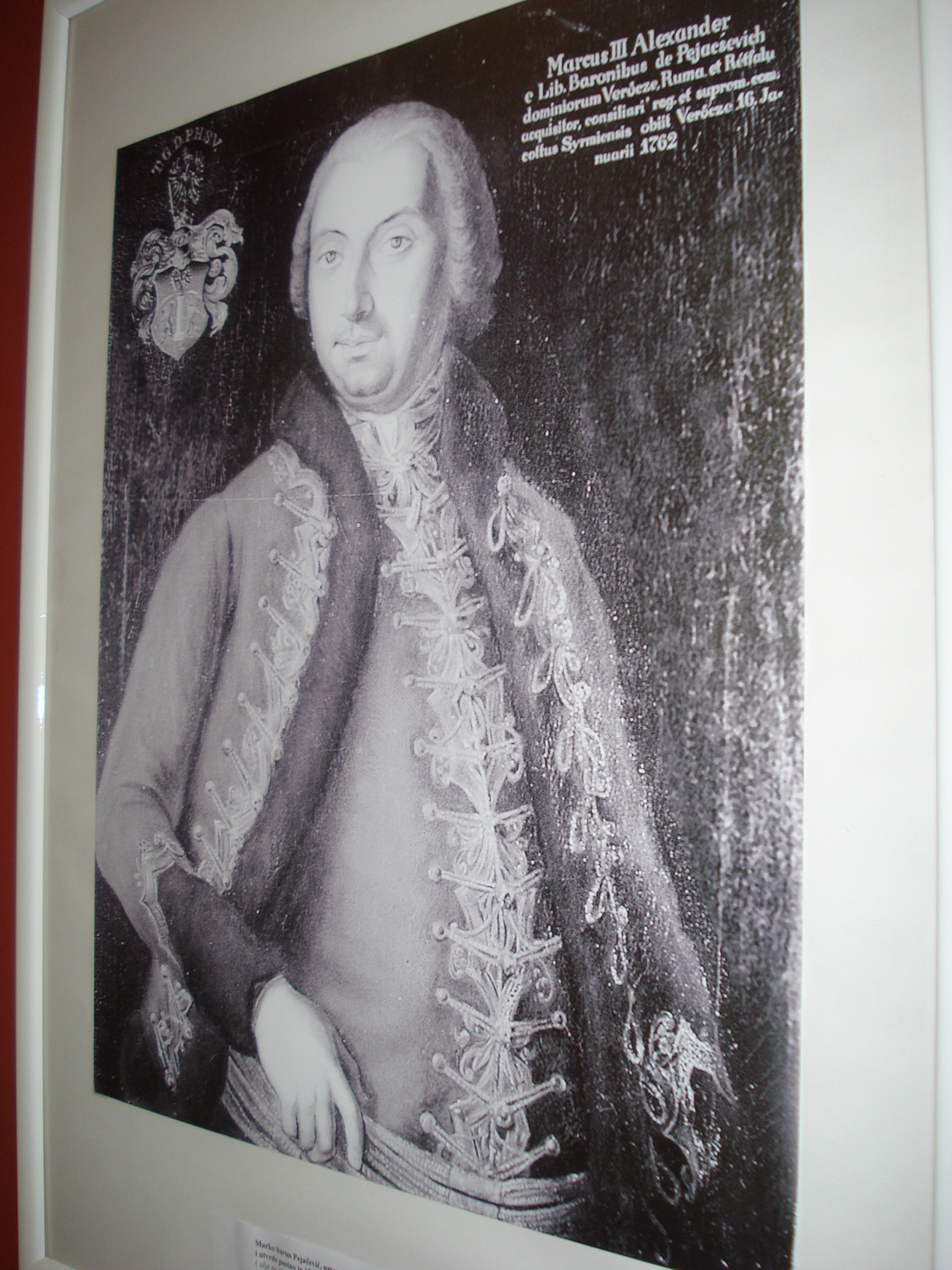
Portrait of Baron Marko III. Aleksandar Pejačević (1694–1762)

=== Našice branch ===
Našice estate was one of the family's properties managed by Josip II Pejačević. He bought it on August 3, 1734, together with his brother Ignjat Tomo (English: Ignatius (Iggy) Thomas). He built a manor house there for his family, after he had finished his military service and returned home. Našice stayed part of the family's property for the next 211 years, until 1945. As several male members of the family died within a couple of years of each other in the 1760s, Josip inherited all their possessions, because he remained the only heir in the whole family.

After Josip's death, all of his property was divided among his children Žigmund (Sigismund; 1741–1806), Josipa Elizabeta (Josephine Elizabeth), Karlo III Ferdinand (Charles III Ferdinand; 1745–1815) and Antun (Anthony; 1749–1802).

Karlo III Ferdinand is considered the founder of the Našice branch, because he inherited the estate of the same name. By the end of 18th and the beginning of 19th century he started with preparations for construction of a new castle in Našice, with the support of his son Vincencije Ljudevit (Vincent Louis; 1780–1820). The castle was completed and furnished in 1812. Later (in 1865) it was enlarged and architecturally enriched to become a gorgeous baroque edifice.

The Našice branch of the family has its representatives today, living outside Croatia. They are interested in the return of their castles in Našice, expropriated after World War II, back in their hands.

=== Virovitica branch ===
As the sole heir, Josip II Pejačević took over the Virovitica estate in 1769. On July 22, 1772, the Holy Roman Empress and the Croato-Hungarian Queen Maria Theresa of Austria gave him the title of hereditary count, and since then the whole family carries the full name "Pejačević of Virovitica".

Josip was succeeded in Virovitica by his youngest son Antun, a Habsburg imperial army lieutenant field marshal with an outstanding military career. In 1800 Antun had a beautiful new castle built in the center of Virovitica, but soon he died (in 1802) and did not live to see the completion of construction.

Virovitica branch was continued by Antun's sons Antun (c. 1775 – 1838) and Stjepan (Stephen; after 1775 – 1824), who did not run the estates successfully and fell into debt. In 1841 Antun Pejačević (1810–1862), Antun's son, sold Virovitica estate and moved to Buda, Hungary. Neither he nor his brother Ivan Nepomuk Pejačević (John of Nepomuk; 1803–1855) – also living in the capital of Hungary – had any children, so this branch of the family died out. Some historians call it the Buda branch.

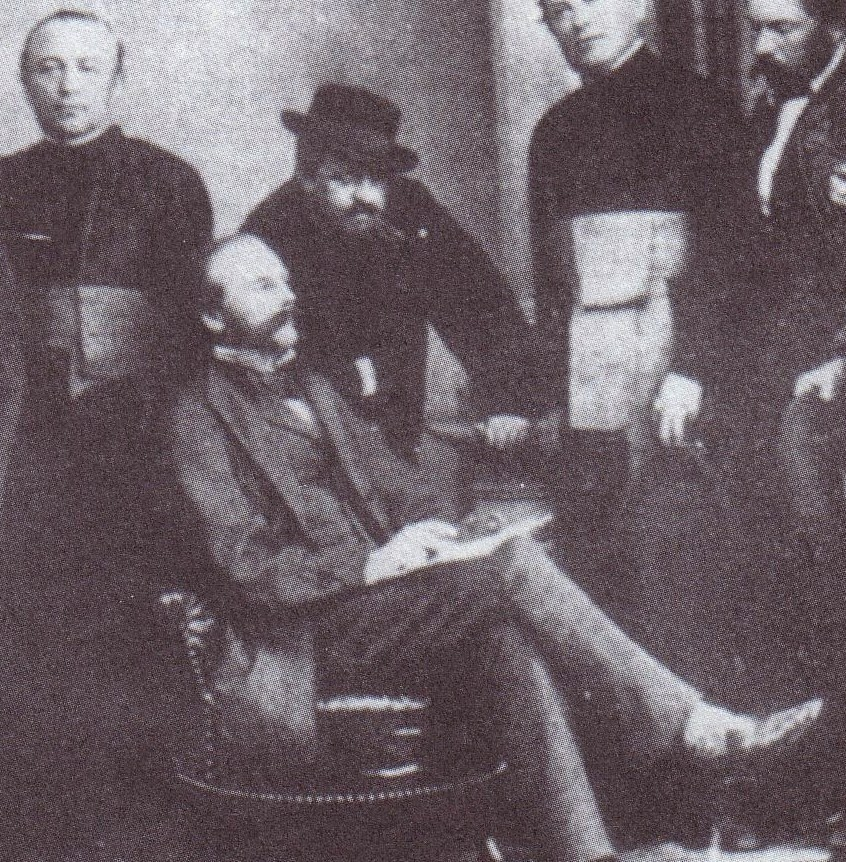
Photo of Ladislav Pejačević (1824–1901), Ban of Croatia

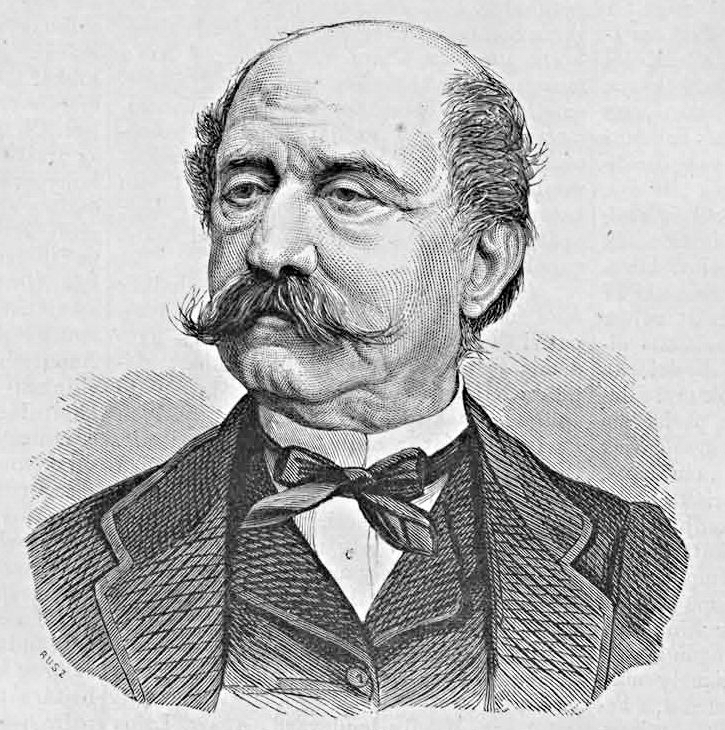
Count Petar Pejačević (1804–1887)

=== Ruma-Retfala branch ===
In his will, dated September 15, 1780, count Josip II Pejačević left his estates Ruma and Retfala to his eldest son Žigmund (1741–1806), who established the Ruma-Retfala branch of the family. Žigmund had only one son (Ivan Nepomuk; 1765–1821), but nine grandchildren, so his family branch expanded in the first half of the 19th century. His grandchildren either did not marry or had only female children, so the family branch ceased to exist at the beginning of the 20th century.

The most notable representative of that branch was Count Petar Pejačević (1804–1887), the eldest son of Ivan Nepomuk. He performed a lot of state and public functions, among which were the grand župan of Križevci County, grand župan of Virovitica County, grand župan of Srijem County, member of the Croatian Parliament, minister for Croatia, Slavonia and Dalmatia in the Hungarian government and imperial and royal chamberlain. During the turbulent period following the revolutions of 1848, he came into conflicts with the Croatian Parliament, because of his radically Hungarian nationalism-oriented attitude.

== Bans (viceroys) of Croatia ==
The Pejačević family has produced a number of prominent and famous people through history, among which were the two Bans of Croatia, Ladislav /Ladislaus/ and Teodor /Theodore/.

Count Ladislav Pejačević (1824–1901) was the son of Ferdinand Karlo Rajner /Rainer/ (1800–1878), and the grandson of Karlo III Ferdinand, the founder of Našice branch. He was an influential Croatian politician, member of Croatian Parliament from the Unionist Party of Croatia and member of the delegation of Parliament that signed the Croatian-Hungarian Agreement in 1868. In 1880 Sabor – the Parliament of Croatia – elected him as Ban of Croatia, and he remained in office until 1883.

As the reincorporation of the Croatian and Slavonian Frontiers into Croatian-Slavonian Crown land was proclaimed on July 15, 1881, Ladislav Pejačević was given the task to perform it. On August 1, 1881, he took over the administration of the former Frontiers.

On August 24, 1883, he quit after the Council of ministers in Vienna concluded that bilingual Croatian-Hungarian official emblems in Croatia, installed by the Hungarian administration, should stay and were not allowed to be removed from the official buildings. He was then succeeded by Károly Khuen-Héderváry, a Hungarian political hardliner, whose reign was marked by strong Hungarization.

Count Teodor Pejačević (1855–1928), the eldest son of Ladislav Pejačević, was a long-term župan of Virovitica County and Ban of Croatia from 1903 to 1907. He also took part as the Minister for Croatia, Slavonia and Dalmatia in the Hungarian Government from 1913 to 1917.

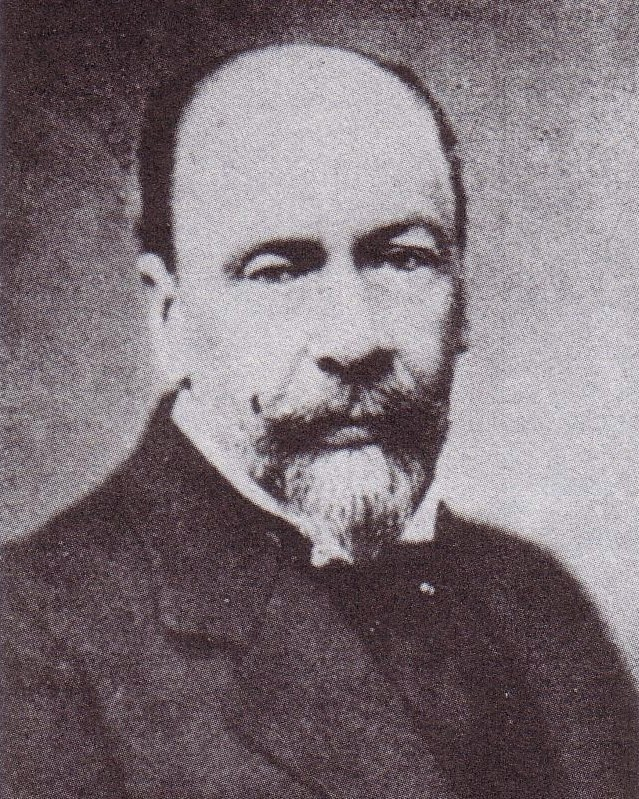
Count Teodor Pejačević (1855–1928), Ban of Croatia

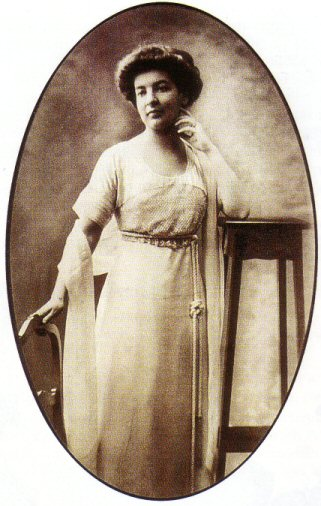
Countess Dora Pejačević (1885–1923), Croatian composer

At the beginning of the 20th century, he was faced with a new direction of Croatian policy marked by political alliance between Croats and Serbs in Austria-Hungary for mutual benefit. A Croat-Serb Coalition was formed in 1905 and it governed the Croatian lands from 1906 until the dissolution of the Dual Monarchy in 1918. As Teodor Pejačević supported the ruling Coalition in its resistance towards the Hungarian quest in 1907 to introduce the Hungarian language to be the official language on railways in Croatia, he was forced to resign.

Among his children, the best known is his daughter Dora, a Croatian composer.

== Contemporary history of the family ==
With the arrival of communism in Eastern and Central Europe, the family was expropriated and exiled. The surviving members of the family emigrated from the Eastern Bloc to countries like Austria, Switzerland, Italy, France, Germany, Great Britain, Spain, Argentina, Uruguay, Colombia, Venezuela, and the US, where some of their relatives already had lived before. With the return of democracy, family properties were returned partially to its members.

Today in Croatia lives a descendant of a female line of the Pejačević family, baron Nikola Adamović of Čepin, knight and ambassador of the Order of Malta to the Republic of Croatia.

The family members who live in Argentina are descendants of count Petar Pejačević (1908–1987), who was the second son of Marko VI (1882–1923) and the grandson of Teodor Pejačević. Marcos Pejacsevich (Osijek, 1940-), entrepreneur, president of the Argentine–Croatian Chamber of Industry and Commerce, and current head of the Argentinean branch of the family is the younger son of Petar.

Ladislav (Laszlo) Pejačević, born in 1941, a member of another branch of the family who lives in Vienna, is a descendant of Petar's younger brother Geza (born in 1917).

The successors of Marko VII, the youngest brother of Petar Pejačević, who was born in 1923 in Budapest, live in Great Britain: his son Peter, born in 1954 in London, and his grandson Alexander, born in 1988.

There are also living members of another branch of the family, who originate from Karlo IV Pejačević (1825–1880), the second son of Ferdinand Karlo Rajner and younger brother of Ladislav, ban of Croatia. Karlo's great-grandson Andrija (Andrew), born in 1910, moved to the United States of America, where he got married in 1954 in Pasadena, and where his daughter was born. The former German Minister of Defence, Karl-Theodor zu Guttenberg, is a descendant of this family, through Ludwine, Countess Pejacsevich de Verocze, married to Jakob, Count of Eltz.

== See also ==
- Bans (viceroys) of Croatia
- History of Croatia
- Croatian nobility
- Ladislav Pejačević
- Teodor Pejačević
- Dora Pejačević
- List of titled noble families in the Kingdom of Hungary
- Našice

== Bibliography ==
- "Archive for the Austrian History" of Austrian Academy of Sciences (Archiv für österreichische Geschichte" von der Kaiserlichen Akademie der Wissenschaften), 59. volume, Vienna 1880.
- Vitomir Belaj, PhD, (Faculty of Philosophy in Zagreb): "Act Bulgariae ecclesiastica from Father Eusebius Fermenjin as ethnologic source" published in Miscellany for the works of the scientific conference "Life and work of the father Eusebius Fermenjin", Našice 1998.
- Josip Bösendorfer, PhD, Croatian historian: "Colony of Chiprovtsians in Osijek" published in scientific journal "Narodna starina" (Folk Art Antiquities), Zagreb 1932.
- Prof. Silvija Lučevnjak, director of Našice Heritage Museum: "Pejačević family and Virovitica" published in of the Miscellany of works for the international symposium titled "725 years of Franciscans in Virovitica" (under auspices of HAZU – Croatian Academy of Sciences and Arts), Virovitica 2006.
