= Ladislav Pejačević =

Ban of Croatia from 1880 to 1883

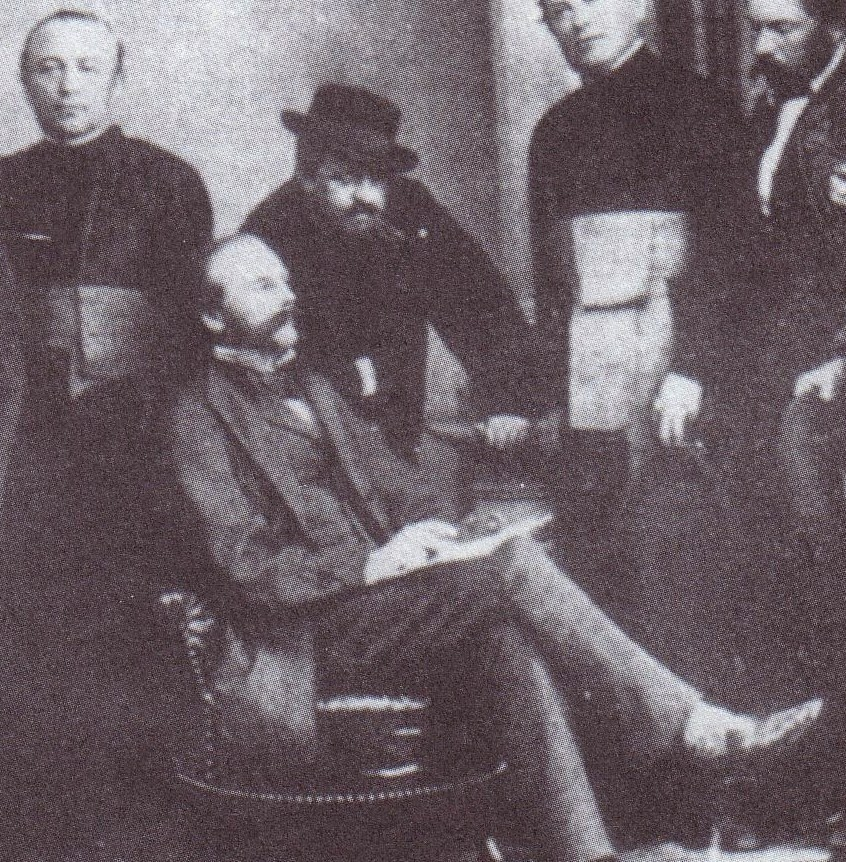
- Ladislaus Peyachevich of Virovitica

Ban of Croatia-Slavonia
- In office 21 February 1880 – 4 September 1883
- Preceded by: Ivan Mažuranić
- Succeeded by: Hermann Ramberg

Personal details
- Born: 5 April 1824 Sopron, Kingdom of Hungary, Austrian Empire
- Died: 7 April 1901 (aged 76) Našice, Virovitica County, Kingdom of Croatia-Slavonia, Austria-Hungary
- Party: Unionist Party
- Spouse(s): Gabrijela née Döry de Jobaháza, baroness
- Children: 3, including Teodor

Count Ladislav Pejačević of Virovitica (English: Ladislaus Peyachevich of Virovitica, Croatian: Ladislav Pejačević Virovitički, Hungarian: Pejácsevich László; Sopron, Kingdom of Hungary 5 April 1824 – Našice, 7 April 1901) was a Croatian aristocrat and statesman, a member of the Pejačević noble family, remarkable and influential in the Kingdom of Croatia-Slavonia within the Austro-Hungarian Empire. He was the Ban (viceroy) of Croatia between 1880 and 1883.

== Biography ==
Ladislav Pejačević was the eldest son of Ferdinand Karlo Rajner /Ferdinand Charles Rainer/ (1800–1878) whose mother was Hungarian Countess Mária Eleonóra née Erdődy /monyorókeréki and monoszlói branch/ (1769–1840). His wife was Marija /Mary/ née Döry de Jobaháza. His grandfather Karlo III Ferdinand was the founder of Našice branch of the family.

On 25 November 1852 he married the baroness Gabrijela /Gabrielle/ Döry de Jobaháza and they had three children: Marija, Teodor /Theodore/ and Mario Marko Aleksandar.

Pejačević entered politics as a young man, having become an assessor at the Croatian Parliament seat in Zagreb from 1844 until 1848. As a very influential Croatian politician, he was member of Parliament from the Unionist Party of Croatia and member of the delegation of Parliament that signed the Croatian-Hungarian Agreement in 1868. In 1880 Sabor - the Parliament of Croatia - elected him as Ban of Croatia, and he stayed in office from 21 February 1880 until 4 September 1883.

As the reincorporation of the Croatian and Slavonian Frontiers into Croatian-Slavonian Crown land was proclaimed on 15 July 1881, Pejačević was given the task to perform it. On 1 August 1881 he took over the administration of the former Frontiers.

On 24 August 1883 he quit after the Council of ministers in Vienna concluded that bilingual Croatian-Hungarian official emblems in Croatia, installed by the Hungarian administration, should stay and were not allowed to be removed from the official buildings. On 4 September 1883 Hermann Ramberg became the royal commissioner with Ban authorities. Ramberg was then succeeded by Károly Khuen-Héderváry, a Hungarian political hardliner, whose reign was marked by strong Hungarization.

During his life, Ladislav Pejačević invested a lot to improve and enlarge business activities of his estates, and contributed to beauty and glamour of his castles, palaces and parks, especially the Našice castle. He died in Našice on 7 April 1901, leaving his property to his son Teodor.

== See also ==
- House of Pejačević
- Ban of Croatia
- Croatian nobility
- Teodor Pejačević

Political offices
Preceded by Ivan Mažuranić	Ban of Croatia-Slavonia; 1880–1883	Succeeded by Hermann Ramberg
