= Pejačević Castle in Našice =

Baroque-revival style structure in Našice

- Našice, Osijek-Baranja County, Croatia
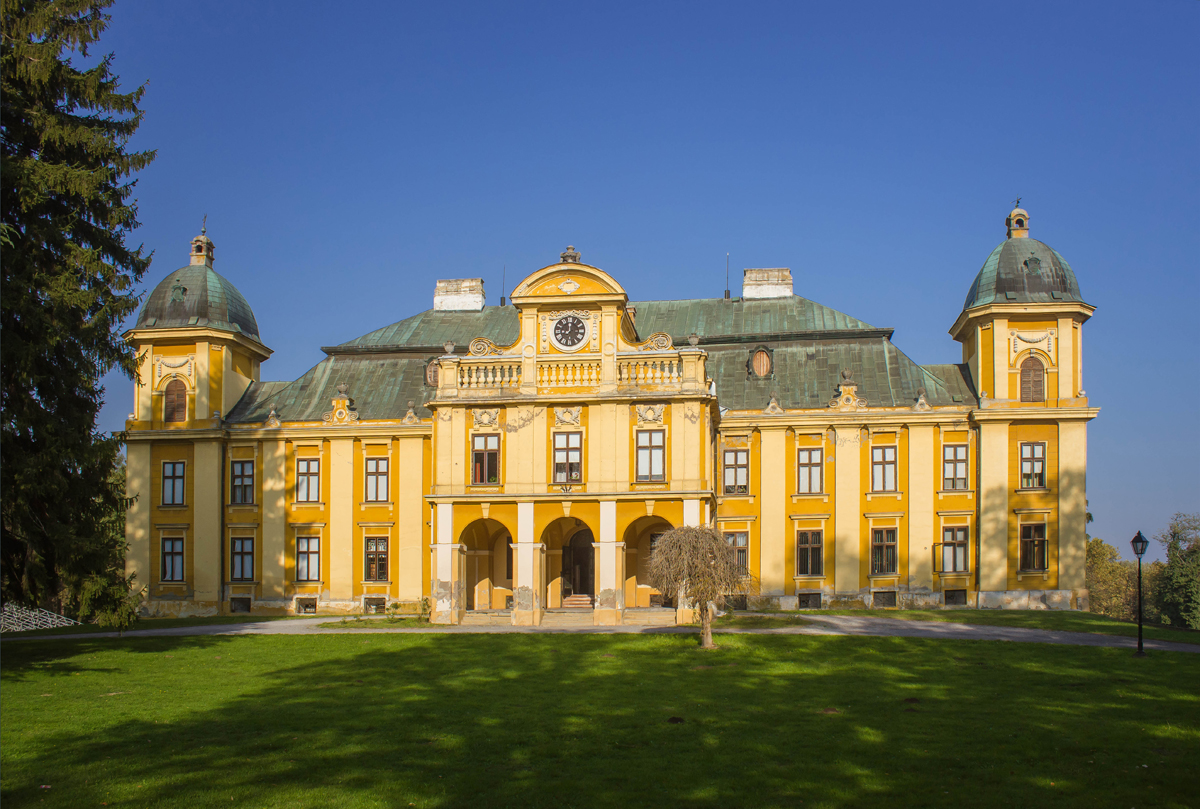
- Front side of the castle

Site information
- Type: Lowland castle
- Controlled by: Pejačević family
- Open to the public: Regional Museum
- Condition: renewed

Location
- Location within Croatia
- Coordinates: 45.491873°N 18.093117°E

Site history
- Built: 1811 - 1812
- Built by: Vincencije Ljudevit Pejačević *1780–†1820

Pejačević Castle in Našice (Croatian: Dvorac Pejačević u Našicama) is a Baroque-revival style lowland structure in Našice, a town in Osijek-Baranja County, northeastern Croatia. The Building bears its name thanks to the Pejačević noble family, whose members owned several castles in the region of Slavonia in the modern era.

== History ==
The castle was built in 1811/1812 by the order of Vincencije Ljudevit Pejačević (*1780–†1820). After an earthquake in 1817 it was repaired and in the middle of the 19th century it was renovated and expanded by Vincencije's brother Ferdinand Karlo Rajner (*1800–†1878) and his son Ladislav (*1824–†1901), who later became Ban of Croatia. The building was enlarged with thirteen new window openings added on the north and south facades. A decorative gable with volutes, a balustrade and a clock were also added.

Apart from its artistic significance, Pejačević Castle also has historical significance. In the late 19th and early 20th century, the famous Croatian composer Dora Pejačević, the daughter of Croatian Ban Teodor, lived there.

During the World War II, the castle was used by the German Army between 1943 and 1945. A German war hospital was located in the basement. The facade and roof of the castle were damaged during the war.

After the war, the castle was used for various purposes: as a barracks, school, kindergarten or as an office of the state administration, for various associations, etc. Today, the castle houses the local history museum, the city music orchestra, the city library with the reading room and the art gallery.

== Description ==
Due to the slope of the terrain, the castle is one-floor building on the entrance side and two-floor one on the park side. It is richly decorated with stucco, wood paneling and built-in furniture. In the large lobby there is a double, semi-visible staircase with a stone railings.

First original castle from 1812 was built in the classicist style and was smaller than today's one. It had a rectangular floor plan, with nine window openings on the southern entrance facade. The central part of the castle, in the width of three window axes, was highlighted by larger windows and gazebo supported by three arches. The look of the castle was later expanded and changed.

Not far from the castle there is a smaller building called the Small Castle. This is a ground floor building built in 1904/1905 in the neoclassical style by the order of count Marko VI Pejačević (*1882-†1923). It served as a hunting lodge. In front of the castle there was a spacious terraced garden. Today the building houses radio rooms, a music school and several clubs.

A park was created next to the castle, which was designed after the castle was finished in 1812. Before the castle was built, this area was covered with natural forests. Around 1850, count Ladislav Pejačević arranged the park when he decorated the castle. A greenhouse, drawn on an old cadastral plan, also had to be built at that time, although its historicist facade may have been built later. The park from the mid-19th century has the character of landscape parks. In the second half of the 19th century, the park was extended northwards to the surface of a natural forest, where a lake with a small island was created.

Today, the park, which covers an area of about 34.5 hectares has been impoverished by numerous contents and details that can be seen in old photographs. The park has recently almost turned into a forest and only a few views and meadows north of the castle remind us of the former design wealth of the castle park.

== Gallery ==
Park side of the castle	A painting of Small Castle	Park at the castle

== See also ==
- List of castles in Croatia
- Timeline of Croatian history
- Architecture of Croatia
