= Sándor Khuen-Héderváry =

Count Sándor Khuen-Héderváry de Hédervár
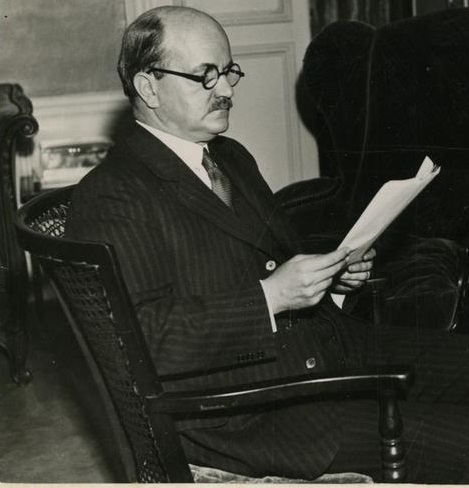
- Sándor Khuen-Héderváry in the 1930s

Permanent Deputy Minister of Foreign Affairs
- In office 25 October 1925 – 11 December 1933
- Preceded by: Kálmán Kánya
- Succeeded by: András Hóry

Personal details
- Born: 16 June 1881 Hédervár, Austria-Hungary
- Died: around 8 September 1946 (aged 65) Szentendre, Hungary
- Spouse: Anna Farkas de Alsóőr

Count Sándor Khuen-Héderváry de Hédervár (16 June 1881 – around 8 September 1946) was a Hungarian diplomat and politician. He was influential in the organisation of an independent Hungarian foreign service and diplomatic mission following the World War I. He was Hungarian Ambassador to France from 1933 to 1941.

== Family ==
He was born into an aristocratic family of Austrian origin in Hédervár in Győr County as the elder son of Count Károly Khuen-Héderváry de Hédervár and Countess Margit Teleki de Szék. His father served as Ban of Croatia from 1883 to 1903 then Prime Minister of Hungary in 1903 and from 1910 to 1912. His younger brother was Károly Jr. (1888–1960), a military officer and scout. Sándor's second cousin was István Bethlen, the prime minister in the 1920s, on the maternal side.

Sándor Khuen-Héderváry married Anna Farkas de Alsóőr in 1926, becoming her third husband. Their marriage remained childless.

== Early career ==
Khuen-Héderváry finished his studies at the Theological College of Pécs. Shortly after he became an honorary servants' judge or magistrate (Hungarian: szolgabíró) in Fejér County and he was ordained a doctor of law in April 1904. In the same year, he joined the Foreign Ministry of Austria-Hungary, passing the diplomatic qualification examination in 1905. He served as an attaché at the Austro-Hungarian embassy in Bucharest between 1905 and 1907, before working in the ministry's chief department in Vienna from 1907 to 1908. He was awarded the title of royal and imperial chamberlain in 1906.

He functioned as an attaché at the embassy in Madrid from 1908 to 1910. He was secretary at the embassy in London from 1910 until 1912, when he was transferred to Berlin, serving in this capacity until 1918, when he was promoted to the rank councillor there. At the end of the WW1, Khuen-Héderváry was transferred to the dual ministry's press department.

== Role in the Hungarian foreign service ==
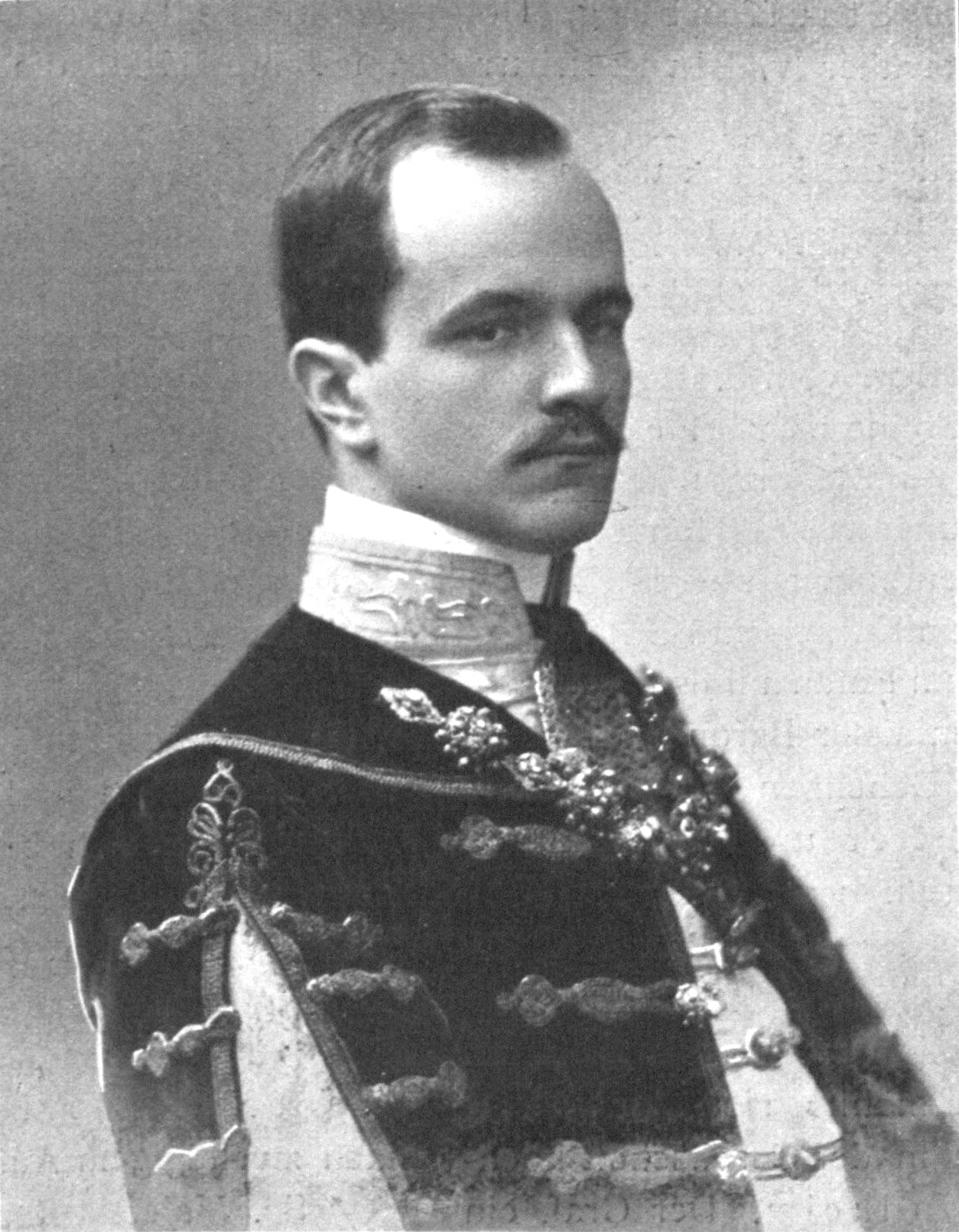
Khuen-Héderváry in 1906

Following the dissolution of Austria-Hungary and the fall of the short-lived Hungarian Soviet Republic, Khuen-Héderváry returned to the foreign service in the autumn of 1919. He became head of the political department of the newly established independent Hungarian Ministry of Foreign Affairs in the rank of Class I councillor in 1920. Khuen-Héderváry and his superior Kálmán Kánya, the deputy foreign minister played eminent role in the establishment of the operative organizational structure of the new ministry, modeling the abolished Austro-Hungarian Foreign Service, where most of the Hungarian apparatus served earlier and had previously been socialized.

Khuen-Héderváry usually accompanied his second cousin István Bethlen, the Prime Minister of Hungary in his foreign trips in the 1920s, actively influencing his political decisions. He took a leading role in the negotiation process with the Hungarian–Yugoslav and Hungarian–Romanian border adjustment committees over the new borders of Hungary following the Treaty of Trianon in August 1921. He was present at the conference in Venice in October 1921, which was convened to settle the issue of the Uprising in West Hungary. He was also a member of the Hungarian delegation to the Genoa Conference in April–May 1922. Both Kánya and Khuen-Héderváry negotiated with various organizations in order to break-up of the Kingdom of Yugoslavia from the early 1920s onwards. Khuen-Héderváry was a proponent to establish official diplomatic relationship with the Soviet Union. Throughout the 1920s, Khuen-Héderváry was involved in the negotiations with the League of Nations over various matters, most notably regarding the situation of the Hungarian minorities in the neighboring countries.

Replacing Kálmán Kánya, who was appointed Hungarian Ambassador to Germany, Khuen-Héderváry became the Permanent Deputy Minister of Foreign Affairs with the rank extraordinary envoy and minister plenipotentiary on 25 October 1925, serving under minister Lajos Walko. Khuen-Héderváry held the position until the end of 1933. He escorted Bethlen in his visit to Italy in April 1927, where they negotiated with Benito Mussolini. He was involved in the negotiations with the League of Nations in the spring of 1928. Khuen-Héderváry was a member of the Paris-based Académie Diplomatique Internationale (ADI). Following the resignation of Walko in November 1930, Bethlen intended to appoint Khuen-Héderváry as his successor, but he met with the fierce opposition of Regent Miklós Horthy and Gyula Károlyi eventually gained the position instead of him.

== Later career ==
Following the resignation of István Bethlen in August 1931 and the gradual rightward shift of Hungarian politics, Khuen-Héderváry gradually lost political influence over the foreign affairs in Hungary. He was appointed as Hungarian Ambassador to France in December 1933. He arrived to Paris in January 1934, presenting his credentials to French President Albert Lebrun. His departure was a result of the far-right prime minister Gyula Gömbös' successful political goal, who aimed to separate Bethlen's conservative confidants from shaping Hungary's foreign political orientation. His first year as ambassador was overshadowed by the assassination of King Alexander I of Yugoslavia and French Foreign Minister Louis Barthou in Marseille in October 1934, since an investigation by the French police quickly established that the Croatian Ustaše assassins had been trained and armed in Hungary.

According to the memoir of diplomat György Barcza, Khuen-Héderváry had strong confidence that the French government will act hard against the Nazi Germany if Adolf Hitler would declare war. He was considered a strong ally of Pál Teleki in the late 1930s. Khuen-Héderváry was retired by the newly established cabinet of László Bárdossy in July 1941. Horthy appointed him a member of the Upper House at the end of 1942.

== Death ==
Following the World War II, Khuen-Héderváry retired from diplomatic and political service and lived in Szentendre. A Soviet general was boarded in his apartment, according to ambassador Pál Auer, who visited him in February 1946. Khuen-Héderváry disappeared on 8 September 1946. Suffering depression and nervous breakdown, he plausibly committed suicide, jumping into the Danube. His clothes, wedding ring and briefcase were found on the banks of the river. His body was found in February 1947 in the Danube near Szentendre.

== Honours ==
=== National honours ===
- Imperial Austrian Order of Franz Joseph, Ribbon (1908)
- Order of Merit of the Kingdom of Hungary, Grand Cross (1932)
- Signum Laudis, Grand Gold Medal (1941)
- Order of Vitéz (1942)

=== Foreign honours ===
- France
  - Legion of Honour, Grand Cross (1941)
- Holy See
  - Order of Pope Pius IX, Knight Grand Cross
- Portugal
  - Military Order of Christ, Grand Cross (1933)
- Romania
  - Order of the Star of Romania, Grand Cross (1907)
- Spain
  - Order of Charles III (1910)

== Sources ==
- Varga, Lujza (2023). "Sándor Khuen-Héderváry – Grey Eminence of the Hungarian Foreign Policy during the Interwar Period". In Botos, Máté; Fejérdy, Gergely (eds.). Honore et Virtute. A közép-európai arisztokrácia sorsa a XX. században. L'Harmattan. pp. 87–105. ISBN 978-963-414-829-6.
