= Hermann von Ramberg =

Austrian politician (1820–1899)

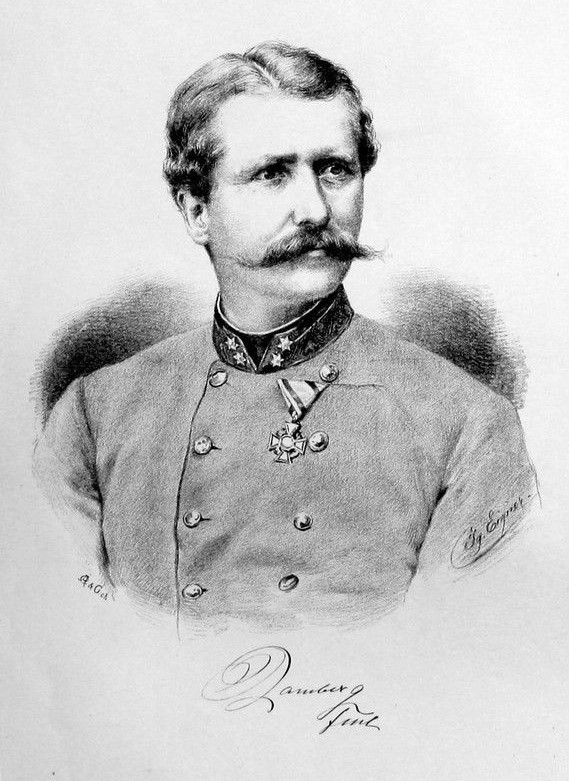

Ban of Croatia-Slavonia (acting)
- In office 4 September 1883 – 1 December 1883
- Preceded by: Ladislav Pejačević
- Succeeded by: Károly Khuen-Héderváry

Personal details
- Born: 24 November 1820 Vienna, Austrian Empire
- Died: 26 December 1899 (aged 79) Graz, Duchy of Styria, Austria-Hungary

Hermann von Ramberg (24 November 1820, in Vienna – 26 December 1899, in Graz) was an Austrian statesman who served as acting Ban of Croatia-Slavonia in 1883.
