= Pejačević Castle in Virovitica =

Castle in Virovitica, Croatia

Pejačević Castle in Virovitica Dvorac Pejačević u Virovitici
- Virovitica, Slavonia region, Croatia
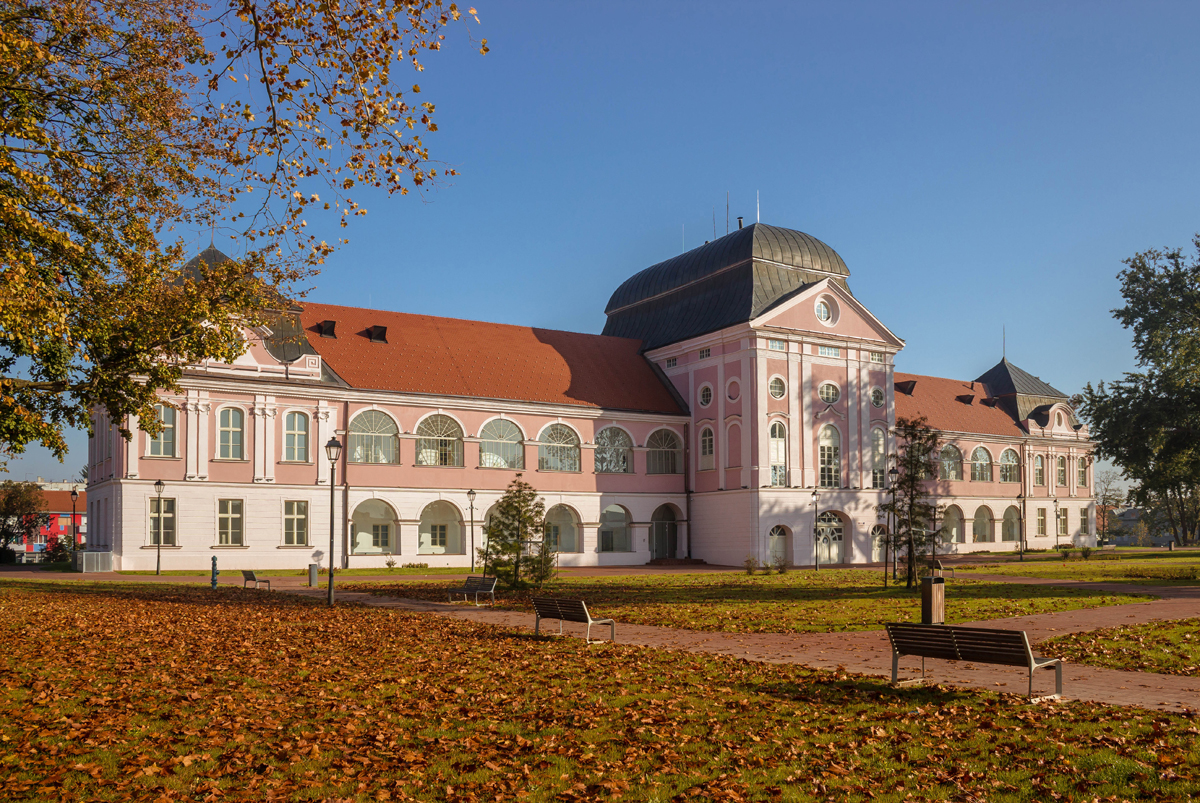
- Pejačević Castle - southwest view

Site information
- Type: Manor house
- Owner: Town of Virovitica
- Controlled by: Pejačević noble family
- Open to the public: Yes (Town museum)
- Condition: Slightly renovated

Location
- Location within Croatia
- Coordinates: 45.834681°N 17.386103°E

Site history
- Built: 1800-1804
- Built by: Antun Pejačević

Pejačević Manor is located in the Virovitica, which nowadays forms a part of the city centre of the city of Virovitica . It is one of several castles owned by the members of Pejačević noble family in the croatian region of Slavonia.

== History ==
According to the sign located on the facade above the entrance, the manor was built by count Antun Pejačević in 1804, with the actual construction beginning in 1800.

The Virovitica Estate was acquired by the Pejačević Counts as a grant by the then Austrian Empress and Croatian-Hungarian Queen Maria Theresa in 1750. In the beginning it started out as a relatively small estate.

Today, there is the City Museum on the upper floor of the castle.

== Architecture ==
The refined classical manor is composed of three wings shaped in the straight form. The internal space is organised around a central hallway with rooms aligned on either side. The central axis is highlighted by the grand hall and central dome.

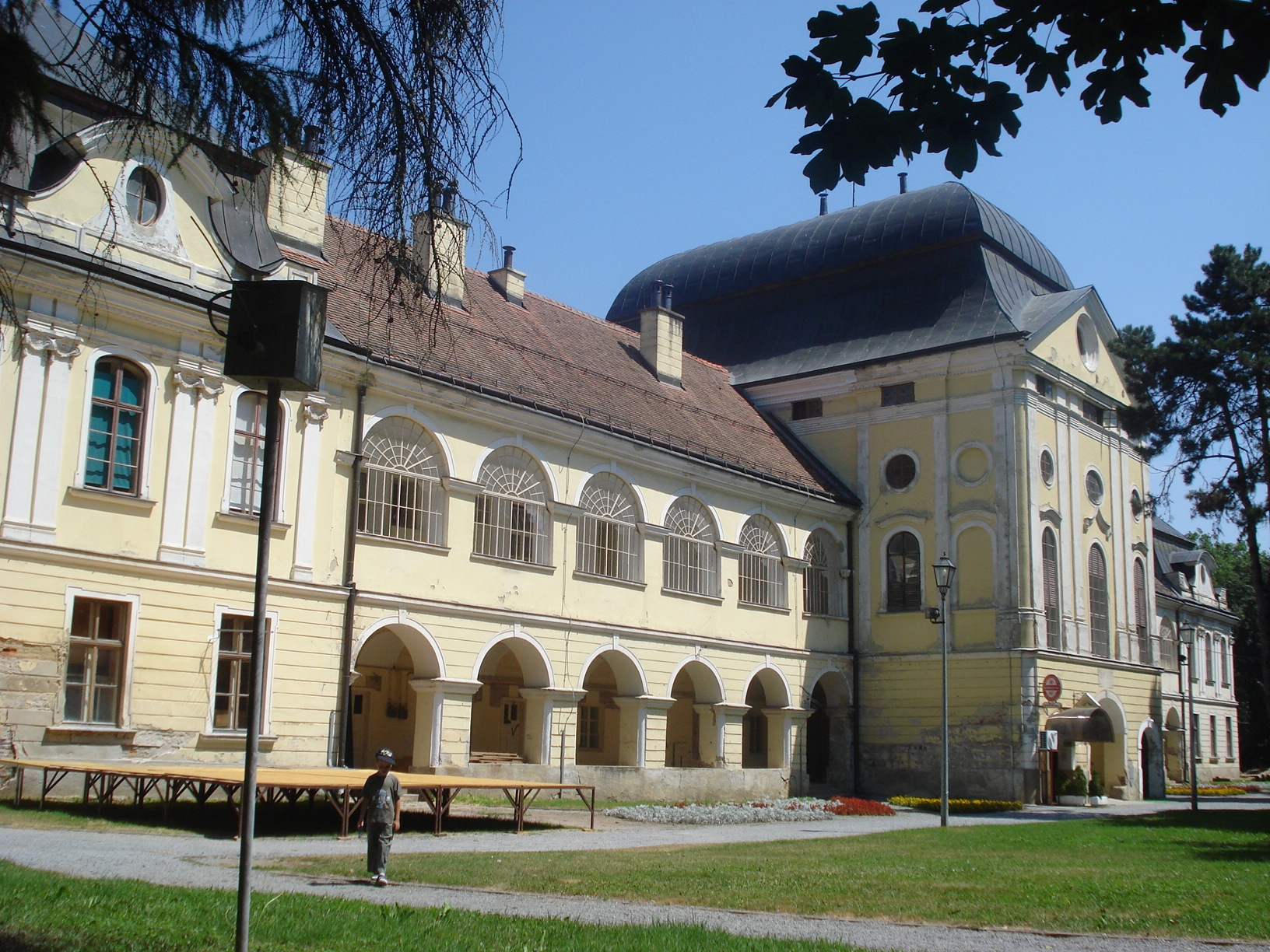
Southwest view

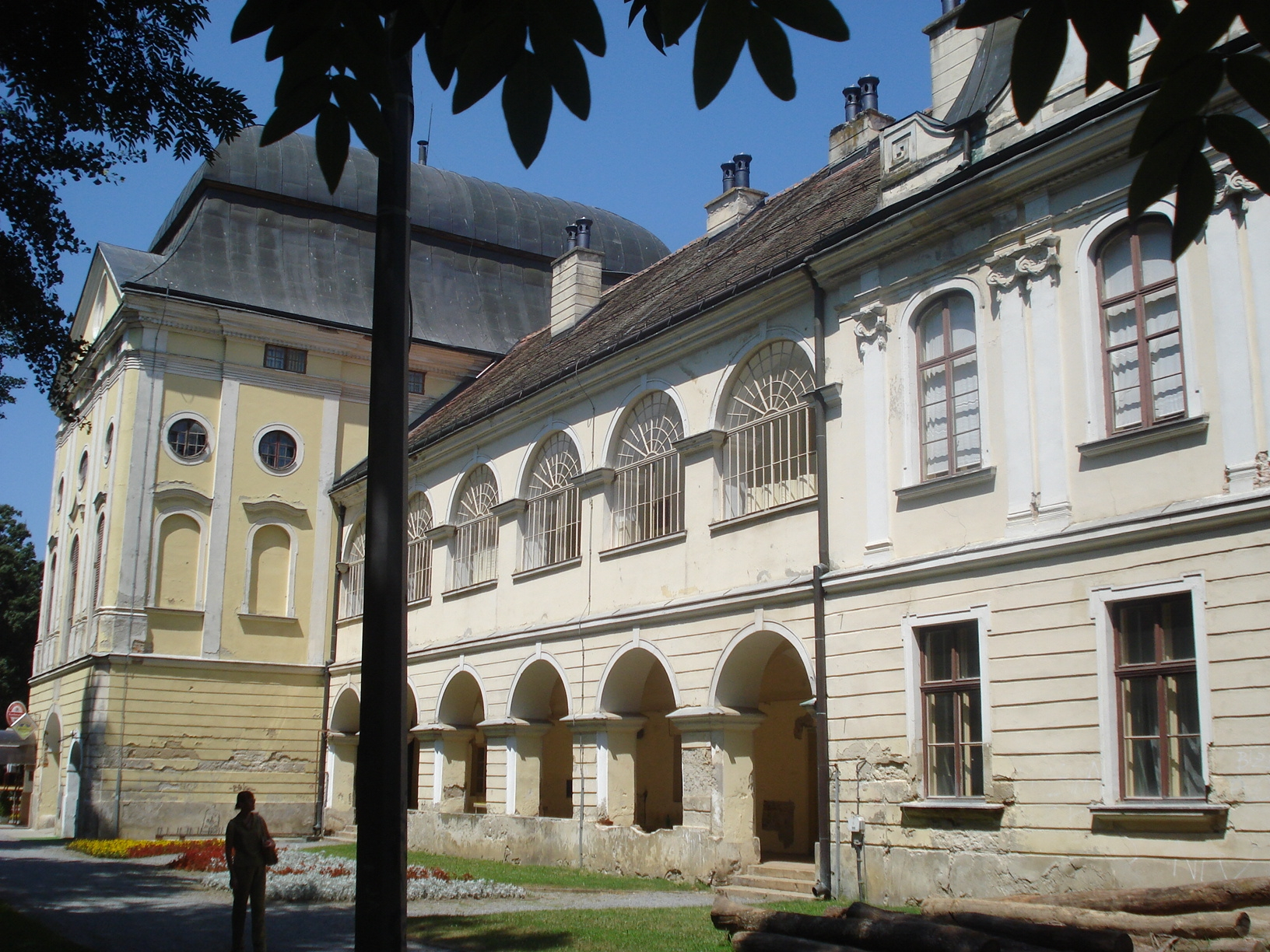
Southeast view

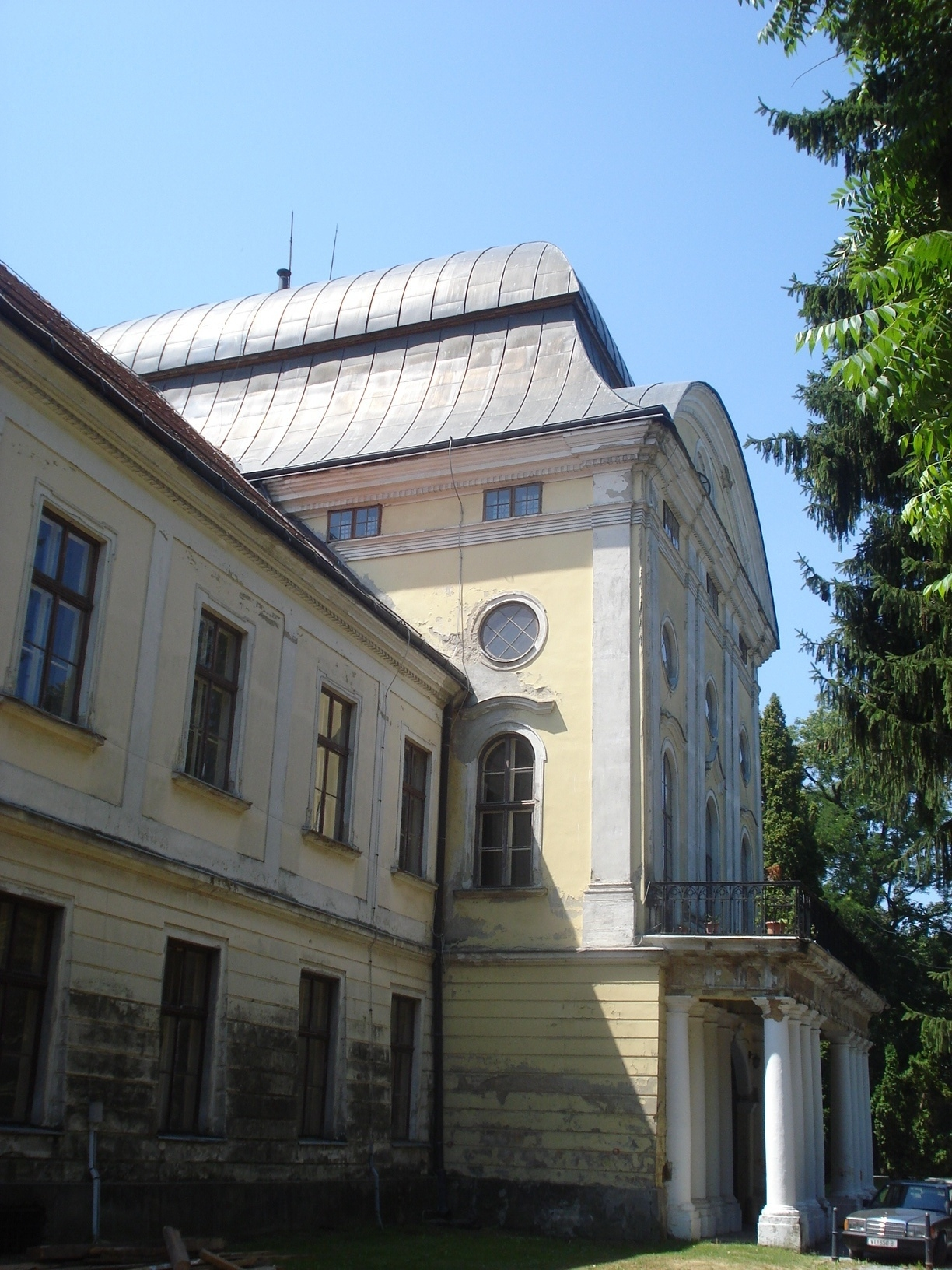
Entrance

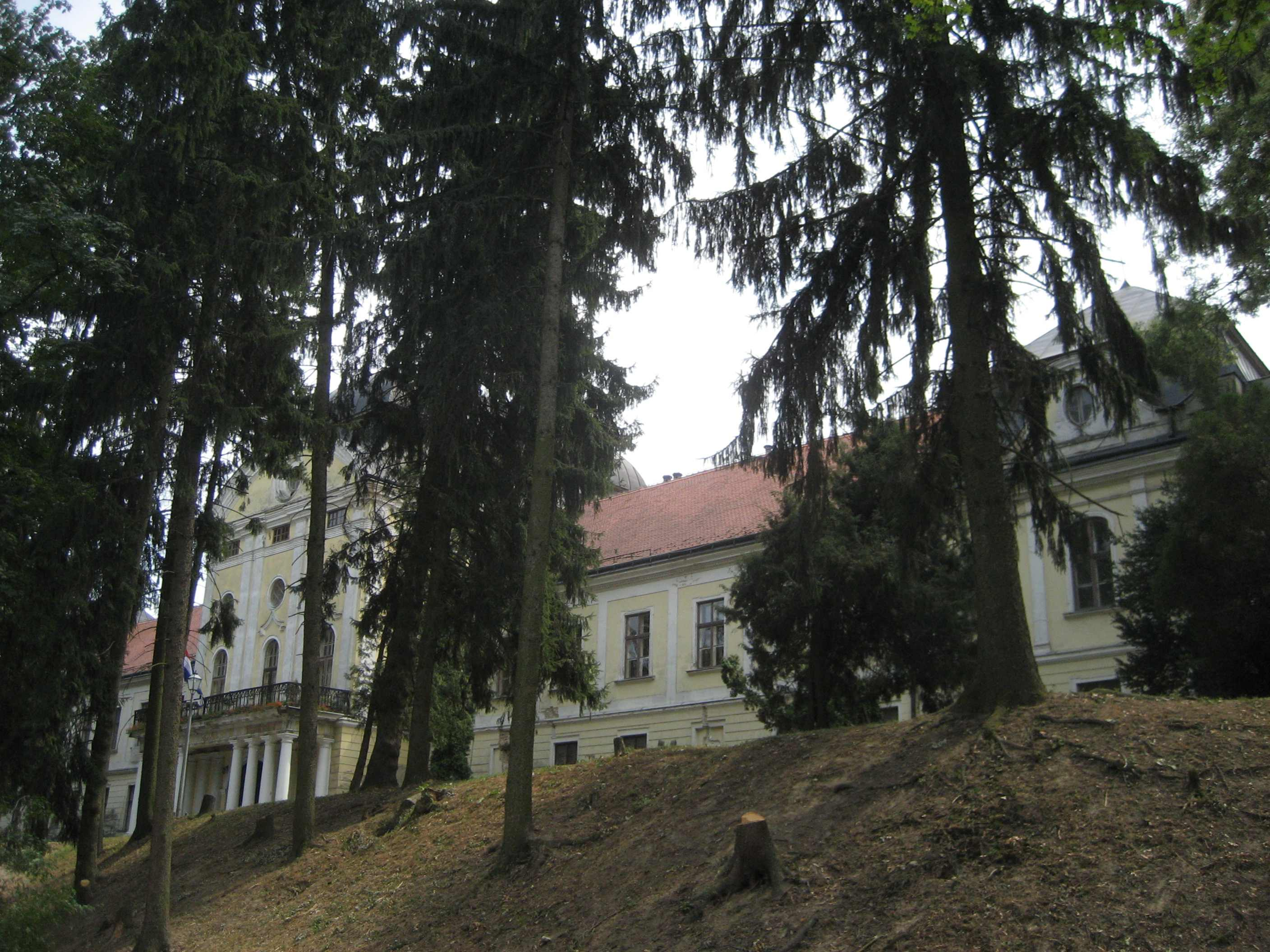
Northwest view

== See also ==
- House of Pejačević
- List of castles in Croatia
- Museum
