= Margit Teleki =

Hungarian noblewoman

- Countess of Szék
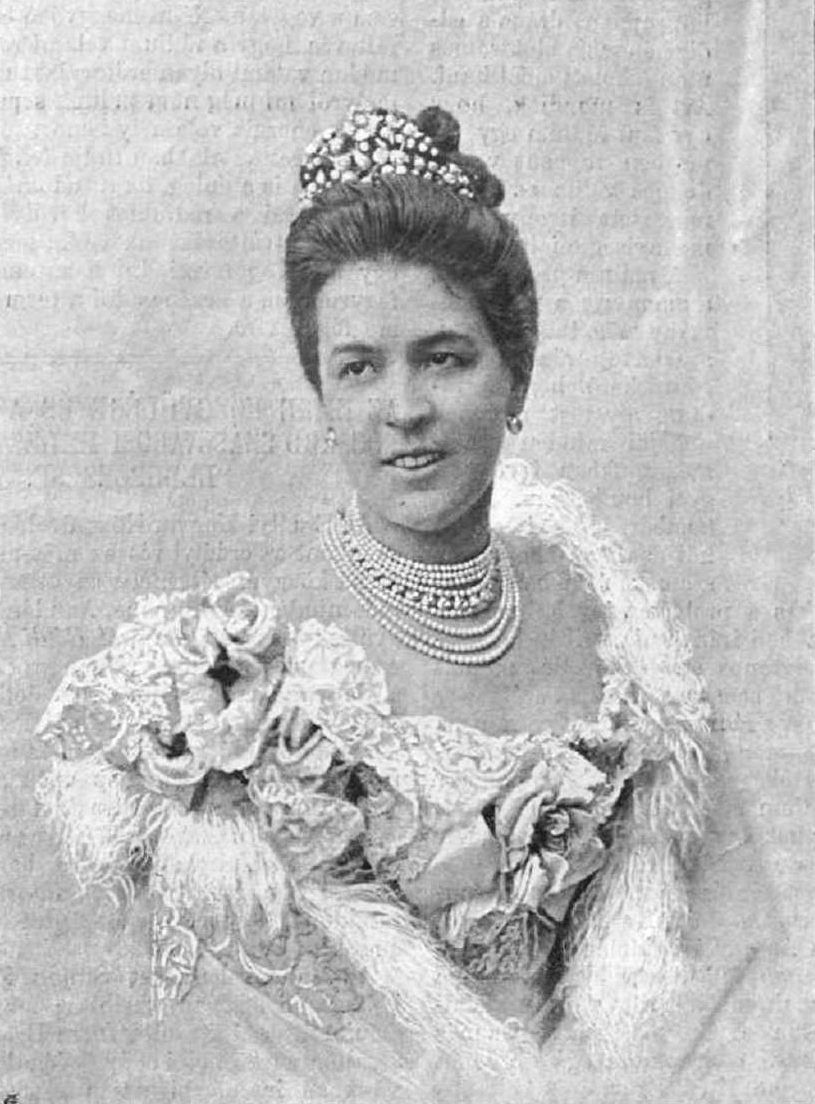
- Countess Teleki in 1903
- Full name: Countess Margit Teleki de Szék
- Born: 2 December 1860; Gyömrő, Kingdom of Hungary, Austrian Empire
- Died: 26 January 1922 (aged 61); Budapest, Kingdom of Hungary
- Noble family: House of Teleki
- Spouse: Count Károly Khuen-Héderváry de Hédervár
- Issue: Count Sándor Khuen-Héderváry; Count Károly Khuen-Héderváry Jr.
- Father: Count Sándor Teleki de Szék
- Mother: Countess Jozefina Teleki de Szék

Countess Margit Teleki de Szék (2 December 1860 – 26 January 1922) was a Hungarian noblewoman, wife of Prime Minister Károly Khuen-Héderváry.

== Family ==
She was born into a wealthy aristocratic Transylvanian family in 1860 as the third child of Sándor (1829–1875) and Jozefina Teleki (1838–1915). One of her brothers was József, a Member of Parliament.

Margit Teleki married Khuen-Héderváry on 6 September 1880. They had two children: Sándor (1881–1946) and Károly the Younger (1888–1960).

She died on 26 January 1922 in Budapest, four years after her husband's death.

== Sources ==
- Margit Teleki de Szék
- Vasárnapi Újság 1903/27
