= Dora Pejačević =

Croatian composer (1885–1923)

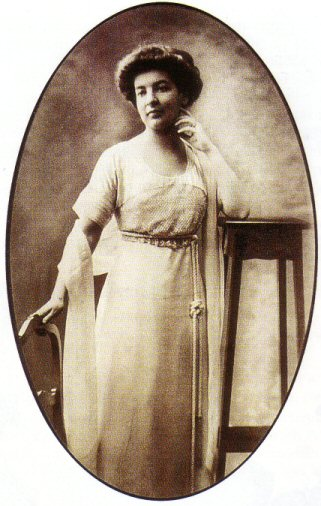
Portrait of Dora Pejačević

Countess Maria Theodora Paulina "Dora" Pejačević (Hungarian: Gróf verőczei Pejácsevich Mária Theodóra Paulina "Dóra"; 10 September 1885 – 5 March 1923) was a Croatian composer, pianist and violinist and one of the first composers to introduce the orchestral song to Croatian music. Her Symphony in F♯ minor is considered by scholars to be the first modern symphony in Croatian music. Pejačević is noted for her vocal compositions, piano miniatures, and string quartets, which were heavily influenced by the expressionist and modernist trends of the time.

In her early career, Pejačević’s primary themes were highly representative of the Romantic period, but this would change after her experience working as a paramedic in the First World War after which her works reflected the philosophic movement of nihilism and discussed motifs of death, isolation, and futility of war.

== Biography ==
=== Early life ===
Dora Pejačević (in old documents also Pejacsevich) was born in Budapest, Kingdom of Hungary, to a noble House of Pejačević. Her father, Teodor Pejačević of Virovitica, was a Croatian count with mostly magyar ancestors, and her mother, Elisabeth Josepha Vay de Vaya, a Hungarian noblewoman who was an educated singer and pianist. Her mother's prominence led to Dora veering towards music rather than the aristocratic lifestyle that was impressed upon her.

Pejačević and her family resided in their family castle in Našice, but they also spent much of her time in Vienna, Budapest, Prague, and Munich.

From a young age, Pejačević subscribed to numerous newspapers and magazines and had a keen interest in the social issues of her time. One example of this is her acute awareness of her noble privilege, which she addressed in one of her letters:

I don't understand how one can live without work... However, it's true that I don't align with members of my social class; in everything, I seek substance and value, and neither norms nor traditions nor lineage can blind me with sand in my eyes...

She developed her own intellectual abilities under the influences of Wilde, Ibsen, Dostoevsky, Mann, Schopenhauer, Rilke, Kierkegaard, Kraus, and Nietzsche, among others. In one of her diaries, she commented on 470 books she had read in the period from 1902 to 1921, which covered fields of literature, philosophy, music, religion, history, and natural sciences.

Pejačević composed her first known piece at the age of 12, after which she attended musical schools and academies in Zagreb, Dresden, and Munich. Pejačević remained mostly self-taught, however, as she never attended continuous courses, but rather occasional private lessons. Her artistic talent was primarily developed through her interactions with leading figures of her time such as the pianist Alice Ripper, artist Clara Rilke-Westhoff, writer Anette Kolb, Rainer Maria Rilke, Karl Kraus, and other prominent personalities of the European cultural scene.

=== Career ===
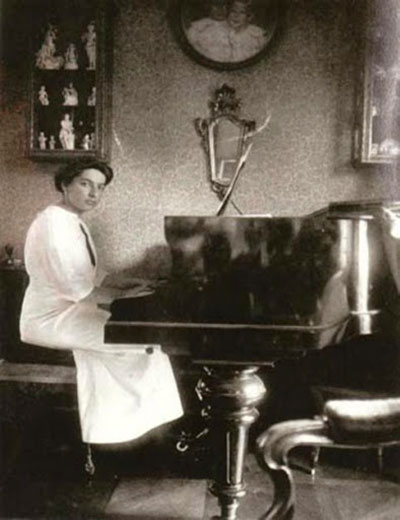
Pejačević sitting by her piano

In 1913, Pejačević composed a piano concerto, her first orchestral work, marking her as the first ever Croatian composer to write a concerto. Pejačević's earlier compositions mostly consisted of piano pieces, sonatas, and songs and were considered elite in their nature. She later replaced the romantic music of her youth with new musical expressions that corresponded to the time in which she lived - the turbulent war years and the revolutionary changes of the 1920s. These changes are evident in her music through impressionistic and expressionistic elements and harmonies.

The First World War, in which she herself participated as a paramedic, left numerous traces on her and her musical expression. She isolated herself and sought new compositional paths. The result of these efforts were cycles of solo compositions and vocal and orchestral compositions written to the verses of Karl Kraus, Rainer Maria Rilke, and Friedrich Nietzsche.

During this period, Pejačević described her work as follows:

In fact, I am only physically present. Everything I feel as living and experiencing floats above the present and the visible, and in a deep and beautiful infinity, I see in the mirror of my feelings the driving force in the form of beloved beings, and thousands of memories emerge like water lilies on the smooth surface of a lake. In this infinity, feelings are followed by thoughts, and there I contemplate my best, for all that is good and great grows from love. Soaring into that most invisible world of innermost being, I become completely my own self, and that self, which then feels too filled with itself in that distant heavenly seclusion, seeks expression, seeks relief from that high mental pressure, which is in itself a kind of enthusiasm - and that liberation is achieved when a composition is born!

Many of her pieces premiered in Germany, played by major soloists of the era. Throughout her lifetime, Pejačević's compositions were performed in Budapest, Vienna, Prague, Munich, Dresden, and her town of Našice.

=== Personal life and death ===
On 14 September 1921 she married Ottomar Otto, Ritter von Lumbe. The couple soon moved to Munich and had their first child, which proved to be fatal for Pejacevic. She died of puerperal sepsis after childbirth on March 5, 1923, at the Munich Clinic for Women's Diseases. In July 2011 in Vienna, her son, Theodor von Lumbem, presented the 1917 portrait of his mother - seated with violin - by Maksimilijan Vanka to the Gallery of Modern Art in Zagreb, Croatia.

A few months before her death, Pejačević wrote a letter to her spouse expressing a premonition of her death. A quote from her letter also speaks of her progressive worldviews and beliefs:

May God grant that our child (if I were to leave it to you) brings you joy - that they become a truly open, great human being; pave their paths, but never prevent them from experiencing the suffering that enriches the soul, for only then will they become a person. Let them develop like a plant, and if they possess great talent, provide them with everything that can serve their development; above all, give them freedom, wherever it may be required. For dependence on parents and relatives crushes many talents - I know this from my own experience - and therefore treat them equally, whether it be a girl or a boy.

Pejačević was temporarily buried in Munich and, after two months, her mortal remains were transferred to Našice. Before her death, she expressed the wish to rest in a separate grave, in the ground, outside the family tomb in the crypt of the Church of the Ascension of the Lord (Pejačević Family Chapel) in Našice, which the family had erected in 1881. She also wished her tombstone to have her name written solely as “Dora” with the short phrase "Rest Now".

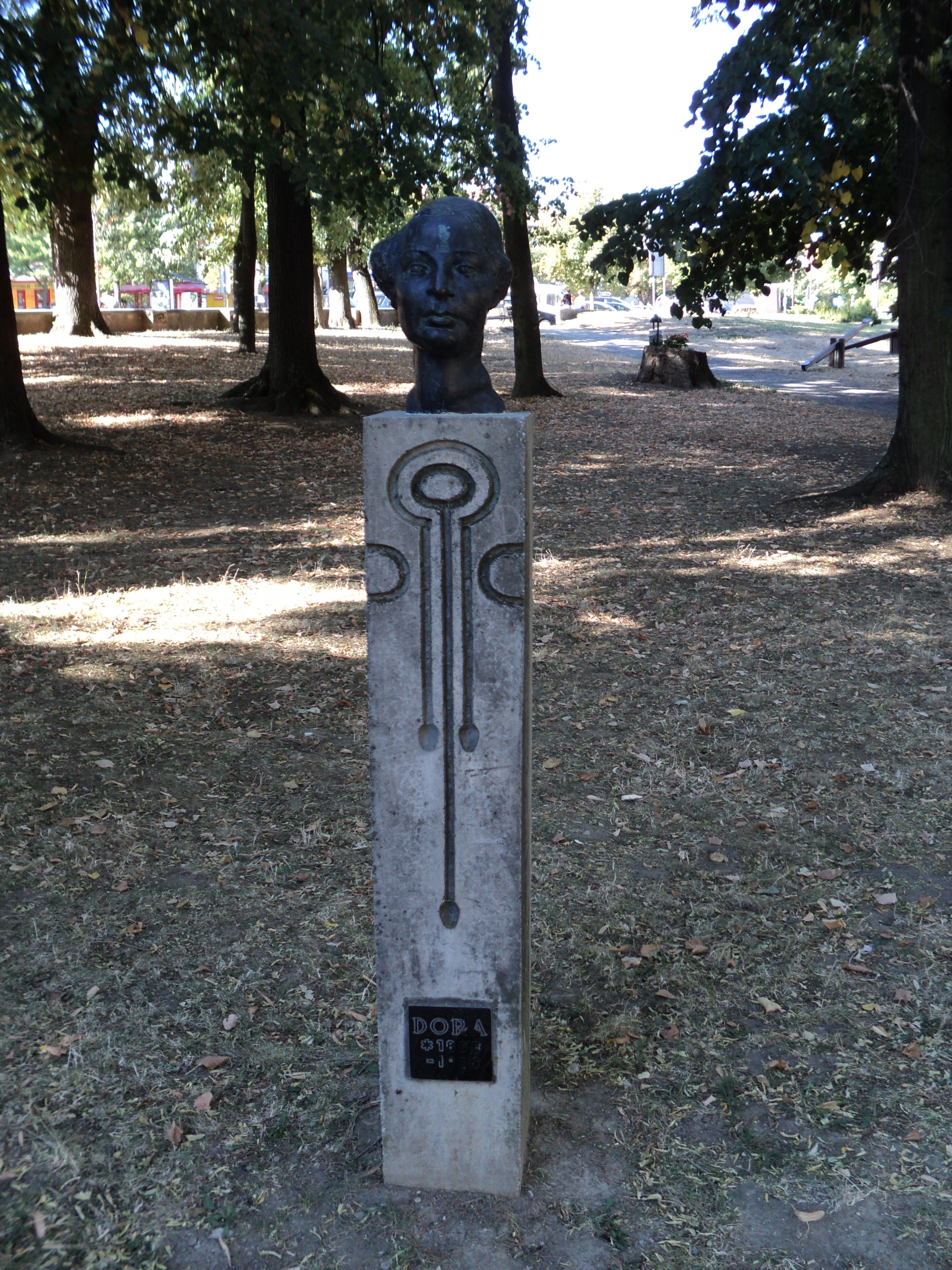
The bust of Dora Pejačević in Našice

== Legacy ==
Pejačević is considered a major Croatian composer. She left behind a considerable catalogue of 58 opuses (106 compositions), mostly in late Romantic style, including songs, piano works, chamber music, and several compositions for large orchestra. Her Symphony in F♯ minor is considered by scholars the first modern symphony in Croatian music. Most of her music has yet to be published and released on compact disc, although concerted efforts have been made recently to rectify this situation. For example, the Croatian Music Information Centre has published some of her scores, including three of her orchestral works (Piano Concerto, Symphony, and Phantasie Concertante). In 2008, the center also published a bilingual monograph (in English and Croatian), written by the Pejačević scholar Koraljka Kos, accompanied by a first all-Pejačević CD of piano and chamber music. The 2023 BBC Proms in London features a selection of her music, including the Symphony in F♯ minor

Her life is the subject of the fictionalized Croatian biographical film Countess Dora (1993), directed by Zvonimir Berković and starring Alma Prica and Rade Šerbedžija.

== List of works ==
=== Vocal compositions ===
Lieder

- "Ein Lied", Op. 11 (text: Paul Wilhelm; 1900)
- "Warum?", Op. 13 (text: Dora Pejačević; 1901)
- "Ave Maria", Op. 16, for voice, violin and organ, (1903)
- Sieben Lieder, Op. 23 (text: Wilhelmine von Wickenburg-Almasy; 1907; dedicated to Eva van Osten, Melanie Páiffy-Almásy, Julia Culp)
1. "Sicheres Merkmal"
2. "Es hat gleich einem Diebe"
3. "Taut erst Blauveilchen"
4. "Es jagen sich Mond und Sonne"
5. "Du bist der helle Frühlingsmorgen"
6. "In den Blättern wühlt"
7. "Es war einmal"
- Zwei Lieder, Op. 27 (Text: Wilhelmine von Wickenburg-Almasy; Ernst Strauss; 1909)
1. "Ich schleiche meine Straßen"
2. "Verweht"
- Vier Lieder, Op. 30 (Text: Anna Ritter; 1911; dedicated to Marianne Konradsheim)
1. "Ein Schrei"
2. "Wie ein Rausch"
3. "Ich glaub', lieber Schatz"
4. "Traumglück"
- Verwandlung for voice, violin and organ, Op. 37a (text: Karl Kraus; 1915; dedicated to Sidonie Nádherny von Borutin)
- Mädchengestalten, Op. 42 (text: Rainer Maria Rilke 1916)
1. "Als du mich einst gefunden hast"
2. "Viel Fähren sind auf den Flüssen"
3. "Ich bin eine Waise"
4. "Ich war ein Kind und träumte viel"
- "An eine Falte", Op. 46 (text: Karl Kraus; 1918; dedicated to Sidonie Nádherny von Borutin)
- Drei Gesänge, Op. 53 (text: Friedrich Nietzsche; 1919–1920)
1. "Venedig"
2. "Vereinsamt"
3. "Der Einsamste"
- Zwei Lieder, Op. 55 (Text: Karl Henckell; Ricarda Huch; 1920; dedicated to Rosa Lumbe-Mladota and Juza Lumbe)
1. "Zu dir!"
2. "Um bei dir zu sein"
- Tri dječje pjesme (Three children's songs), Op. 56 (text: Zmaj Jovan Jovanović; 1921)
1. "Majčica, moj anđeo" (Mommy, my angel)
2. "Dijete i baka" (Child and grandmother)
3. "Mali Radojica" (Little Radojica)

With orchestral accompaniment

- Verwandlung, Op. 37b (text: Karl Kraus; 1915)
- Liebeslied, Op. 39 (text: Rainer Maria Rilke; 1915)
- Zwei Schmetterlingslieder, Op. 52 (text: Karl Henckell; 1920)
1. "Goldne Sterne, blaue Glöckchen"
2. "Schwebe, du Schmetterling"

=== Compositions for solo piano ===
- Berceuse, Op. 2 (1897)
- Gondellied, Op. 4 (In Erinnerung an die gemütlichen Tage in Našice von Dora, Našice, 25 July 1898)
- Chanson sans paroles, Op. 5, (1898)
- Papillon, Op. 6 (1898)
- Menuette, Op. 7 (1898)
- Impromptu, Op. 9a (1899)
- Chanson sans paroles, Op. 10 (1900; dedicated to baroness Else Szentkereszty)
- Albumblatt, Op. 12 (1901; lost)
- Trauermarsch, Op. 14 (1902)
- Sechs Phantasiestücke, Op. 17 (1903)
1. "Sehnsucht"
2. "Leid"
3. "Frage"
4. "Klage"
5. "Bitte"
6. "Wahn" (2 versions: A and B)
- Blumenleben – acht Klavierstücke nach der Blütenzeit im Jahresablauf komponiert, Op. 19 (1904–1905)
1. "Schneeglöckchen"
2. "Veilchen"
3. "Maiglöckchen"
4. "Vergißmeinnicht"
5. "Rose"
6. "Rote Nelken"
7. "Lilien"
8. "Chrysanthemen"
- Berceuse, Op. 20 (1906; dedicated to her nephew, Count Nikola Pejačević)
- Valse de concert, Op. 21 (1906)
- Erinnerung, Op. 24 (1908; dedicated to Marie Therese Schall-Riaucour)
- Walzer-Capricen, Op. 28 (1910; dedicated to her professor Percy Sherwood)
1. "Moderato"
2. "Grazioso"
3. "Im Laendler-tempo"
4. "Wiegend"
5. "Lento"
6. "Tempo giusto"
7. "Allegretto"
8. "Grazioso, allegramente"
9. "Moderato"
- Vier Klavierstücke, Op. 32a (1912; dedicated to pianist Alice Ripper, who premiered them in Stockholm in 1917)
1. (lost)
2. "Libelle"
3. "Papillon"
4. "Abendgedanke"
- Vertige, Valse-Boston, (May 24, 1906; Romantic Salon Style)
- Impromptu, Op. 32b (1912; dedicated to pianist Alice Ripper)
- Sonata in B♭ minor, Op. 36 (1914; dedicated to Anny von Lange)
1. "Con fuoco non troppo allegro"
2. "Andante con molta espressione"
3. "Allegro risoluto"
- Zwei Intermezzi, Op. 38 (1915; dedicated to Olga Schulz-Granitz)
1. "Ruhig und innig"
2. "Langsam und ausdrucksvoll"
- Zwei Klavierskizzen, Op. 44 (1918; dedicated to Anny von Lange)
1. "An dich!"
2. "Vor deinem Bild"
- Blütenwirbel, Op. 45 (1918; 2 versions: A and B; dedicated to Sidonie Nádherny von Borutin)
- Capriccio, Op. 47 (1919; dedicated to pianist Alice Ripper)
- Zwei Nocturnos, Op. 50 (1918; 1920)
1. "Sehr ruhig, mit innigem Ausdruck" (Janowitz 20–21 Juli 1918; dedicated to pianist Alice Ripper)
2. "Leicht bewegt und ferträumt"
- Humoreske und Caprice, Op. 54 (1920)
1. "Humoreske", allegretto vivo
2. "Caprice", vivace grazioso
- Sonata in A♭ major, Op. 57 (in one movement; 1921)

=== Chamber compositions ===
- Rêverie for violin and piano, Op. 3 (1897)
- Canzonetta in D major, for violin and piano, Op. 8 (1899; her first printed composition; dedicated to Stefi Geyer)
- Impromptu, for piano quartet, Op. 9b (1903; arrangement of Op. 9a)
- Trio in D major, Op. 15 for violin, cello and piano (1902)
- Menuett in A major, Op. 18, for violin and piano (1904; dedicated to Jaroslav Kocian)
- Romanze in F major, Op. 22, for violin and piano (1907)
- Quartet in D minor, Op. 25 for violin, viola, cello and piano (1908)
- Sonata in D major, Frühlings-Sonate, Op. 26 for violin and piano (1909)
- Trio in C major, Op. 29 for violin, cello and piano (1910)
- String Quartet in F major, Op. 31 (1911; lost)
- Elegie in E♭ major for violin and piano, Op. 34 (1913; dedicated to Johannes Nádherny-Borutin)
- Sonata in E minor, Op. 35 for cello and piano (1913; dedicated to Olga and Ernst Schulz)
- Piano Quintet in B minor, Op. 40 for 2 violins, viola, violoncello and piano, (1915–1918)
- Sonata in B♭ minor Slawische Sonate for violin and piano, Op. 43 (1917; dedicated to violinist Zlatko Baloković)
- Méditation for violin and piano, Op. 51 (1919; dedicated to Viteszlav Novák)
- String Quartet in C major, Op. 58 (1922)

=== Orchestral compositions ===
- Piano Concerto in G minor, Op. 33 (1913)
- Symphony in F♯ minor for large orchestra, Op. 41 (1916 – 1917, rev. 1920; dedicated to her mother baroness Lilla Vay de Vaya)
- Phantasie concertante in D minor for piano and orchestra, Op. 48 (1919; dedicated to pianist Alice Ripper)
- Ouverture in D minor for large orchestra, Op. 49 (1919)

Songs for voice and orchestra (1915–1920)

- Verwandlung for voice, violin and orchestra, Op. 37b (text: Karl Kraus)
- Liebeslied, Op. 39, (text: Rainer Maria Rilke; dedicated to her sister Gabrielle Kochanovsky)
- Zwei Schmetterlingslieder, Op. 52 (text: Karl Henckell)
  - No. 1, "Gold'ne Sterne, blaue Glöckchen"
  - No. 2, "Schwebe du Schmetterling, schwebe vorbei"

== Recordings ==
- Symphony in F-sharp minor, Op. 41; Phantasie Concertante in D minor, Op. 48 for Piano & Orchestra (CPO CD#777-418-2)
- Piano Trio, Op. 29; Cello Sonata, Op. 35 (Oliver Triendl, Andrej Bielow, Christian Poltera. CPO 777-419-2)
- Piano Quintet, op.40; Piano Quartet, Op. 25; String Quartet, Op. 58; Impromptu, Op. 9 (Oliver Triendl, Quatuor Sine Nomine. CPO 777-421-2) [2 CDs]
- String Quartet in C major, Op. 58 together with String Sextet by Boris Papandopulo (CD #5558910)
- Violin Sonata No.1 in D major, Op. 26 together with works by Kunc, Boris Papandopulo and J. Š. Slavenski (CD #5872221)
- Lieder, Ein Lied, Op. 11; Warum, Op. 13; 7 Lieder, Op. 23; 2 Lieder, Op. 27; 4 Lieder, Op. 30; Verwandlung, Op. 37; Liebeslied, Op. 39; Mädchengestalten, Op. 42; An eine Falte, Op. 46; 2 Schmetterlingslieder, Op. 52; 3 Gesänge, Op. 53; 2 Lieder, Op. 55 (Ingeborg Danz, Cord Garben. CPO 777 422-2 (2012)
- Vertige, Valse-Boston (20th Century Foxtrots Volume 3. Catalogue Number GP854)
- Piano Concerto, Op. 33; Symphony, Op. 41; Peter Donohoe (piano), BBC Symphony Orchestra, conducted by Sakari Oramo, Chandos CHSA 5299 (2022)
- Dora Pejačević – Complete Works for Violin and Piano: Beyond the Conventions: Sonata for Violin and Piano in D Major, Op. 26 “Spring”; Sonata for Violin and Piano in B-flat Minor, Op. 43 “Sonata Slava”; Five Miniatures for Violin and Piano, Opp. 8, 18, 22, 34 & 51: Florangela D’Elia, violin & Antonio Nicolò Dispoto, piano (2026, Hunnia Records HRCD2617).

== In popular culture ==
- In the Croatian pseudo-biographical film Countess Dora (1993) she is portrayed by Alma Prica.
- Dora, a Croatian national selection for the Eurovision Song Contest, is named for Dora Pejačević.

== Bibliography ==
- Kos, Koraljka. Dora Pejačević. Zagreb: The Croatian Music Information Centre, 2008.
- Kos, Koraljka. Dora Pejačević: Leben und Werk. Zagreb: Musikinformationszentrum Konzertdirektion, 1987.
- Blevins, Pamela. "An Introduction to Croatian Composer Dora Pejačević". The Maud Powell Society
- "Ethel, Dora, & A Gent Named Ludwig". Piano By Nature, 18 April 2021
- "Dora Pejačević". Zentrum für Kunst Und Medien
