= Aleksandar Rakodczay =

Ban of Croatia from 1907 to 1908

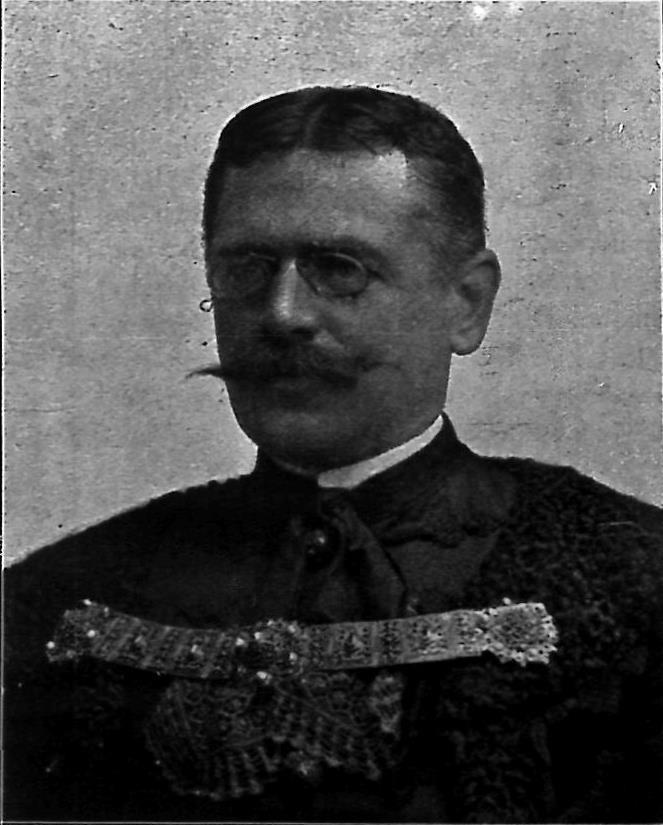

Ban of Croatia-Slavonia
- In office 26 June 1907 – 8 January 1908
- Preceded by: Teodor Pejačević
- Succeeded by: Pavao Rauch

Personal details
- Born: 25 September 1848 Bratislava, Kingdom of Hungary, Austrian Empire
- Died: 10 April 1924 (aged 75) Trenkovo, Sava Banovina, Kingdom of Yugoslavia

Aleksandar Rakodczay (25 September 1848 – 10 April 1924) was a Croatian politician who served as Ban of Croatia-Slavonia between 1907 and 1908. Originating from the Hungarian family with properties in Hrvatsko Zagorje. After studying law in Hungary, from 1873. He was an intern at the Croatian ministry in Budapest, from 1874. Judge in Sombor, Baji and great Kikinda, and from 1884. Assistant clerk at the Royal table in Budapest. As. 1885. At the invitation of the Croatian ban K. Khuen-Héderváry, he came to Zagreb in the position of the main state attorney and was 1886. Became Judge of the table of Seven. From 1893. He was President of the judgment table, then Vice President (from 1898), and president of the Tabula Banalis (from 1905) in Zagreb. With his arrival to the Banic honour, after the resignation of T. Pejačević in 1907, the New Course Policy in Croatia has suffered its final breakdown. After withdrawing from the place Bana 1908. was appointed President of the Table of Seven (up to 1912).

Political offices
Preceded by Teodor Pejačević	Ban of Croatia-Slavonia; 1907–1908	Succeeded by Pavao Rauch
