= Countess Dora =

- Croatian poster for the film
- Directed by: Zvonimir Berković
- Written by: Zvonimir Berković
- Starring: Alma Prica; Rade Šerbedžija
- Cinematography: Goran Trbuljak
- Edited by: Maja Rodica Virag
- Music by: Dora Pejačević; Igor Kuljerić
- Production companies: Croatia Film; Croatian Radiotelevision
- Release date: 1993
- Running time: 117 minutes
- Country: Croatia
- Language: Croatian

Countess Dora (Croatian: Kontesa Dora) is a Croatian pseudo-biographical film about Croatian composer Dora Pejačević. Filmed in 1990, it was released in public in 1993. It was written and directed by Zvonimir Berković. It was Croatia's submission to the 66th Academy Awards for the Academy Award for Best Foreign Language Film, but was not accepted as a nominee.

== Plot ==
Karlo Armano, a cabaret entertainer and film aficionado, meets countess Dora Pejačević in Zagreb. The two become close, and after a while Armano visits her at her estate in Slavonia hoping to spur the countess' romantic interest in him, but also to find a well-to-do patron for his film endeavors...

== Cast ==
- Alma Prica as Countess Dora Pejačević
- Rade Šerbedžija as Karlo Armano
- Irina Alfyorova as Sidonija Nadherny
- Relja Bašić as Izidor Kršnjavi
- Božidar Boban as Hugo pl. Mihalović
- Helena Buljan as Didi
- Eliza Gerner as Landlady
- Ivo Gregurević as Maksimilijan Vanka
- Zdravka Krstulović as Lilla
- Tonko Lonza as Count Teodor Pejačević
- Jadranka Matković as Hysterical Woman
- Mustafa Nadarević as Tuna the Driver
- Dubravka Ostojić
- Ksenija Pajić as Stefi Geyer

== See also ==
- Cinema of Croatia
- List of submissions to the 66th Academy Awards for Best Foreign Language Film
- List of Croatian submissions for the Academy Award for Best Foreign Language Film
