= Vitomir Belaj =

Croatian ethnologist (1937–2023)

Vitomir Belaj (November 8, 1937 – August 19, 2023) was a Croatian ethnologist. In 1979 he received his PhD at Faculty of Humanities and Social Sciences, University of Zagreb. There was a professor since 1985, and since 2009 as emeritus professor. In his career, Belaj particularly studied ethnological history and mythological background of Slavs and Croats.

Belaj died on August 19, 2023, at the age of 85.

== Selected works ==
- Utemeljitelj hrvatske etnologije dr. Antun Radić (1966) (master's thesis)
- Kultni vrtići u Jugoslaviji i njihov etnološki okvir (1979) (doctoral dissertation)
- Die Kunde vom kroatischen Volk. Eine Kulturgeschichte der kroatischen Volkskunde (1998) ISBN 3928624571
- Hod kroz godinu. Mitska pozadina hrvatskih narodnih običaja i vjerovanja (1998, 2007) ISBN 9789532123340
- Sveti trokuti. Topografija hrvatske mitologije (with Juraj Belaj; 2014) ISBN 978-953-6927-74-6

== Awards ==
- 1998: Croatian State Award in Science (hr:Državna nagrada za znanost)
- 2006: Milovan Gavazzi Award for lifetime achievement, Croatian Ethnographic Society
