= Teodor Pejačević =

Ban of Croatia from 1903 to 1907

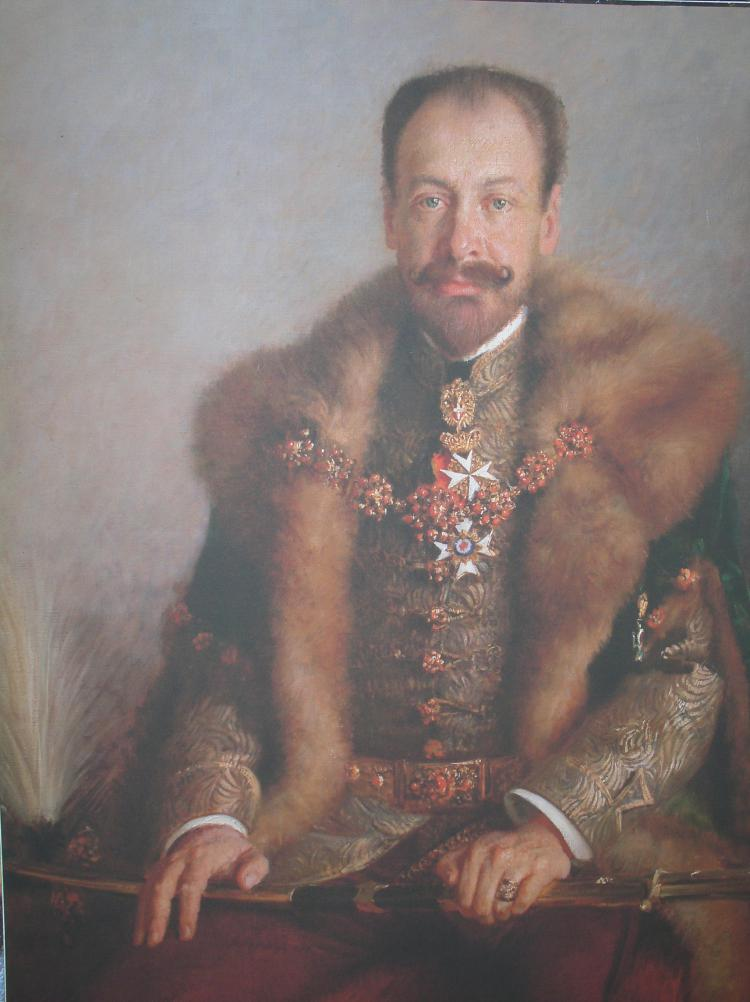
- Vlaho Bukovac, Portrait of ban Teodor Pejačević, 1903, Gallery of Fine Arts, Osijek

Ban of Croatia-Slavonia
- In office 1 July 1903 – 26 June 1907
- Preceded by: Károly Khuen-Héderváry
- Succeeded by: Aleksandar Rakodczay

Minister of Croatian Affairs of Hungary
- In office 21 July 1913 – 16 January 1916
- Preceded by: István Tisza
- Succeeded by: István Tisza

Personal details
- Born: 24 September 1855 Našice, Kingdom of Slavonia, Austrian Empire
- Died: 22 July 1928 (aged 72) Vienna, Austria
- Party: Unionist Party
- Other political affiliations: Croat-Serb Coalition
- Spouse: Elizabeta Vay de Vaya
- Profession: Politician, lawyer

Count Teodor Pejačević of Virovitica (24 September 1855 – 22 July 1928) was a Croatian politician, member of Pejačević family, who served as Ban of Croatia-Slavonia between 1903 and 1907.

He was born in Našice as the eldest son of Ladislav Pejačević, a Ban of Croatia (1880–1883). His mother was the Hungarian baroness Gabrijela /Gabrielle/ Döry de Jobaháza.

He served as a long-term župan of Virovitica County.

At the beginning of the 20th century, he was faced with a new direction of Croatian policy marked by political alliance between Croats and Serbs in Austria-Hungary for mutual benefit. A Croat-Serb Coalition was formed in 1905 and it governed the Croatian lands from 1906 until the dissolution of the Dual Monarchy in 1918. As Pejačević supported the ruling Coalition in its resistance towards the Hungarian quest in 1907 to introduce the Hungarian language to be the official language on railways in Croatia, he was forced to resign.

He also took part as the Minister for Croatia, Slavonia and Dalmatia in the Hungarian Government from 1913 to 1916. However, during World War I he was interned in France on 22 August 1914. After that he was substituted by the Prime Minister István Tisza.

Pejačević died in Vienna. Among his children, the best known is his daughter Dora, a Croatian composer.

In Croatian film Countess Dora (1993) he is played by Tonko Lonza.

Political offices
Preceded by Károly Khuen-Héderváry	Ban of Croatia-Slavonia; 1903–1907	Succeeded by Aleksandar Rakodczay
Preceded by István Tisza	Minister of Croatian Affairs; 1913–1916	Succeeded by István Tisza
