= Károly Khuen-Héderváry =

Hungarian politician (1849–1918)

Count Károly Khuen-Héderváry de Hédervár
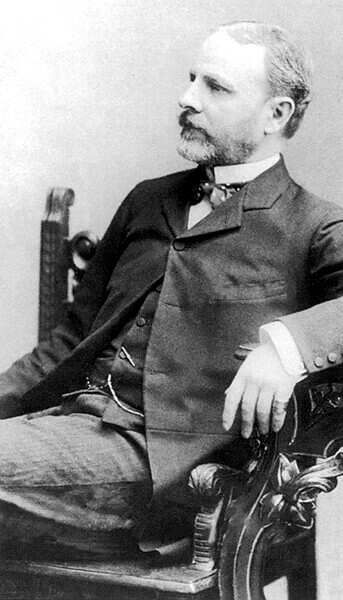

Prime Minister of the Kingdom of Hungary
- In office 27 June – 3 November 1903
- Monarch: Francis Joseph I
- Preceded by: Kálmán Széll
- Succeeded by: István Tisza
- In office 17 January 1910 – 22 April 1912
- Monarch: Francis Joseph I
- Preceded by: Sándor Wekerle
- Succeeded by: László Lukács

Ban of Croatia-Slavonia
- In office 4 December 1883 – 27 June 1903
- Preceded by: Hermann Ramberg
- Succeeded by: Teodor Pejačević

Personal details
- Born: Károly Khuen de Belás; 23 May 1849 Gräfenberg, Austrian Empire (today Lázně Jeseník, Czech Republic)
- Died: 16 February 1918 (aged 68) Budapest, Hungary, Austria-Hungary
- Spouse: Countess Margit Teleki (born Margit Teleki de Szék)
- Children: Sándor; Károly

Ban Count Károly Khuen-Héderváry de Hédervár, born as Károly Khuen de Belás (English: Charles Khuen-Héderváry; Croatian: Dragutin Khuen-Héderváry; 23 May 1849 – 16 February 1918) was a Hungarian politician and the ban of the Kingdom of Croatia-Slavonia in the late nineteenth century. Khuen's reign was marked by a strong magyarization. After a series of riots broke out against him in 1903, Khuen was relieved of his duty and appointed prime minister of Hungary.

== Background ==
Born in Bad Gräfenberg, Austrian Silesia, Károly Khuen de Belás was the oldest son of seven siblings born to Hungarian magnate Antal Khuen de Belás (1817–1886) and his wife, Baroness Angelika Izdenczi de Monostor et Komlós (1823–1894):

- Alice (1850–1879), wife of Count Zsigmond Zichy de Zich et Vásonykeö, an Imperial and Royal Chamberlain, Lieutenant, they married 8 January 1877
- Antal (1852–1890), Imperial and Royal Chamberlain, member of the Sabor, prominent architect
- Angelika (1855–1918), wife of Count Albert von Lodron-Laterano und Castelromano since 1887
- Margit (1856–1920), wife of Baron Tibor Vay de Vaya
- Henrik (1860–1928), Imperial and Royal Chamberlain, Lieutenant at the Cavalry Guard, husband of Countess Johanna von und zu Eltz genannt Faust von Stromberg
- Szabina (1863–1942), wife of Count János Woracziczky von Babienitz since 1883.

His three other siblings died when they were children. He spent most of his childhood at the family estate in Nuštar in Kingdom of Croatia-Slavonia.

According to the last Count Viczay de Loós et Hédervár, Héder Viczay's will, and the Court's supreme decision (dated Vienna, on 5 December 1874), Károly was granted the bearing Khuen-Héderváry name and title of Count. He changed his title from Belási to Hédervári and his new coat of arms was compiled by the two families' coat of arms. His maternal grandmother was Karolina Viczay, Héder's aunt. In addition Héder's brother, Károly Viczay (1802–1867) married to Mária Khuen (1811–1848), Károly Khuen-Héderváry's aunt. Khuen-Héderváry married Countess Margit Teleki de Szék on 6 September 1880. They had two children: Sándor (1881–1946) and Károly the Younger (1888–1960).

== Political career ==
=== Ban of Croatia-Slavonia ===
Károly Khuen-Héderváry became ban of the Kingdom of Croatia-Slavonia in 1883, succeeding the temporary reign of Ban Hermann Ramberg. This followed the unrest and disorder that happened because of Hungary's non-compliance with the Croatian–Hungarian Settlement (e.g. bilingual coat of arms were put on public buildings and the Hungarian language was unofficially introduced into the public service, i.e. the clerks were obliged to know it in order to get/keep the job). Emperor Franz Joseph I appointed him to the position in order to obstruct strong Croatian resistance to dualism established by the Austro-Hungarian Compromise of 1867 thus preserving the Austrian sovereignty and Empire from possible breakdown. The almost 20-year long Khuen-Héderváry's reign became referred to in Croatia as "khuenovština", meaning the type of governance characterized by political arbitrariness, violence, persecution of opponents and corruption.

The basic task of Khuen-Héderváry was to carry out a policy consistent with Emperor Franz Joseph's demands, not wanting to touch into empires' dualism. Thus, Khuen-Hédérvary consistently prevented Croats from achieving greater autonomy. His influence over Croatian politics was accomplished with the help of the pro-unitarian People's Party, with whom he gained the majority of seats in the Croatian Parliament at the 1884 parliamentary election. Khuen-Héderváry's efforts to maintain political power were greatly supported by the Serbs, in particular, members of the Serbian caucus in the Croatian Parliament, who were colloquially called "Khuen's Serbs". He supported the Serbian institutions and elite and its disproportionately strong influence in Croatian politics and economy. In 1884 he passed a set of "Serbian" laws, extended in 1887, by which the position of the Serbian Orthodox Church and Serbs in Croatia-Slavonia was arranged. During Khuen-Héderváry's reign, four out of eight prefects of Croatian counties, the deputy ban and the speaker of the parliament were Serbs, and Serbs occupied the highest ranks in the judiciary. Due to his close cooperation with Serbs, he was sometimes known as the "Serbian ban". The main goal of favouring the Serbs was to encourage inter-ethnic (Croat/Serb) conflicts which would lead to the preventing of resistance against the Empires' state policies.

Between 1885 and 1887, he reorganized the Croatian judiciary and administration by placing them under the ban's authority. The freedom of public expression and press were considerably reduced. On 5 February 1886, following his initiative, the Parliament enacted the Law on Organization of Counties and the Administration in Counties and Districts (Zakon o ustroju županija i uređenju uprave u županijah i kotarih). According to this law, Croatia was divided into eight counties, each of them governed by a prefect, all of them being politically loyal to Khuen-Héderváry, who had great authority. That is how Khuen-Héderváry wanted to strengthen his power and control over the Kingdom. After two years, in 1888, he confirmed a new electoral law according to which only the richest (2% of the population) had the right to vote. Women did not have the right to vote, and voting rights were determined by property and tax censuses. The Law granted foreign officials working in Croatian state institutions, who were mostly Hungarians, the right to vote. The elections were held under the police supervision and slogan "Keeping Order and Peace" which added to the atmosphere of constant pressure, while the authorities did not hesitate to use force so that even murders were happening. He tried to erase the Croatian name and encouraged the use of provincial names (like Slavonian; he himself identified as such) in order to diminish the national consciousness and had attributed the concept of Croatian to something that was, according to him, "provincial". Such a policy was attributed by some to the personal interests he had with wealthy non-Croat Slavonians, which brought Croats as the capital holders to a disadvantageous position. Throughout his reign, he has been implementing measures that would have led to the conversion of Croatia and Slavonia into the Hungarian province.

Khuen-Héderváry constantly pressured the Yugoslav Academy of Sciences and Arts and the University of Zagreb and made it difficult for them to work. In 1894, he introduced the Hungarian language as an obligatory subject in all Croatian gymnasiums and provided the opportunity for the establishment of Hungarian schools. Such a provision supported the magyarization of the population which he had violently carried out. Since he came to power, he tried to prevent the construction of a new building of the Croatian National Theatre in Zagreb in all possible ways. He questioned project's way of funding and the location (he proposed land near the Zagreb Glavni kolodvor). In spite of his initial views, he realized that the construction of the theater would have shown the emperor that Croatian nationalism waned and that he managed to "calm" the Kingdom. Therefore, on 5 January 1894, he signed a contract on the construction of a new theater building with Fellner & Helmer and even determined a better location than the one required by the city government (they wanted the theatre to be located in Ilica and Khuen placed it in the city center). On 14 October 1895, the newly constructed building was opened. The Emperor himself attended the ceremony. On that day, groups of pupils and students held protests during which they burned the Hungarian flag beneath Josip Jelačić's monument. The protests were violently suppressed, and protesters expelled from schools. Although the gendarmerie under the Khuen-Héderváry's command had tried to violently suppress protests, the situation soon came out of control and protesters reached the Emperor which made him realize that the situation in the Kingdom was still extremely unstable.

Regardless of Khuen-Héderváry's harsh rule, Croatian economy experienced a slight growth due to Izidor Kršnjavi and Josip Juraj Strossmayer's activities. Many banks, insurance companies, and agricultural associations were founded throughout the Kingdom. The industry was developing as well with various factories, such as Franck and Drava - Osijek, being opened. By increasing agricultural production, steam mills (one, Hinko in Nuštar, was founded by Khuen-Héderváry's brother Heinrich II), breweries and factories were established. The electrification of Croatia slowly started; larger cities got public lighting, and public and economic buildings were lighted as well so they that could work at night. There was also a sudden development of the railway system. With the help of the Mortgage Bank founded in 1893 in Zagreb, Khuen-Héderváry encouraged the construction of railways under the Hungarian State Railways and popularized the slogan: "Who owns the railways, owns the country!" Nevertheless, during his reign, Croatia experienced a rapid increase in overseas migration which was the result of population growth and slow industrialization. There was dissatisfaction with the financial dependence of Croatia on Hungary, financial independence was demanded, and when the Hungarian Parliament rejected the request for improvement of financial conditions in Croatia in 1903, a public assembly was organized in Zagreb. Other Croatian cities also held public assemblies, but Khuen-Héderváry banned them. There were protests against such a decision in Osijek, Zagreb and many other cities. The consequences of the unrest that affected the Kingdom were the introduction of courts martial in some parts and the imprisonment of a large number of Croats.

Due to growing pressure of Hungarians on the Croatians and the placing of Hungarian flags and coats of arms in Hungarian on the railway station, a series of riots across the Kingdom broke out in 1903. The most intense was the one held in Zaprešić on which police officers shoot peasants who dissatisfied with the ban's behaviour burnt the Hungarian flag and smashed all the windows on the local railway station building. People's Movement and the political crisis in Hungary marked the end of his reign. When the Emperor realized that Khuen Héderváry no longer had any influence in Croatia, he removed him from office and appointed him on 23 June 1903 to the position of Prime Minister of Hungary. Nevertheless, he continued to interfere in Croatian state affairs and has helped Nikola Tomašić to become Croatian Ban. At the beginning of the World War I, he stated that the idea of creation of Yugoslavia from the Croatian point of view was inappropriate due to the Serb question and that the solution for Bosnia and Herzegovina's status was in its annexation to Hungary.

=== Prime Minister (1903) ===
At the elections of 1901 the Liberal Party had obtained a considerable majority, and Prime Minister Kálmán Széll formed a government. He faced the greatest difficulty on 16 October 1902, when the Minister of Defence, Géza Fejérváry tabled a bill in the House of Representatives about the conscription of 20 thousands reservists. Against this proposal of the defence minister, the opposition, led by the Independence Party, launched an endless obstruction under the slogan of "no more soldiers without the introduction of Hungarian as the language service and command".

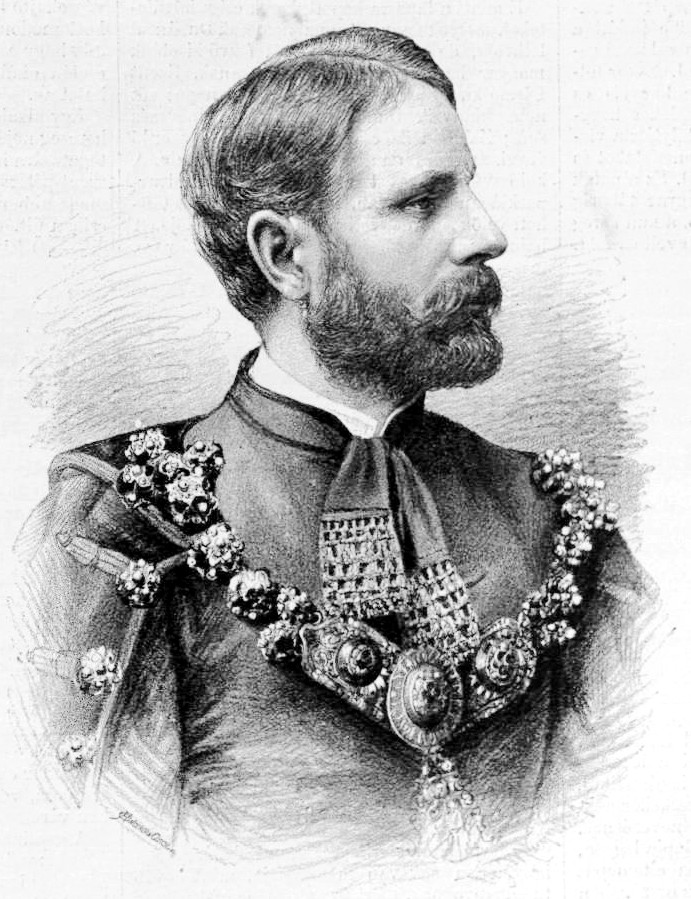
Khuen-Héderváry in 1894

In the face of opposition, which paralysed the work of the parliament, the Széll government proved impotent. On 23 May 1903, King Francis Joseph authorised Károly Khuen-Héderváry, ban of Croatia, to initiate negotiations among the Hungarian politicians about the prospects of forming a new government.

The ban, who had no immediate knowledge of the political conditions at Budapest, briefly acquainted himself with the situation and resigned his commission as he saw his situation utterly hopeless. Consequently, the ruler asked István Tisza on 16 June to agree as future prime minister with the politicians of the Liberal Party about the composition of the government. But the members of the governing party, fearing that Tisza would eventually break down the obstruction with violent means, refused to assume the ministerial posts offered to them one after the other.

In aftermath of Tisza's failed efforts to form a government, king withdrew Széll's commission and asked Khuen-Héderváry to start new initiative to form government in Budapest but this time it should be accompanied by negotiations between broader political fractions. To successfully fulfil the king's expectations, Khuen-Héderváry made a favorable political deal with Independence Party by promising their leaders that he would drop Fejérváry's new conscripting proposition and support the bill for enlisting only a regular number of yearly recruits, if they agreed to support to his government and end obstruction to form new government. Soon after the new Khuen-Héderváry cabinet was appointed on 27 June 1903, they realized at the time of its introduction at parliament that a great part of the opposition representatives would continue their obstruction and make parliamentary work impossible.

The situation of the prime minister further deteriorated after the session of parliament on 29 July, when representatives of the Independence Party announced that László Szapáry, Governor of Fiume, who belonged to the friends of Khuen-Héderváry, had tried to bribe deputies belonging to the opposition into suspending their obstruction. Although no direct evidence was found against the prime minister in the case of bribery, the ensuing scandal made even those opposition representatives return to the camp of obstruction who had so far respected their agreement with Khuen-Héderváry. The latter, who saw no way out of the crisis, handed in his resignation, which was accepted by the monarch on 7 August. Three days later the parliament took cognizance of the government's departure from office.

=== Prime Minister (1910–1912) ===
He also served as Prime Minister of Hungary from 1910 to 1912, before World War I: following the downfall of the Coalition (Wekerle II) government, Francis Joseph appointed the first minority government of Hungary in 1910, once again under the leadership of Count Khuen-Héderváry. (The government of Fejérváry cannot be considered a minority government because at its inception it declared itself a government of civil servants and not legitimised by the House of Representatives.) The minority government was tolerated by all the parties as a temporary solution. To their own surprise, the new governing party (Party of National Work), mostly formed of former Liberal Party members, won the elections a few months later with a vast majority, receiving 62 percent of the mandates.

A serious clash between the parties in the House of Representatives was brought about again by the defense proposal. Khuen-Héderváry could handle the opposition's filibuster for almost a year from May 1911, but he did not manage to find an intermediate position between the opposition and the monarch. The fight among the parties was aggravated by the fact that one of the '48er parties, led by Gyula Justh, decided to give their absolute support to the Hungarian Social Democratic Party (MSZDP) on the issue of a universal suffrage. It was, however, unacceptable for the majority of the government party. The King appointed László Lukács Prime Minister in April 1912 in order to ensure a stronger government activity (and a stronger governing party) in the lower house, while István Tisza, the real leader of the party, became Speaker of the House.

== Later life ==
In 1913 he was appointed chairman of the Party of National Work. He became an honorary member of the Hungarian Academy of Sciences in 1915. He served as leader of the Hungarian delegation to the common legislation from 1917. He was also president of the Hungarian Mortgage Credit Bank. He died on 16 February 1918 in Budapest at the age of 68.

== Honours ==
=== Civil appointments ===
- Privy Councillor, 1883

=== Orders and decorations ===
- Austria-Hungary:
  - Knight of the Iron Crown, 1st Class, 1885
  - Knight of the Golden Fleece, 1891
  - Grand Cross of St. Stephen, 1910
  - Jubilee Medal for Civil State Servants
- Belgium: Grand Cordon of the Order of Leopold
- Persian Empire: Order of the Lion and the Sun, 1st Class
- Kingdom of Romania: Grand Cross of the Star of Romania
- Kingdom of Serbia: Grand Cross of the White Eagle
- German Empire: Knight of Merit of the Prussian Crown, 19 September 1903
  - Hohenzollern: Cross of Honour of the Princely House Order of Hohenzollern, 1st Class
  - Saxony: Grand Cross of the Albert Order

== Sources ==
- Ćirković, Sima (2004). The Serbs. Malden: Blackwell Publishing. ISBN 9781405142915.
- Miller, Nicholas J. (1997). Between Nation and State: Serbian Politics in Croatia Before the First World War. Pittsburgh: University of Pittsburgh Press. ISBN 9780822977223.
- Hungary: Governments and Politics 1848–2000 (ed. Mária ORMOS – Béla K. KIRÁLY). Columbia University Press, New York, 2001. p. 132.

Political offices
Preceded by Hermann Ramberg	Ban of Croatia-Slavonia; 1883–1903	Succeeded by Teodor Pejačević
Preceded by Kálmán Széll	Prime Minister of Hungary; 1903	Succeeded by István Tisza
Preceded by Kálmán Széll	Minister of the Interior; 1903	Succeeded by István Tisza
Preceded by Gyula Széchényi	Minister besides the King; 1903	Succeeded by István Tisza
Preceded by István Tisza	Minister besides the King; 1904–1905	Succeeded by Géza Fejérváry
Preceded by Sándor Wekerle	Prime Minister of Hungary; 1910–1912	Succeeded by László Lukács
Preceded by Gyula Andrássy the Younger	Minister of the Interior; 1910–1912	Succeeded by László Lukács
Preceded by Aladár Zichy	Minister besides the King; 1910–1912	Succeeded by László Lukács
Preceded by Gejza Josipović	Minister of Croatian Affairs; Acting; 1910	Succeeded by Gejza Josipović
