= Gejza Josipović =

Croatian politician (1857–1934)

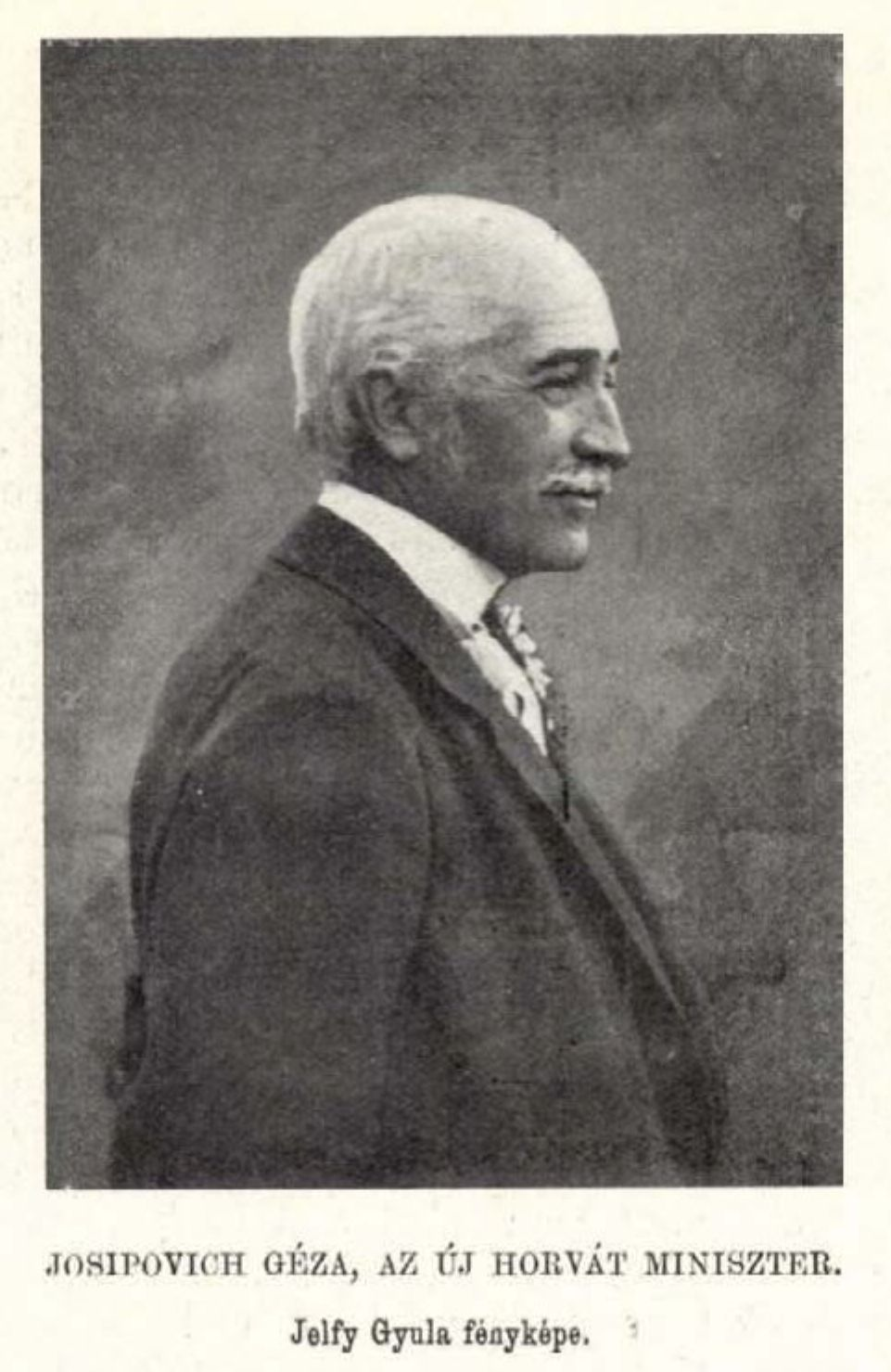

Minister of Croatian Affairs of Hungary
- In office 23 April 1906 – 17 January 1910
- Preceded by: Sándor Wekerle
- Succeeded by: Károly Khuen-Héderváry
- In office 22 April 1912 – 10 June 1913
- Prime Minister: László Lukács
- Preceded by: Károly Khuen-Héderváry
- Succeeded by: István Tisza

Personal details
- Born: 31 January 1857 Jalkovec, Croatia-Slavonia, Austrian Empire
- Died: 20 May 1934 (aged 77) Budapest, Kingdom of Hungary
- Party: Unionist Party
- Profession: politician

Gejza Josipović (Hungarian: Géza Josipovich; 31 January 1857 – 20 May 1934) was a Croatian politician of the Unionist Party who served as Minister without portfolio of Croatian Affairs twice: between 1906–1910 and between 1912–1913. His father was Emerik Josipović, who also served in this position. Gejza graduated in the Budapest University's Faculty of Law. He participated in the occupation of Bosnia and Herzegovina. In 1887, he became a member of the Croatian Parliament. After the Treaty of Trianon, he lived in Hungary.

Political offices
Preceded by Sándor Wekerle	Minister of Croatian Affairs; 1906–1910	Succeeded by Károly Khuen-Héderváry
Preceded by Károly Khuen-Héderváry	Minister of Croatian Affairs; 1912–1913	Succeeded by István Tisza
