= Ervin Cseh =

Hungarian politician

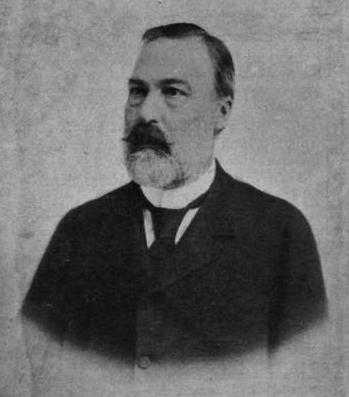

Minister of Croatian Affairs of Hungary
- In office 10 December 1898 – 27 June 1903
- Prime Minister: Dezső Bánffy; Kálmán Széll
- Preceded by: Emerik Josipović
- Succeeded by: Nikola Tomašić
- In office 3 November 1903 – 18 June 1905
- Prime Minister: István Tisza
- Preceded by: Nikola Tomašić
- Succeeded by: Stjepan Kovačević

Personal details
- Born: 23 March 1838 Valpovo, Kingdom of Slavonia, Austrian Empire
- Died: 12 June 1918 (aged 80) Erdut, Croatia-Slavonia, Austria-Hungary
- Party: Independent
- Profession: politician

Ervin Cseh (23 March 1838 – 12 June 1918) was a Hungarian politician from Slavonia, who served as Minister without portfolio of Croatian Affairs twice: between 1898 and 1903 and between 1903 and 1905. As leader of Srijem County he succeeded to reconcile the Serbs and the Croatians. He was a representative in the Parliament of Croatia beside his ministry. At the time of Mozaffar al-Din Shah Qajar, the Persian shah's visit in Budapest besides many people he was also favoured with the Order of the Lion and the Sun. Cseh also hold his position in the next government, but he had to leave when Kálmán Széll resigned in 1903. After Károly Khuen-Héderváry's unsuccessful forming of a government he returned to the ministerial seat. In 1905 he retired from the politics.

Political offices
Preceded by Emerik Josipović	Minister of Croatian Affairs; 1898–1903	Succeeded by Nikola Tomašić
Preceded by Nikola Tomašić	Minister of Croatian Affairs; 1903–1905	Succeeded by Stjepan Kovačević
