= Beöthy =

Beöthy is a Hungarian surname. Notable people with this surname include:

- István Beöthy (1897–1961), Hungarian-French sculptor and architect
- László Beöthy (1873–1931), Hungarian theater director and journalist
- Ödön Beöthy (1796–1854), Hungarian deputy and orator
- Pál Beőthy (1866–1921), Hungarian jurist, soldier, and politician
- Zsigmond Beöthy (1819–1896), Hungarian poet, writer, judge, and jurist
- Zsolt Beöthy (1848–1922), Hungarian literary historian, critic, and professor
