= Károly Unkelhäusser =

Hungarian politician

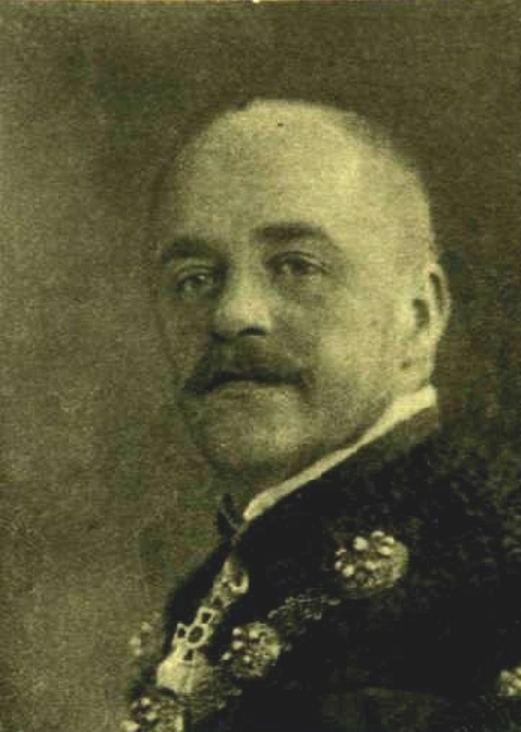

Minister of Croatian Affairs of Hungary
- In office 18 August 1917 – 31 October 1918
- Preceded by: Aladár Zichy
- Succeeded by: Zsigmond Kunfi

Personal details
- Born: 15 January 1866; Vukovar, Kingdom of Slavonia, Austrian Empire
- Died: 20 February 1938 (aged 72); Budapest, Kingdom of Hungary
- Political party: Independent
- Profession: politician

Károly Unkelhäusser (15 January 1866 in Vukovar – 20 February 1938) was a Hungarian politician who served as Minister without portfolio of Croatian Affairs between 1917 and 1918. From 20 December 1912 he substituted Slavko Cuvaj until the ban's definitive replacement. He was the substitute of the province chief of Bosnia and Herzegovina between 1915 and 1917, but he left this position for the Croatian Affairs ministerial post. He was deprived of his function as a result of the Aster Revolution.

From 2 November he served as designated Ban of Croatia. His commission was in order to proclaim Dalmatia's, Bosnia and Herzegovina's and Croatia's union inside the Kingdom of Hungary's frameworks. But was too late already. These territories were united, though under the aegis of the Kingdom of Serbs, Croats, and Slovenes (later Kingdom of Yugoslavia) which created newly. It was not the turn of his actual ban appointment already since, because of the function ceased with the disintegration of the Austro-Hungarian Monarchy.

Political offices
Preceded by Aladár Zichy	Minister of Croatian Affairs; 1917–1918	Succeeded by Zsigmond Kunfi
