= Emerik Josipović =

Croatian politician (1834–1910)

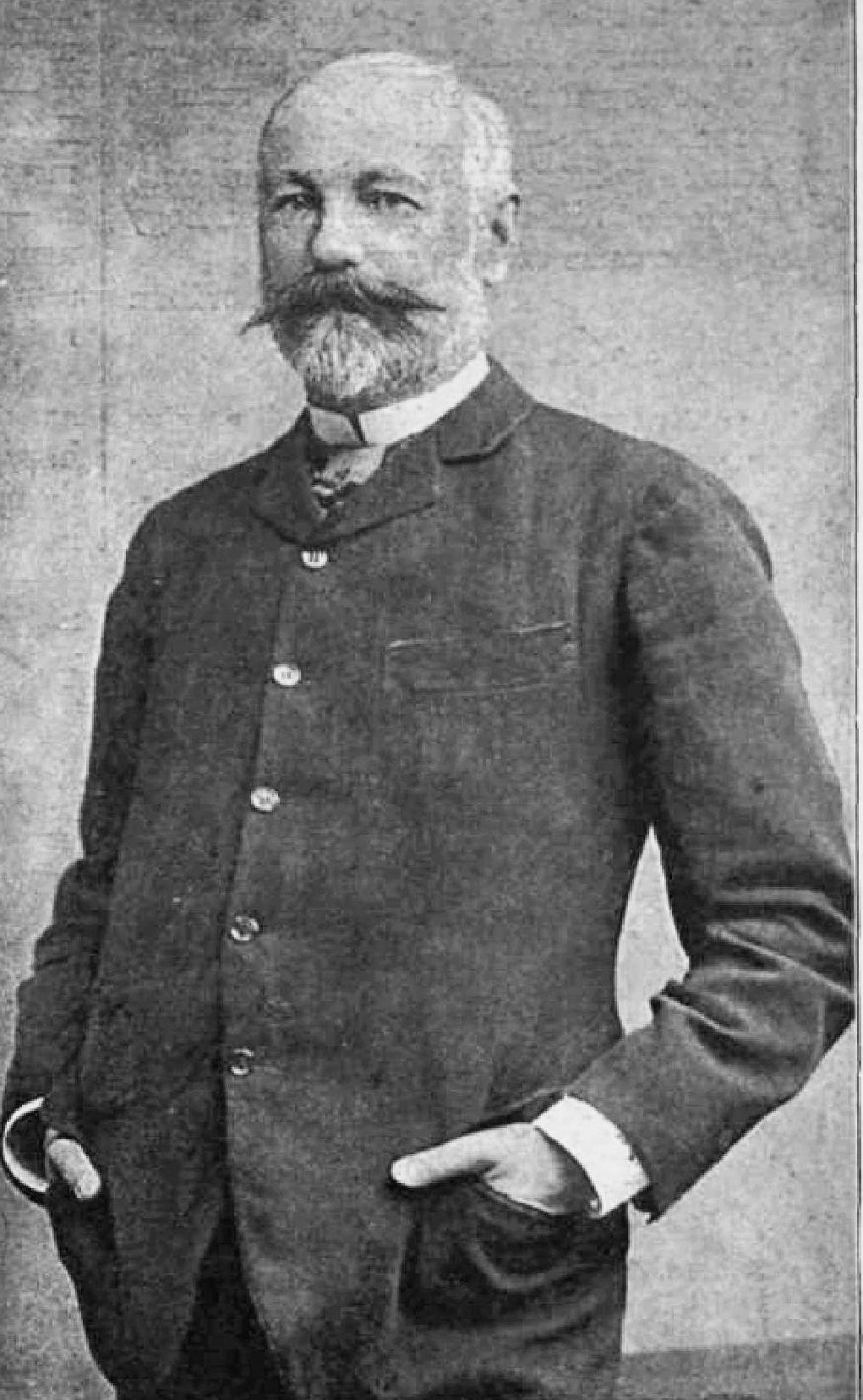

Minister of Croatian Affairs of Hungary
- In office 23 August 1889 – 10 December 1898
- Prime Minister: Kálmán Tisza; Gyula Szapáry; Sándor Wekerle; Dezső Bánffy
- Preceded by: Koloman Bedeković
- Succeeded by: Ervin Cseh

Personal details
- Born: 1 September 1834 Kurilovec (Velika Gorica), Croatia-Slavonia, Austria-Hungary
- Died: 30 May 1910 (aged 75) Vienna, Austria-Hungary
- Party: Unionist Party
- Profession: politician

Emerik Josipović (Hungarian: Imre Josipovich; 1 September 1834 – 30 May 1910) was a Croatian politician of the Unionist Party, who served as Minister without portfolio of Croatian Affairs between 1889 and 1898. His father was Antun Josipović, who fought besides the Hungarians during the Hungarian Revolution of 1848, for which he was imprisoned and his property was confiscated. After regaining this property, Emerik was primarily occupied with repairs of it until the 1870s. As representative of Varaždin County, he was member of the Diet of Croatia – the Sabor – but when Koloman Bedeković died, he became also member of the Diet of Hungary – the Országgyűlés.

Josipović was appointed Minister of Croatian Affairs in 1889. He resigned from his position on 10 December 1898. In 1892, he received inner privy councillor rank. In 1906 he became a member of the House of Magnates (the Hungarian assembly's upper house). His son, Gejza Josipović, also served as Minister of Croatian Affairs.

Political offices
Preceded by Koloman Bedeković	Minister of Croatian Affairs; 1889–1898	Succeeded by Ervin Cseh
