= Nikola Tomašić =

Ban of Croatia from 1910 to 1912

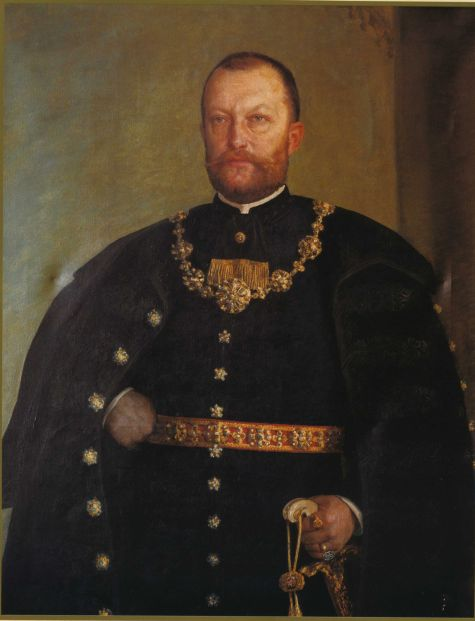

Ban of Croatia-Slavonia
- In office 5 February 1910 – 19 January 1912
- Preceded by: Pavao Rauch
- Succeeded by: Slavko Cuvaj

Minister of Croatian Affairs of Hungary
- In office 27 June 1903 – 3 November 1903
- Prime Minister: Károly Khuen-Héderváry
- Preceded by: Ervin Cseh
- Succeeded by: Ervin Cseh

Personal details
- Born: 13 January 1864 Zagreb, Kingdom of Croatia, Austrian Empire
- Died: 29 May 1918 (aged 54) Treščerovac near Ozalj, Croatia-Slavonia, Austria-Hungary
- Party: People's Party; Croatian National Party
- Profession: Politician, lawyer, economist, translator

Nikola Tomašić (Hungarian: Miklós Tomassich or Miklós Tomasics; 13 January 1864 – 29 May 1918) was a Croatian politician, who served as ban (viceroy) of the Kingdom of Croatia-Slavonia. In 1903 he served as Minister without portfolio of Croatian Affairs.

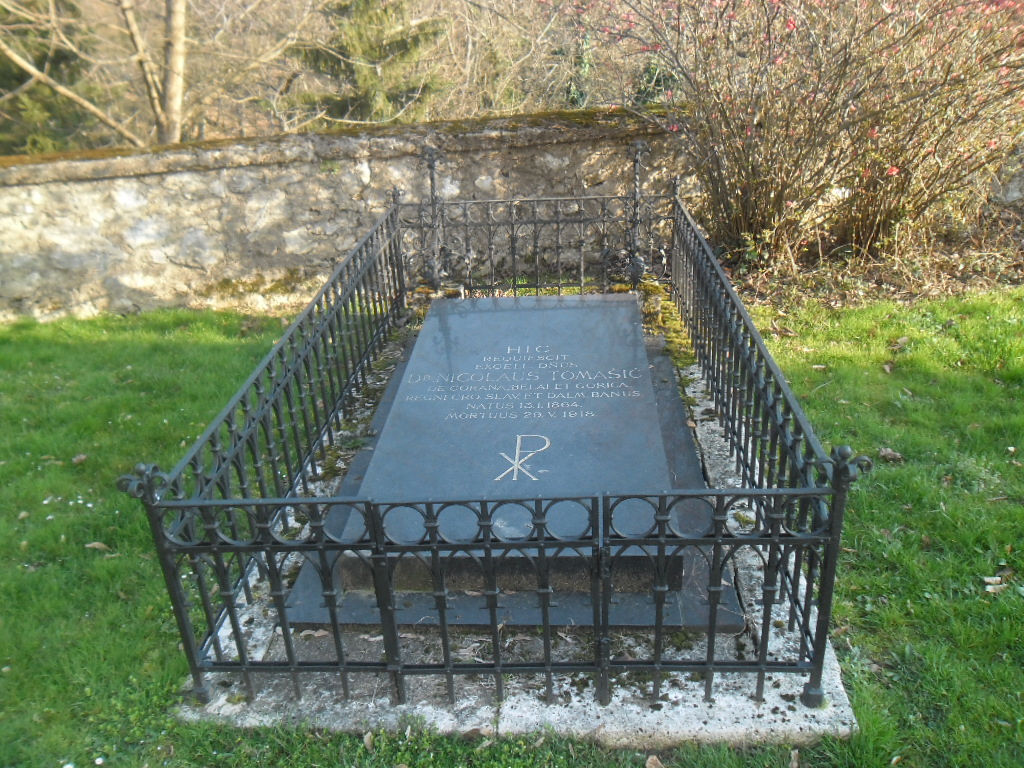
Tomašić's tomb

Political offices
Preceded by Ervin Cseh	Minister of Croatian Affairs; 1903	Succeeded by Ervin Cseh
Preceded by Pavao Rauch	Ban of Croatia-Slavonia; 1910–1912	Succeeded by Slavko Cuvaj
