= Minister of Croatian affairs of Hungary =

The minister of Croatian affairs of Hungary (Hungarian: horvát-szlavón-dalmát tárca nélküli miniszter; Croatian: hrvatsko-slavonsko-dalmatinski ministar bez lisnice) was a member of the Hungarian cabinet in Austria-Hungary. The position was created following the Croatian–Hungarian Agreement in 1868. The minister was appointed by the emperor-king. The officeholder kept a connection between Croatia-Slavonia-Dalmatia and the Hungarian Kingdom (and also the Austrian part of Austria-Hungary). This position was without portfolio.

== History of the position ==
In accordance with the Article 44 of the Croatian–Hungarian Settlement the position of minister without portfolio emerged, representing the interests of Croatia-Slavonia and Dalmatia in the Hungarian cabinet, who became responsible to the National Assembly in Pest (later Budapest), which also functioned as a joint legislature after 1868 (however the separately administered Dalmatia sent delegates to the Imperial Council, not the Hungarian parliament). In December 1868, Koloman Bedeković was appointed the first Minister of Croatian Affairs. On 31 January 1869, Emperor-King Franz Joseph I ordered the abolition of the Croatian Court Chancellery in Vienna which was officially replaced by the Royal Ministry of Dalmatia, Croatia and Slavonia (after 1873 Ministry of Croatia, Slavonia and Dalmatia) in the Hungarian capital and the autonomous Royal Land Government in Zagreb. By May 1869 the ministry moved to Buda and seated at 16 Dísz Square.

== Ministers of Croatian affairs of Hungary (1868–1919) ==
=== Lands of the Crown of Saint Stephen (1868–1918) ===
Parties Croatian Unionist Party Croatian People's Party Liberal Party/National Party of Work National Constitution Party Catholic People's Party MSZDP Independent

No.	Portrait	Name (Birth–Death)	Term of office		Political party	Cabinet	Assembly (Election)
1		Koloman Bedeković (1818–1889); 1st term	8 December 1868	10 February 1871	Unionist Party	Andrássy; DP	3 (1865)
1		Koloman Bedeković (1818–1889); 1st term	8 December 1868	10 February 1871	Unionist Party	Andrássy; DP	4 (1869)
2		Petar Pejačević (1804–1887)	10 February 1871	14 November 1871	Independent	Andrássy; DP	4 (1869)
2		Petar Pejačević (1804–1887)	14 November 1871	4 December 1872	Independent	Lónyay; DP	4 (1869)
2		Petar Pejačević (1804–1887)	14 November 1871	4 December 1872	Independent	Lónyay; DP	5 (1872)
2		Petar Pejačević (1804–1887)	4 December 1872	21 March 1874	Independent	Szlávy; DP	5 (1872)
2		Petar Pejačević (1804–1887)	21 March 1874	2 March 1875	Independent	Bittó; DP–BK	5 (1872)
(2)		Petar Pejačević (1804–1887)	2 March 1875	20 October 1875	Liberal Party	Wenckheim; SZP	5 (1872)
(2)		Petar Pejačević (1804–1887)	20 October 1875	25 February 1876	Liberal Party	K. Tisza; SZP	6 (1875)
(1)		Koloman Bedeković (1818–1889); 2nd term	25 February 1876	10 August 1889 (died in office)	Unionist Party	K. Tisza; SZP	6 (1875)
(1)		Koloman Bedeković (1818–1889); 2nd term	25 February 1876	10 August 1889 (died in office)	Unionist Party	K. Tisza; SZP	7 (1878)
(1)		Koloman Bedeković (1818–1889); 2nd term	25 February 1876	10 August 1889 (died in office)	Unionist Party	K. Tisza; SZP	8 (1881)
(1)		Koloman Bedeković (1818–1889); 2nd term	25 February 1876	10 August 1889 (died in office)	Unionist Party	K. Tisza; SZP	9 (1884)
(1)		Koloman Bedeković (1818–1889); 2nd term	25 February 1876	10 August 1889 (died in office)	Unionist Party	K. Tisza; SZP	10 (1887)
3		Emerik Josipović (1834–1910)	23 August 1889	15 March 1890	Unionist Party	K. Tisza; SZP	10 (1887)
3		Emerik Josipović (1834–1910)	15 March 1890	19 November 1892	Unionist Party	Szapáry; SZP	10 (1887)
3		Emerik Josipović (1834–1910)	15 March 1890	19 November 1892	Unionist Party	Szapáry; SZP	11 (1892)
3		Emerik Josipović (1834–1910)	19 November 1892	15 January 1895	Unionist Party	Wekerle I SZP	11 (1892)
3		Emerik Josipović (1834–1910)	15 January 1895	10 December 1898	Unionist Party	Bánffy; SZP	11 (1892)
3		Emerik Josipović (1834–1910)	15 January 1895	10 December 1898	Unionist Party	Bánffy; SZP	12 (1896)
4		Ervin Cseh (1838–1918); 1st term	10 December 1898	26 February 1899	Independent	Bánffy; SZP	12 (1896)
4		Ervin Cseh (1838–1918); 1st term	26 February 1899	27 June 1903	Independent	Széll; SZP	12 (1896)
4		Ervin Cseh (1838–1918); 1st term	26 February 1899	27 June 1903	Independent	Széll; SZP	13 (1901)
5		Nikola Tomašić (1864–1918)	27 June 1903	3 November 1903	Croatian People's Party	Khuen-Héderváry I SZP	13 (1901)
(4)		Ervin Cseh (1838–1918); 2nd term	3 November 1903	18 June 1905	Independent	I. Tisza I SZP	13 (1901)
(4)		Ervin Cseh (1838–1918); 2nd term	3 November 1903	18 June 1905	Independent	I. Tisza I SZP	14 (1905)
6		Stjepan Kovačević (1841–1913)	18 June 1905	8 April 1906	Independent	Fejérváry; SZP	14 (1905)
—		Sándor Wekerle (1848–1921) acting	8 April 1906	23 April 1906	National Constitution Party	Wekerle II; F48P–OAP–KNP–PDP	14 (1905)
—		Sándor Wekerle (1848–1921) acting	8 April 1906	23 April 1906	National Constitution Party	Wekerle II; F48P–OAP–KNP–PDP	15 (1906)
7		Gejza Josipović (1857–1934); 1st term	23 April 1906	17 January 1910	Unionist Party	Wekerle II; F48P–OAP–KNP–PDP	15 (1906)
—		Károly Khuen-Héderváry (1849–1918) acting	17 January 1910	22 April 1912	National Party of Work	Khuen-Héderváry II; NMP	15 (1906)
—		Károly Khuen-Héderváry (1849–1918) acting	17 January 1910	22 April 1912	National Party of Work	Khuen-Héderváry II; NMP	16 (1910)
(7)		Gejza Josipović (1857–1934); 2nd term	22 April 1912	10 June 1913	Unionist Party	Lukács; NMP	16 (1910)
—		István Tisza (1861–1918) acting	10 June 1913	21 July 1913	National Party of Work	I. Tisza II; NMP	16 (1910)
8		Teodor Pejačević (1855–1928) interned in France on 22 August 1914	21 July 1913	16 January 1916	Independent	I. Tisza II; NMP	16 (1910)
—		István Tisza (1861–1918) acting for Teodor Pejačević	22 August 1914	16 January 1916	National Party of Work	I. Tisza II; NMP	16 (1910)
9		Imre Hideghéthy (1860–1920)	16 January 1916	15 June 1917	Croatian People's Party	I. Tisza II; NMP	16 (1910)
10		Aladár Zichy (1864–1937)	15 June 1917	18 August 1917	Catholic People's Party	Esterházy; NMP–F48P–OAP–PDP–KNP	16 (1910)
11		Károly Unkelhäusser (1866–1938)	18 August 1917	23 August 1917	Independent	Esterházy; NMP–F48P–OAP–PDP–KNP	16 (1910)
11		Károly Unkelhäusser (1866–1938)	23 August 1917	31 October 1918	Independent	Wekerle III; NMP–F48P–OAP–PDP–KNP	16 (1910)
12		Zsigmond Kunfi (1879–1929)	6 November 1918	16 November 1918	MSZDP	M. Károlyi; F48P–Károlyi–PRP–MSZDP	MNT (—)

=== Hungarian People's Republic (1918–1919) ===
Parties MSZDP

No.	Portrait	Name (Birth–Death)	Term of office		Political party	Cabinet	Assembly (Election)
1		Zsigmond Kunfi (1879–1929)	16 November 1918	19 January 1919	MSZDP	M. Károlyi; F48P–Károlyi–PRP–MSZDP	MNT (—)

== After World War I ==
After the First World War the ministry was dissolved because Croatia-Slavonia became part of the State of Slovenes, Croats and Serbs and subsequently the Kingdom of Serbs, Croats and Slovenes. However, the position de jure existed until the proclamation of the Hungarian Soviet Republic in March 1919.

Zsigmond Kunfi, as the last de facto minister of Croatian Affairs, was entrusted with the ministry's liquidation between 6 November 1918 and 19 January 1919.

== See also ==
- List of Croatian bans
- List of dukes and kings of Croatia
- List of heads of state of Hungary
- List of prime ministers of Hungary
- Politics of Croatia
- Politics of Hungary

Cabinet ministers

- Minister of Agriculture (Hungary)
- Minister of Civilian Intelligence Services (Hungary)
- Minister of Defence (Hungary)
- Minister of Education (Hungary)
- Minister of Finance (Hungary)
- Minister of Foreign Affairs (Hungary)
- Minister of the Interior (Hungary)
- Minister of Justice (Hungary)
- Minister of Public Works and Transport (Hungary)

== Sources ==
- Holjevac, Željko (2015). "A budapesti horvát minisztérium (1868–1918)". In Fodor, Pál; Sokcsevits, Dénes (eds.). A horvát–magyar együttélés fordulópontjai. Intézmények, társadalom, gazdaság, kultúra [Turning Points of the Croato-Hungarian Coexistence: Institutions, Society, Economy, Culture] (in Hungarian). MTA Bölcsészettudományi Kutatóközpont. pp. 419–425. ISBN 978-963-416-019-9.
