= Slavko Cuvaj =

Croatian politician; Ban of Croatia-Slavonia (1912–1913)

Baron Slavko pl. Cuvaj od Ivanjske
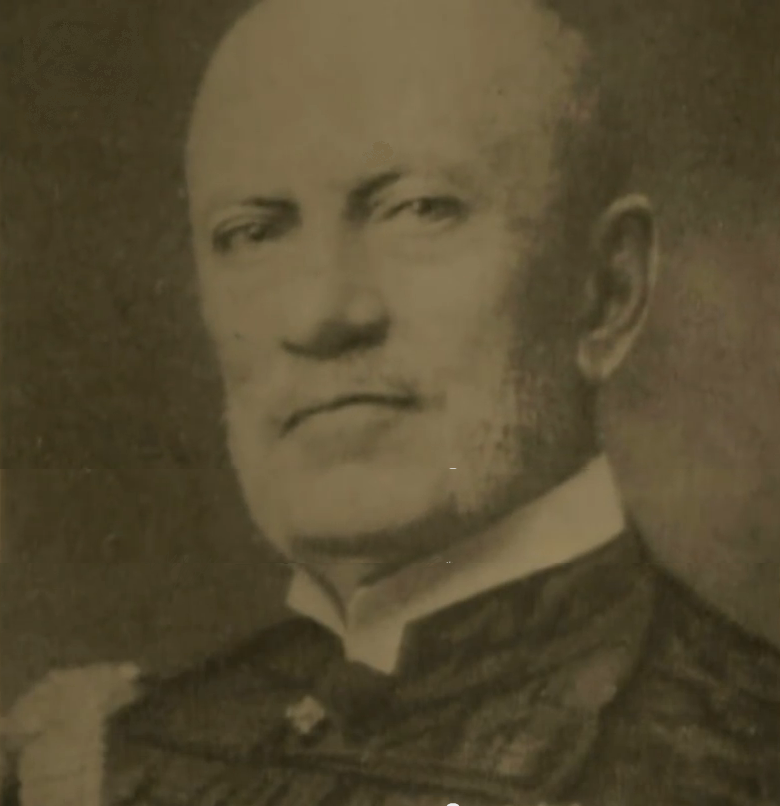
- Portrait of Slavko Cuvaj

Deputy Ban of the Kingdom of Croatia, Slavonia and Dalmatia
- In office 5 July 1909 – 8 February 1910
- Preceded by: Nikola Czernkovich-Dolski
- Succeeded by: Levin Chavrak

Ban of the Kingdom of Croatia, Slavonia and Dalmatia
- In office 19 January 1912 – 21 July 1913
- Deputy: Dragutin Unkelhäuser
- Preceded by: Nikola Tomašić
- Succeeded by: Ivan Skerlecz

Personal details
- Born: 26 February 1851 Bjelovar, Slavonian Military Frontier, Austrian Empire
- Died: 31 January 1931 (aged 79) Vienna, Austria
- Spouse: Anka Cuvaj
- Occupation: Lawyer, administrator
- Profession: Jurist
- Known for: Service as Ban and Royal Commissioner; surviving assassination attempts

Slavko pl. Cuvaj od Ivanjske (Bjelovar, 26 February 1851 – Vienna, 31 January 1931), Croatian politician. Croatian Ban and royal commissioner (povjerenik) in the Kingdom of Croatia-Slavonia from 1912 to 1913.

== Early life and career ==
His father Juraj was mayor of Bjelovar (1871–1881), and his brother Antun was a school writer and pedagogue. He graduated in law in Vienna. He began his service as a pristav (official) at the royal authority in Vinkovci, and later served as a computing advisor in Rakovac and Petrinja, in the Military Frontier. In 1878, during the occupation of Bosnia and Herzegovina, he was appointed government commissioner for the city of Brod. In 1881 he was promoted, as a reward, to the rank of government clerk. From 1885 he was vice-county administrator (podžupan) in Đakovo, and from 1892 in Požega. From 1905 to 1906 he was the Lika-Krbava grand župan. After that he was retired at his own request. From 1908 to 1909 he served as supreme chief in Zagreb. In the period from 23 July 1909 to 1910 he was head of the Department of Internal Affairs in Zagreb and deputy ban (podban) during the tenure of Ban Pavao Rauch (appointed 5 July 1909).

== Ban and commissionership ==
He was appointed Ban on 20 January 1912. He was unable to break the Croatian-Serbian Coalition. The Sabor, which had already been convened for 7 February, was on his proposal dissolved on 27 January 1912. On 4 April the Constitution was suspended, while on 5 April he was appointed royal commissioner. The young activist Luka Jukić carried out an unsuccessful assassination attempt against him on 8 June 1912 in Zagreb. At that time the Yugoslav national revolutionary youth movement was in full swing. The great and unexpected successes of Serbia in the First Balkan War forced the ruling circles of Vienna and Budapest to make concessions to Zagreb. After the assassination attempt was repeated on 31 October, Cuvaj was "sent on leave" on 22 December and never returned to the position of commissioner. Administration was entrusted to Dr. Unkelhäuser, and when Cuvaj was relieved of his duties, Baron Ivan Skerlecz was appointed as the new commissioner.

== Criticism ==
Miroslav Krleža wrote of him: "a bloodthirsty tyrant of his own people, who for the distinction of consistently implementing anti-Slavic policy and for promoting foreign rule received a baronial title."

== Literature ==
- Branko Ostajmer: Election of a people's representative in Đakovo 1884., Scrinia Slavonica, Vol.3 No.1, November 2003.
- Mira Kolar: The Activities of Vice-Roy Pavao Rauch In Croatia, Review of Croatian History, Vol.I No.1, December 2005.
- Ferdo Šišić, Povijest Hrvata: pregled povijesti hrvatskog naroda. 1526.–1918. drugi dio, Marjan tisak, Split, 2004. ISBN 953-214-198-7
- Neda Engelsfeld, Povijest hrvatske države i prava: razdoblje od 18. do 20. stoljeća, Pravni fakultet, Zagreb, 2002. ISBN 953-6714-41-8
- Chronicle: Croatia, Dom i sviet, 1909. (13.), p. 258.

Preceded by Nikola Tomašić	Croatian Ban; 1912–1913	Succeeded by Ivan Skerlecz
