= Stjepan Kovačević =

Croatian politician (1841–1913)

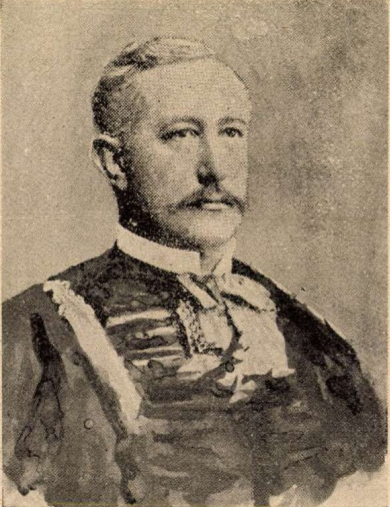

Minister of Croatian Affairs of Hungary
- In office 18 June 1905 – 8 April 1906
- Prime Minister: Géza Fejérváry
- Preceded by: Ervin Cseh
- Succeeded by: Sándor Wekerle

Personal details
- Born: 1841 Tovarnik, Croatia-Slavonia, Austria-Hungary
- Died: 25 April 1913 (aged 71–72) Zagreb, Croatia-Slavonia, Austria-Hungary
- Party: Independent
- Profession: politician

Stjepan Kovačević (Hungarian: István Kovacsevics; 1841 – 25 April 1913) was a Croatian politician, who served as Minister without portfolio of Croatian Affairs between 1905 and 1906.

Political offices
Preceded by Ervin Cseh	Minister of Croatian Affairs; 1905–1906	Succeeded by Sándor Wekerle
