= Zsigmond Kunfi =

Hungarian politician

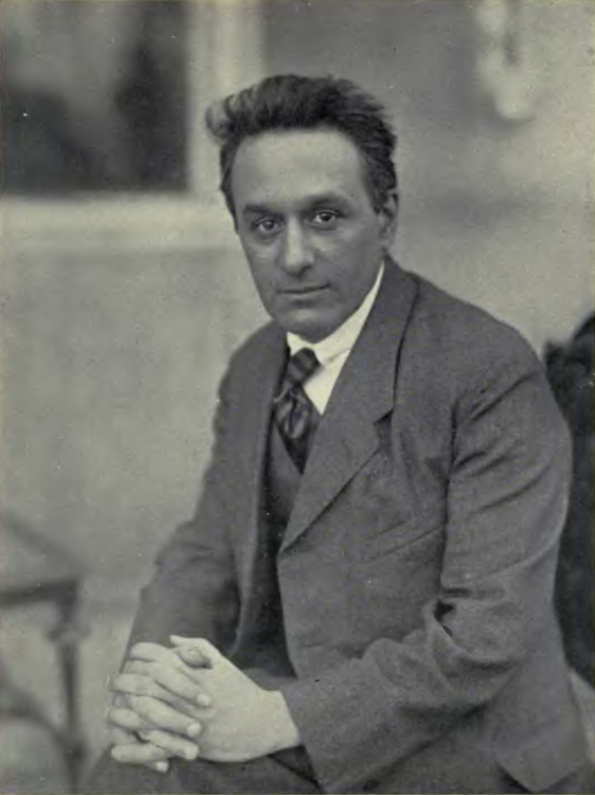

Minister of Croatian Affairs of Hungary
- In office 6 November 1918 – 19 January 1919
- Preceded by: Károly Unkelhäusser
- Succeeded by: post abolished

Personal details
- Born: Zsigmond Kohn; 28 April 1879 Nagykanizsa, Austria-Hungary
- Died: 18 November 1929 (aged 50) Vienna, Austria
- Party: MSZDP
- Spouse(s): Melanie Vámbéry (1904-?); Erzsébet Rónai (1914–1929)
- Children: Nóra
- Parent(s): Benedek Kunstätter; Janka Kohn
- Profession: politician, journalist

Zsigmond Kunfi (born as Zsigmond Kohn; 28 April 1879 – 18 November 1929) was a Hungarian politician, literary historian, journalist and translator, who served as Minister without portfolio of Croatian Affairs and as Minister of Labour and Welfare between 1918 and 1919.

His father was Benedek Kohn, a school teacher in Szigetvár who adopted the Hungarian family name Kunfi in 1875, his mother was Janka Kohn. After Zsigmond finished his grammar school in Szigetvár, he attended the University of Kolozsvár, where he graduated as a German-Hungarian high school literature teacher in 1903. His political and philosophical views were near to Karl Kautsky's radical ideas. In 1904, he became member of the Social Democratic Party of Hungary, therefore he lost his job as a grammar school teacher in Kolozsvár. In 1907 he moved to Budapest, where he became the Deputy Editor-in-Chief of the Népszava ("People's voice") weekly journal and from 1908 he wrote for the Szocializmus magazine, but he also often wrote articles for the Nyugat and the Huszadik század ("20th Century") literary journals.

After the Aster Revolution, Kunfi become a member of the Hungarian National Council from 1918. As minister of Croatian Affairs, he was entrusted with the ministry's liquidation. In Dénes Berinkey's government he was appointed Minister of Education. He held this position also during the Hungarian Soviet Republic as People's Commissar. Kunfi resigned from his position and called for the dictatorship's liquidation. After that he emigrated to Austria. He worked as editor-in-chief of the Arbeiter Zeitung.

Kunfi committed suicide in Vienna. In Hungary, two days after his death, there was a nation-wide work stoppage in his memory. His ashes were reburied in Hungary in 1947.

Political offices
| Preceded by Károly Unkelhäusser | Minister of Croatian Affairs; 1918–1919 | Succeeded by post abolished |
| Preceded by Sándor Juhász Nagy | Minister of Education; 1919 | Succeeded by György Lukács |
