= Károly Szász =

Hungarian literary historian and politician (1865–1950)

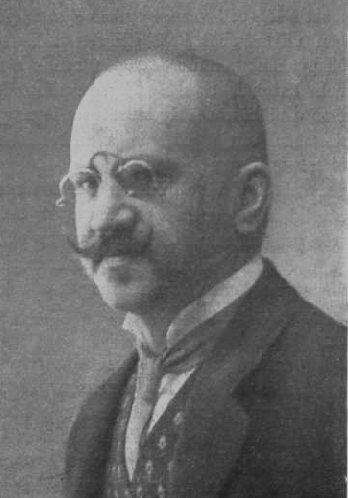

Speaker of the House of Representatives
- In office 3 July 1917 – 16 November 1918
- Preceded by: Pál Beőthy
- Succeeded by: House of Representatives dissolved János Hock (Hungarian National Council)

Personal details
- Born: 11 November 1865; Szabadszállás, Austrian Empire
- Died: 21 March 1950 (aged 84); Budapest, People's Republic of Hungary
- Political party: Party of National Work; National Centre Party; National Civic Party
- Profession: literary historian, politician

Károly Szász de Szemerja (11 November 1865 – 21 March 1950) was a Hungarian literary historian and politician, who served as the last Speaker of the House of Representatives between 1917 and 1918. He was a member of the Hungarian Academy of Sciences, Kisfaludy Society and Petőfi Society.

He strongly opposed Endre Ady's poetry, his study about the poet attracted attention in the country. After the Declaration of Eckartsau (Emperor-King Charles I (IV) suspended his royal rights) Mihály Károlyi and Szász dissolved the House of Representatives and proclaimed the Republic on 16 November 1918. Szász said "during the pivotal historical events which took place in the past few weeks, the Hungarian people despised the basis of a sovereign, independent and democratic Hungary." Károlyi became Provisional President and the Diet of Hungary was replaced by the Hungarian National Council.

Szász retired from the politics after declaration of the republic. During the time of the Hungarian Soviet Republic, he was held prisoner as a hostage.

== Sources ==
- Jónás, Károly - Villám, Judit: A Magyar Országgyűlés elnökei 1848-2002. Argumentum, Budapest, 2002. pp. 177–180
- Szinnyei, József: Magyar írók élete és munkái XIII. (Steiner–Télfy). Budapest: Hornyánszky. 1909.
- Pintér, Jenő: A magyar irodalom története: tudományos rendszerezés, 8. kötet. (Irodalomtörténetírók és kritikusok c. alfejezet.) (1930–1941.)
- Pintér, Jenő: A magyar irodalom története: tudományos rendszerezés, 8. kötet. (Hagyományőrző költők c. alfejezet.) (1930–1941.)

Political offices
Preceded by Pál Beőthy	Speaker of the House of Representatives; 1917–1918	Succeeded by János Hock; Hungarian National Council
