= Pavao Rauch =

Ban of Croatia from 1908 to 1910

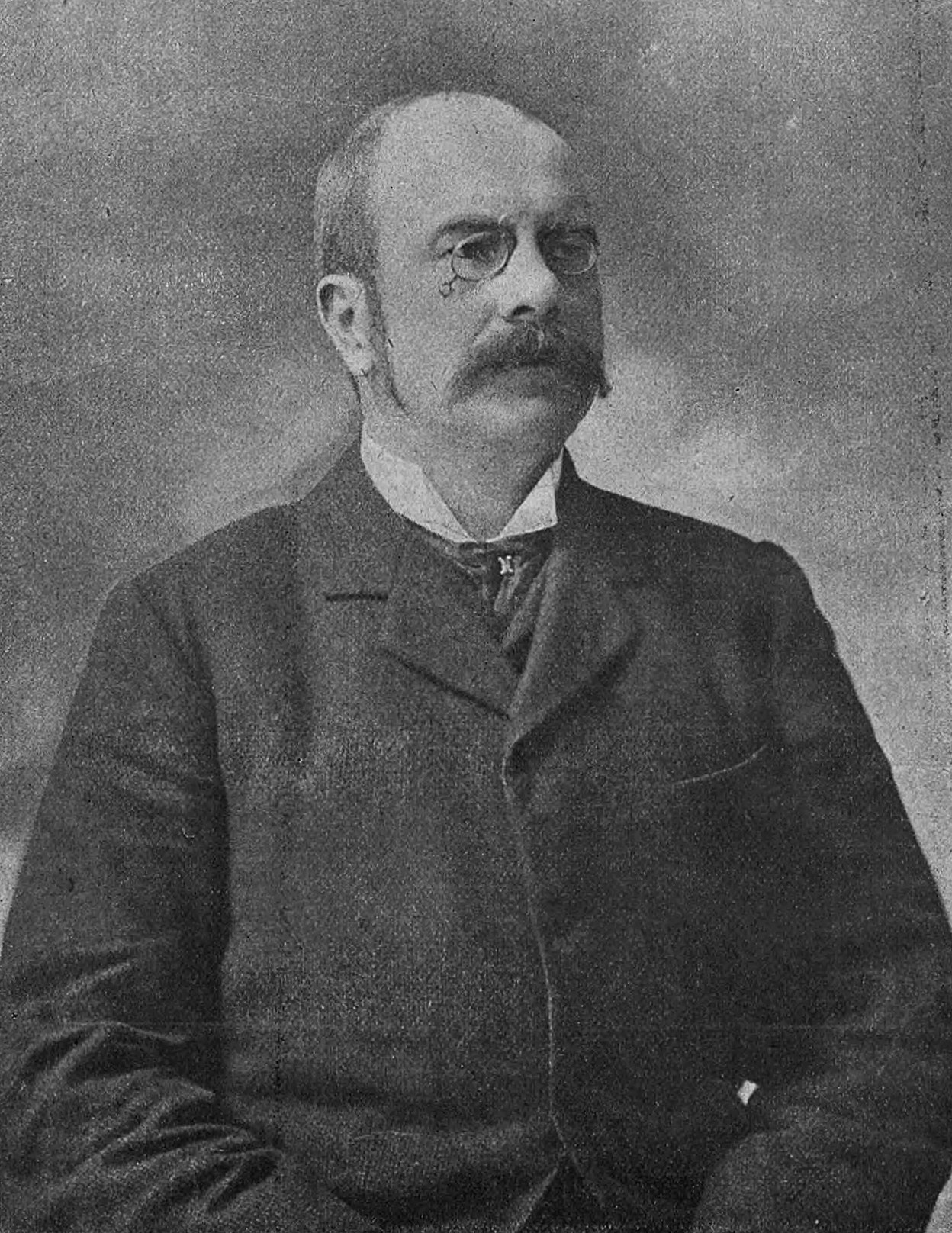

Ban of Croatia-Slavonia
- In office 8 January 1908 – 5 February 1910
- Preceded by: Aleksandar Rakodczay
- Succeeded by: Nikola Tomašić

Personal details
- Born: 20 February 1865 Zagreb, Kingdom of Croatia, Austrian Empire
- Died: 29 November 1933 (aged 68) Martijanec, Sava Banovina, Kingdom of Yugoslavia
- Party: Unionist Party
- Other political affiliations: Croat-Serb Coalition (until 1906)
- Profession: Politician

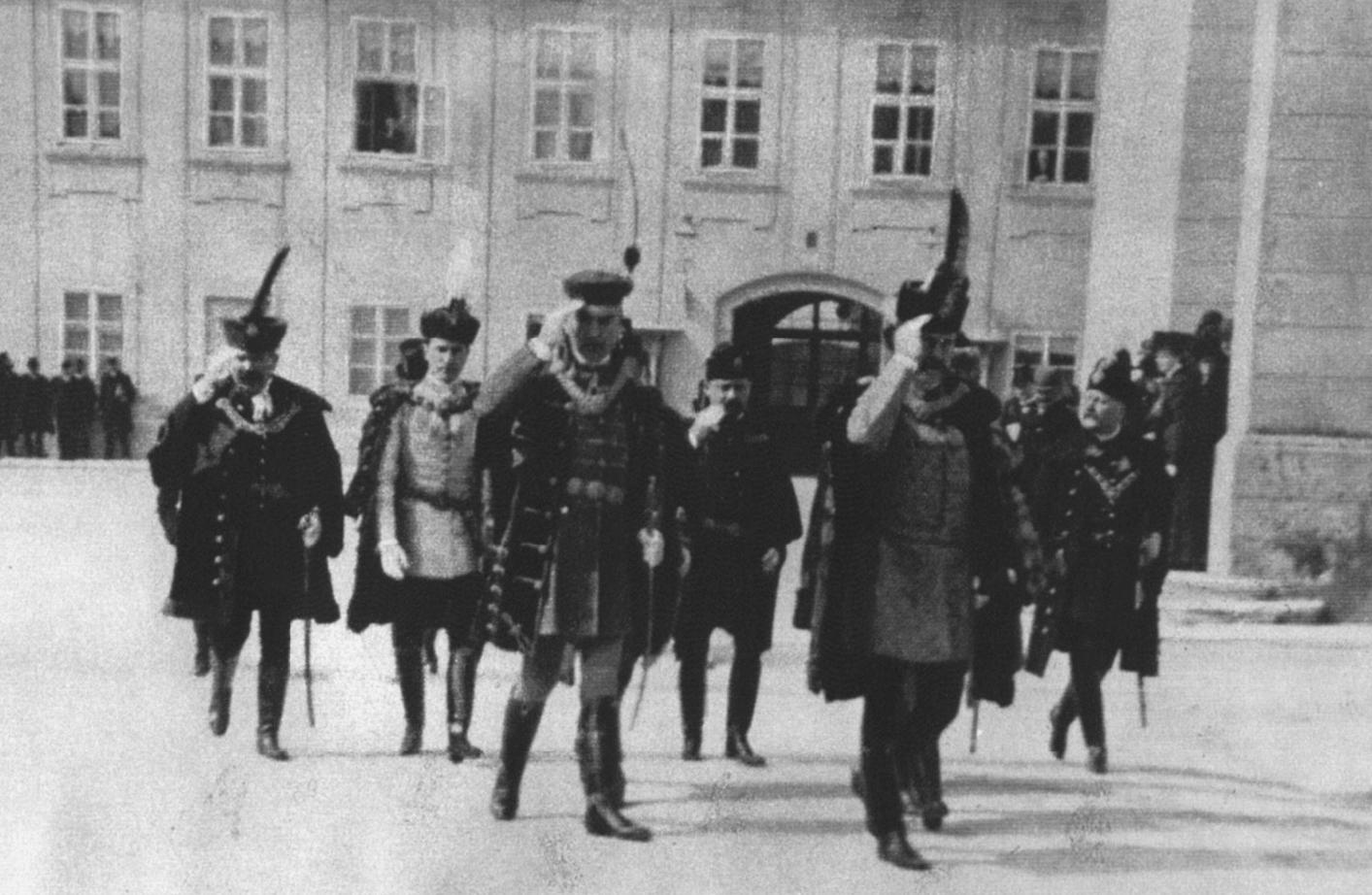
Pavao Rauch and dignitaries in Zagreb on St. Mark's Square

Baron Pavao Rauch de Nyék (20 February 1865 – 29 November 1933) was a Croatian politician who served as Ban (viceroy) of Croatia-Slavonia between 1908 and 1910.

== Life ==
Born in Zagreb, he was the son of Baron Levin Rauch de Nyék, Ban (viceroy) of Croatia-Slavonia, and Countess Antonia Sermage von Szomszédvár et Medvedgrád (1826–1913).

Pavao Rauch was appointed as vice-roy on 8 January 1908. Ten thousand protesters met Rauch upon his arrival in Zagreb on 15 January, hurling abuse and throwing spoiled eggs and pebbles at him. From the very beginning of Rauch's rule, the Croato-Serbian Coalition announced that it would refuse to co-operate in any manner with the new unionist vice-roy.

After the Croatian Parliament (Sabor) had been disbanded on 12 March 1908 because of its refusal to co-operate with and the insults it directed at the Vice-Roy, Pavao Rauch ruled through decrees and civil servants.

Despite all opposition predictions, Rauch remained in power for two years. On 5 February 1910, he received the King's letter of dismissal. Nikola Tomašić had been immediately appointed as new vice-roy.

In 1888 he married Rozin von Bächle. Their only son Paul was killed fighting in Samoa in 1918. Paul's widow Elsa remarried to Robert von Blumenthal in 1921.

He died in Martijanec.
