= István Tisza =

Hungarian politician (1861–1918)

Count István Tisza de Borosjenő et Szeged
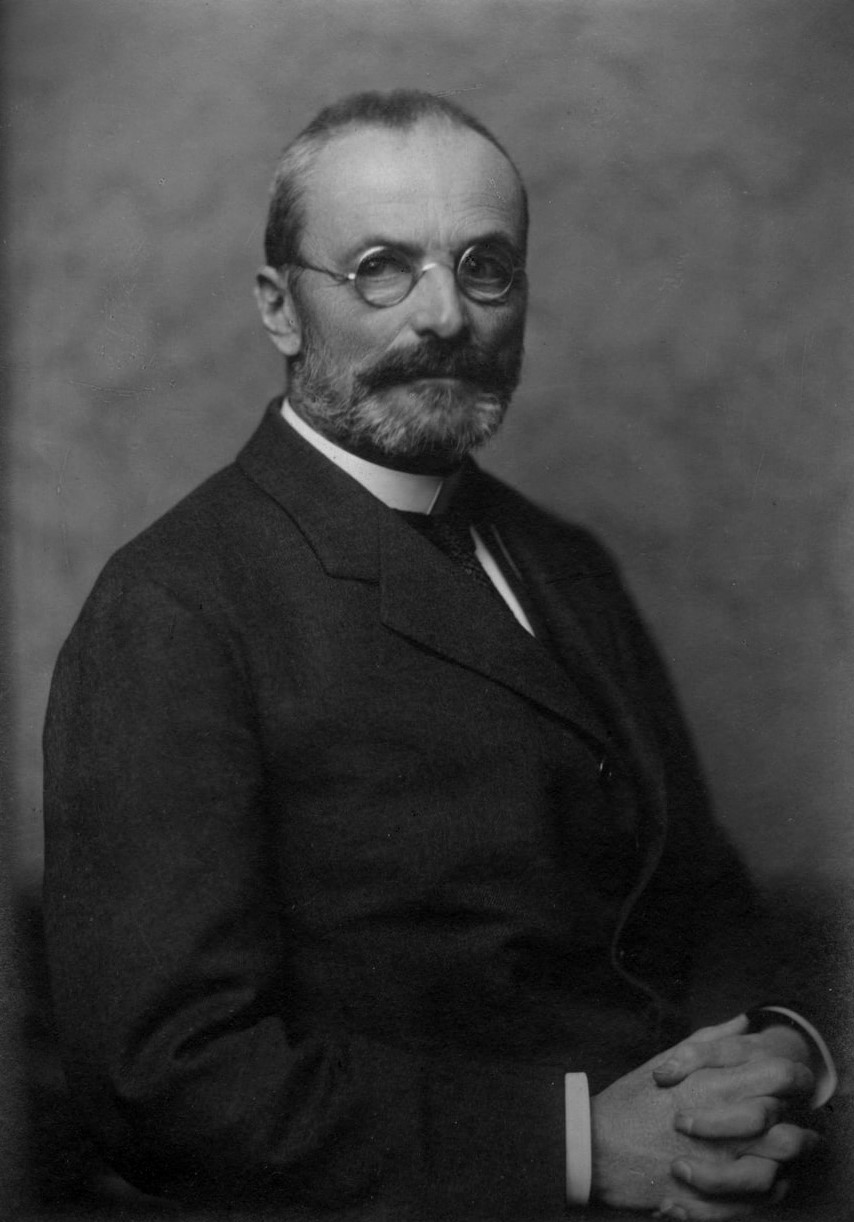
- Formal portrait by Ede Szenes, 1915

Prime Minister of the Kingdom of Hungary
- In office 3 November 1903 – 18 June 1905
- Monarch: Francis Joseph I
- Preceded by: Károly Khuen-Héderváry
- Succeeded by: Géza Fejérváry
- In office 10 June 1913 – 15 June 1917
- Monarchs: Francis Joseph I Charles IV
- Preceded by: László Lukács
- Succeeded by: Móric Esterházy

Personal details
- Born: 22 April 1861 Pest, Kingdom of Hungary, Austrian Empire
- Died: 31 October 1918 (aged 57) Budapest, Hungary
- Cause of death: Assassination
- Party: Liberal Party; National Party of Work
- Spouse: Ilona Tisza de Borosjenő
- Children: István; Juliska
- Profession: Economist, Lawyer, Political Scientist, Banker

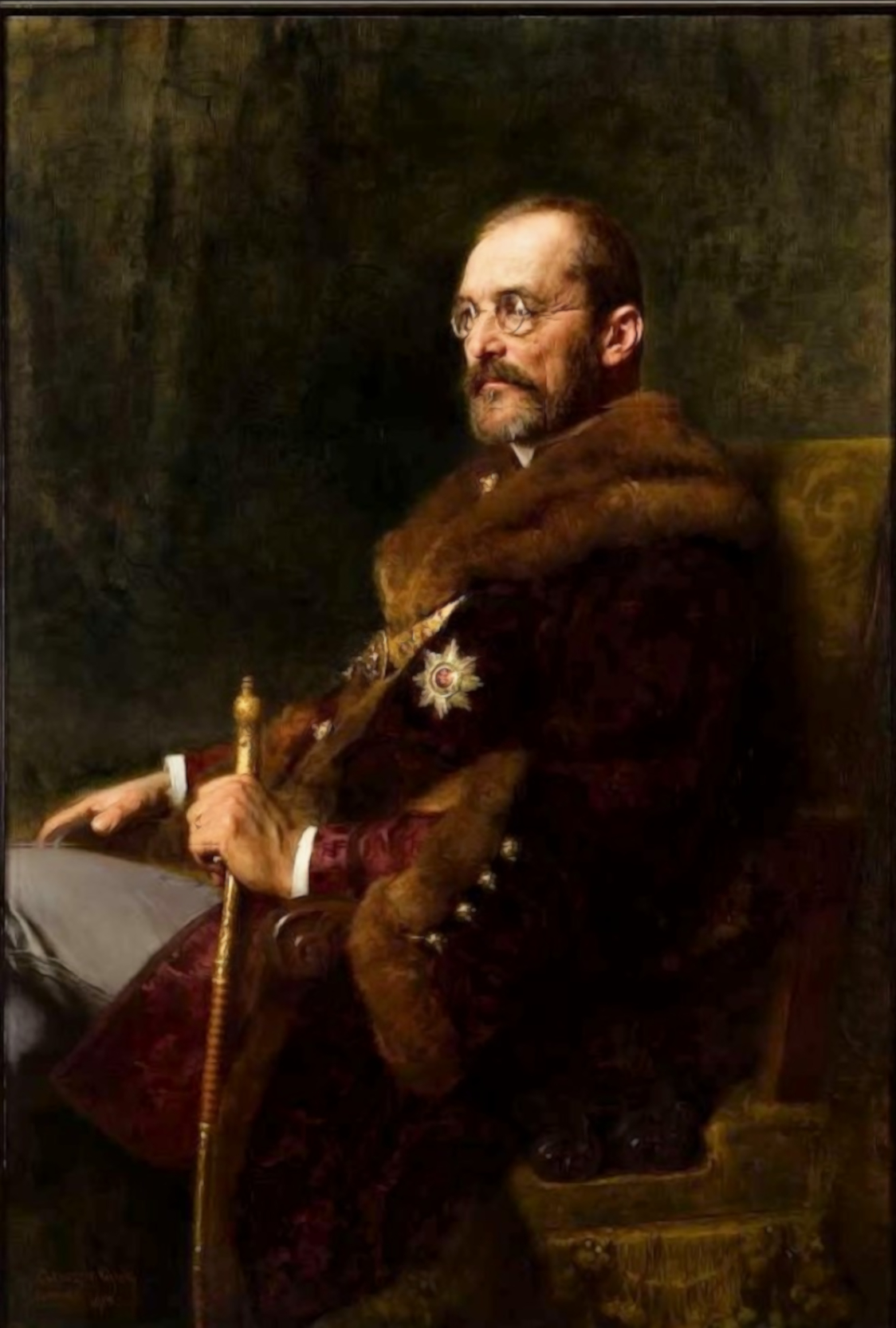
Portrait by Gyula Benczúr

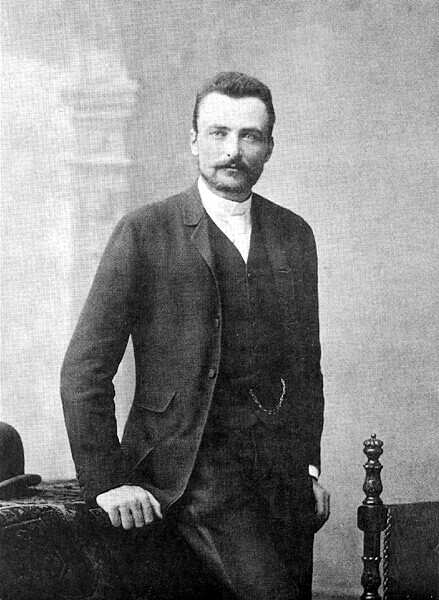
István Tisza in Oxford, England

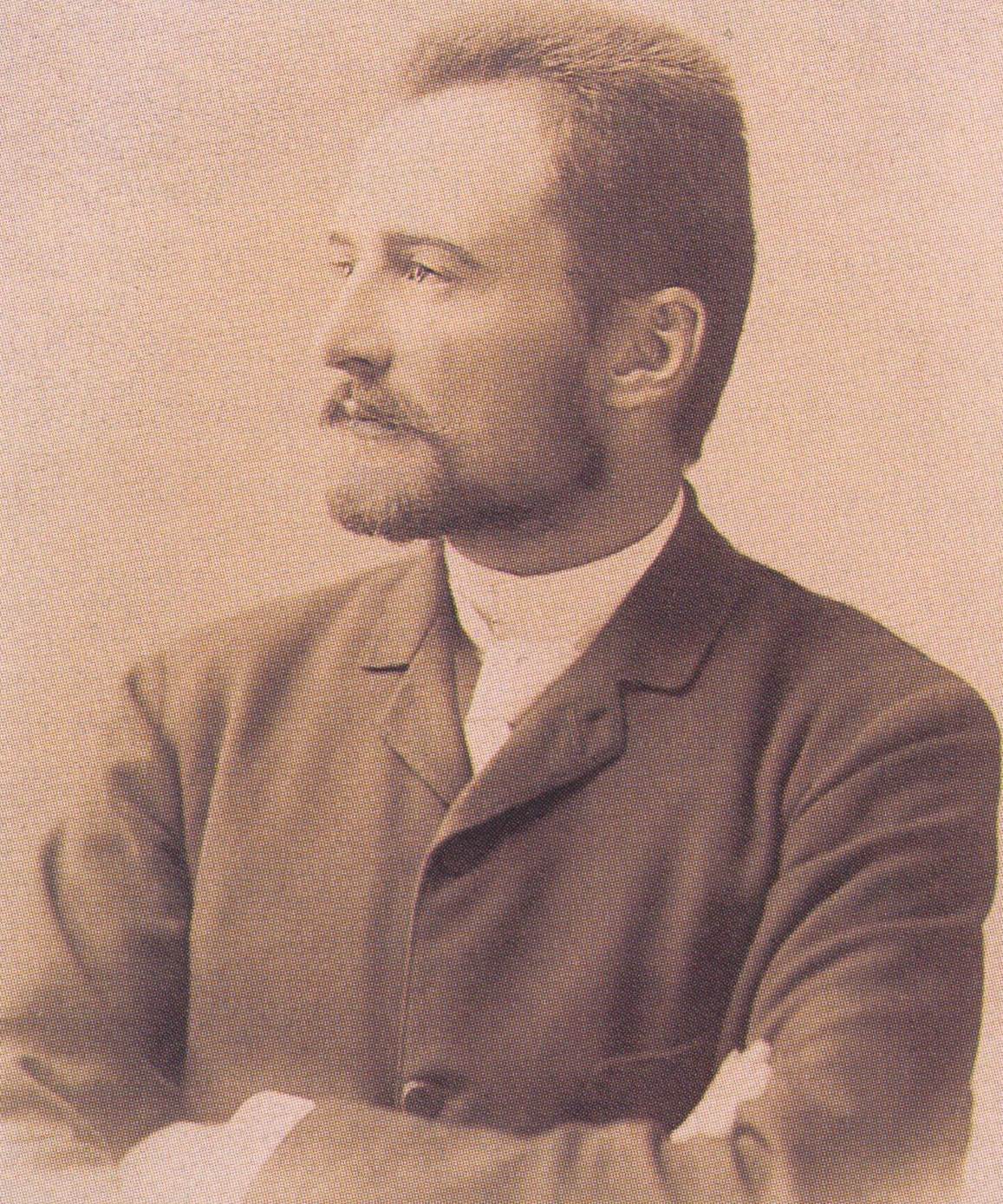
The 33-year-old Tisza as a member of the parliament in 1894

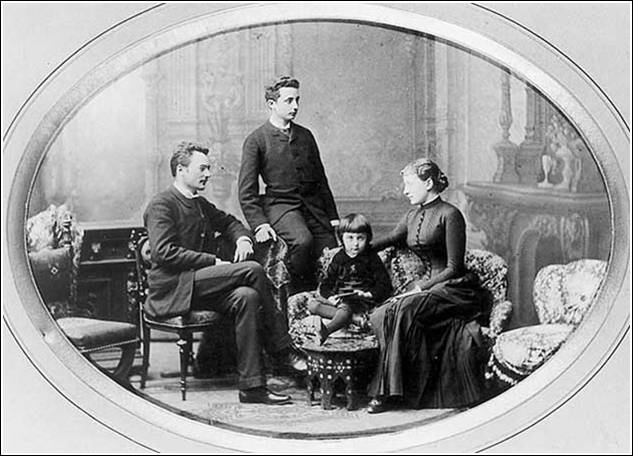
István Tisza and his family. Geszt, Hungary around 1895

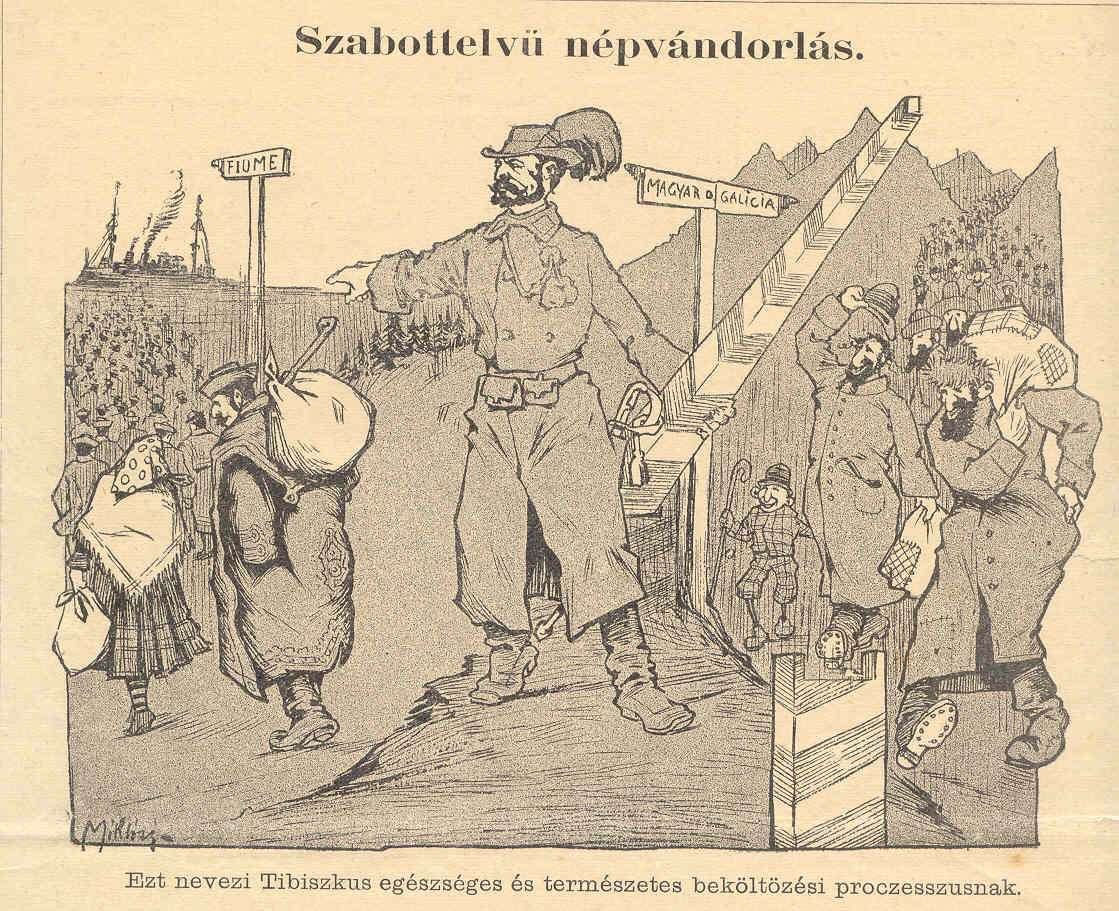
anti-semitic mockery against István Tisza

Count István Imre Lajos Pál Tisza de Borosjenő et Szeged (Hungarian: [ˈtisɒ ˈiʃtvaːn], English: Stephen Emery Louis Paul Tisza, short name: Stephen Tisza); (22 April 1861 – 31 October 1918) was a politician who served as prime minister of Hungary from 1903 to 1905 and from 1913 until 1917. He was also a political scientist, international lawyer, macroeconomist, member of the Hungarian Academy of Sciences and champion duelist. The outbreak of World War One defined his second term as prime minister. He was killed by leftist revolutionaries on 31 October 1918 during the Aster Revolution, the day Hungary declared its independence, dissolving the Dual Monarchy or Austro-Hungarian Empire. Tisza was the most zealous adherent of the Dual Monarchy (the partnership with Austria) among the Hungarian political leaders and pleaded for consensus between liberals and conservatives. As a Member of the Diet of Hungary (Note: Parliament) since 1887, he came to fear a political impasse in the conflict between the unyielding temper of the Emperor and the revolutionary spirit of the extremists.

During his political career, Tisza and his party remained bitterly unpopular among ethnic Hungarian voters and therefore - similarly to his father Kálmán Tisza - he drew most of his votes from ethnic minorities during the parliamentary elections.

Like his father, he supported industrialisation at the expense of the agricultural lobby, and opposed Anti-Semitism as economically counterproductive.

As an economist, Tisza stubbornly opposed on principle any governmental redistribution of agricultural land breaking up the large landed estates. During WWI, he opposed extending suffrage to active duty soldiers; before 1918 only 10% of the citizens of Kingdom of Hungary could vote and hold public office.

In international relations, Tisza's role model was Otto von Bismarck. In domestic affairs, he followed the English historical school of economics and was heavily influenced by the social and political development of England, which he considered the best way forward for Hungary.

== Early life and education ==
Born into the Tisza family as the son of Kálmán Tisza de Borosjenő, who served as prime minister of Hungary between 1875 and 1890 from the Liberal Party. The Tiszas were originally Calvinists of untitled lower noble origins (regarded as equivalent to the British gentry). His mother, Countess Helene von Degenfeld-Schonburg, was a Hungarian-German aristocrat from Baden-Württemberg (born: Helene Johanna Josepha Mathilde Gräfin von Degenfeld-Schonburg).

The young István raised in a puritanical and authoritarian Calvinist environment with high expectations. He had studied at home until the age of twelve, before he gained entry to grammar school named the Calvinist Gymnasium of Debrecen. After completing his secondary education, he took legal studies in Budapest, and then went on to study international law at Heidelberg University, followed by studies at the faculty of economics of Humboldt University of Berlin, obtaining a PhD, and eventually he put himself through the faculty of political science at the University of Oxford, earning a doctorate in political science.

At first, he became acquainted with the practical issues of the public administration at the Ministry of the Interior. He had done several studies on agricultural issues that were published in the Budapest Review. After serving 1 year as a volunteer hussar in the Royal Hungarian Honvéd army; where he got promoted to the rank of hussar officer, he settled in Bihar County and took an active part in the political and economic life of the county as a committee member and honorary chief notary of Bihar county.

== Political career ==
=== Tisza as a member of parliament ===
After overseeing his family estates in Bihar County and Geszt for five years, he decided to pursue a career in politics. He won his first parliamentary electoral mandate in 1886 with the Liberal Party in Vízakna (Now: Ocna Sibiului, Romania), a Transylvanian electoral district that he represented until 1892. Subsequently, he won his second seat in 1892 as a representative of Újbánya district (Now: Nová Baňa, Slovakia). In 1896, he won the seat of Ugra district (Now: Ungra, Romania). Meanwhile, he also became a member of the economic committee of the Hungarian parliament, where he was engaged in conferring about macroeconomic issues.

In the 1890s, having capitalized on a phenomenon that was prevalent among prestigious European politicians at that time, he held a number of sinecures, which thereby provided extraordinary income to him. He was the president of the Hungarian Industrial and Commercial Bank (Magyar Ipar- és Kereskedelmi Bank); and, besides, he took on positions on numerous corporate boards, e.g., on boards of numerous joint-stock companies and industrial enterprises. In the face of the financial crisis of the 1890s, many of these enterprises became the fastest emerging companies of the country under his lead; some of them could even become inevitably important enterprises in their own sectors. As a result, the mediocre Hungarian Industrial and Commercial Bank was transformed into the largest Bank of Hungary in a decade.

His uncle, the childless Lajos Tisza received the title of Count from Emperor Franz Joseph in 1897. However, Lajos Tisza conferred his new title upon his nephew Stephen with the consent of the Monarch, on 16 February 1897.

=== Prime minister (first term, 1903–1905) ===
He was chairman and board member of several financial institutions (e.g., the Hungarian Industrial and Commercial Bank) and many industrial companies but resigned from all of his memberships before he was appointed as prime minister. In this period of time, he managed to get the remains of prince Francis II Rákóczi repatriated from Turkey and interred in the St Elisabeth Cathedral of Kassa, today Košice.

==== Target of Leftist and socialist circles ====
On 19 April 1904, a nationwide strike of railroad workers broke out, which paralyzed the Hungarian economy. Tisza solved the crisis quickly but drastically: the organizers of the strike got arrested, and the participant railway workers got recruited into the Hungarian Honvéd army. Besides parliament introduced a Bill increasing the number of draftees and the police came down heavily on peasants for taking part in a Socialist gathering in Bihar, leaving 33 dead and several hundred wounded.

==== Target of anti-Semite circles ====
Tisza often used his influence in parliament to grant titles to wealthy Jewish families, especially for successful industrialists and bankers, of whose lives he thought had set a good example to the people worth following. Many of the young middle-class families were Jews or baptized Jews. Tisza often gathered influential men of Jewish extraction around himself as advisors. He even offered many positions in his cabinets to Jews. His first appointment was Samu Hazai as Minister of War. Two years later he picked János Teleszky as minister of finance. The third Jewish member of his cabinet was János Harkányi, minister of trade. Tisza appointed Samu Hazai as Minister of War during his second premiere. They all served for the duration of Tisza's seven years in office. The Liberal Party passed legislation for the Jewish emancipation in 1867 and appointed many Jewish origin MEPs to parliament (both to the upper and lower houses). In return, many Jews supported the party. Many districts of Budapest, where Jews made up half of the voters, reliably voted for the Liberal candidates. Similarly to the policy of his father, István Tisza allowed the unrestricted immigration of Jewish refugees from the Russian Empire, who fled from the Tzarist pogroms. His philosemitic political attitude made him a target of anti-Semite politicians and political circles.

==== Target of radical nationalists ====
At the beginning of the 20th century, only 54.5% (1910 census) of the population of the Kingdom of Hungary considered themselves to be Hungarians. The Tisza's party —i.e. "The Liberal Party of Hungary" urgently needed the support of minorities to maintain the majority of the party in the Hungarian parliament. The liberal party was the most popular political force in the electoral districts where the ethnic minorities represented the local majority. However, his main political opponents —i.e. "The nationalist Party of Independence and '48 and Catholic People's Party" could collect mandates only from the Hungarian majority electoral districts.

==== "Election by handkerchief" and the victory of nationalist opposition ====
The rules of the parliamentary procedure of the Kingdom of Hungary in the Dual Monarchy were based on the common law which was the feature of feudal parliaments, meaning that everybody could deliver speeches without any time limit, so, the most prominent speakers could take the stage for as long as 4–8 hours. However, this paralyzed the procedure of the Hungarian legislature. For decades, the opposition often wielded this tactic to obstruct legislation in important cases where the government should have been exercised its authority without disruption.

Tisza decided to have the rules of Parliament modified to get the obstructions of the opposition out of the way. On behalf of The Liberal Party, it was deputy Gábor Dániel who made the proposal to Parliament to modify the rules in a way to substantially have the possibility of the stonewalling tactics of the opposition narrowed. This took place, on 18 November 1904, after István Tisza had delivered a short speech. President of the House, Dezső Perczel had, in violation of the House rules, silently announced the start of the voting on the proposition and then by waving a handkerchief, he gave the members of The Liberal Party the signal to start voting.

In response to what happened; out of curiosity, the members of the opposition stood up because they did not understand the situation. At that time, however, standing up was the means of approving a proposal and staying put was the means of turning down a proposal in Parliament. And after reading the King's handwritten message out to Parliament, Dezső Perczel declared that the proposal passed amid an ear-splitting tumult and then the session got adjourned until 13 December. But the next day the opposition unified into an alliance, and shortly afterwards many prominent members left the Liberal Party—e.g., Kálmán Széll, Gyula Wlassics, Pál Teleki, Gyula Andrássy, Miklós Bánffy. Some members of them headed up by Gyula Andrássy broke away to form a rival party and joined the opposition. They first named themselves "The Dissidents" but then their name was changed to The National Constitution Party. For the rest of the year, the opposition made it impossible for Parliament to proceed with the legislative work and by January 1905, the situation became ex lex or anarchical. As a result, the King dissolved Parliament and scheduled to hold a new parliamentary election.

However, these events that went down in history as "election by handkerchief" cost The Liberal Party dear. After the 1905 election, Parliament approved a new coalition government, ending the historic 30-year rule of The Liberal Party and sending the polarizing leader into the opposition which eventually led to the dissolution of The Party.

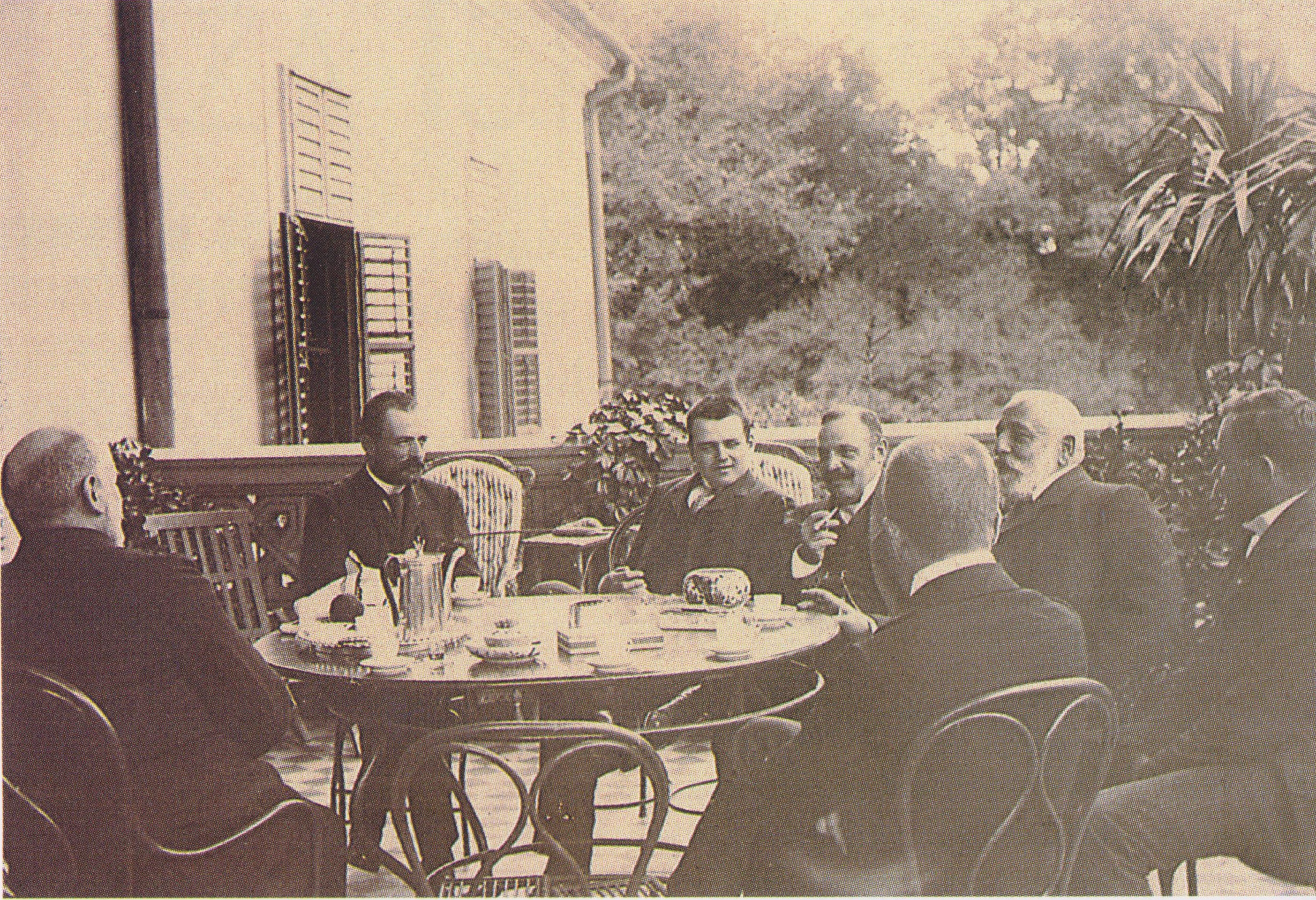
Tisza and his son with ministers and leaders of the Liberal Party in his family estate at Geszt in 1904

==== National Party of Work, electoral victory in 1910 ====
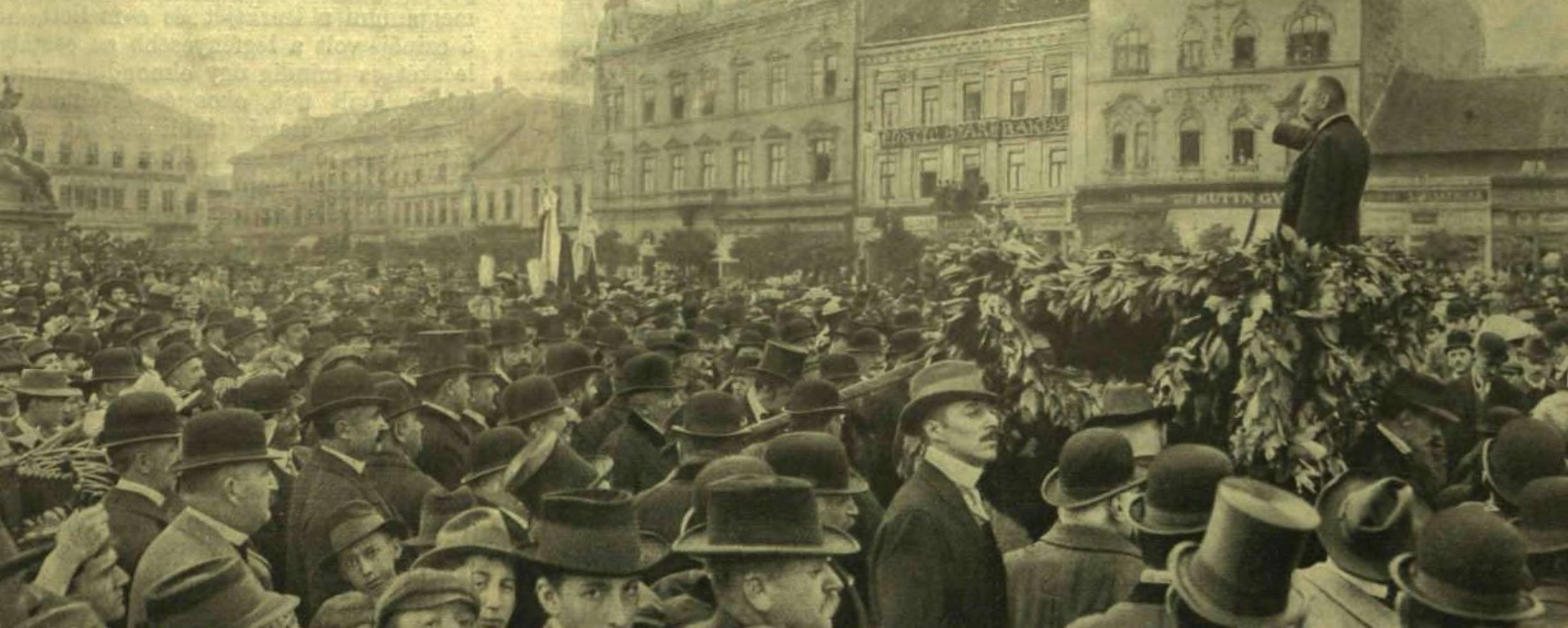
Tisza gives a speech in Arad in 1910

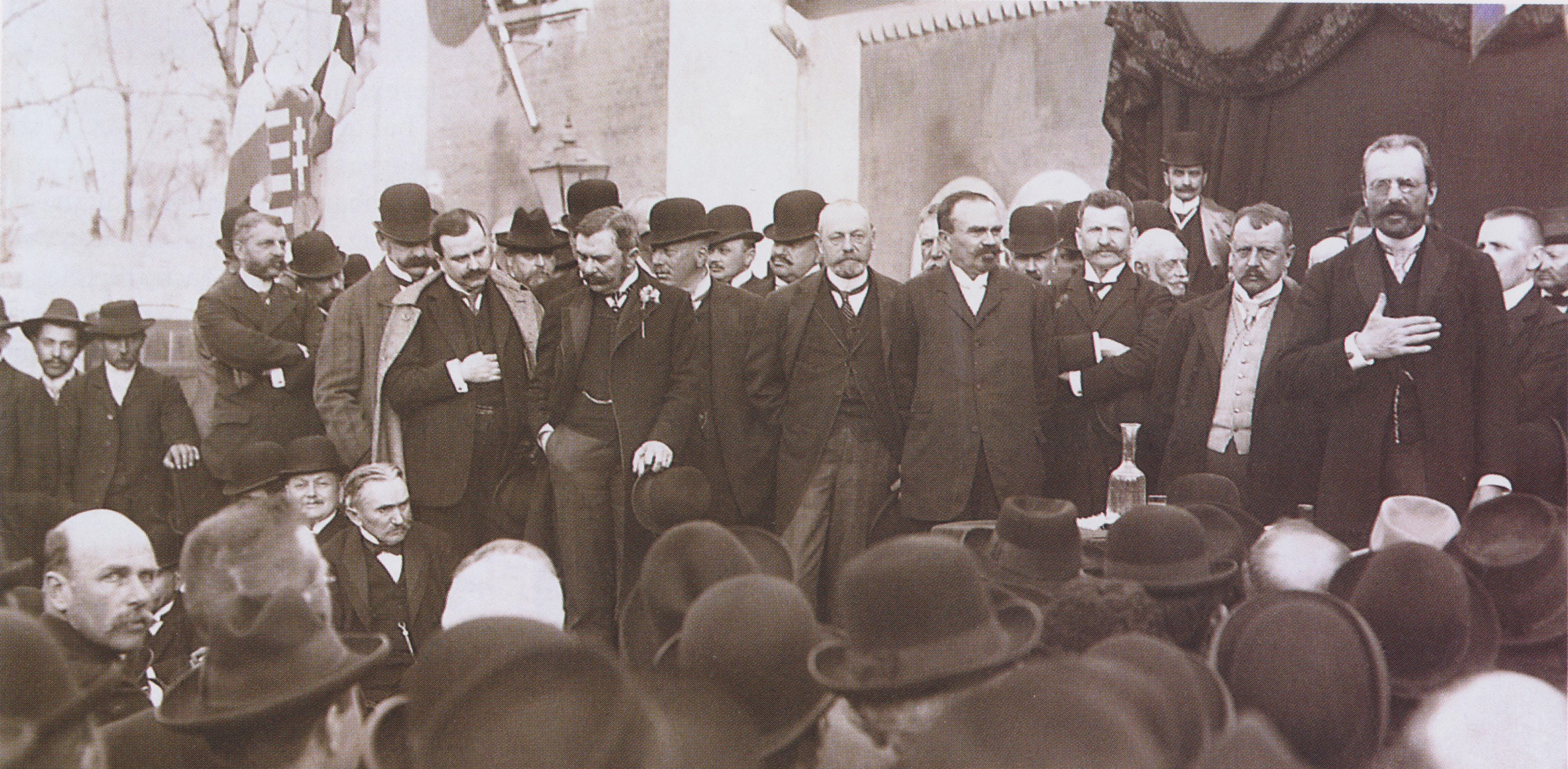
Tisza gives an electoral speech in Sopron in April 1910

On 19 February 1910, Tisza established the National Party of Work (Nemzeti Munkapárt) which subsequently won the election of 1910. This time around he had no intention of forming a government, primarily due to his conflict with Franz Ferdinand who sought to centralise the Habsburg monarchy with universal suffrage. Tisza opposed this initiative, as he believed that this might lead to the weakening of the Hungarian supremacy over ethnic minorities. In addition, he claimed that demagogues — i.e., "politicians of communists and agrarian socialist movements" might manipulate peasants to put the politicians into power that are not in favour of democratic government. Although Tisza had the emperor's support, he feared that the faults of his first prime ministership could be repeated and therefore called on Károly Khuen-Héderváry to form the new government. However, despite the fact that Tisza was not in office as prime minister again until 1913, his power and influence on the ruling party was completely absolute.

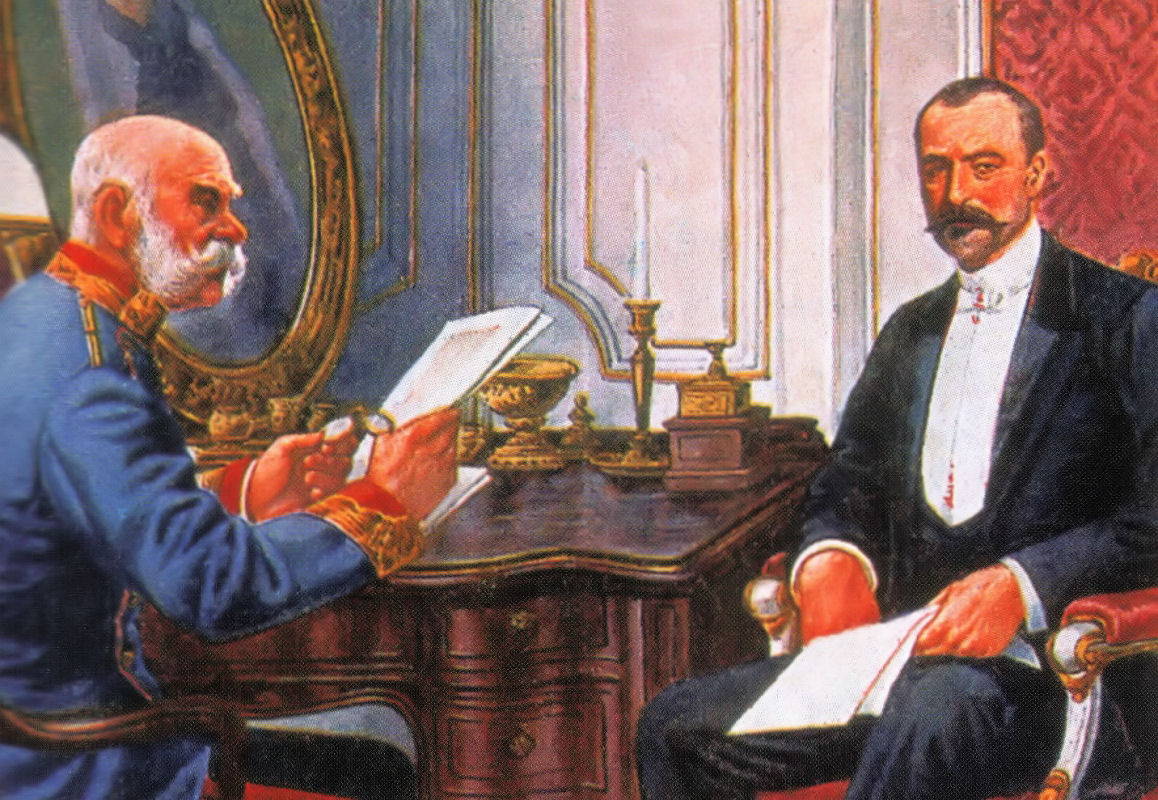
István Tisza (right) with Emperor-King Francis Joseph

==== Speaker of the House and Act of Protection ====
István Tisza in 1914

As Speaker of the House of Representatives from 22 May 1912 to 12 June 1913 Tisza supported the reform of the common Austro-Hungarian army to enhance the military power of the dual monarchy. Tisza considered army reform essential (increasing the number of recruits and raising expenditures) because he believed that delaying it would weaken the military position of the Austro-Hungarian monarchy and undermine Hungary's security. However the opposition was fighting for more Hungarian interests (i.e., use of the Magyar language in the army). Tisza and his party refused the idea of universal suffrage. According to his threatening prediction, the majority votes of peasants – manipulated by primitive demagogues – would result in the domination of groups whose goals are just contrary to the ideals of metropolitan intellectuals and socialists who call for democracy. The Socialists strongly opposed his acts and decided to organize a protest march. Socialist agents organised a worker rebellion on 22 May 1912 (Blood-Red Thursday), calling for Tisza to resign as President of the House and calling for universal suffrage. On the next day, the protesters and workers marched toward the Parliament building, meanwhile the events transformed to violence, protesters broke the shop windows in the surrounding streets, automobiles and tramcars were damaged by the masses. However, the protesters were stopped by the storm of hussar cavalry units, and they were arrested by the police. Six people died in the clashes, nearly two hundred were injured and three hundred were arrested. This event became known as "Blood-Red Thursday" in the contemporary press and later in the history books.

Tisza tried to solve the question of ethnic minorities based on a clerical approach (like the representation of Orthodox and Greek Catholic Church in The Upper House of the parliament).

He was convinced that the challenging foreign situation called for military preparation and he strongly pushed against opposition obstruction. He did not allow the opposition to speak up regarding rules of House of Parliament. Referring to an act of 1848, he called for the police force to force out numerous opposition representatives. He managed to pass the Act of Protection, resulting in the removal of some members of the opposition party.

As a result, Gyula Kovács, an opposition party representative, tried to assassinate Tisza in the Parliament Building on 7 June 1912. His shots missed and the marks are still visible in the Hungarian Parliament Building to this day. With his last shot Kovács shot himself, but he survived. Tisza then continued the session.

=== Prime minister (second term, 1913–1917) ===
Tisza became prime minister of Hungary again on 7 June 1913.

==== Freedom of the press ====
Inspired by the Western European model, Tisza's cabinet introduced for the first time in the history of Hungarian journalism the legal category of defamation, libel and "scare-mongering", thus the press became actionable before the courts. Journalists and newspapers had to pay compensations for the victims of defamation and libel. Despite the fact that these institutions and laws worked well in Western Europe and in the United States, the contemporary Hungarian newspapers and journalists considered it as the violation of the Freedom of Speech and the Freedom of Press.

==== Croatia ====
Count István Tisza tried to solve the longstanding Hungarian-Croatian issue, namely to clarify the relationship; for this matter, he met Count Tivadar Pejácsevich, Count of Verovce, Croatian Ban, and a year later, Baron Lomnica, Ivan Skerlecz, the new Croatian Ban.

Tisza maintained his conciliatory position, promising to reestablish the Croatian Constitution, which had been suspended in May 1912. Tisza appointed his old family friend Baron Ivan Skerlecz, of Šokci origin, as the new ban of Croatia. Negotiations between the Croatian representatives and Tisza bore fruit and allowed the restitution of the Croatian constitutional government in November 1913.

==== Foreign policy and World War I ====
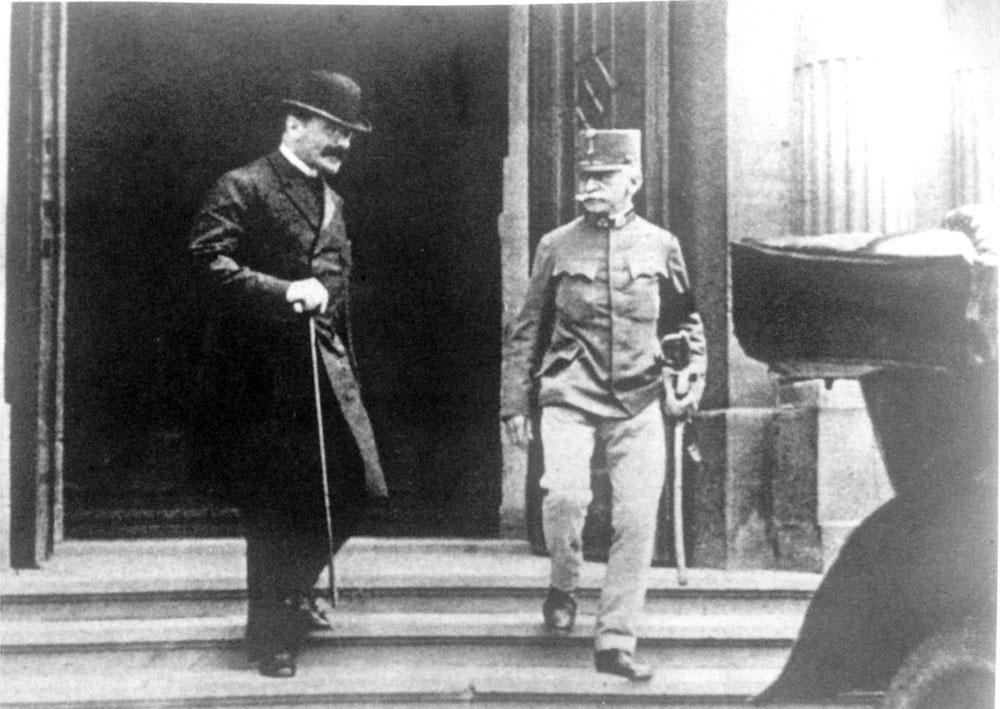
Tisza and Hötzendorf left Vienna after three days of fierce debate.

A few days before the assassination of Franz Ferdinand in Sarajevo, which resulted in World War I, Tisza supported a strong stand against Serbia. However, after the assassination he was against going to war against Serbia, a rare view in Austria-Hungary. He knew the army's strength, and he was afraid that with the increase of more Slavic territories the equilibrium inside the monarchy would be upset. Moreover, he was afraid that Romania would seize Transylvania. However he came to realize that ending the alliance with Germany would have meant the end of Austria-Hungary as a Great Power, so he gave in and supported the war. He then became a relentless supporter of the war until its end.

Tisza believed Romania to be an enemy from the beginning. He was afraid that if Romania attacked Hungary then the Romanians in Transylvania would revolt against Hungary. In the end, 40,000 soldiers were moved to protect Transylvania.

The very existence of the dual monarchy came into question during the war. Tisza wanted to solidify the government. He appointed Baron Stephan Burián von Rajecz who planned to increase the prestige of the monarchy and to get parity with Germany but also to negotiate peace with the help of the Americans. But Berlin alienated the United States by announcing full submarine warfare in 1917, with the goal of sinking American ships bringing supplies to the Allies.

Towards the end of the war, Tisza had wanted to give the Serbs and Bosnians autonomy within Austria-Hungary. As a homo regius ("king's man"), he went to Sarajevo to attempt this, but they demanded independent states. By late October 1918, the dissolution of the dual monarchy and the surrender of Germany were imminent and there was nothing that foreign minister Burián (who was still in that role) could do to change the course of history. Under dualist Austro-Hungarian state, the Emperor held foreign policy and military affairs in his hands, and his influence in Hungary was, by Tisza's words, no more than "a weak guiding influence". However the Western politicians and journalists of the time might have thought that, while Hungary and the Hungarian parliament seemed stable under Tisza's leadership (due to the supermajority of his party), Austria was weakened by a series of domestic political crises and the war had broken out with an attack on Serbia, which directly bordered with kingdom of Hungary. After German Emperor Wilhelm II and German General Erich Ludendorff, István Tisza was often described by the Western press to be the "most hated enemy", as he was considered the third most important man of the Central Powers in 1918.

===== His view on war against Serbia =====
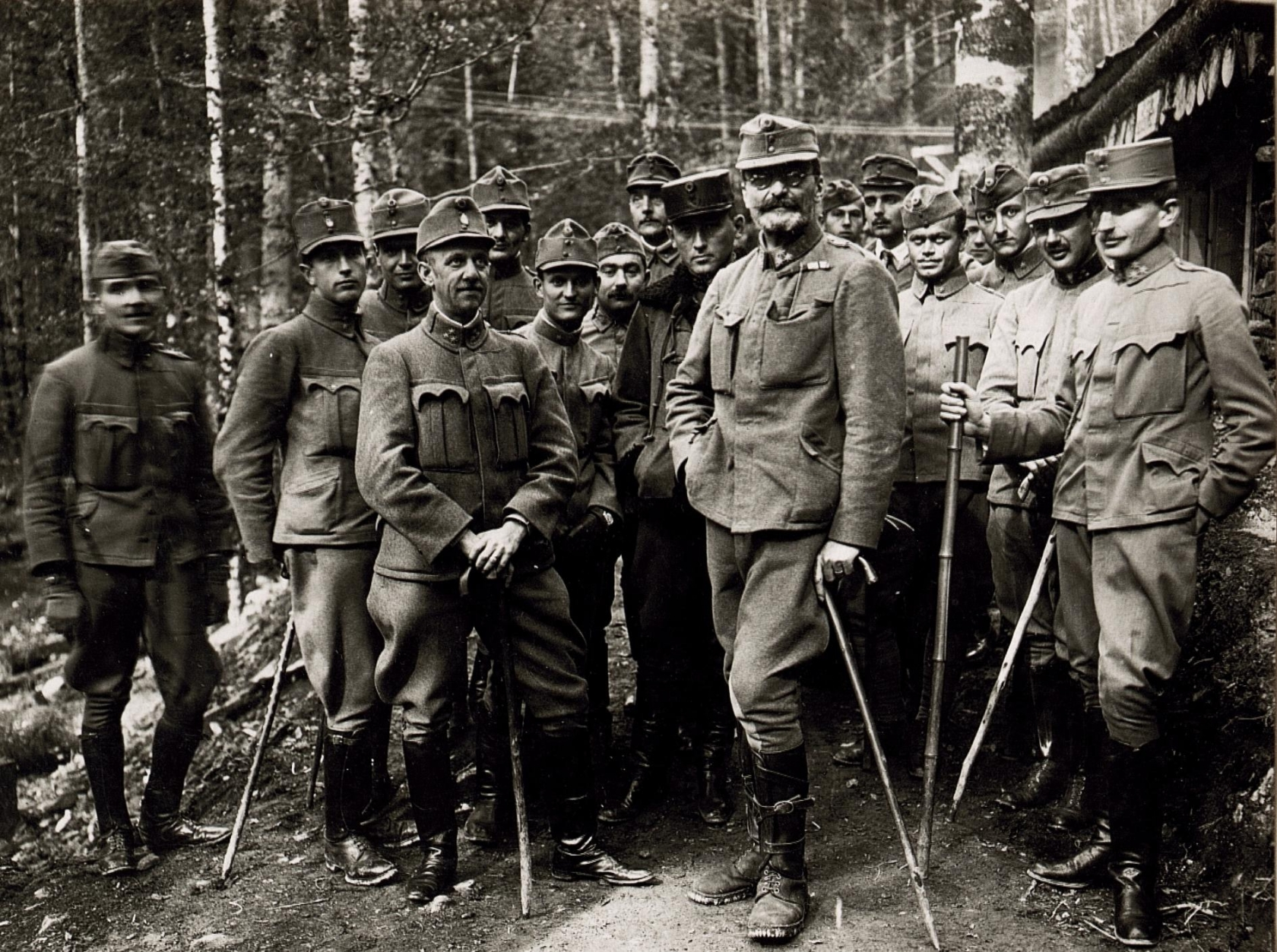
István Tisza served on the Italian front between 1917 and 1918, where he had opportunity to experience the circumstances and dangers of trench warfare on a daily basis

Tisza opposed the expansion of the empire on the Balkan (see Bosnian crisis in 1908), because "the Dual Monarchy already had too many Slavs", which would further threaten the integrity of the Dual Monarchy.

In March 1914, Tisza wrote a memorandum to Emperor Francis Joseph. His letter had a strongly apocalyptic, predictive and embittered tone. He used the expression "Weltkrieg" (meaning World War) - a term hitherto unknown in German language - in his letter. "It is my firm conviction that Germany's two neighbors [Russia and France] are carefully proceeding with military preparations, but will not start the war so long as they have not attained a grouping of the Balkan states against us that confronts the monarchy with an attack from three sides and pins down the majority of our forces on our eastern and southern front."

On the day of the assassination of Franz Ferdinand, Tisza immediately traveled to Vienna where he met Minister of Foreign Affairs Count Berchtold and Army Commander Conrad von Hötzendorf. They proposed to solve the dispute with arms, attacking Serbia. Tisza proposed to give the government of Serbia time to take a stand as to whether it was involved in the organisation of the murder and proposed a peaceful resolution, arguing that the international situation would settle soon. Returning to Budapest, he wrote to Franz Joseph saying he would not take any responsibility for the armed conflict because there was no proof that Serbia had plotted the assassination. Tisza opposed a war with Serbia, stating that any war with the Serbs was bound to trigger a war with Russia and hence a general European war. He thought that even a successful Austro-Hungarian war would be disastrous for the integrity of the Kingdom of Hungary, where Hungary would be the next victim of Austrian politics. After a successful war against Serbia, Tisza adumbrated a possible Austrian military attack against the Kingdom of Hungary, where the Austrians want to break up the territory of Hungary. He did not trust in the Italian alliance, due to the political aftermath of the Second Italian War of Independence. He also felt the threat of Romania and Bulgaria after the Balkan Wars and was afraid of Romanian attack from the east, while Austro-Hungarian forces had to fight against the Russian Empire and maybe against Italy. He was also not sure about the stand of the Germans. Germany's stand was of ultimate importance due to the security of the state.

During a conversation between Franz Joseph and Conrad von Hötzendorf, Hötzendorf asked, "If Germany's reply is that they are on our side, do we engage in war with Serbia?" The emperor replied, "Then yes", "But what if they reply differently?", "Then the Monarchy will be alone".

===== Council of Joint Ministers meeting =====
On 7 July, the Council of Joint Ministers debated Austria-Hungary's course of action. The most hawkish on the Council considered a surprise attack on Serbia. Count Tisza persuaded the Council that demands should be placed on Serbia before mobilization to provide a proper "juridical basis for a declaration of war".

At that meeting of the Crown Council, all involved were in full favour of war except Tisza. Tisza warned that any attack on Serbia "would, as far as can humanly be foreseen, lead to an intervention by Russia and hence a world war". The rest of the participants debated about whether Austria should just launch an unprovoked attack or issue an ultimatum to Serbia with demands so stringent that it was bound to be rejected. Austrian Prime Minister Stürgkh warned Tisza that if Austria did not launch a war, its "policy of hesitation and weakness" would cause Germany to abandon Austria-Hungary as an ally. All present, except Tisza, finally agreed that Austria-Hungary should present an ultimatum designed to be rejected.

The Council agreed on putting harsh demands on Serbia but could not reach consensus on how harsh. Except for Count Tisza, the Council intended to make such harsh demands that their rejection would be very probable. Tisza held out for demands that, while harsh, would not appear impossible to meet. Both views were sent to the Emperor on 8 July. The Emperor's opinion was that the gap in opinion could most likely be bridged. An initial set of demands was drafted during the Council meeting.

Kaiser Wilhelm II supported the war, promised to neutralize a Romanian attack, and put pressure on Sofia. After this, Tisza still sought a peaceful solution, but most of all he wanted to wait for the result of the official investigation into the assassination. The only proposal of Tisza, which was accepted, was that the Monarchy should not annihilate Serbia completely in order to avoid Russian support for Serbia. The council finally addressed an ultimatum to the Serbian government and immediately commenced mobilisation of troops. It took the week of 7–14 July to persuade Tisza to support war.

===== After the ultimatum =====
After sending the ultimatum, his view changed. The ultimatum had expired after 48 hours, so Tisza wrote: "it was a difficult decision to take a stand to propose war, but now I am firmly convinced of its necessity". He was, however, still opposed to the annexation of Serbia to the Monarchy, but failed. On 4 August 1914 Russia, Germany, Britain and France also entered the war, enlarging it to a world war.

Tisza did not resign as prime minister, as he thought that, with his connections in Vienna, remaining in this position was the best way he could represent Hungarian interests inside Austria-Hungary. Moreover, his resignation would have sent a message of weakness to the Entente at the outbreak of war.

His initial opposition to the conflict, only became public after the end of World War 1, on 17 October 1918, when he spoke in the Parliament. He said, "the Monarchy and the Hungarian nation were longing for peace all the way until there were proofs that the enemy was systematically trying to humiliate and destroy us as soon as possible (...) As we have found proofs that the Serbian government took part in organising the assassination, we could not but address an ultimatum to Serbia ... where we stipulated that the war is preventive."

==== Resign ====
During the war, the reformists became more and more powerful, but he continued to oppose them. At the time, Tisza was seen as forcing the continuation of the war and was losing a great deal of support. As the war progressed, he became increasingly opposed to the powerful reform efforts of the opposition, which sought to expand suffrage and implement series of social reforms. With the death of Franz Joseph, István Tisza lost his most significant political patron. His resistance extended to the moderate reform policies of King Charles IV, who ascended the throne on 30 December 1916, following the death of Franz Joseph. He opposed the ideas of the new Emperor, Karl I, and was asked to resign; he did so on 23 May 1917.

As the party founder, István Tisza had enormous authority in the National Parti of Work, which made up the supermajority of the parliament, and therefore had full control over Hungarian politics in parliament even though he no longer held a prime ministerial or any governmental position. He was able to force his successor pm. Móric Esterházy to resign, then controlling the policies of pm. Sándor Wekerle, who succeeded him.

===== Service in the front =====
The 57-year-old Tisza joined the 2nd Hussar Regiment of Hungary - which served on the Italian front - as a hussar colonel, and personally led his hussar units during the attacks.

Tisza at the front: "Tisza already felt the not too friendly atmosphere surrounding him at the first days of his joining up to the regiment and at first he tried to ease the general mood by informal behavior. (...) He made an effort from the beginning to use an informal tone both with the staff of officers and - of course within the limits of the service regulations - with the rank and file. In order to get to know his fellow officers better, he invited some young officers to his table every day. In this way he tried to establish better personal relations with his environment. The troops had slowly started to recognize him as a "tough to those above and humane to those below" kind of commander. He distributed his tobacco provisions among the officers and he used his commander pay to improve the catering of the troops, and these of course left a good impression on everybody."

Tisza's paternalistic attitude towards his subordinates also manifested itself in civil law cases: he helped with his personal influence in getting done of those petitions what he considered fair, he interceded with notaries, judges, alispáns (deputy-lieutenants) for advancing the home affairs of his men, due to this both the officers and the troops more and more came to like and embrace him. Tisza himself also felt that the front service had been quite useful and productive since on the one hand he could personally experience the dangers of the battleground an on the other hand-at least he was thinking that way and there is a lot of truth in it-he could truly become familiar with the real nature of the simple, peasant origin soldiers. He wrote about peasant soldiers in this way in a letter to Archduke Joseph: "I’ve got to truly know the ordinary [peasants] people now. This is the most extraordinary race of the world that can only be loved and respected. How unfortunate that the political intelligentia doesn’t do anything else, just corrupts this great and God-blessed people."

== Assassination attempts ==
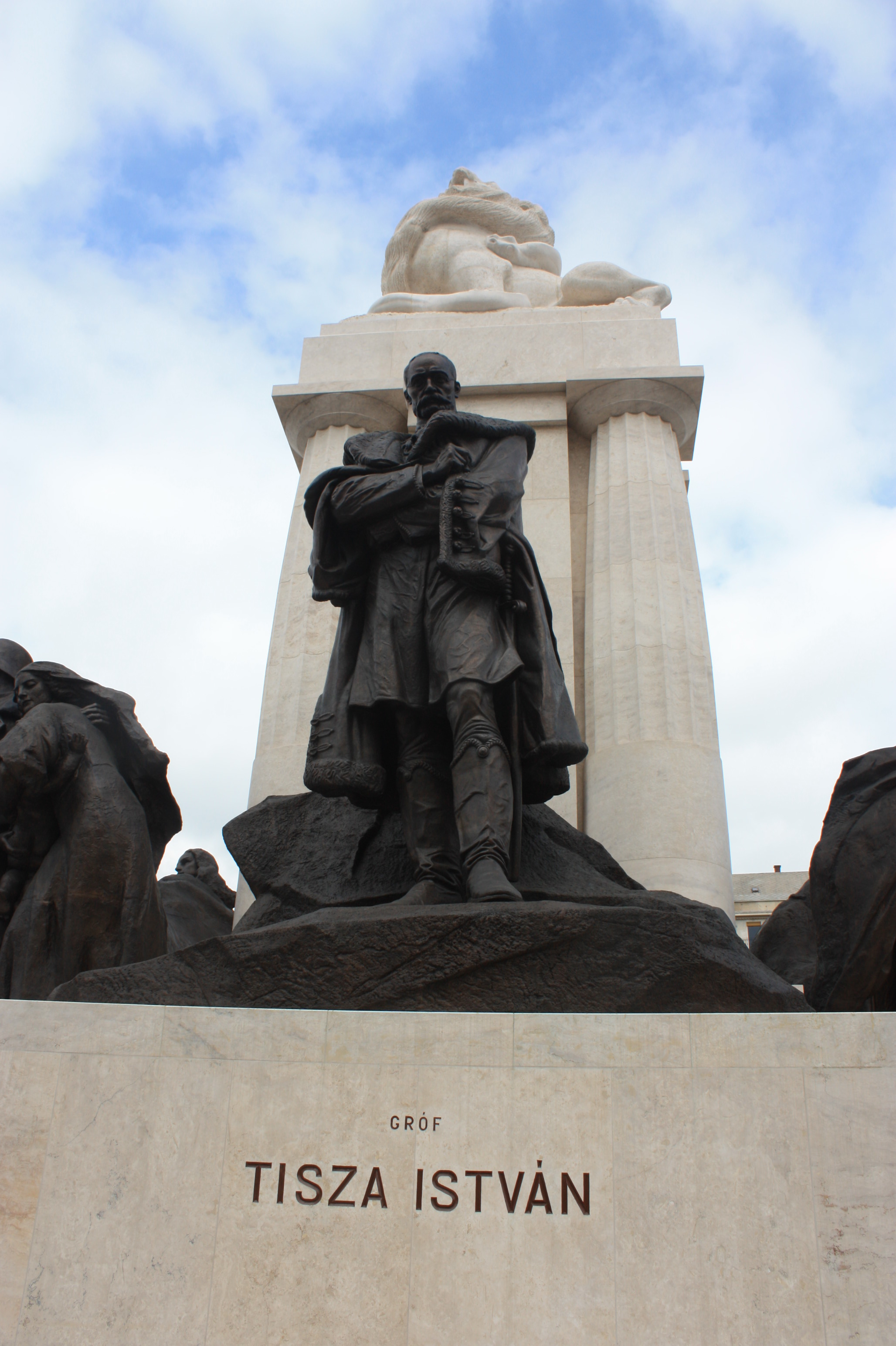
Monument to Tisza István outside the Budapest Parliament building

For many, he was the representative of the war policy in the Monarchy, so he was an assassination target. The fourth assassination attempt against him was successful.

The first attempt was made in the Hungarian parliament in 1912 by Gyula Kovács, an opposition politician. He shot two bullets, but missed Tisza. Kovács was arrested by the police, but he was acquitted by the court, the justification was "temporary insanity".

The second was made by a soldier when Tisza was returning from the front line during the war. The bullet missed him.

The third attempt came on 16 October 1918 when János Lékai, a member of the society Galilei-circle and an anti-military group led by Ottó Korvin, tried to kill Tisza while he was leaving the Hungarian Parliament, but the revolver malfunctioned and Tisza managed to flee. The assassin was sent to prison but was released after 15 days during the Chrysanthemum Revolution.

== Death ==
The fourth and successful assassination attempt came on 31 October 1918, when soldiers broke into his home, the Róheim Villa in Budapest, Hermina út 35., (today the Villa is at nr. 45.) in front of his wife and his grandniece. Some sources suggest these were disgruntled deserters who blamed Tisza for having started the war.

“Count István Tisza, a victim of bloody freedom”.

“On the morning of the murder, a military officer and a man in civilian clothes appeared at the villa at 35 Hermina Street. They asked to be admitted. Tisza received them in his study. - What do you want? The civilian replied: - Are you hiding that pig Czech prosecutor who is representing the prosecution against me? - I am not hiding anyone. - The strangers soon left… In all likelihood, they were only conducting a preliminary reconnaissance to see if Tisza, who was rumored in the city to be absent from Pest, was at home.” “During the day, a dense crowd gathered on the outer Hermina Road, near the villa. At about a quarter to six in the evening, eight goats climbed over the high iron-barred fence and crept across the garden lawn to the house. They entered through the back door. The gendarmes assigned to guard István Tisza were peacefully disarmed and forced their way into the villa’s hall. The valet blocked their way. István Tisza, his wife and niece, Countess Denise Almássy, came out at the noise. Tisza had a revolver in her hand. The soldiers reproached her: - We have been at war for five years because of you… You are the reason for the destruction of the country! - You have always been a scoundrel! - Then they shouted at her to put down the revolver. - I will not put it down, you came with weapons too! - Put it down, shouted a lanky blond man who looked to be in his thirties. - I will not! - Stand aside women! - We won't! They replied. Tisza took a few steps back, put down his revolver. - So what do they want? - You're the reason for the war! - I know what happened, that so much blood was shed, but I'm not the reason. - I've been a soldier for four years. So many families have been lost because of your villainy. Live for it! - I'm not the reason[of this war]! - Stand aside women! No answer... - You brought this terrible disaster upon us, now the reckoning is here... Three shots were fired.

Tisza fell forward on the carpet. Two bullets hit him, one penetrating his stomach, the other his shoulder. The third hit Denise Almássy in the face. - I'm finished, - said Tisza, it had to be that way. The soldiers hurried away while their victim was in the throes of death. They don't know what unit they belonged to.

=== Aftermath ===
Subsequently, Mihály Károlyi's government initiated an investigation but the identity of the killers was not confirmed at that time, however, family members had identified individuals that they said were the killers.

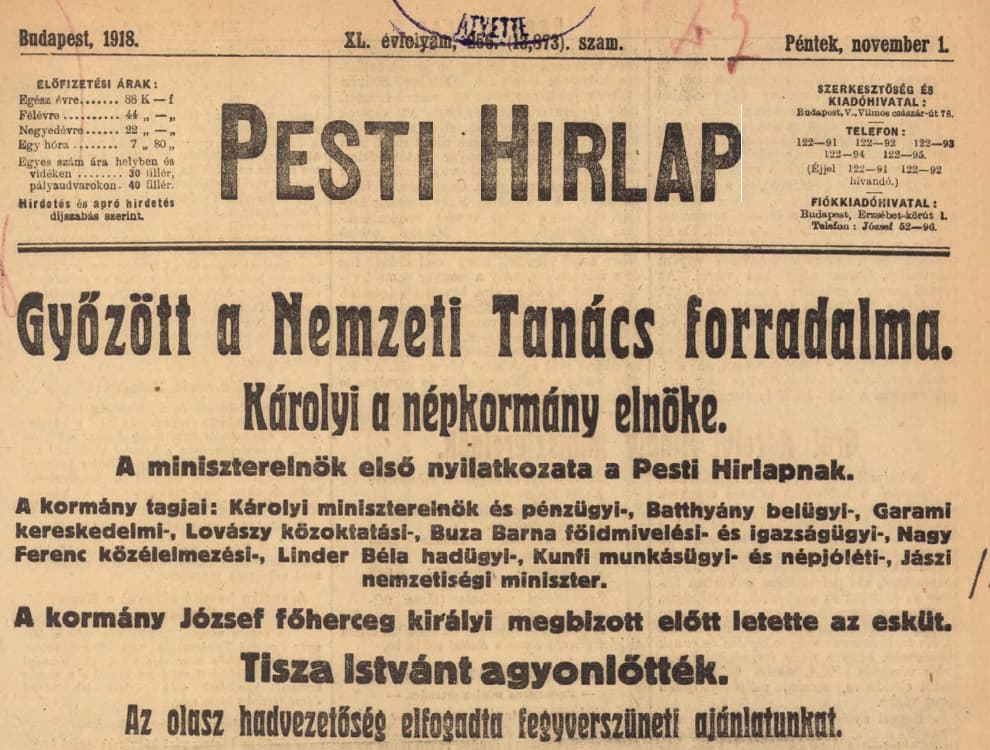
First page-one title about assassination of István Tisza Pesti Hírlap 01-11-1918

In the trial that followed the fall of the Communist regime and ended on 6 October 1921, Judge István Gadó established the guilt of Pál Kéri, who was exchanged with the Soviet Union; József Pogány, aka John Pepper, who fled to Vienna, then Moscow and the USA; István Dobó; Tivadar Horváth Sanovics, who also fled; Sándor Hüttner, who died in a prison hospital in 1923; and Tibor Sztanykovszky, who was the only one to serve his 18-year sentence, being released in 1938.

Famous psychoanalyst Sigmund Freud, who knew both politicians personally, wrote about the assassination of István Tisza and the appointment of Mihály Károlyi as new prime minister of Hungary:

I was certainly no adherent of the ancien régime, but it seems doubtful to me whether it is a sign of political shrewdness to beat to death the smartest of the many counts [Count István Tisza] and to make the stupidest one [Count Mihály Károlyi] president. — The Correspondence of Sigmund Freud and Sándor Ferenczi, Volume 2

== Personal life ==
He married his first degree cousin, Ilona Tisza de Borosjenő. They had two children together.

- István (1886–1918)
- Juliska (1888-1894)

His son, István died of Spanish flu on 5 November 1918, five days after the death of the father.

Tisza was a "champion duellist" who "had fought more duels than any man in Europe and had never once been seriously wounded". Having been taught by "the best masters in Germany, France and Italy", he was equally adept with sword or pistol, despite (by 1913) having had a cataract operation on one of his eyes and wearing "think horn-rimmed spectacles". In January 1913, he fought Mihály Károlyi in a 34-bout duel with cavalry sabres which lasted an hour until Tisza cut Károlyi's arm and the seconds ended the duel. A week later he fought Aladár Széchenyi, again with sabres - the duel lasted one bout, ending with Tisza wounding Széchenyi with "a long cut across the head". On about 20 August 1913, Tisza fought György Pallavacini (son-in-law and supporter of Opposition leader Gyula Andrássy) at a Budapest fencing school in a duel with "heavy cavalry sabres" and "only slight protection of the body was allowed". After nine bouts, both duellists were bleeding from cuts to their foreheads, and the seconds declared both principals unable to continue - "[t]he two men shook hands, then embraced, kissing each other on both cheeks, and declared themselves reconciled."

== Honors ==
A István Tisza postage stamp was issued by Hungary on 1 July 1932 in the Famous Hungarians series.

=== Orders and decorations ===
- Sweden: Commander Grand Cross of the Order of Vasa, 1904
- Austria-Hungary: Grand Cross of the Order of St. Stephen, 1912; in Diamonds, 1916

== Works and Publications ==
=== Historical Studies ===
- About Barras' memoirs
- From Sadowa to Sedan
- Wertheimer's Andrássy
- European cruise in the 17th century
- A few more words about Benedict's tragedy
- Historical materialism in the Balkans

=== Electoral Studies ===
- Preface to the volume about the political franchise
- The Austrian election
- The Austrian House of Representatives
- The result of the German election
- Hieronymi on the political franchise
- Electoral Reform and Industrial Workers
- On the verge of electoral reform
- General suffrage and the dynasty

=== Economics ===
- Theory of tax evasion (1882)
- Hungarian agricultural policy (1883)
- The Agricultural Question (1887)
- American competition on the European wheat market (1888)
- Sorting of our currency (1890)
- About the Budget of 1890 (1890)
- The Budget of 1891 (1890)
- The Budget of 1892 (1892)
- Currency Exchange & Gold Pricing (1893)
- Gábor Baross and his system (1894)
- A few more words about Baross's railway policy (1894)
- Our export on the Austrian railways and the customs union
- About the inflation
- 20,000 crowns

=== Other studies and dissertations ===
- Public status of Rijeka (1883)
- Once again on the public law status of Rijeka (1883)
- The Fight for Parliamentarism: Speeches by Count István Tisza (1904)
- Gyula Andrássy on art
- Agnosticism
- About Károly Hieronymi
- Austrian work on the 67th anniversary of the Compromise
- Pietreich on Protective Law
- Compulsory insurance and local government
- Crisis of the British House of Lords
- One word or two about parliamentarianism
- Nation and society
- Gyula Wlassics in the 1867: XII. t.-c. legal nature
- A few words in response to Ödön Polner
- A little browsing in the field of English parliamentarism
- A little controversy
- Notice to the article by Mihály Réz
- Approach of Austrian Germans
- Nationalization and local government
- The impact of war on the nation

== See also ==
- Austro-Hungarian entry into World War I
- Hoyos Mission

== Notes ==
Political offices
Preceded by Károly Khuen-Héderváry	Prime Minister of Hungary; 1903–1905	Succeeded by Géza Fejérváry
Preceded by Károly Khuen-Héderváry	Minister of the Interior; 1903–1905	Succeeded by József Kristóffy
Preceded by Károly Khuen-Héderváry	Minister besides the King; 1903–1904	Succeeded by Károly Khuen-Héderváry
Preceded by Lajos Návay	Speaker of the House of Representatives; 1912–1913	Succeeded by Pál Beőthy
Preceded by László Lukács	Prime Minister of Hungary; 1913–1917	Succeeded by Móric Esterházy
Preceded by Gejza Josipović	Minister of Croatian Affairs; Acting; 1913	Succeeded by Teodor Pejačević
Preceded by Teodor Pejačević	Minister of Croatian Affairs; Acting; 1914–1916	Succeeded by Imre Hideghéthy
Preceded by István Burián	Minister besides the King; Acting; 1915	Succeeded by Ervin Roszner
