= Pál Beőthy =

Hungarian politician (1866–1921)

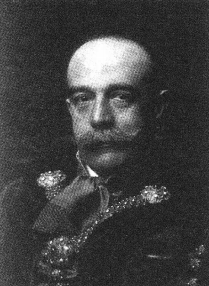

Speaker of the House of Representatives
- In office 13 June 1913 – 28 June 1917
- Preceded by: István Tisza
- Succeeded by: Károly Szász

Personal details
- Born: 20 June 1866 Nagymarjapuszta, Kingdom of Hungary
- Died: 15 September 1921 (aged 55) Budapest, Kingdom of Hungary
- Party: Party of National Work
- Profession: soldier, politician

Pál Beőthy de Bessenyő et Örvend (Beöthy; 20 June 1866 – 15 September 1921) was a Hungarian jurist, soldier and politician, who served as Speaker of the House of Representatives between 1913 and 1917.

Political offices
| Preceded by István Tisza | Speaker of the House of Representatives; 1913–1917 | Succeeded by Károly Szász |
