= Croatian-Hungarian Party =

Croatian-Hungarian Party Hrvatsko-ugarska stranka
- Founded: 1841
- Dissolved: 1918
- Ideology: Magyarization; Monarchism

Croatian-Hungarian Party (Croatian: Hrvatsko-ugarska stranka) was the name of a 19th-century political party in the Habsburg Kingdom of Croatia and the Kingdom of Croatia-Slavonia which advocated closer ties between Croatia and Hungary. It was officially named Horvatsko-vugerska stranka in 1841 when it participated in the council of Varaždin County. It was one of the two parties in the 1843 session of the Croatian Parliament. It temporarily ceased to function in 1849, following the Revolutions of 1848; when it was reconstituted in 1860, it was named the Unionist Party (Unionistička stranka), and entered the Parliament in 1861. It was also known as the National Constitutional Party (Narodna ustavna stranka). Because they advocated Magyarization policies, their political adversaries gave them a well-known nickname of mađaroni.

Several 19th-century Ministers of Croatian Affairs of Hungary and Bans of Croatia were members of the party. Their main rivals were the Party of Rights and the People's Party.

== See also ==
- July victims

== Sources ==
- Horvat, Rudolf (1906). Najnovije doba hrvatske povjesti (in Croatian). Matica hrvatska. (Wikisource)
