= List of members of the National Assembly of Hungary (1910–1918) =

National Assembly of Hungary (1910–1918) Országgyűlés

Type
- Type: bicameral
- Houses: House of Magnates, House of Representatives

History
- Founded: 23 June 1910
- Disbanded: 16 November 1918 (8 years, 146 days)
- Preceded by: Members 1906–1910
- New session started: Members 1920–1922

Structure
- Seats: 413
- Political groups: Government (256): National Party of Work (256); Opposition (157): Independence Kossuth Party of '48 (54); Justh Party of Independence and '48 (44); Independent '67ers (19); Catholic People's Party (13); Independent '48ers (10); Romanian National Party (5); National Independence Farmer Party for '48 (4); Slovak National Party (3); Civic Democratic Party (2); Hungarian Independent Socialist Peasant Party (1); National Christian Socialist Party (1); Independent moderate (1)

Elections
- Last election: 29 April–8 May 1906
- Next election: January 1920–October 1921

Meeting place
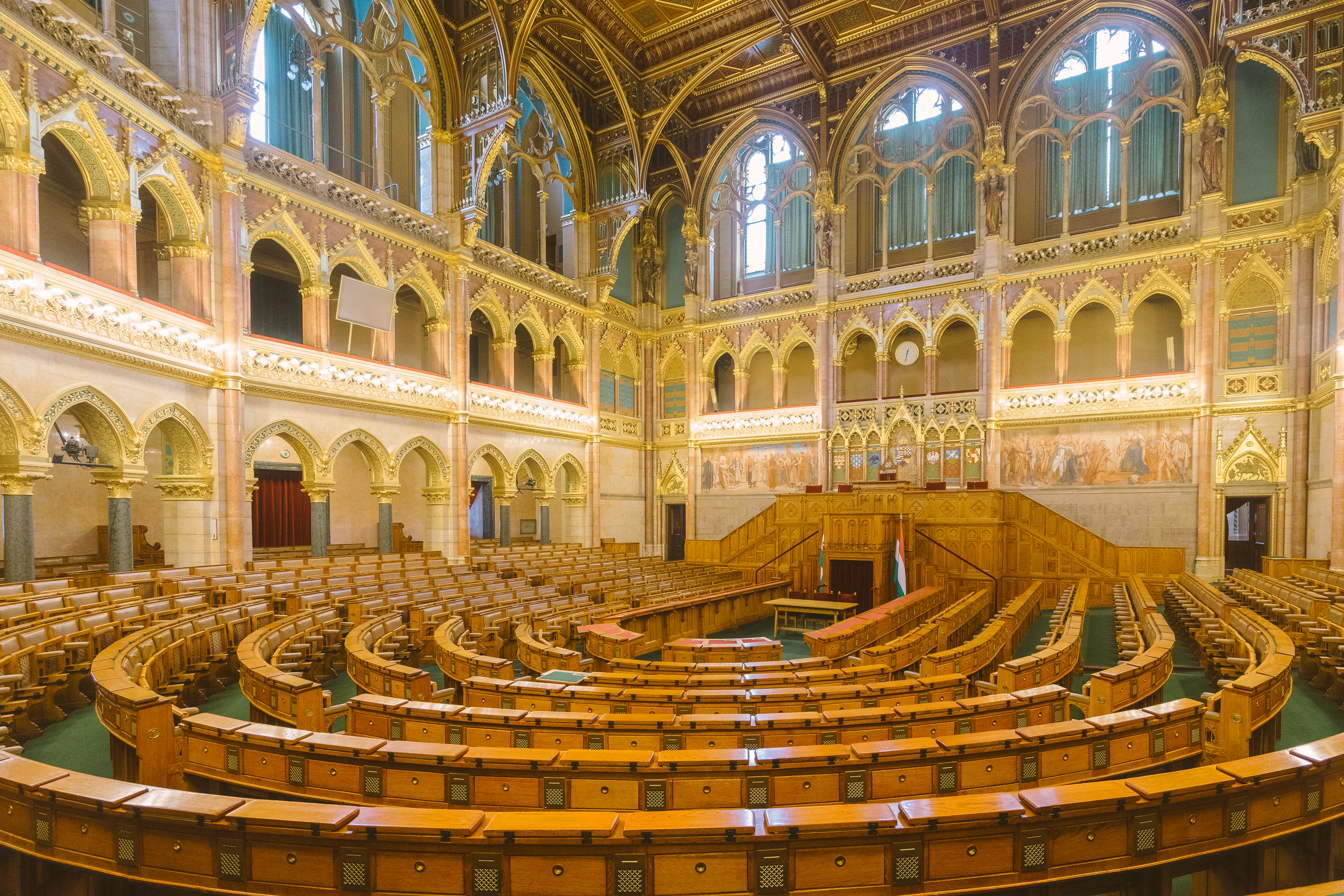
- Hungarian Parliament Building; Lajos Kossuth Square 1 Budapest, H-1055; Hungary

The list of members of the National Assembly of Hungary (1910–1918) is the list of members of the National Assembly - the bicameral legislative body of Hungary - according to the outcome of the Hungarian parliamentary election of 1910. The members of the new National Assembly were installed on June 23, 1910. There has been a sizable number of mutations since due to the particular nature of the Hungary constitutional system. New members are supplied from their party lists so the resignation of individual members' seats does not change the balance of power in the National Assembly.

== Officials ==
=== Speaker of the National Assembly ===
- Albert Berzeviczy (June 30, 1910 – November 7, 1911)
- Lajos Návay (9 November 1911 – 21 May 1912)
- Count István Tisza (22 May 1912 – 10 June 1913)
- Pál Beőthy (13 June 1913 – 28 June 1917)
- Károly Szász (3 July 1917 – 16 November 1918)

=== Deputy Speakers of the National Assembly ===
- Ferenc Kabos (June 30, 1910 – November 16, 1918)
- Lajos Návay (June 30, 1910 – November 16, 1918)

=== Recorders ===
- Márton Lovászy (June 30, 1910 – November 16, 1918)
- László Hammersberg (June 30, 1910 – November 16, 1918)
- Félix Szinyei-Merse (June 30, 1910 – November 16, 1918)
- György Rudnyánszky (June 30, 1910 – November 16, 1918)
- Zoltán Vermes (June 30, 1910 – November 16, 1918)
- László Nyegre (June 30, 1910 – November 16, 1918)

=== First Officer ===
- József Angyal (June 30, 1910 – November 16, 1918)

=== Father of the House ===
- József Madarász (June 23, 1910 – June 30, 1910)

== Composition ==
Affiliation	Members	
Affiliation	23 June 1910	16 November 1918
National Party of Work	256	247
Independence Kossuth Party of '48	54	0
Justh Party of Independence and '48	44	0
Independent '67ers	19	11
Catholic People's Party	13	15
Independent '48ers	10	8
Romanian National Party	5	5
National Independence Farmer Party for '48	4	6
Slovak National Party	3	2
Civic Democratic Party	2	2
Hungarian Independent Socialist Peasant Party	1	0
National Christian Socialist Party	1	1
Independent moderate	1	4
United Party of Independence and '48	0	87
Constitutional Party of '48	0	10
Károlyi Party of Independence and '48	0	9
National Constitution Party	0	4
Independent Saxons	0	1
Total number of seats	413	412

- One seat remained vacant after 1914

== Members of the National Assembly ==
=== National Party of Work ===
- László Almásy
- Olivér Almay
- Tivadar Andrits
- József Almay
- Géza Antal
- Lajos Badinyi
- Árpád Balásy
- Jenő Balogh elected on the place of Sándor Bethlen in 1911
- Gyula Baross
- Baron Emil Baumgartner elected on the place of Szilárd Burdia in 1915
- Lajos Bay
- Géza Beliczey elected on the place of József Kristóffy in 1913
- Sándor Benedek elected on the place of Géza Kubinyi in 1913, abdicated in 1914
- László Beőthy
- Pál Beőthy
- Albert Berzeviczy abdicated in 1917
- Count József Bethlen
- Count Pál Bethlen
- Count Sándor Bethlen died in 1910
- Béla Blanár abdicated in 1914
- Živko Bogdan died in 1913
- Lajos Borbély
- Baron Frigyes Born
- Lajos Bornemisza
- József Bölöny elected on the place of Count István Tisza in 1910
- Rudolf Brandsch
- Ernő Bródy
- Gyula Bujanovics abdicated in 1916
- Szilárd Burdia abdicated in 1915
- Aladár Burgyán died in 1917
- Károly Cherny
- János Ciocán died in 1915
- Frigyes Connert elected on the place of Karl Schmidt in 1917
- Kálmán Cziffra elected on the place of Péter Ercsey in 1913, abdicated in 1916
- László Czobor elected on the place of Hugó Heincz in 1911
- Count Gusztáv Csáky
- Mihály Csegezy
- György Csillaghy elected on the place of György Rudnyánszky in 1917
- Olivér Csontos elected on the place of Count Sámuel Teleki in 1916
- Pál Csúzy
- Ernő Dahinten died in 1914
- Baron Ernő Dániel
- Gábor Dániel abdicated in 1917
- Baron Lajos Dániel abdicated in 1913
- Pál Dániel
- Fülöp Darvai died in 1918
- Ferenc Darvas died in 1915
- Béla Deák elected on the place of István Vojnits in 1916
- Ernő Desbordes
- Imre Dióssy elected on the place of Vilmos Thuróczy in 1910
- Sándor Dobieczki
- Viktor Domahidy elected on the place of József Helmeczy in 1915
- Baron Géza Duka died in 1913
- Bogdan Dunđerski elected on the place of Đorđe Radovanovic in 1915
- Gedeon Dunđerski
- Péter Ercsey abdicated in 1913
- Sándor Erdély, Sr.
- Sándor Erdély, Jr.
- János Ertl
- János Evetovics elected on the place of Baron Dezső Gromon in 1912
- Árpád Falcione
- Pál Farkas
- Zoltán Farkas
- Ágoston Fazekas elected on the place of Lajos Holló in 1918
- Márton Fekete
- Kálmán Fodor
- Emil Fráter elected on the place of József Telegdi in 1916
- Nándor Fuss
- Baron Ferenc Gerliczy elected on the place of Baron Dezső Bánffy in 1911, died in 1914
- János Gethie elected on the place of János Ciocán in 1915
- Baron Imre Ghillány
- Baron Sándor Ghillány elected on the place of František Skyčák in 1914
- László Görgey elected on the place of Count Béla Serényi in 1910, died in 1911
- Gusztáv Gratz abdicated in 1917
- Károly Grecsák elected on the place of Count Viktor Issekutz in 1917
- Vilmos Gresskovics abdicated in 1912
- Baron Dezső Gromon died in 1912
- Gyula Gueth
- Guido Gündisch elected on the place of Rezső Schuller in 1917
- György Gündisch elected on the place of Vilmos Gresskovics in 1912
- Ferenc Hajós
- Kálmán Hajós
- Count József Haller
- Baron Richárd Hammerstein elected on the place of Pál Latinovits in 1915
- László Hámory
- Antal Hámos
- Elemér Hantos
- Baron János Harkányi elected on the place of Ernő Rónay in 1913
- Ernő Hatfaludy elected on the place of Baron Samu Inczédy in 1912, died in 1914
- Baron Lipót Haupt-Stummer elected on the place of Gusztáv Szulyovszky in 1914
- Imre Haydin died in 1912
- Samu Hazai elected on the place of Baron Gyula Rohonyi in 1911, abdicated in 1917
- Kálmán Hegedűs
- Lóránt Hegedüs
- Hugó Heincz died in 1910
- Antal Heinrich
- József Helmeczy died in 1915
- Ferenc Heltai abdicated in 1913
- Ferenc Herczeg
- Károly Hieronymi elected in Spišská Nová Ves and Bratislava too, abdicated on Spišská Nová Ves in 1910, died in 1911
- Zoltán Hindy elected on the place of Count Emil Széchenyi in 1917
- Károly Holitscher
- Attila Hollaky
- Géza Hoványi
- Károly Huszár, Sr.
- Károly Huszár, Jr. elected on the place of Gusztáv Kálmán in 1910
- József Illés elected on the place of László Nyegre in 1913, abdicated in 1917
- Lajos Ilosvay
- Baron Ádám Inczédy elected on the place of Ernő Hatfaludy in 1915
- Baron Samu Inczédy abdicated in 1912
- Viktor Issekutz died in 1917
- László Ivánka elected on the place of Alfonz Nyáry in 1916
- Ivan Ivanović elected on the place of Živko Bogdan in 1913
- Elemér Jakabffy
- Ferenc Jakabffy died in 1913
- Imre Jakabffy
- Géza Jákói
- János Janiga
- Béla Jankovich
- Vilmos Jaross elected on the place of István Kürthy in 1910
- Ödön Jónás
- Ferenc Kabós
- Gusztáv Kálmán elected in Esztergom, Cluj and Žilina too, but abdicated in 1910 about Esztergom and Žilina.
- Ernő Kammerer
- Lajos Karátson elected on the place of Lajos Láng in 1910
- Count Jenő Karátsonyi
- József Kazy
- Count Gyula Keglevich abdicated in 1914
- Tibor Kéler elected on the place of Aladár Burgyán in 1917
- Gyula Keltz abdicated in 1912
- Péter Kende died in 1917
- Géza Kenedi
- Count Károly Khuen-Héderváry died in 1918
- Ernő Kiss
- Count Kunó Klebelsberg elected on the place of Count Miklós Bánffy in 1917
- Lajos Kollár elected on the place of Albert Berzeviczy in 1917
- Dávid Konyovits
- Kristóf Kopár elected on the place of Márton Mártonffy in 1917
- Traugott Kopony
- Vilmos Koppony
- Péter Korkan elected on the place of Baron Géza Duka in 1913
- Miklós Kostyál
- Andor Kozma elected on the place of Baron Mihály Zsilinszky in 1910
- Hugó Krolopp
- Godofréd Kuales died in 1914
- Géza Kubinyi abdicated in 1913, elected on the place of Sándor Benedek in 1914
- István Kürthy abdicated in 1910
- Baron Lajos Kürty elected on the place of Count Béla Serényi in 1917
- Lajos Láng elected in Debrecen and Vršac too, abdicated on Vršac in 1910, died in 1918
- Mihály Láng elected on the place of Ferenc Justh in 1911
- Mihály László
- Pál Latinovits died in 1914
- Sándor Lator abdicated in 1913
- Count István Lázár
- Baron Lajos Lévay
- Ádám Lipcsey died in 1910
- Béla Lipthay
- Géza Lónyay died in 1917
- István Lónyay elected on the place of Gyula Rosenberg in 1914
- György Lukács
- László Lukács elected in Aiud and Kremnica too, abdicated on Kremnica in 1910
- Gábor Madarassy elected on the place of László Márkus in 1912
- Baron Gyula Madarassy-Beck
- Károly Magyar
- Lajos Mán
- Gyula Manaszy
- Baron György Manaszy-Barco elected on the place of Ivan Stojanović in 1916
- Sámuel Mándy
- Vazul Mangra died in 1918
- Aladár Markhot
- József Márkus died in 1915
- László Márkus died in 1912
- Márton Mártonffy died in 1917
- Ödön Mayer
- Mihály Mayländer died in 1911
- László Melczer
- Vilmos Melzer
- Péter Mihályi
- Kanut Mikosevics abidcated in 1912
- Imre Miskolczy
- Sándor Mocsáry
- Béla Molnár
- Viktor Molnár
- Imre Montbach
- Zsigmond Morvai elected on the place of Zsigmond Várady in 1913
- Gyula Muslay
- Kálmán Münnich elected on the place of Károly Hieronymi in 1910
- Ferenc Nahgy
- József Nagy
- Sándor Nagy
- Lajos Návay
- György Nehrebeczky
- Károly Neiszidler
- Zsigmond Nemess
- Károly Németh
- Emil Neugeboren
- Mihály Niamessny
- Count Pál Niczky elected on the place of Count János Zichy in 1910
- Daniel Nikolić elected on the place of Sándor Plósz in 1914
- Baron Alfonz Nyáry died in 1916
- László Nyegre abdicated in 1913, than elected on the place of József Illés in 1917
- Károly Oberth
- Lajos Okolicsányi elected on the place of Gyula Keglevich in 1914
- Baron Fülöp Orosdy
- András Ossoinack elected on the place of Antal Vio in 1915
- Béla Paksy elected on the place of József Márkus in 1915
- Alfréd Pál
- Count József Pálffy elected on the place of Izsó Rósa in 1918
- Count Sándor Pálffy died in 1917
- Margrave György Pallavicini
- Géza Papp
- Zsigmond Péchy
- Gyula Pekár
- Dezső Perczel died in 1913
- Baron Zsigmond Perényi elected on the place of Gyula Kovács in 1913
- Miklós Pescha
- Károly Petráss elected on the place of Imre Haydin in 1912
- János Philipp
- János Pirkner
- Sándor Plósz abdicated in 1914
- Baron Endre Podmaniczky
- Count János Pongrácz
- Stevan V. Popović died in 1918
- Đorđe Radovanovic died in 1911
- Baron Antal Radvánszky
- Iván Rakovszky
- Gábor Rednik
- Gusztáv Reissenberger elected on the place of Imre Trauschenfels in 1912
- János Richter
- Gyula Rohonyi elected in Lučenec and Zrenjanin too, abdicated on Lučenec in 1911, then on Zrenjanin in 1912 too.
- Antal Rónay
- Ernő Rónay died in 1913
- Jenő Rónay
- Izsó Rósa elected on the place of Baron Ferenc Gerliczy in 1914, died in 1918
- Gyula Rosenberg died in 1914
- Ignác Rosenberg
- Baron Ervin Roszner elected on the place of Kálmán Széll in 1915
- Alajos Rudnay abdicated in 1912
- Béla Rudnay
- György Rudnyánszky abdicated in 1917
- György Sacelláry
- János Sándor
- Pál Shándor
- Ferenc Sárkány elected on the place of Imre Szivák in 1912, abdicated in 1917
- Karl Schmidt died in 1917
- Count Friedrich Karl Schönborn elected on the place of Gyula Várady in 1918
- Rezső Schuller abdicated in Agnita after elected on the place of Godofred Kuales at Bistrița in 1914
- Béla Scitovszky
- Count Béla Serényi elected in Banská Bystrica and Miskolc too, abdicated in Miskolc 1910 and Banská Bystrica in 1917, then elected on the place of Móric Putnoky at Putnok in 1917
- Iosif Siegescu
- Elemér Simon
- Elemér Simontsits elected on the place of Dezső Perczel in 1913
- Sándor Sipeky
- Mátyás Skrovina
- Baron Lajos Solymosy
- Baron Ödön Solymosy died in 1915
- Sándor Söpkéz
- Ivan Stojanović died in 1916
- János Szabó
- Károly Szász
- Pál Szász
- Count Emil Széchényi elected on the place of Gusztáv Kálmán in 1910, abdicated in 1917
- Aladár Székely elected on the place of Ferenc Székely in 1910
- Ferenc Székely elected in Târgu Mureș and Szombathely too, abdicated in Târgu Mureș in 1910
- György Székely died in 1913
- Gyula Szent-Iványi
- Miklós Szent-Iványi elected on the place of György Székely in 1913, died in 1914
- István Szentpáli elected on the place of László Görgey in 1911, abdicated in 1918
- Imre Szepesházy
- Lajos Szilágyi elected on the place of Kálmán Cziffra in 1916
- Zoltán Szilassy
- Márton Szilvássy elected on the place of Baron Ödön Solymosy in 1915, died in 1918
- Félix Szinyei-Merse
- Imre Szivák died in 1912
- Lajos Szlezák
- György Szmrecsányi abdicated in 1917
- Jenő Szmrecsányi elected on the place of Gyula Bujanovics in 1916
- Kálmán Szojka
- Imre Sztankovánszky
- Sándor Sztranyavszky elected on the place of Count Mark Wickenburg in 1916
- Ferenc Szuhányi
- Gusztáv Szulyovszky died in 1914
- Dezső Szupics
- Lipót Szutrély
- Géza Szüllő
- Nikola Tabaković elected on the place of Kristóf Tellecsky in 1914
- Sándor Tagányi
- József Takács
- Béla Tallián
- Béla Tauscher elected on the place of Károly Hieronymi in 1911
- József Telegdi died in 1916
- Count Ferenc Teleki
- Count József Teleki abdicated in 1917
- Count Sámuel Teleki died in 1916
- János Teleszky elected on the place of Gyula Rohonyi in 1912
- Kristóf Tellecsky died in 1914
- Vilmos Thuróczy abdicated in 1911
- Count István Tisza elected in Arad and Biharugra too, abdicated in Biharugra in 1910, died in 1918
- Count Kálmán Tisza
- Béla Török abdicated in 1917
- Emil Trauschenfels died in 1911
- Zoltán Ugron
- Lipót Vadász abdicated in Nyírbátor, then elected on the place of Sándor Lator at Sighetu Marmației in 1913
- Árpád Vagyon
- Miklós Vájna elected on the place of Miklós Szent-Iványi in 1914
- Gyula Várady died in 1917
- Zsigmond Várady died in 1913
- Gábor Varga
- Gyula Vargha elected on the place of Béla Blanár in 1914
- Zoltán Vermes
- Antal Vio elected on the place of Mihály Mayländer in 1911, abdicated in 1915
- Győző Vitéz elected on the place of László Salay in 1917
- István Vojnits elected on the place of József Zsubory in 1915, died in 1916
- Baron István Vojnits
- Sándor Vojnits
- Gyula Werner elected on the place of László Lukács in 1910
- Count Mark Wickenburg abdicated in 1912
- Prince Ludwig Windischgrätz elected on the place of Count Sándor Andrássy in 1916, abdicated in 1918
- Bertalan Winkler
- János Wittmann
- Count János Woracziczky
- József Zábráczky elected on the place of Ferenc Darvas in 1915
- Milán Zákó
- Gyula Zalán
- István Zathureczky
- Károly Zeyk
- Count Aladár Zichy, before 1910 was the member of the Catholic People's Party
- Count János Zichy elected in Eger, Großwarasdorf and Pécs too, abdicated at Großwarasdorf and Pécs in 1910, abdicated at Eger in 1918
- István Zsembery elected on the place of Count József Teleki in 1917
- Mihály Zsilinszky elected in Liptovský Mikuláš and Szarvas too, abdicated at Liptovský Mikuláš in 1910
- József Zsubory died in 1915

=== Independence Kossuth Party of '48 (1910–1913) ===
The members of the party after 1913 were the members of the United Party of Independence and '48

- Count Albert Apponyi
- József Bakó
- Béla Barabás elected on the place of Gábor Ugron in 1911
- János Baross
- Count Móric Benovszky
- Count Sándor Benyovszky died in 1913
- Béla Bernáth
- Count István Bethlen
- Ákos Bizony elected on the place of Ádám Lipcsey in 1911
- István Bottlik
- István Csemez
- Andor Csontos
- Zoltán Désy
- Aurél Förster
- Sándor Gál
- Aladár Gedeon
- László Hammersberg
- Lehel Héderváry
- Árpád Hegyi
- Lajos Hlatky-Schlichter
- Lajos Holló
- József Horvát
- Mihály Horváth
- Imre Ivánka
- Béla Jármy elected on the place of Géza Luby in 1911
- István Jármy
- Ubul Kállay
- Jenő Kapotsfy
- Béla Kelemen
- Ferenc Kossuth
- Kálmán Kovácsy
- Zoltán Lengel
- Mihály Lévay
- Béla Mezőssy
- Gyula Muzsa
- Gyula Nadányi
- Emil Nagy lost his mandate in 1911, because of insolvency
- József Narancsik elected on the place of Ferenc Jeszenszky in 1912
- László Okolicsányi
- Lajos Ostffy
- Gyula Paizs
- Móric Palugyay
- Zoltán Papp
- György Platthy elected on the place of Count Sándor Benyovszky in 1913
- Miklós Posgay
- Iván Reök
- Gyula Sághy
- Baron Miklós Sennyey
- Orbán Sipos elected on the place of Emil Nagy in 1911
- Count Tihamér Somssich
- István Szabó
- László Szalay
- Sándor Szalkai
- Antal Szebeny
- Árpád Szentiványi
- Pál Szluha
- János Tóth
- Kálmán Török
- Endre Vertán
- István Zlinszky

=== Justh Party of Independence and '48 (1910–1913) ===
The members of the party after 1913 were the members of the United Party of Independence and '48

- Samu Bakonyi
- Andor Barcsay
- Count Pál Batthyány
- Count Tivadar Batthyány
- János Behnedek
- Antal Bikádi
- Géza Bosnyák
- Ernő Csermák
- István Csuha
- Béla Egry elected on the place of Count János Zichy in 1910
- Zsigmond Eitner
- Count Mihály Esterházy
- Antal Faragó
- Károly Fernbach elected on the place of Kanut Mikosevics in 1912
- Béla Földes after 1913 was the member of the National Constitutional Party
- Loránt Fráter elected on the place of Ákos Molhnár in 1910
- Gyula Győrffy
- Géza Hartner
- János Hock
- Pál Jaczkó
- Ferenc Jeszenszky died in 1912
- Gyula Justh
- János Justh
- Tamás Kállay
- Samu Kelemen
- Kornél Kobek
- János Kovács
- Béla Kúun
- Márton Lovászy
- Géza Luby died in 1911
- Emil Maczky
- Lajos Madarassy-Beck
- József Madarász
- Baron Géza Manndorff
- László Meskó
- Ferenc Óvári
- Dezső Pattantyús-Ábrahám
- Elek Papp his mandate would be void in 1911
- Dezső Polónyi
- Elemér Preszly
- Viktor Rákosi
- Endre Ráth
- Vilmos Sümegi
- János Tüdős
- Ferenc Válentsik
- Etele Vertán
- István Veszprémy elected on the place of Elek Papp in 1910

=== Independent '67ers ===
- Count Géza Andrássy
- Count Gyula Andrássy
- Count Sándor Andrássy abdicated in 1916
- Baron Dezső Bánffy died in 1911
- Count Miklós Bánffy abdicated in 1917
- Ferenc Bárczay
- Count Lajos Batthyány abdicated in 1910
- Henrik Béla
- Baron Elemér Bornemisza
- Ignác Darányi
- Count Móric Esterházy after 1913 was the member of the National Constitutional Party
- Gyula Horváth
- Domokos Incze
- Ferenc Justh abdicated in 1911
- Ede Okolicsányi-Zsedényi
- Kálmán Széll died in 1915
- Aladár Szereday
- József Szterényi after 1918 he was the member of the Constitutional Party of '48
- Count László Wenckheim

=== Catholic People's Party ===
- Dezső Ajtics-Horváth
- János Bartos elected on the place of Gyula Keltz in 1912
- Antal Beszkid
- Kálmán Bresztyenszky elected on the place of Alajos Rudnay in 1912
- János Frey
- István Haller
- Károly Huszár
- Béla Landauer elected on the place of György Szmrecsányi in 1917
- János Monár
- Béla Rakovszky died in 1916
- István Rakhovszky
- Béla Seherr-Thoss
- Sándor Simonyi-Semadam
- Miklós Zboray
- János Zelenyák
- Count Aladár Zichy elected on the place of Count Lajos Batthyány in 1910, after 1917 was the member of the National Party of Work
- Count István Zichy

=== Independent '48ers ===
- Ödön Barta
- Ferenc Bolgár
- Vilmos Eckhardt elected on the place of Gyula Justh in 1917
- Count Jozef Károlyi abdicated in 1917
- Count Mihály Károlyi abdicated in 1914
- György Malatinszky
- Géza Polónyi
- Móric Putnoky abdicated in 1917
- Ferenc Thaly
- Ákos Ugron elected on the place of Baron Henrik Guttman in 1918
- Gábor Ughron died in 1911
- Nándor Urmánczy

=== Romanian National Party ===
- Vazul Damian
- Theodor Mihalyfi
- Ștefan Cicio Pop
- Nicola Șerban
- Alexandru Vaida-Voevod

=== National Independence Farmer Party for '48 ===
- László Fényes elected on the place of László Meskó in 1917
- Sándor Herczegh
- Gyula Kovács abdicated in 1913
- József Kristóffy elected on the place of András Áchim in 1911, abdicated in 1913
- János Mayer elected on the place of Count Mihály Károlyi in 1914
- János Novák
- István Szabó

=== Slovak National Party ===
- Pavel Blaho
- Ferdinand Juriga
- František Skyčák abdicated in 1914

=== Civic Democratic Party ===
- Sándor Pető
- Vilmos Vázsonyi

=== Hungarian Independent Socialist Peasant Party (1910–1911) ===
- András Áchim died in 1911

=== National Christian Socialist Party ===
- Sándor Giesswein

=== Independent moderate ===
- Aurél Bartal elected on the place of Count Sándor Pálffy in 1917
- Djoka Dundjerski elected on the place of Stevan V. Popović in 1918
- András Kállay elected on the place of József Horvátha in 1918
- Count László Semsey

=== United Party of Independence and '48 (1913–1918) ===
- Count Albert Apponyi
- József Bakó
- Samu Bakonyi
- Béla Barabás abdicated in 1917
- Andor Barcsay
- János Baross
- Count Pál Batthyány
- Count Tivadar Batthyány
- Jhános Benedek
- Count Móric Benovszky abdicated in 1917
- Béla Bernáth
- Zoltán Bernáth elected on the place of Péter Kende in 1917
- Count István Bethlen
- Antal Bikádi
- Ákos Bizony
- Géza Bosnyák abdicated in 1917
- István Bottlik
- István Csemez
- Ernő Csermák
- Endre Csizmazia elected on the place of Count Móric Benovszky in 1917
- Andor Csontos died in 1915
- István Csuha abdicated in 1917
- Zoltán Désy died in 1915
- Béla Egry
- Zsigmond Eitner
- Count Mihály Esterházy
- Árpád Falussy elected on the place of Count József Károlyi in 1917
- Antal Faragó
- Károly Fernbach
- Aurél Förster
- Loránt Fráter
- Sándor Gál after 1918 was the member of the Constitutional Party of '48
- Aladár Gedeon abdicated in 1917
- Pál Gyapay elected on the place of István Szabó in 1917
- Gyula Győrffy
- László Hammersberg abdicated in 1918
- Géza Hartner
- Lehel Héderváry
- János Hegedűs elected on the place of Antal Szebeny in 1915, after 1916 was the member of the Károlyi Party of Independence and '48
- Árpád Hegyi
- Lajos Hlatky-Schlichter
- János Hock
- Gyula Hódy elected on the place of Gyula Sághy in 1916
- Lajos Holló died in 1918
- József Horvátha died in 1917
- Mihály Horváth
- Guidó Hrabovszky elected on the place of Lipót Vadász in 1913, died in the same year
- Imre Ivánka
- Pál Jaczkó
- Béla Jármy
- István Jármy
- Gyula Justh died in 1917
- János Justh abdicated in 1917
- Tamás Kállay
- Ubul Kállay
- Jenő Kapotsfy
- Count Mihály Károlyi elected on the place of Ferenc Kossuth in 1914, after 1916 was the member of the Károlyi Party of Independence and '48
- Béla Kelemen abdicated in 1917
- Samu Kelemen died in 1916
- Tivadar Koller elected on the place of József Madarász in 1915
- Ferenc Kossuth died in 1914
- István Koszó elected on the place of Béla Kelemen in 1917
- Kornél Kobek abdicated in 1917
- Dénes Kovách elected on the place of Count Tihamér Somssich in 1917
- János Kovács died in 1918
- Kálmán Kovácsy
- Béla Kúun
- Hugó Laehne elected on the place of Count Guidó Hrabovszky in 1913
- Zoltán Lengel
- Mihály Lévay
- Ernő Létay elected on the place of Gyula Nadányi in 1916
- Márton Lovászy
- Emil Maczky abdicated in 1917
- Lajos Madarassy-Beck
- József Madarász died in 1915
- Baron Géza Manndorff
- Árpád Matta elected on the place of Andor Csontos in 1916
- László Meskó abdicated in 1917
- Zoltán Meskó elected on the place of Miklós Posgay in 1917
- Béla Mezőssy
- Gyula Muzsa
- Gyula Nadányi died in 1916
- József Narancsik
- László Okolicsányi
- Lajos Ostffy abdicated in 1917
- Ferenc Óvári
- Dezső Pattantyús-Ábrahám
- Gyula Paizs
- Móric Palugyay
- Zoltán Papp
- György Platthy
- Dezső Polónyi
- Mihály Porkoláb elected on the place of Lajos Ostffy in 1917
- Miklós Posgay died in 1917
- Elemér Preszly
- Viktor Rákosi
- Endre Ráth
- Iván Reök
- Gyula Sághy died in 1916
- Baron Miklós Sennyey
- Orbán Sipos
- Count Tihamér Somssich abdicated in 1917
- Ferenc Springer elected on the place of Ferenc Jakabffy in 1913
- László Stépán elected on the place of István Csuha in 1917
- Vilmos Sümegi
- István Szabó abdicated in 1917
- László Szalay abdicated in 1917
- Sándor Szalkai
- Antal Szebeny died in 1915
- Árpád Szentiványi died in 1918
- János Szigeti elected on the place of János Hegedűs in 1917
- Pál Szluha
- János Tóth
- Kálmán Török
- János Tüdős died in 1918
- Ferenc Válentsik
- Endre Vertán
- Etele Vertán
- István Veszprémy
- Sándor Vizlendvay elected on the place of Géza Bosnyák in 1917
- István Zlinszky

=== National Constitutional Party (1913–1918) ===
- Count Móric Esterházy before 1913 was an independent '67er, after 1918 was the member of the Constitutional Party of '48
- Béla Földes before 1913 was the member of Justh Party of Independence and '48
- Baron Henrik Guttman elected on the place of Gábor Dániel in 1917, his mandate would be void in 1918
- Baron Albert Kaas elected on the place of Géza Lónyay in 1917
- Count Pál Teleki elected on the place of Béla Rakovszky in 1916
- Gábor Ugron elected on the place of Zoltán Désy in 1915

=== Károlyi Party of Independence and '48 (1916–1918) ===
- Aladár Balla elected on the place of Ferenc Sárkány in 1917
- Dezső Dobóczky elected on the place of Emil Macky in 1917
- János Hegedűs before 1916 was the member of the United Party of Independence and '48, died in 1917
- Zoltán Jánosy elected on the place of János Tüdős in 1918
- Sándor Juhász Nagy elected on the place of János Justh in 1917
- Count Mihály Károlyi before 1916 was the member of the United Party of Independence and '48
- Pál Luczenbacher elected on the place of Kornél Kobek in 1917
- Vince Nagy elected on the place of Samu Kelemen in 1916
- Zsombor Szász elected on the place of Béla Barabás in 1917
- János Vass elected on the place of Count János Zichy in 1917

=== Independent Saxons (1917–1918) ===
- Hermann Albrich elected on the place of Gusztáv Gratz in 1917

=== Constitutional Party of '48 (1918) ===
- Count Móric Esterházy before 1918 was the member of the National Constitutional Party
- Sándor Gál before 1918 was the member of the United Party of Independence and '48
- Tibor Gözsy elected on the place of János Kovács in 1918
- Count János Hadik elected on the place of Aladár Gedeon in 1918
- Gyula Lakatos elected on the place of István Szentpáli in 1918
- Dénes Sebess elected on the place of Lajos Láng in 1918
- László Szalay elected on the place of László Hammersberg in 1918
- József Szterényi before 1918 was an independent '67er
- Kálmán Töpler elected on the place of Márton Szilvássy in 1918
- Sándor Wekerle elected on the place of Károly Khuen-Héderváry in 1918

== See also ==
- List of Hungarian people
