= List of members of the National Assembly of Hungary (1906–1910) =

National Assembly of Hungary (1906–1910) Országgyűlés

Type
- Type: bicameral
- Houses: House of Magnates, House of Representatives

History
- Founded: 21 May 1906
- Disbanded: 21 March 1910 (3 years, 304 days)
- Preceded by: Members 1905–1906
- New session started: Members 1910–1918

Structure
- Seats: 413
- Political groups: Government (362): Party of Independence and '48 (250); National Constitution Party (75); Catholic People's Party (34); Civic Democratic Party (3); Opposition (51): Independent moderate (22); Romanian National Party (14); Slovak National Party (7); Serb People's Radical Party (4); Independent '67ers (2); Reorganized Social Democratic Party of Hungary (1); Hungarian Independent Socialist Peasant Party (1)

Elections
- Last election: 26 January–4 February 1905
- Next election: 1–10 June 1910

Meeting place
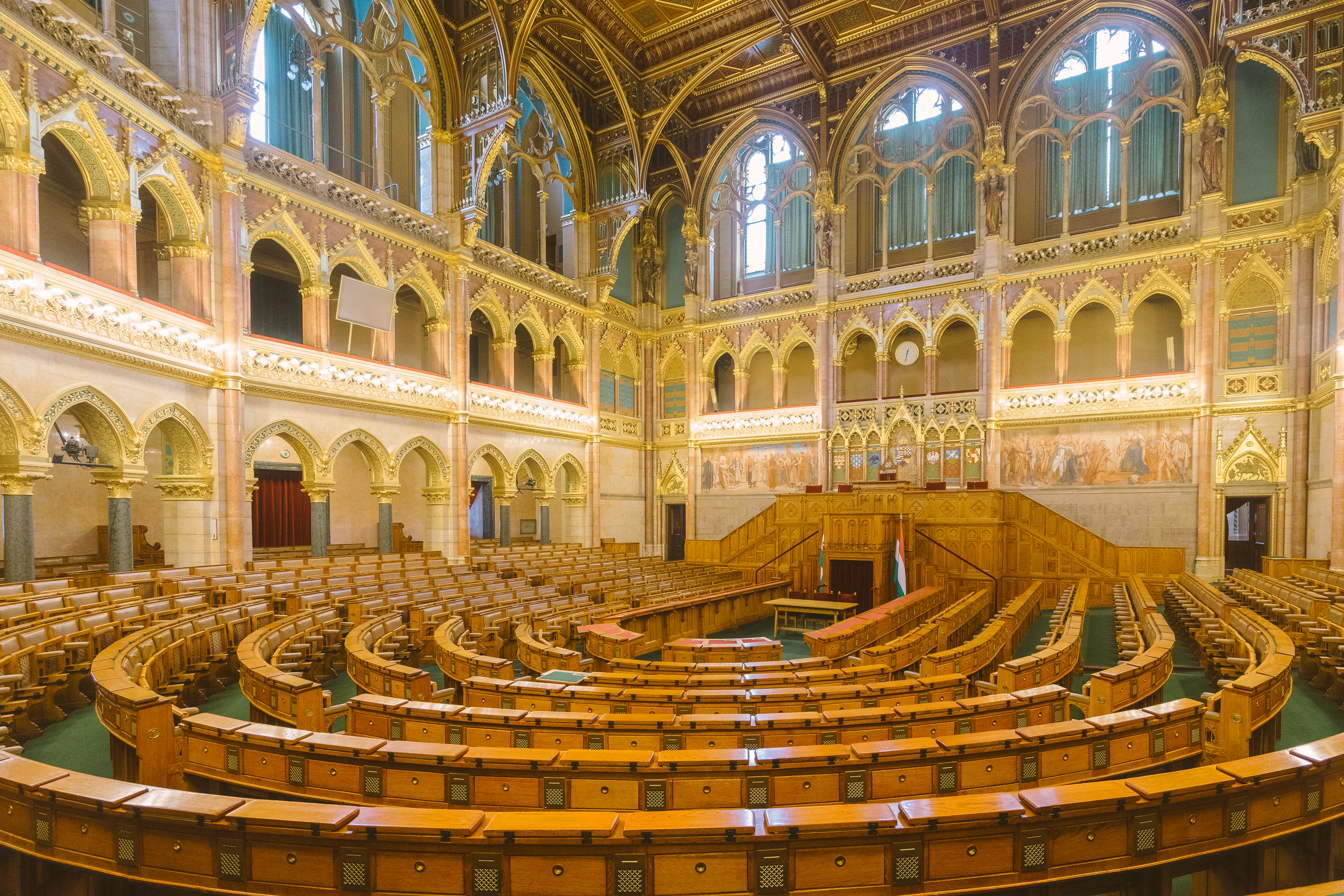
- Hungarian Parliament Building; Lajos Kossuth Square 1 Budapest, H-1055; Hungary

The list of members of the National Assembly of Hungary (1906–1910) is the list of members of the National Assembly - the bicameral legislative body of Hungary - according to the outcome of the Hungarian parliamentary election of 1906. The members of the new National Assembly were installed on May 21, 1906. There has been a sizable number of mutations since due to the particular nature of the Hungary constitutional system. New members are supplied from their party lists so the resignation of individual members' seats does not change the balance of power in the National Assembly.

== Officials ==
=== Speaker of the National Assembly ===
- Gyula Justh (26 May, 1906 – 12 November, 1909)
- Sándor Gál (13 November 1906 – 21 March, 1910)

=== Deputy Speakers of the National Assembly ===
- Lajos Návay (26 May, 1906 – 21 March, 1910)
- István Rakovszky (26 May, 1906 – 21 March, 1910)

=== Recorders ===
- János Benedek (26 May, 1906 – 21 March, 1910)
- Béla Egry (26 May, 1906 – 21 March, 1910)
- Ferenc Darányi (26 May, 1906 – 21 March, 1910)
- László Hammersberg (26 May, 1906 – 21 March, 1910)
- Miklós Thorotzkai (26 May, 1906 – 21 March, 1910)
- Károly Várady (26 May, 1906 – 21 March, 1910)

=== First Officer ===
- János Tóth (26 May, 1906 – 21 March, 1910)

=== Father of the House ===
- István Szappanos (21 May, 1906 – 26 May, 1906)

== Composition ==
Affiliation	Members	
Affiliation	21 May 1906	21 March 1910
Party of Independence and '48	250	247
National Constitution Party	75	0
Catholic People's Party	34	34
Independent moderate	22	21
Romanian National Party	14	13
Slovak National Party	7	6
Serb People's Radical Party	4	4
Civic Democratic Party	3	4
Independent '67ers	2	2
Reorganized Social Democratic Party of Hungary	1	1
Hungarian Independent Socialist Peasant Party	1	0
National Party of Work	0	77
National Independence Farmer Party for '48	0	1
Saxon People's Party	0	1
Total number of seats	413	411

- Two seats remained vacant because there was not enough time for a by-election

== Members of the National Assembly ==
=== Party of Independence and '48 ===
- Count Albert Apponyi
- Mihály Babó
- Sándor Babocsay
- József Bakó
- Samu Bakonyi
- Aladár Ballagi
- Mihály Balogh
- Ernő Baloghy
- Béla Barabás elected in Arad, 7th District of Budapest, Nagykőrös, Oradea, abdicated at all in 1906 expect Nagykőrös
- Andor Barcsay
- Sándor Bárczay elected on the place of László Szalay in 1907
- János Baross
- Ferenc Bartal
- György Bartal elected on the place of Sándor Popovics in 1909
- Ferenc Bartha abdicated in 1907
- Ödön Bartha
- Gusztáv Bartsch elected on the place of Antal Günther in 1909, abdicated in 1910
- Count József Batthyány
- Count Tivadar Batthyány elected in Pécs and Zurndorf, abdicated at Pécs in 1906
- Count Zsigmond Batthyány
- Károly Becsey
- János Bedőházy
- István Bene
- János Benedek
- Árpád Beniczky elected on the place of Albert Molnár in 1907
- Elemér Beniczky
- Count Rezső Benyovszky
- Count Sándor Benyovszky
- Béla Bernáth
- Zoltán Bernáth
- Jenő Berzsenyi
- Imre Betegh died in 1908
- Count Ádám Bethlen
- Count István Bethlen
- Ákos Bizony
- Károly Bohus
- István Bottlik
- János Bottlik died in 1909
- János Botzenhardt elected on the place of Antal Keszits in 1908
- Árpád Bozóky
- Zoltán Brázay
- Aladár Burgyán
- Barna Buza
- Gyula Chernel abdicated in 1908
- János Csanak elected on the place of Kálmán Szabó in 1909
- Sándor Csányi
- István Csemez elected on the place of Lajos Pogány in 1909
- Géza Csépány
- Endre Csizmazia
- Andor Csontos
- Géza Csóthi
- Zoltán Désy elected on the place of Albert Filep in 1907, abdicated in 1908
- Péter Dobroszláv
- László Draskóczy
- Ödön Duchon elected on the place of Lajos Olay in 1908
- Endre Dudits
- Antal Éber
- Béla Egry
- Zsigmond Eitner
- Árpád Embery elected on the place of József Simkó in 1909
- Gyula Endrey
- Károly Fábry
- Antal Faragó
- Albert Farkas elected on the place of Zoltán Désy in 1908
- Zsigmond Farkasházy
- László Fekete elected on the place of Ádám Majthényi in 1909
- Soma Fenyvesi elected on the place of Dénes Sebess in 1906
- Béla Ferdinándy
- Géza Ferenczy
- József Fernbach
- Péter Fernbach
- Albert Filep died in 1907
- Lajos Filipich elected on the place of Kálmán Ziegler in 1906
- Zsigmond Fogarassy
- Béla Földes
- Lajos Fried
- Gaszton Gaál
- András Gál
- Gyula Gál
- Sándor Gál
- János Gáspár
- János Geréb
- Sándor Gotthard
- Ferenc Gubody abdicated in 1906
- Antal Günther abdicated in 1909
- Dezső Gyarmathy
- Gerő Gyelmis elected on the place of Károly Varga in 1908
- Domokos Györgypál abdicated in 1908
- Pál Hainrikffy elected on the place of János Szluha in 1907
- Frigyes Hajdu
- Ignác Hajnód elected on the place of Domokos Györgypál in 1908
- Lajos Halász
- László Hammersberg
- Dániel Haviár
- József Hebrony
- Lehel Héderváry
- Géza Hellebronth
- Lajos Hentaller
- Ferenc Hermán
- Károly Hilbert died in 1908
- Ernő Hinléder-Fels
- Lajos Hirtenstein
- Lajos Hlatky-Schlichter elected on the place of Károly Hilbert in 1908
- János Hock
- Gyula Hódy
- Ottó Hoffmann
- Pál Hoitsy
- Lajos Holló
- József Horovitz
- Béla Horthy
- Gyula Horváth
- József Horváth
- Guidó Hrabovszky
- Bálint Illyés
- Baron József Inkey
- István Ipolyi-Keller
- József Irsay
- Imre Ivánka elected on the place of Ferenc Udvary in 1907
- Marcel Jankovich
- Ferenc Jeszenszky
- György Justh
- Gyula Justh
- János Justh
- Géza Kacskovics
- Lipót Kállay
- Tamás Kállay
- Ubul Kállay abdicated in 1906
- József Kálosi
- Samu Kardos
- Count István Károlyi died in 1907
- Ferenc Kecskeméthy
- István Kecskeméthy elected on the place of Mór Pisztóry in 1906
- Béla Kelemen abdicated in 1906
- Samu Kelemen
- György Kerese
- Antal Keszits died in 1907
- Kálmán Kiszely abdicated in 1906
- Károly Kmety
- Tivadar Koller
- Andor Korda
- Ferenc Kossuth
- Ernő Kovács
- János Kovács elected on the place of István Szluha in 1908
- Albert Kovácsy abdicated in 1908
- Mihály Kökényesdy
- Ferenc Krasznay died in 1907
- Béla Kubik abdicated in 1906
- Gyula Kubik elected on the place of Béla Kubik in 1906
- Márton Kubinyi
- István Kuszka
- Árpád Kúun
- Hugó Laehne
- Mór Lányi
- Pál Lázár
- Zoárd Lázár
- Zoltán Lengyel
- Gyula Leszkay
- Mihály Lévay
- Sándor Lipthay
- Andor Lovászy
- Márton Lovászy
- Béla Luby
- Géza Luby
- Gyula Lukáts died in 1906
- Emil Maczky elected on the place of János Samassa in 1908
- Lajos Madarassy-Beck elected on the place of Gyula Lukáts in 1906
- József Madarász
- József Madarász
- György Mahler
- Ádám Majthényi died in 1909
- György Malatinszky
- Baron Géza Manndorff elected on the place of Gyula Saára in 1908
- Mihály Máriássy
- Péter Marjay
- Gyula Markos
- Béla Meczner abdicated in 1908
- Géza Melczer
- Lajos Mérey
- László Meskó
- Béla Mezőssy
- Imre Miksa
- Albert Molnár abdicated in 1907
- Ákos Molnár
- Jenő Molnár
- Simon Mukits
- Gyula Muzsa elected on the place of Ferenc Krasznay in 1907
- Károly Müller elected on the place of Béla Barabás in 1906
- Károly Nadányi elected on the place of Lajos Rigó in 1908
- Barna Nagy elected on the place of Count Gyula Andrássy in 1906
- Dezső Nagy
- Emil Nagy
- György Nagy
- Sándor Nagy
- Bertalan Nemes
- Imre Németh
- Dániel Novák
- László Okolicsányi
- Lajos Olay abdicated in 1908
- Ferenc Óvári elected on the place of Ubul Kállay in 1906
- Dezső P. Ábrahám
- Béla Papp elected on the place of Count István Károlyi in 1907
- Elek Papp
- Zoltán Papp
- László Pataky
- Oszkár Petrogalli
- István Pilissy
- Mór Pisztóry died in 1906
- Ferenc Pleininger elected on the place of Count Tivadar Batthyány in 1906
- Lajos Pogány died in 1909
- Dezső Polónyi
- Géza Polónyi elected in the 4th Discrict of Budapest and Uzhhorod, abdicated at Uzhhorod in 1906
- Miklós Posgay
- Elemér Preszly elected on the place of János Bottlik in 1909
- Móric Putnoky
- Aladár Rajk
- Viktor Rákosi
- Endre Ráth
- László Rátkay
- Iván Reök elected on the place of Béla Kelemen in 1906
- Lajos Rigó died in 1908
- Gyula Saára elected on the place of Count Jenő Zichy in 1907, abdicated in 1908
- Manó Ság
- Gyula Sághy
- János Samassa abdicated in 1908
- József Schriffert
- Dénes Sebess abdicated in 1906
- Baron Miklós Sennyey elected on the place of Bla Meczner in 1908
- József Simkó abdicated in 1909
- Endre Solymossy elected on the place of Albert Kovácsy in 1908, died in 1909
- Aladár Somogyi
- Count Tihamér Somssich
- Franz Steiner
- Vilmos Sümegi
- István Szabó
- Kálmán Szabó died in 1909
- Károly Szabó
- László Szalay abdicated in 1906
- István Szappanos
- József Szász
- Zsombor Szász
- Mór Szatmári
- Antal Szebeny
- Nándor Szederkényi abdicated in 1906
- Huba Szemere
- Árpád Szent-Iványi
- Gábor Szent-Iványi
- Zoltán Szentkirályi elected on the place of Baron Elemér Bornemisza in 1906
- Ottó Sziklay
- István Szluha died in 1908
- János Szluha died in 1907
- Tamás Szokoly elected on the place of Béla Barabás in 1906
- Mihály Szúnyog
- Alajos Telbisz elected on the place of Count Sándor Nákó in 1906
- Count Arvéd Teleki
- Ferenc Thaly
- Kálmán Thaly died in 1909
- László Thaly
- Viktor Thoroczkay
- Lajos Tolnay
- János Tóth
- Ferenc Török
- Kálmán Török
- János Tüdős elected on the place of Kálmán Thaly in 1909
- Sándor Tutsek
- Gábor Ugron
- Iván Ujházy
- Imre Uray died in 1908
- Miklós Uray
- Nándor Urmánczy
- Ferenc Válentsik elected on the place of Endre Solymossy in 1909
- Imre Várady
- Károly Várady
- Károly Varga died in 1908
- Imre Várnay
- Dezső Vásárhelyi
- József Veres
- Endre Vertán
- Gyula Világhy
- Soma Visontai elected on the place of Géza Polónyi in 1906
- Ferenc Vizy
- János Weber
- Miklós Weresmarthy
- Baron Miklós Wesselényi abdicated in 1906
- Baron Ferenc Wesselényi elected on the place of Baron Miklós Wesselényi in 1907
- János Zakariás
- Count Jenő Zichy died in 1906
- Count Miklós Zichy
- Count Vladimir Zichy
- Kálmán Ziegler abdicated in 1906
- István Zlinszky

=== National Constitution Party (1906-1910) ===
- Aladár Ajtay
- Count Géza Andrássy
- Count Gyula Andrássy elected in Olaszliszka, Trebišov and Košice too, abdicated in Olaszliszka and Trebišov
- Count Sándor Andrássy
- Lajos Badinyi elected on the place of Ödön Battik in 1906
- Tamás Barcsay elected on the place of Imre Betegh in 1908
- Count Lajos Batthyány
- Jusztin Baross abdicated in 1908
- Ödön Battik abdicated in 1906
- Henrik Béla elected on the place of Jusztin Baross in 1908
- István Bernáth
- Ferenc Bolgár
- Barna Buday
- Szilárd Burdia
- Bertalan Czibur
- László Czobor
- Pál Dániel elected on the place of Kálmán Kiszely in 1906
- Baron Tibor Dániel elected on the place of Gergely Kabdebó in 1906
- Ignác Darányi
- Count Aurél Dessewffy abdicated in 1906
- Count Emil Dessewffy elected on the place of Count Aurél Dessewffy in 1906
- Viktor Adolf Eitel elected on the place of Franz Pildner in 1907
- József Emődy
- Count Gyula Erdődy
- János Ertl
- Count Béla Esterházy
- Count Móric Esterházy elected on the place of Count Gyula Andrássy in 1906
- Kálmán Fodor
- István Győrössy-Csepreghy
- Count János Hadik
- Count Sándor Hadik
- Antal Heinrich
- Viktor Issekutz
- Lajos Jekelfalussy
- Baron Károly Jungenfeld
- Gergely Kabdebó abdicated in 1906
- Count Jenő Karátsonyi
- László László
- Gyula Markbreit
- Aladár Markhot
- László Máthé elected on the place of Imre Uray in 1908
- Endre Mihajlovics
- Péter Mihályi
- Iván Moskovitz abdicated in 1910
- Ferenc Nagy
- Count Sándor Nákó abdicated in 1906
- Lajos Návay
- György Nehrebeczky abdicated in 1908
- Ede Okolicsányi-Zsedényi
- Margrave György Pallavicini
- Zsigmond Péchy
- Miklós Pescha
- Baron Arthur Petrichevich-Horváth
- János Philipp
- Sándor Popovics abdicated in 1909
- Dezső Potoczky
- Aladár Raisz
- Baron Simon Révay
- Lőrinc Rohonczy elected on the place of György Nehrebeczky in 1908
- György Rudnyánszky
- Sándor Rudnyánszky
- László Semsey
- Iosif Siegescu elected on the place of Coriolan Brediceanu in 1909
- Iván Stojanovits
- Miklós Szemere
- Aladár Szereday
- Zoltán Szilassy
- Félix Szinyei Merse
- Imre Szivák
- Andor Szontagh
- Count Sándor Sztáray
- József Szterényi
- Count Géza Teleki
- Count Pál Teleki
- József Teszelszky
- Count Miklós Thoroczkay
- Leó Uhlig
- Count Emil Üchtritz-Amade
- Baron László Vécsey
- Gyula Weisz elected on the place of Coriolan Brediceanu in 1907
- Sándor Wekerle
- Sándor Tivadar Wekerle
- Richárd Zanella
- Counn Béla Zichy
- Count János Zichy abdicated in 1910

=== Catholic People's Party ===
- István Adamovich
- Dezső Ajtics-Horváth
- Mihály Artim
- Ödön Beniczky
- Kálmán Bresztyenszky
- István Buzáth
- János Csernoch
- Béla Csitáry
- Ferenc Csizmazia
- Ferenc Darányi
- Milán Dobrovics
- Sándor Ernszt
- József Farkas
- Ottó Förster
- Sándor Giesswein
- Emil Gyuriss
- Count László Hunyady
- Károly Huszár
- Gyula Jánoky-Madocsány
- Sándor Karácsonyi
- Pál Kovács
- Count István Mailáth
- László Mednyánszky
- János Molnár
- Béla Nyáry
- Ágoston Ochaba elected on the place of Milan Ivanka in 1909
- Béla Rakovszky
- István Rakovszky
- Sándor Simonyi-Semadam
- György Szmrecsányi
- István Tálos
- Ferenc Udvary abdicated in 1907
- Carl Wildfeuer
- Miklós Zboray
- Count Aladár Zichy

=== Independent moderate ===
- Wilhelm Bruckner
- Ioan Ciocan
- Traugott Copony
- László Dániel
- Károly Eötvös elected on the place of Béla Barabás in 1906
- Gusztáv Gratz
- Wilhelm Gresskowitz
- Oszkár Ivánka
- Gottfried Kuales
- Mihály László
- Gustav Lindner died in 1909
- Wilhelm Melzer
- Kálmán Mikszáth
- Vasile Negrea
- Karl Oberth
- Franz Pildner died in 1907
- Pál Sándor
- Nicolae Șerban
- Karl Schmidt
- Rudolf Schuller
- Kálmán Széll
- Béla Tallián
- Emil Trauschenfels

=== Romanian National Party ===
- Coriolan Brediceanu elected in Oravița and Lugoj, but his mandate in Lugoj would be void in 1906, he died in 1909
- Basiliu Damian
- Vasile Goldiş
- Iuliu Maniu
- Teodor Mihali
- Aurel Novac
- Nicolae Oncu
- Ştefan Petrovici
- Ştefan Cicio Pop
- George Popovici
- Ioan Suciu
- Alexandru Vaida-Voevod
- Aurel Vlad
- Vasile Lucaciu elected on the place of Ferenc Bartha in 1907

=== Slovak National Party ===
- Metod Matei Bella
- Pavel Blaho
- Milan Hodža
- Milan Ivanka elected on the place of František Jehlička in 1907, but his mandate would be void in 1909
- František Jehlička abdicated in 1907
- Ferdiš Juriga
- Martin Kollár
- František Skičak

=== Serb People's Radical Party ===
- Jovan Manojlović
- Jaša Mrksić
- Demeter Mušicki
- Mihail Polit-Desančić

=== Civic Democratic Party ===
- Ernő Bródy
- Adolf Leitner
- Sándor Pető elected on the place of András Áchim in 1906
- Vilmos Vázsonyi

=== Independent '67ers ===
- Baron Dezső Bánffy
- Vilmos Koppony

=== Reorganized Social Democratic Party of Hungary ===
- Vilmos Mezőfi

=== Hungarian Independent Socialist Peasant Party (1906) ===
- András Áchim his mandate would be void in 1906

=== National Party of Work (1910) ===
The members of the party before 1910 were the members of the National Constitution Party

- Aladár Ajtay
- Count Géza Andrássy
- Count Gyula Andrássy
- Count Sándor Andrássy
- Lajos Badinyi
- Tamás Barcsay
- Count Lajos Batthyány
- Henrik Béla
- István Bernáth
- Ferenc Bolgár
- Barna Buday
- Szilárd Burdia
- Bertalan Czibur
- László Czobor
- Pál Dániel
- Baron Tibor Dániel
- Ignác Darányi
- Count Emil Dessewffy
- Viktor Adolf Eitel
- József Emődy
- Count Gyula Erdődy
- János Ertl
- Count Béla Esterházy
- Count Móric Esterházy
- Kálmán Fodor
- István Győrössy-Csepreghy
- Count János Hadik
- Count Sándor Hadik
- Antal Heinrich
- Károly Hieronymi elected on the place of Gusztáv Bartsch in 1910
- Viktor Issekutz
- Lajos Jekelfalussy
- Baron Károly Jungenfeld
- Count Jenő Karátsonyi
- László László
- Gyula Markbreit
- Aladár Markhot
- László Máthé
- Endre Mihajlovics
- Péter Mihályi
- Iván Moskovitz abdicated in 1910
- Ferenc Nagy
- Lajos Návay
- Ede Okolicsányi-Zsedényi
- Margrave György Pallavicini
- Zsigmond Péchy
- Miklós Pescha
- Baron Arthur Petrichevich-Horváth
- János Philipp
- Dezső Potoczky
- Aladár Raisz
- Baron Simon Révay
- Lőrinc Rohonczy
- György Rudnyánszky
- Sándor Rudnyánszky
- László Semsey
- Iosif Siegescu
- Iván Stojanovits
- Miklós Szemere
- Aladár Szereday
- Zoltán Szilassy
- Félix Szinyei Merse
- Imre Szivák
- Andor Szontagh
- Count Sándor Sztáray
- József Szterényi
- Count Géza Teleki
- Count Pál Teleki
- József Teszelszky
- Count Miklós Thoroczkay
- Leó Uhlig
- Count Emil Üchtritz-Amade
- Baron László Vécsey
- Gyula Weisz
- Sándor Wekerle
- Sándor Tivadar Wekerle
- Richárd Zanella
- Counn Béla Zichy
- Count János Zichy abdicated in 1910

=== National Independence Farmer Party for '48 (1908–1910) ===
- István Szabó elected on the place of Gyula Chernel in 1908

=== Saxon People's Party (1909–1910) ===
- Georg Gündisch elected on the place of Gustav Lindner in 1909

== See also ==
- List of Hungarian people
