= Lajos Návay =

Hungarian jurist and politician

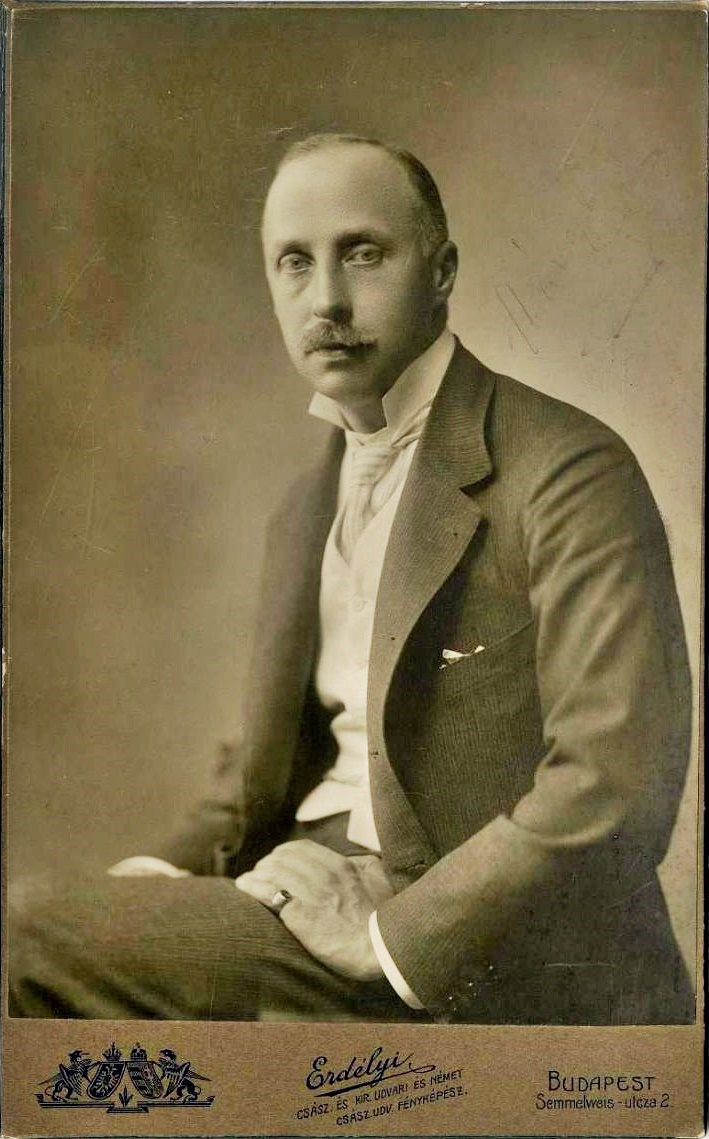

Speaker of the House of Representatives
- In office 9 November 1911 – 21 May 1912
- Preceded by: Albert Berzeviczy
- Succeeded by: István Tisza

Personal details
- Born: 18 September 1870 Földeák, Austria-Hungary
- Died: 29 April 1919 (aged 48) Kiskunfélegyháza, Hungarian Soviet Republic
- Political party: Liberal Party (?-1904); Constitution Party (1904/05-1910); Party of National Work (1910-1912); Independent (1912-1919)
- Profession: jurist, politician

Lajos Návay de Földeák (18 September 1870 – 29 April 1919) was a Hungarian jurist and politician, who served as Speaker of the House of Representatives between 1911 and 1912.

== Biography ==
He was born in Földeák, Csanád County into a Catholic family. The Návay family held important functions since expulsion of the Ottoman Empire (late-17th century). His parents were Lajos Návay Sr. and Ilona Eötvös, daughter of Baron József Eötvös. His paternal grandfather was Tamás Návay, Lord Lieutenant (Count; comes) of Csanád County, parliamentary emissary and member of the House of Magnates.

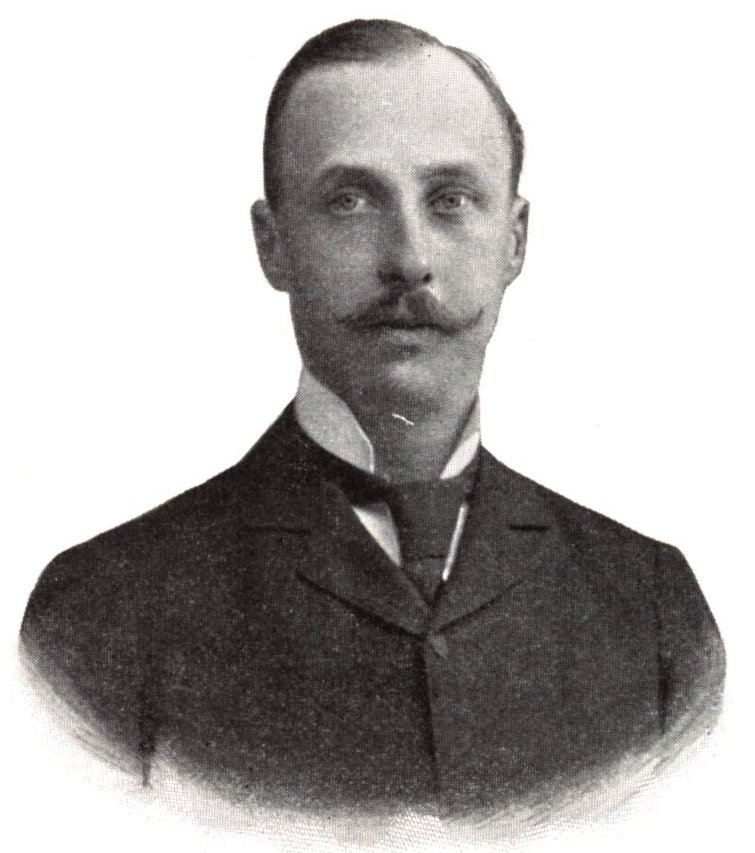
Lajos Návay

He finished his secondary studies in Szeged and Budapest. After that he studied law in the capital city then listened to half a year in the Universities of Berlin and Bonn. He was honored to Ph.D. in 1891. He was appointed honorary deputy notary of Csanád County in May 1892; since October 1895 served as Honorary Chief Constable; since December 1896 as Chief Notary; since December 1901 as Deputy Lieutenant (Viscount; vicecomes).

Návay joined the national political scene in 1904. For a short time he was a member of the Liberal Party, he withdrew from the party after the scandalous "handkerchief vote" on 18 November 1904. He joined to the group of "dissidents" led by Gyula Andrássy the Younger which later transformed into National Constitution Party. He served as Member of Parliament between 1905 and 1918. He was appointed as one of the deputy speakers of the lower house in 1906. He performed at hard against the Croatian obstruction. His party merged into the Party of National Work in 1910.

He replaced Albert Berzeviczy in the position of Speaker of the House of Representatives in 1911. Prime Minister László Lukács submitted the new electoral draft on 31 December 1912. Návay's opinion about the draft obtained from those of fellow party members, as a result he left the party and became a non-partisan parliamentarian. After outbreak of the First World War he was appointed Ministerial Commissioner for Food.

Prime Minister Sándor Wekerle resigned on 30 October 1918 and King Charles IV designated Count János Hadik to the position. Návay would have been the Minister of the Interior if the cabinet could have formed but the Aster Revolution swept away the old system and Count Mihály Károlyi became new premier of the country.

=== Death ===
During the Hungarian Soviet Republic the Communists, who were fleeing from the Serb and French invasions, took hostages from Makó on 26 April 1919. Simultaneously Tibor Szamuely, leading figure of the Red Terror arrived to Makó to take revenge for the murder of People's Commissar Kálmán Vásárhelyi on 23 April 1919. The Directore in Földeák abducted Návay too. He was murdered in the railway station in Kiskunfélegyháza along with his cousin, Iván Návay and Chief Notary for Szentes, Béla Kiss.

== Memories ==
There was a monument in Makó which portrayed Lajos Návay since 1935. At present, only the side figures remained. On 31 October 2011 Speaker of the National Assembly of Hungary László Kövér unveiled a memorial plaque of former speakers István Tisza and Lajos Návay in the Hungarian Parliament Building.

Political offices
Preceded by Albert Berzeviczy	Speaker of the House of Representatives; 1911–1912	Succeeded by István Tisza
