= Lajos Jekelfalussy =

Hungarian military officer and politician

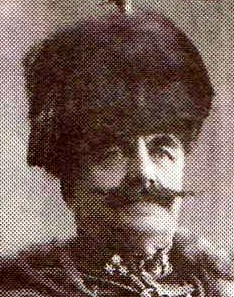
- Born: 1 October 1848; Szacsur, Kingdom of Hungary
- Died: 1911 (aged 62–63); Budapest, Austria-Hungary
- Military career
- Allegiance: Austria-Hungary
- Service years: 1869–1910
- Rank: Major General
- Commands: Thirty-seventh Home Defence Battalion, Twelfth Home Defence Infantry Regiment, Eightieth Pawn Brigade
- Awards: Order of the Iron Crown; Order of Leopold

Lajos Jekelfalussy (1 October 1848 – 22 July 1911) was a Hungarian military officer and politician, who served as Minister of Defence between 1906 and 1910. His grandfather was József Jekelfalussy, royal chamberlain.

Political offices
Preceded by Sándor Wekerle	Minister of Defence; 1906–1910	Succeeded by Samu Hazai
