= Mihály Esterházy =

Count Mihály Esterházy of Galánta
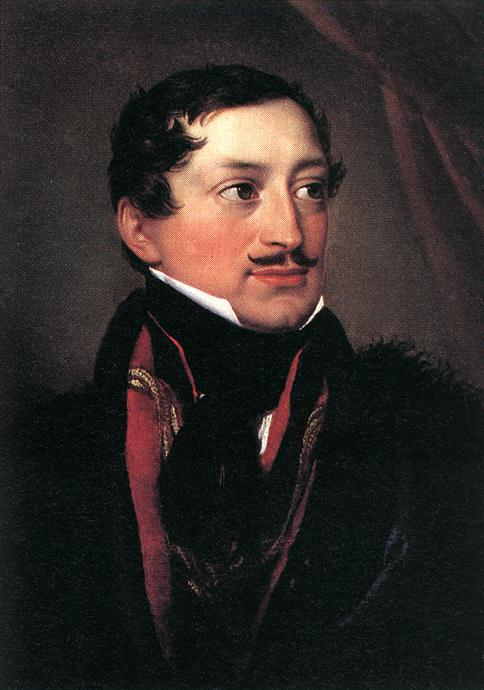

Member of the House of Magnates
- In office 1825–1827
- In office 1847–1848
- In office 1848–1849
- In office 1861–1861
- In office 1865 – 4 December 1874

Ambassador of the Austrian Empire to the Grand Duchy of Tuscany
- In office 1810s–1810s

Personal details
- Born: 9 February 1783 Nagyszeben, Grand Principality of Transylvania, Habsburg Monarchy (present-day Sibiu, Romania)
- Died: 4 December 1874 (aged 91) Pozsony, Kingdom of Hungary, Austria-Hungary (present-day Bratislava, Slovakia)
- Party: Conservative

Count Mihály Esterházy of Galánta (in Hungarian: Gróf galántai Esterházy Mihály, 9 February 1783 – 4 December 1874) was a Hungarian nobleman and politician, member of the National Defence Committee (Országos Honvédelmi Bizottmány, or OHB) during the 1848 Revolution, as well as a patron of the arts. He was a leading figure of the Hungarian Reform Era.

== Biography ==
Born in Nagyszeben (present-day Sibiu, Romania), his godfather was József Károly Eder. Like several of his siblings, he completed his studies in Kolozsvár. He began his career as an assistant clerk (under-sheriff) for Kolozs County. Later, he served as an intern at the royal court of appeals in Marosvásárhely and at the gubernium in Kolozsvár.

In 1803, he became a draftsman at the Transylvanian Court Chancellery, and in 1804 he was granted the title of chamberlain.

In 1806, he was appointed chamberlain-in-waiting to Archduke Rainer Joseph of Austria, later becoming his secretary. For his service, he was awarded the Small Cross of the Order of Leopold in 1817 and became a secretary at the United Court Chancellery, later serving as envoy to Florence, the then-capital of the Grand Duchy of Tuscany.

In 1820, he was appointed magistrate of Békés County. From 1825, he spoke in the Diet of Hungary. He belonged to the circle of István Széchenyi and continuously worked toward the development of Hungary. In 1830, he was recommended as Hungarian court chancellor and parliamentary envoy. He resigned from his positions on 29 October 1836.

During the Hungarian Revolution of 1848, he was elected a member of the National Defence Committee. In 1852, he was sentenced to six years of fortress imprisonment, serving his sentence in Komárom. He was released by royal pardon in 1855.

He was rehabilitated in 1860, and in 1861 he became the dean of the house of the House of Magnates (the upper house of parliament).

He passionately cultivated music and geology. He was a patron of Beethoven and supported the young Franz Liszt.

== Family ==
He was a member of the older Csesznek branch of the Esterházy family. His father was Count János Nepomuk Esterházy (1754–1840), Lord Lieutenant of Veszprém County, and his mother was Countess Ágnes Bánffy (1756–1831), who had twelve children. His siblings included Ferenc (1778–1855), Alajos (1780–1868), György (1781–1865), and Dénes (1789–1862).

On 19 April 1817, he married Antonia Schröfl von Mannsberg (1795–1880). They had seven children: Ágnes (1818), Szerafin (1820–1878), István (1822–1899), who served as a member of parliament, Antal (1825), Ferenc (1828–1861), Franciska (1831–1925), and Sarolta (1834–1890).
