= Károly Németh =

Károly Németh can refer to:

- Károly Németh (judoka) (born 1957), Hungarian judoka
- Károly Németh (politician) (1922–2008), Hungarian politician
- Károly Németh (table tennis) (born 1970), Hungarian table tennis player
