= Gábor Ugron =

Hungarian politician (1880–1960)

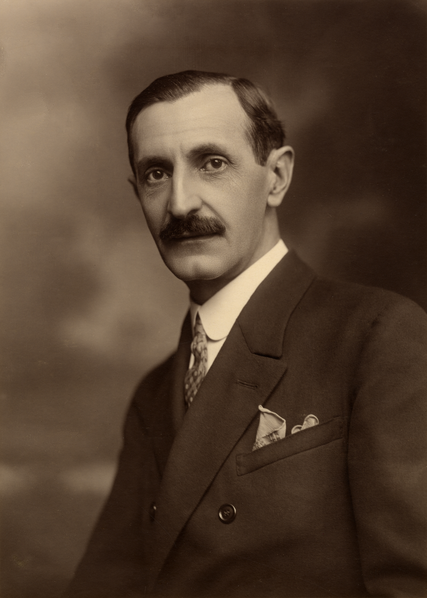

Minister of the Interior of Hungary
- In office 15 June 1917 – 25 January 1918
- Preceded by: László Lukács
- Succeeded by: Gábor Ugron

Personal details
- Born: January 8, 1880 Marosvásárhely, Austria-Hungary
- Died: 27 October 1960 (aged 80) Bakonybél, Hungary
- Party: Constitution Party
- Profession: politician

Gábor Ugron de Ábránfalva the Younger (8 January 1880 – 27 October 1960) was a Hungarian politician, a member of one of the oldest noble families of Transylvania, who served as Interior Minister between 1917 and 1918. After the First World War he organized the Szekler National Council. His father was the parliamentary representative Gábor Ugron the Elder (1847-1911).

Political offices
Preceded by János Sándor	Minister of the Interior; 1917–1918	Succeeded by János Tóth
