= József Haller =

Hungarian painter, illustrator and scenic designer

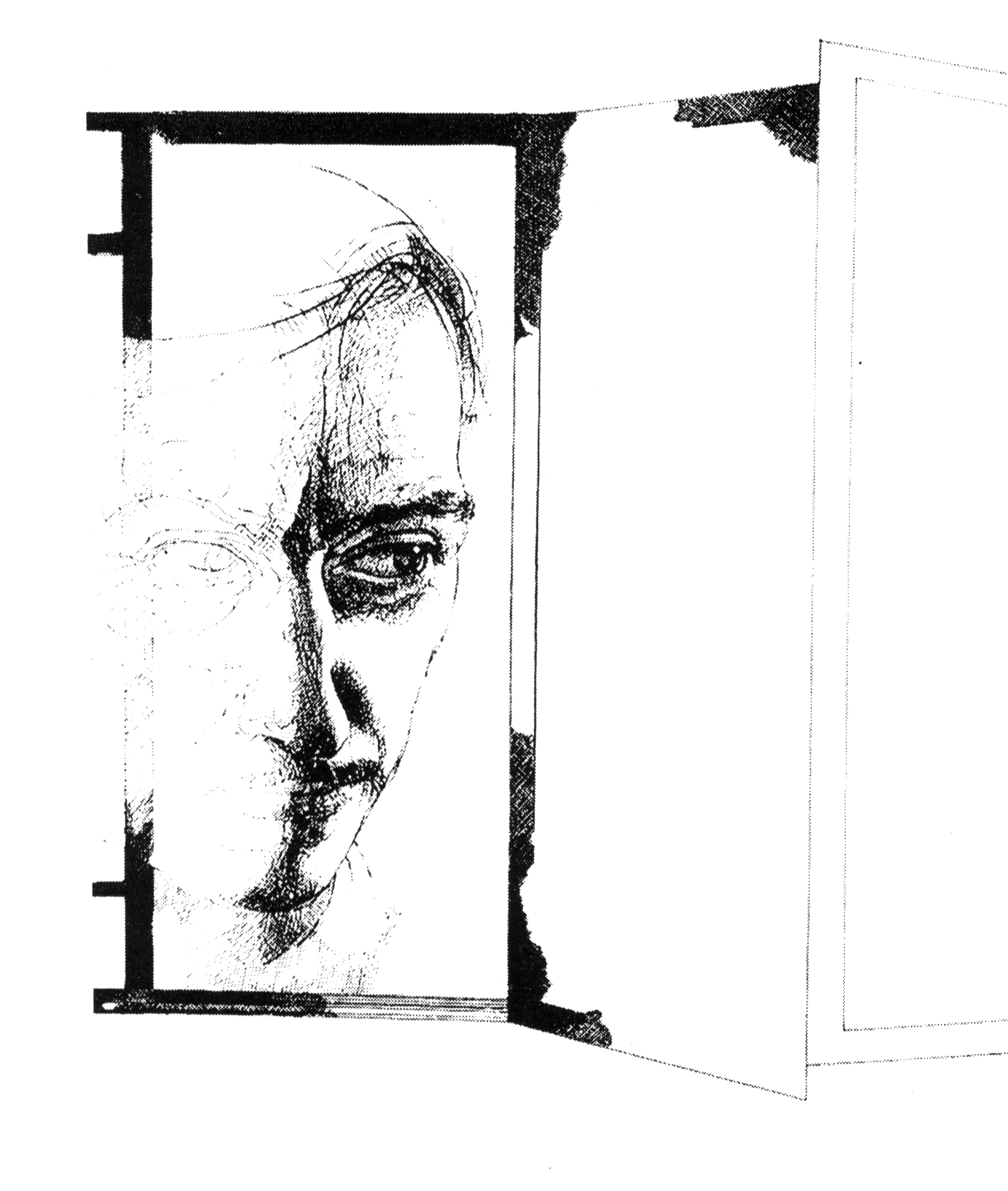
- Self Portrait (Detail), 1979
- Born: January 24, 1935; Satu Mare, Romania
- Died: March 16, 2017 (aged 82); Târgu Mureș, Romania
- Education: Ion Andreescu Fine Arts Institute from Cluj
- Known for: Sculpture, Painting, Drawing, Scenic design
- Awards: Meritul Cultural în grad de Cavaler, Order of Merit of the Republic of Hungary

József Haller (January 24, 1935 – March 2, 2017) was an ethnic Hungarian painter, illustrator and scenic designer from Satu Mare, Romania.

== Career ==
József Haller attended the School of Fine Arts in Cluj between 1949 and 1953 with a specialization in painting. He continued his studies at the Cluj-Napoca Academy of Arts during 1953–1959 with a specialization in sculpture under the masters Ion Irimescu, Artúr Vetró and András Kós. He was a member of the Romanian Fine Arts Union, the Barabas Miklós Guild as well as the National Association of Hungarian Artists. From 1959 until retirement, for 40 years, he was the scenic designer for the Youth and Puppet Theater Ariel, where he designed the scenery, the costumes and the puppets for more than 120 plays.

== Solo exhibits ==
- Târgu Mureș (1970, 1975, 1977, 1978, 1990, 1995, 2002, 2003, 2004, 2006, 2008, 2010, 2011, 2013, 2015);
- Satu Mare (1975, 1981);
- Siegen (1979);
- Cluj-Napoca (1981);
- Miercurea Ciuc (2003);
- Budapest: Újpest Gallery (2005);
- Budapest: Vármegye Gallery (2005).

== International group exhibits ==
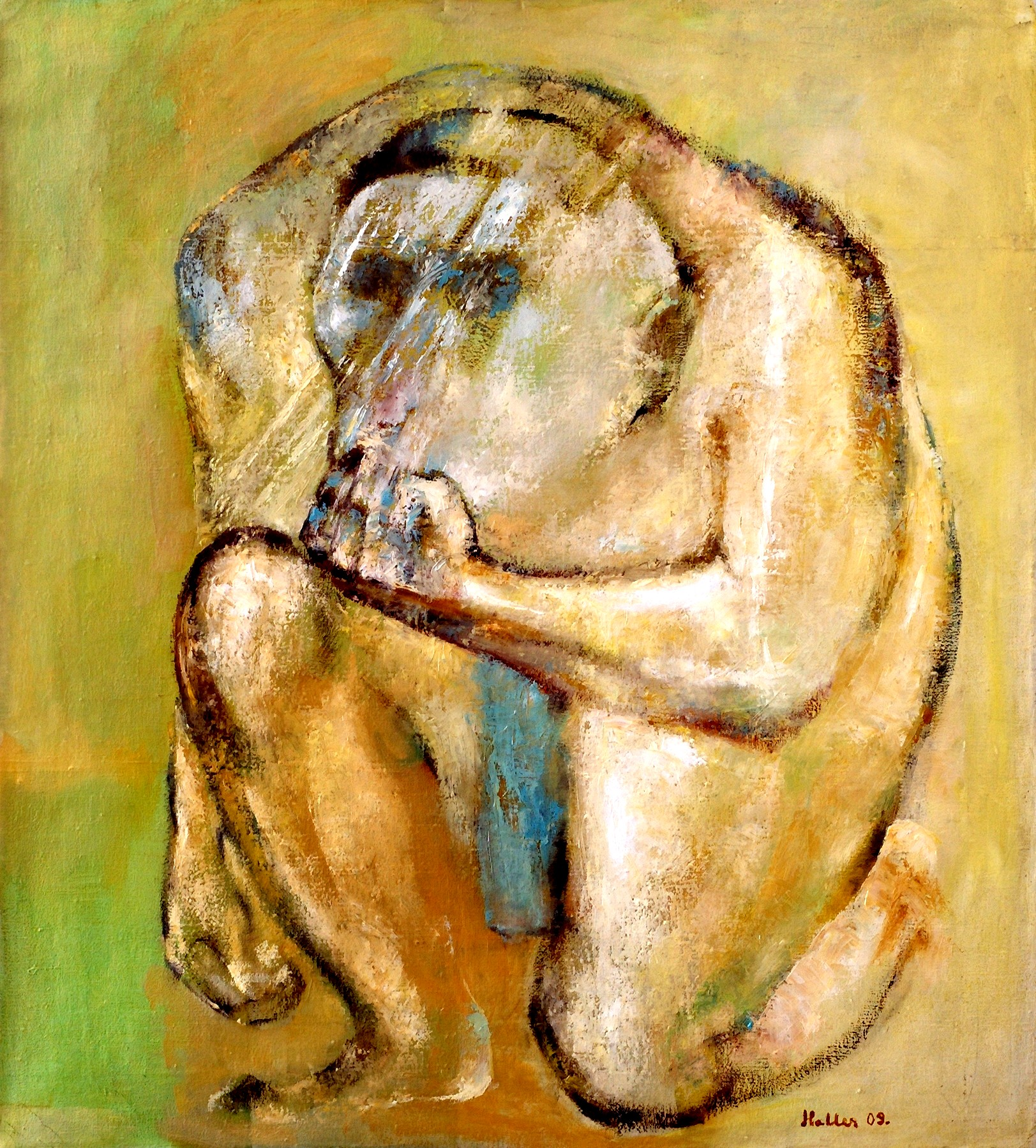
József Haller: Caliban, 2009

- Barcelona (Spain): Juan Miro International Graphic Exhibition, 1975;
- Mannheim (Germany): Contemporary Romanian Fine Art, 1979;
- Maastricht (The Netherlands): Romanian Graphics, 1982;
- Kraków (Poland): International Biennale of Graphic Work, 1985;
- Budapest (Hungary): Exhibit of Hungarian Fine Artists from Romania, 1990, 1992, 1993, 1995;
- Washington (USA): Exhibit of Hungarian Fine Artists from Transylvania, 1990;
- Stockholm (Sweden), 1994, 1996;
- Frankfurt (Germany): „Kaddisch”, 1995;
- Debrecen, Szarvas, Nyíregyháza (Hungary): 12 artists from Transylvania (1993);
- Budapest (Hungary), 1996;
- Kecskemét (Hungary): Contemporary Fine Arts from Tîrgu Mureș, 2000;
- Budapest (Hungary), ERNST Museum: Half-life (2002);
- Millenary tracks - 10 graphic artists from Romania: Rome, Paris, Berlin, Stockholm, Moscow, Bucharest, Budapest, 2005.

Creation camps: Iserlohn - Germany (1984, 1989, 1995, 1996, 1997, 1998, 2002, 2003), Lăzarea - Romania (1988), Cătălina – Romania (1992), Marcali - Hungary (1992), Zalaegerszeg – Hungary (1993), Bolyai creation camp in Tîrgu Mureș - Romania (2009).

== Illustrations ==
József Haller published a volume of illustrations under the title Arany alapra arannyal. Furthermore, he illustrated several volumes of poems from contemporary artists, such as Emese Egyed, Sándor Kányádi, András Ferenc Kovács, Béla Markó, Attila Nagy. He also frequently published illustrations on the pages of the literary magazine Igaz Szó.

== Awards ==
- Ordinul „23 August” (Romania, 1964);
- A Magyar Köztársasági Érdemrend kiskeresztje (Hungary, 1995);
- Diplomă de Onoare al Ministerului Culturii din România (Romania, 1995);
- Ordinul Meritul Cultural „Cavaler” al Ministerului Culturii din România (Romania, 2004);
- Several awards as puppet and scenic designer, including a Lifetime Achievement Award in 2004.

== Bibliography ==
- Cebuc A, Florea V., Lăptoiu. N.: Enciclopedia Artiștilor Români Contemporani. Editura ARC 2000 (2001).
- Banner Zoltán: Haller József. Marosvásárhely, Mentor Kiadó (2002). ISBN 973-599-005-9
- Barbosa, Octavian: Dicționarul artiștilor români contemporani, Editura Meridiane (1976).
- Pepino, Cristian (coord.): Dicționarul teatrului de păpuși, marionete și animație din România, Editura Alma (2000).
