= Albert Berzeviczy =

Hungarian politician

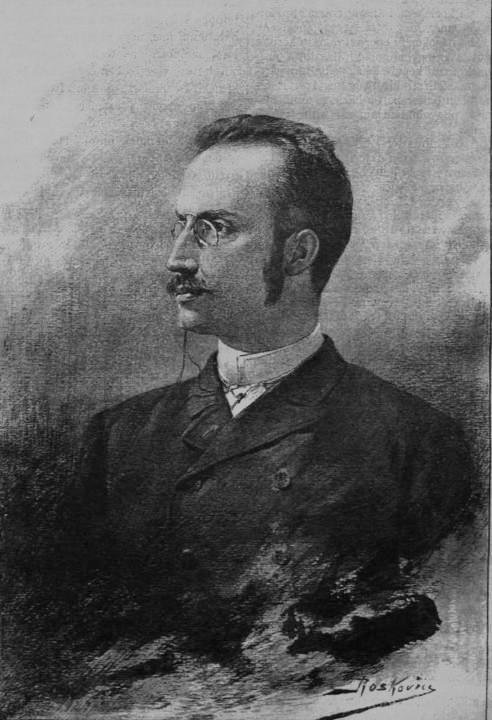

Minister of Religion and Education of Hungary
- In office 3 November 1903 – 18 June 1905
- Prime Minister: István Tisza
- Preceded by: Gyula Wlassics
- Succeeded by: György Lukács

Personal details
- Born: 7 June 1853 Berzevice, Sáros County, Kingdom of Hungary (today Brezovica, Sabinov District, Slovakia)
- Died: 22 March 1936 (aged 82) Budapest, Kingdom of Hungary
- Party: Liberal Party, National Party of Work
- Profession: politician, historian

Albert Berzeviczy de Berzevicze et Kakaslomnicz (Berzevice, 7 June 1853 – Budapest, 22 March 1936) was a Hungarian politician, who served as Minister of Religion and Education between 1903 and 1905.

== Career ==
He attended to the Law Academy of Kassa and to the University of Budapest. He acquired a doctorate in 1924. He worked as leading officer for Sáros County and taught in the Law Academy of Eperjes. His subjects were political science, economy and legal history. He served as Deputy Speaker of the House of Representatives between 1895 and 1898. István Tisza appointed him Minister of Education in 1903. Berzeviczy held this position until the Tisza Cabinet's fall.

When the Liberal Party, which controlled Hungary from 1875, collapsed, Berzeviczy joined to the newly forming National Club. For Berzeviczy's proposal, the party was renamed to Party of National Work. He was member of the House of Magnates from 1917 to 1918, and from 1927, when the upper house was reorganized.

His function expounded on the space of the culture and the science is considerable apart from his political career. He became a member of the Hungarian Academy of Sciences in 1903, and was appointed president of the organization in 1905. From 1923 until his death he served as chairman of the Kisfaludy Society. From 1932 he was the chairman of the Hungarian PEN Club. He was corresponding member of the Austrian Academy of Sciences and the German Academy of Sciences Leopoldina. He was founding member of the Matthias Corvinus Academy of Sciences, which cultivated the connections between the Hungarians and the Italians.

Political offices
| Preceded by Gyula Wlassics | Minister of Religion and Education; 1903–1905 | Succeeded by György Lukács |
| Preceded by Sándor Gál | Speaker of the House of Representatives; 1910–1911 | Succeeded by Lajos Návay |
Cultural offices
| Preceded by Loránd Eötvös | President of the Hungarian Academy of Sciences; 1905–1936 | Succeeded by Archduke Joseph |
