= Jenő Zichy =

Hungarian politician (1837–1906)

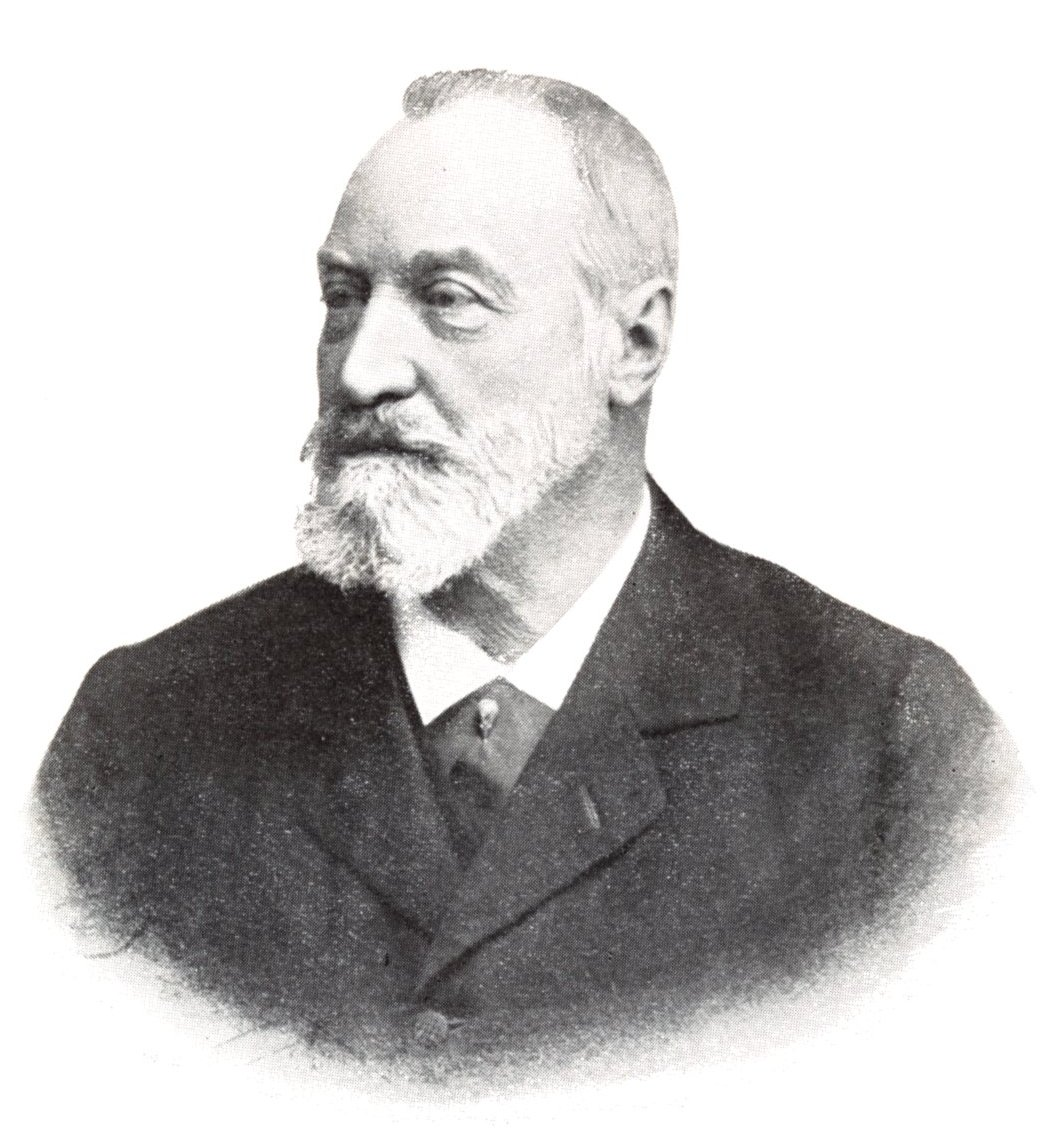
Jenő Zichy

Count Jenő Zichy (5 July 1837, Sárszentmihály - Merano, 26 December 1906, Merano), was a Hungarian nobleman, writer, orientalist and politician.

== The Zichy expeditions ==
Zichy was interested in uncovering the "cradle of Magyardom" and funded a number of expeditions.

He is buried in the Kerepesi Cemetery, Budapest.
