= Sándor Popovics =

Hungarian politician (born 1935)

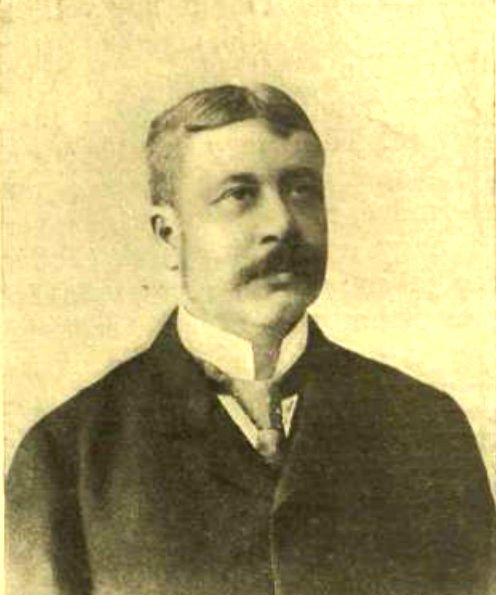

Minister of Finance of Hungary
- In office 11 February 1918 – 31 October 1918
- Preceded by: Sándor Wekerle
- Succeeded by: Mihály Károlyi

Personal details
- Born: 22 October 1862 Pest, Kingdom of Hungary
- Died: 15 April 1935 (aged 72) Budapest, Kingdom of Hungary
- Party: National Constitution Party
- Spouse: Anna Azary
- Children: Margit; Sándor; Miklós
- Profession: politician, economist

Sándor Popovics (22 October 1862 – 15 April 1935) was a Hungarian politician, who served as Minister of Finance in 1918. He was the governor of the Austro-Hungarian Bank between 1909 and 1918. During the peace negotiations in 1920, he attended as a financial expert. From 1924 until his death he served as chairman of the National Bank of Hungary. Popovics was full member of the Hungarian Academy of Sciences.

== Works ==
- A pénz sorsa a háborúban (The fate of the currency in the war), Budapest, 1926.
- A pénz értékállandósága (The constant of the currency's value), Budapest, 1929.
- A társadalmi szervezkedések gazdasági hatásai (The economic effects of the social organisations), Budapest, 1931.

Political offices
Preceded by Sándor Wekerle	Minister of Finance; 1918	Succeeded by Mihály Károlyi
