= Elemér Hantos =

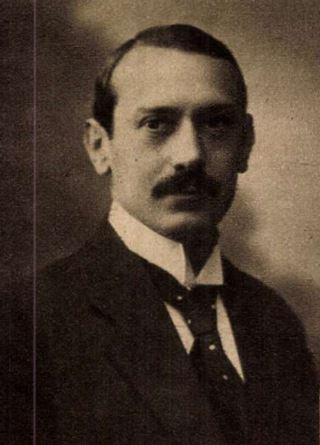
Hantos Elemér

Elemér Hantos (12 November 1880 – 27 July 1942) was a Hungarian economist and one of the principal promoters of Central European and Paneuropean integration during the interwar period. He was born and died in Budapest.

== Youth and education ==
After graduating from the Lutheran High School of Sopron, he studied Law and Political Sciences at the University of Budapest. After study visits in Vienna, Leipzig, Paris, Cambridge and Oxford, Hantos obtained a doctorate at the University of Budapest. Shortly after his studies, Elemér Hantos became a financial expert in Budapest.

== Political and academic career ==
Elemér Hantos embarked on a political career in 1910 and became a member of the Hungarian Parliament for the National Party of Work. During World War I, Hantos published several books on the Austro-Hungarian wartime public finances. His financial expertise propelled him Secretary of State at the Hungarian Ministry of Trade in 1917. As a representative of the Hungarian government, Hantos participated in negotiations between Germany and Austria-Hungary on a customs union.

In 1918, Hantos was appointed president of the Postal Savings Bank, which served for a brief period as the Hungarian central bank after the break-up of the Austro-Hungarian monarchy. In parallel to his political career, Hantos started to teach Finance at the University of Budapest in 1917.

After the break-up of the Austro-Hungarian monarchy, Elemér Hantos abandoned his political career in Hungary and dedicated himself to the promotion of Central European integration. In 1924, Hantos became an expert at the Economic Committee of the League of Nations, where he addressed the economic problems in Central Europe. During the interwar period, Hantos promoted Central European integration by publishing several books and by conducting conferences on the economic situation in Central Europe.

== Mitteleuropa ==
During the interwar period, the new borders created by the Peace Treaties of Trianon and Saint-Germain-en-Laye were hindering economic trade in Central Europe. To remedy the situation, Elemér Hantos wanted to recreate the economic area of the Austro-Hungarian monarchy, extended to the new borders of the successor states, however without restoring the pre-war political order. To promote his idea of Central European economic integration, Elemér Hantos organised the first Central European Economic Conference with Julius Meinl in Vienna in 1925. Within the Central European Economic Conferences, two visions of Mitteleuropa were confronted: while Hantos and his followers promoted the economic rapprochement of the successor states of the Austro-Hungarian monarchy, the German and some Austrian representatives were opposed to the exclusion of Germany from the Central European economic area.

As the German vision was more and more dominant within the Central European Economic Conference at the end of the 1920s, Elemér Hantos decided to create the Central European Institutes in Vienna (January 1929), Brno (September 1929) and Budapest (Mai 1930), and the Central European Study Centre in Geneva, as an alternative to the Central European Economic Conference.

== Paneuropa ==
Elemér Hantos was a founding member of the Hungarian section of Paneuropean Union, created by count Richard Coudenhove-Kalergi. Hantos participated in numerous Paneuropean conferences, facilitating the elaboration of the economic programme of the Paneuropean Union.

== Selected publications ==
English

- Hantos, Elemér, The Magna Carta of the English and of the Hungarian Constitution: a Comparative View of the Law and Institutions of the Early Middle Ages, London: K. Paul & Co., 1904.
- Hantos, Elemér, Memorandum on the Economic Problems of the Danube States, Budapest: Athenaeum, 1933.

German

- Hantos, Elemér, Die Zukunft des Geldes, Stuttgart: F. Enke, 1921.
- Hantos, Elemér, Das Geldproblem in Mitteleuropa, Jena: G. Fischer, 1925.
- Hantos, Elemér, Die Handelspolitik in Mitteleuropa, Jena: G. Fischer, 1925.
- Hantos, Elemér, Das Kulturproblem in Mitteleuropa, Stuttgart: F. Enke, 1926.
- Hantos, Elemér, Europäischer Zollverein und mitteleuropäische Wirtschaftsgemeinschaft, Berlin: Organisation Verlagsgesellschaft (S. Hirzel), 1928.
- Hantos, Elemér, Der Weg zum neuen Mitteleuropa, Berlin: Mitteleuropa-Verlag, 1933.
- Hantos, Elemér, Die Neuordnung des Donauraumes, Berlin : C. Heymann/ Wien : Österreichischer Wirtschaftsverlag (Payer & Co.), 1935
- Pallai, László, A közép-európai egységtörekvések egy elfeledett magyar képviselője: Hantos Elemér. Debreceni Szemle, 1996/4, pp. 581–590.
- Zsugyel, János, Hantos Elemér útja a nagytérgazdaság eszméjétől a közép-európai országok átfogó együttműködésének gondolatáig, Polgári Szemle, June 2009.

== Bibliography ==
- Godeffroy, Gabriel, “Entre Mitteleuropa et Paneuropa : le projet d’Elemér Hantos dans l'entre-deux-guerres”, Bulletin de l'Institut Pierre Renouvin, vol. 43, 2016, pp. 63–74. (URL : http://www.cairn.info/revue-bulletin-de-l-institut-pierre-renouvin-2016-1-page-63.htm)
- Hantos, Elemér Jr.: “Biography of Dr. Elemér Hantos: Father of the European idea”, Dr. Elemér Hantos Prize (URL: http://www.hantosprize.org/biography.htm)
- Müller, Nils, “Die Wirtschaft als ‘Brücke der Politik’: Elemér Hantos’ wirtschaftspolitisches Programm in den 1920er und 1930er Jahren”, in Sachse, Carola (ed.), “Mitteleuropa” und “Südosteuropa” als Planungsraum: Wirtschafts- und kulturpolitische Expertisen im Zeitalter der Weltkriege, Göttingen: Wallstein Verlag, 2010, pp. 87–114.
- Németh, István, “Die mitteleuropäische Alternative von Elemér Hantos in den 1920er und 1930er Jahren” in Duchhardt, Heinz/ Németh, István, Der Europa-Gedanke in Ungarn und Deutschland in der Zwischenkriegszeit, Mainz: von Zabern, 2005, pp. 71–98.
- Zsugyel János, "The journey of Elemér Hantos from the idea of large-scale economy to the idea of comprehensive cooperation of Central European countries", polgariszemle.hu. June 2009. Accessed 30 March 2024.
