= Stevan V. Popović =

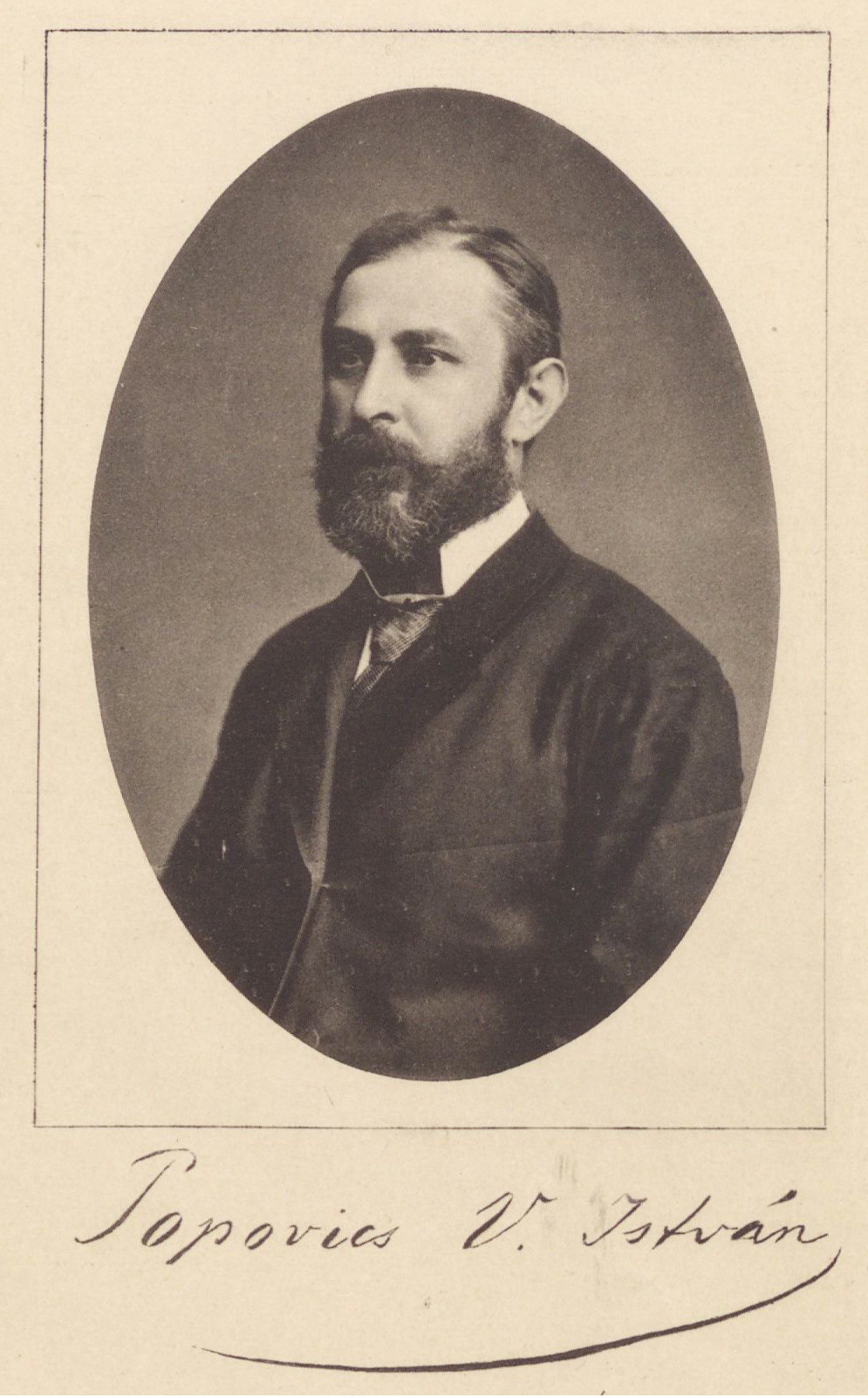
Popovics Vazul István, 1883

Stevan V. Popović (Bečej, 22 September 1845 - Zagreb, 6 February 1918) was a Serbian cultural leader in Austria-Hungary and a long-time manager of the Budapest Tekelijanum. He was the tutor of King Peter Karađorđević and his two brothers Arsen and George, and a publisher of children's literature.

== Biography ==
Stevan V. Popović was born on 22 September 1845 in a wealthy family in Stari Bečej. His father's name was Vasa, and his mother's name was Sofia. He was educated in Sremski Karlovci, where, thanks to his great success, he enjoyed the "blessings" introduced by Metropolitan Stevan Stratimirović. After finishing High School there, he went to Pest, where he continued his education, and then he enrolled in law school at the University of Pest. Between 1861 and 1867, he was a cadet of Tekelijanum, where he became a member of the Serbian student association Preodnica and the United Serb Youth.

In 1862, at the celebration of the day of Saint Sava in Tekelijanum, Prince Aleksandar Karađorđević also appeared, who was living in exile in Pest at the time. On that day, a solemn sermon was given by cadet Stevan V. Popović, which was very well received by those present. That was the reason why Princess Persida asked him to accept to teach her children Arsen, George and Peter Karađorđević. Popović performed this duty until 1868. Prince Alexander was satisfied with the work of Stevan V. Popović, as evidenced by the "Testimony" he issued in Vienna on 7 January 1870.

After completing his law studies, he was appointed director of the Serbian Buda School, and in 1871 he was appointed supervisor of the Diocese of Bačka and Buda.

He was the first in Serbian literature to prepare a collection of poems for children (Pest, 1872). He founded the Children's World Library.

Stevan V. Popović, also known as Vacki, was a member of the Hungarian Parliament and the Croatian Parliament. He ended his political career under the auspices of the Hungarian government as a great Serbian populist and supporter of Svetozar Miletić. He was twice the editor of the Novi Sad Zastava (1870-1872 and 1874-1875). As the editor-in-chief of that progressive newspaper, he was sentenced by a court article "So Front to the Hungarian Reform published on 3 February 1871. The court sentenced him to 18 months in prison and a fine of 1,000 florins. He was imprisoned in the infamous Austro-Hungarian prison in Vacki. He later reconciled with the Hungarian authorities and remained a member of "Kuen's Serbian Club" until his death. He was a royal adviser from 1899, then received the nobility and the predicate "Frushkogorski", and finally, in 1909 he became a courtier. He was the last elected Hungarian Member of Parliament in Uzdin in 1910. As a skilled politician, he managed to reconcile his loyalty to the Austro-Hungarian monarchy and remain a great Serbian patriot at the same time. He was remembered as an excellent and ardent speaker who fought for the rights of Serbs in the Austro-Hungarian monarchy.

Stevan V. Popović wrote songs and short stories for children, and he is also important in Serbian publishing and journalism. He is also important in compiling, editing and publishing Serbian calendars and anthologies for Serbian children in Austria-Hungary. He was a close friend of poet Mita Popović.

He was married to Justina Kukin who came from Zbeg. He had three children: Ljubica, Pera and Laza. Ljubica and Pera died early, and Laza had a long career.

In 1882, he became the manager of Tekelijanum. "Uncle Steve", as everyone called him out of respect, remained in this position until his sudden death on 6 February 1918. Popović died in Kostanc near Lake Constance and was buried in Zagreb. In the old days, he handed over his property to the Fruska Gora monastery Privina Glava, and in return received an appanage from the monastery's income.

== Publishing credits ==
- Radovan (1876, Novi Sad) - for children
- Illustrated war chronicle (1877, Novi Sad)
- Serbian illustrated newspaper (1881-1882, Novi Sad)
- Njiva - a farming weekly
- Voice of the People (magazine)
- Calendars

Čika-Steva V. Popović was the owner and editor of the Orla calendar (Eagle, large illustrated calendar, published from 1875 to 1904 in Novi Sad); Caric, small calendar with pictures (1878-1894, Novi Sad); Prijatelj narodni, calendar with pictures (1915, Budapest); Eagle [3].

Also, he published pedagogical editions such as School and Life (Pest, 1868); Serbian Folk School (Pest, 1870, 1871, 1872); and Song collections:

- Wreath of Poems (Pest, 1872) - for children
- Christmas gift (Novi Sad, 1872) - different songs
- The Great Serbian Reciter (Novi Sad, 1879) - patriotic songs
- Serbian reciter (Novi Sad, 1879) - patriotic songs
- Small fiddles (Novi Sad, 1881) - mixed songs
- Polaženik (Novi Sad, 1886)
- Christmas Eve (Novi Sad, 1891)
- Christmas (Pančevo, 1876)
- Pictures and Opportunities (Pest, 1872)
- Radovan's Gift (Novi Sad, 1876)
- Holidays (Novi Sad, 1878)
- Bosilje (Novi Sad, 1880)
- Radovan (Belgrade, 1883)
- Anthologies of short stories
- Day and Night (Novi Sad, 1877)
- Marigold flowers (Budapest, 1877)
- Children's joy (Novi Sad, 1878)
- Mali svet (Novi Sad, 1882)
- Zastava, Novi Sad 1918.

== Literature ==
- Mara Knežević, Stevan V. Popović in Serbian Culture (2006, Sombor)
- Slavica Glišić, Srpska Bibliografija (Belgrade, 1989).
- Memoirs of Proteus Stevan Champrag (2001, Szentandre)
