= Gyula Kovács (politician, born 1874) =

Hungarian politician (1874–1963)

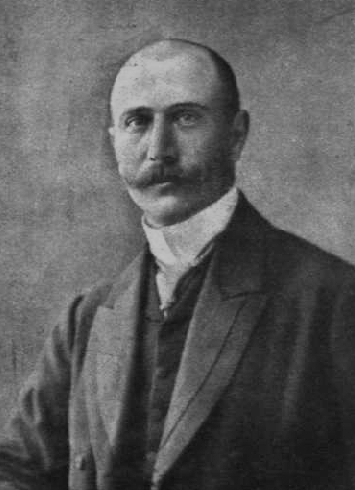
- Gyula Kovács in 1912 (Vasárnapi Újság)

Member of the House of Representatives
- In office 1910–1913

Personal details
- Born: 4 October 1874 Felsőireg, Austria-Hungary
- Died: 10 October 1963 (aged 89) Ventura, California, United States
- Party: National Independence Agrarian Party of '48; Party of Independence and '48
- Profession: politician

Gyula Kovács (4 October 1874 – 10 October 1963) was a Hungarian politician, Member of Parliament, who attempted to assassinate House Speaker István Tisza on 7 June 1912.

== Early life and career ==
Kovács was born in Felsőireg, Tolna County, today part of Iregszemcse, which established from the merger of Felsőireg and Szemcséd in 1938. He finished his secondary studies in Pécs, where he joined Royal Hungarian Honvéd as a volunteer. He became a reserve Lieutenant at 44th Regiment. After that he attended Hochschule für Bodenkultur in Vienna, then he went on an economical study tour to abroad. Returning to home, he began intensive farming on his estate in Tolna County and soon became a spokesperson for local farmers.

He joined National Independence Agrarian Party of '48, led by István Szabó de Nagyatád, and was elected a member of the House of Representatives for Gyoma (today Gyomaendrőd) in the 1910 parliamentary election. However, Kovács shortly left the agrarian party for the Gyula Justh-led parliamentary group of the divided Party of Independence and '48.

== Tisza assassination attempt ==
Former Prime Minister (1903–1905) and incumbent legislative speaker (1912–1913) István Tisza supported the reform of the common Austro-Hungarian Army to enhance the military power of the dual monarchy. In contrast, Independence Party was fighting for more Hungarian interests (i.e. use of the Hungarian language of command in the army). Tisza strongly pushed against opposition obstruction. He did not allow the opposition to speak up regarding rules of House of Parliament. Referring to an act of 1848, he called for the police force to force out numerous opposition representatives, including Kovács. Tisza managed to pass the Act of Protection, resulting in the removal of some members of the opposition party, on 4 June 1912.

As a result, the enraged Kovács, attempted to assassinate Tisza in the Hungarian Parliament Building on 7 June 1912. He had yelled, while jumped off the journalists' gallery: "There is still a member of the opposition!", and fired three times at Tisza. His shots, however, missed and the marks are still visible in the Parliament Building to this day. With his last shot, Kovács tried to kill himself, but he survived without a permanent head injury. Tisza then continued the session.

Later, Kovács was tried but acquitted, referring to "deeper disturbance of consciousness". In 1913, he resigned his mandate and retired from politics. In 1939, he immigrated to the United States.
