= Sándor Wekerle =

Hungarian politician (1848–1921)

Dr. Sándor Wekerle
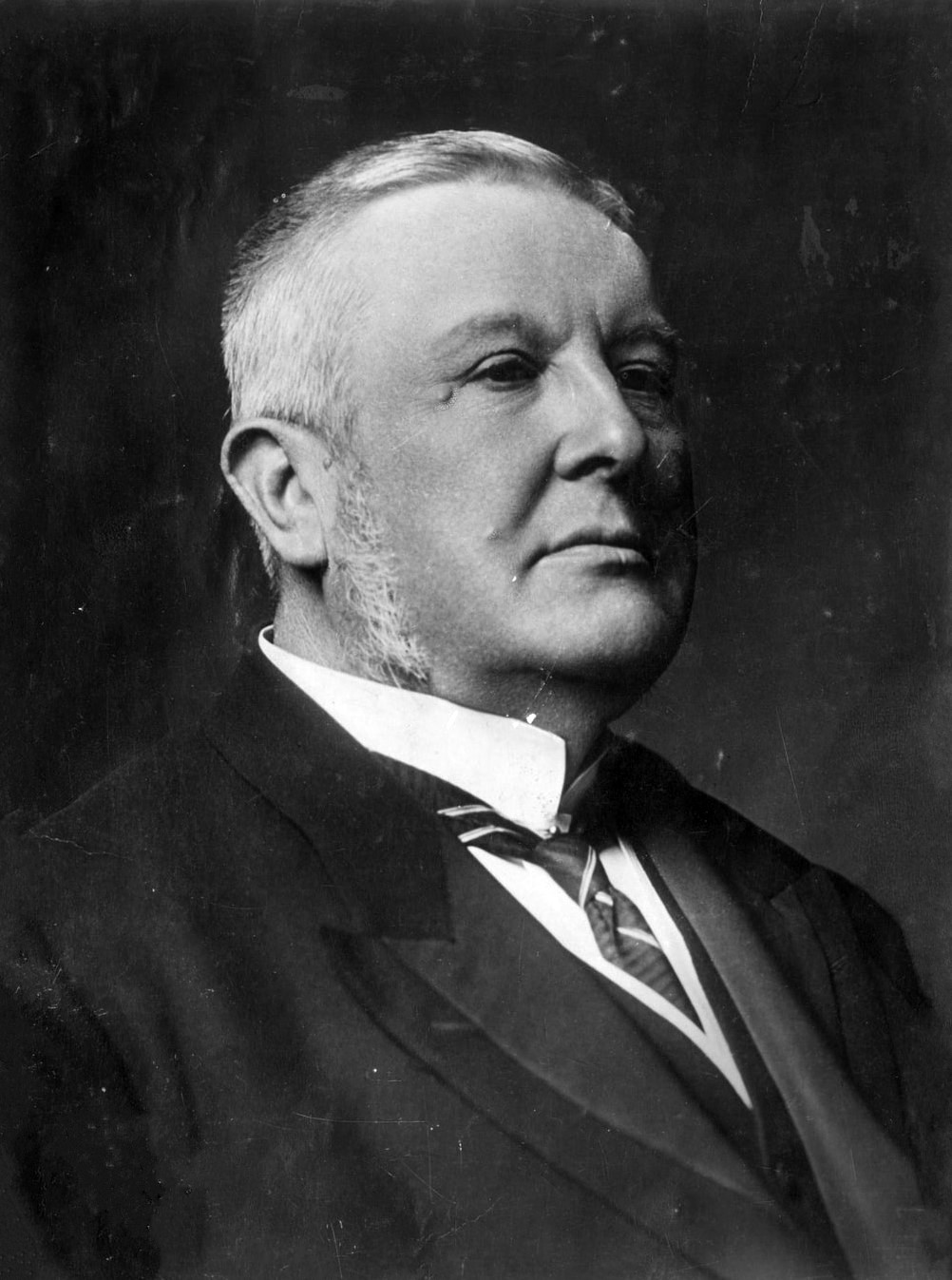
- Werkele in 1918

Prime Minister of the Kingdom of Hungary
- In office 17 November 1892 – 14 January 1895
- Monarch: Francis Joseph I
- Preceded by: Gyula Szapáry
- Succeeded by: Dezső Bánffy
- In office 8 April 1906 – 17 January 1910
- Monarch: Francis Joseph I
- Preceded by: Géza Fejérváry
- Succeeded by: Károly Khuen-Héderváry
- In office 20 August 1917 – 30 October 1918
- Monarch: Charles IV
- Preceded by: Móric Esterházy
- Succeeded by: János Hadik

Personal details
- Born: 14 November 1848 Mór, Kingdom of Hungary, Austrian Empire
- Died: 26 August 1921 (aged 72) Budapest, Kingdom of Hungary
- Party: Liberal Party (1906); National Constitution Party (1906–1918); Constitution Party of '48 (1918)
- Spouse: Gizella Molnár
- Children: Sándor
- Education: University of Pest (JD)
- Profession: Jurist; Politician

Sándor Wekerle (English: Alexander Wekerle; 14 November 1848 – 26 August 1921) was a Hungarian politician who served three times as prime minister. He was the first non-noble to hold the office in Hungary.

== Biography ==
He was born in Mór to a Danube Swabian family, on his fathers side, in the comitatus of Fejér. His father Wekerle Sándor (senior) (1811–1890) served as the estate manager for the Lamberg family, his mother was Antónia Szép. He completed his secondary education at the Cistercian Saint Stephen grammar school in Székesfehérvár. After studying law at the Faculty of Law of the University of Budapest he graduated doctor juris. He then entered the government service, and after a period of probation was appointed to a post in the ministry of finance. He still, however, continued an academic career by lecturing on political economy at the university.

Alongside his public offices, Sándor Wekerle was also an agricultural entrepreneur, modernizing his estates to the highest standards of the time, where he established a mill, a distillery, and an electric power plant.

In 1886 Wekerle was elected to the House of Deputies, became in the same year financial secretary of state, and in 1889 succeeded Kálmán Tisza as minister of finance. He immediately addressed himself to the task of improving the financial position of the country, carried out the conversion of the state loans, and succeeded, for the first time in the history of the Hungarian budget, in avoiding a deficit.

In November 1892 Wekerle succeeded Count Gyula Szapáry as premier, though still retaining the portfolio of finance. At the head of a strong government he was enabled, in spite of a powerful opposition of Catholics and Magnates, to carry in 1894 the Civil Marriage Bill. The continued opposition of the clerical party, however, brought about his resignation on 22 December 1894, when he was succeeded by Dezső Bánffy. On 1 January 1897 he was appointed president of the newly created judicial commission at Budapest, and for the next few years held aloof from politics, even under the ex-lex government of Khuen-Héderváry. On the reconciliation of the king-emperor with the coalition he was therefore selected as the most suitable man to lead the new government, and on 8 April 1906 was appointed prime minister, taking at the same time the portfolio of finance. He resigned the premiership on 27 April 1909, but was not relieved of his office until the formation of the Khuen-Héderváry cabinet on 17 January 1910.

Wekerle returned to power in 1917, and served for the last year of the First World War. As in his 1906 to 1910 ministry, Wekerle was largely acting as a figurehead for a coalition of stronger personalities around him. Although, towards its end, the ministry began to move in the direction of an expansion of the Hungarian franchise, events, particularly the imminent military defeat of Austria-Hungary and its allies, moved too fast for it, and Wekerle resigned in October 1918.

During the time of the Hungarian Soviet Republic, Wekerle was held prisoner as a hostage.

== Legacy ==
Wekerle died in Budapest, aged 72. He is credited with the introduction of money based on the gold standard in 1892.

In the south of Budapest, the notable Wekerle estate (Wekerletelep) neighbourhood is named after him. Built before World War II, its central square was designed by the architect Károly Kós. The neighbourhood provided affordable housing to working-class families in a green, open and familiar setting. This was an early example of a planned residential neighbourhood in Europe.

Due to the political changes that occurred after his death, Sándor Wekerle's contributions were not appropriately recognized in Hungary, neither during the interwar period nor in the post-1945 era.

Following the fall of communism in 1990, historians, financial and economic experts, as well as politicians, began to reevaluate and acknowledge his achievements as a statesman and financial expert. In 2006, the Wekerle Sándor Business School was named in his honor. In 2008, a public initiative led to the erection of his first public statue in the Wekerletelep district of Kispest. From 2011 to 2012, the Ministry of Public Administration and Justice operated a grant management institution named Wekerle Sándor Fund Management. In 2012, the Ministry of National Economy launched the "Wekerle Plan," a growth strategy for the Hungarian economy on a Carpathian Basin scale.

In Mór, the preservation of his memory was initially supported by local patriotic intellectuals. In 1988, a memorial plaque was placed at his birthplace on the initiative of the then director of the city library. In 1992, the Wekerle Sándor Association was founded. In 1990, the city's first freely elected local government restored one of its main streets with the name Wekerle Sándor. In 1993, the local government posthumously awarded him the title of honorary citizen. The modern leisure center built in 2002 in Mór also bears Wekerle Sándor's name.

In 2011, through a civic initiative involving the political leadership of Mór, civil organizations, economic stakeholders, and the local population's exemplary cooperation, a full-length public monument was erected as part of the Wekerle Memorial Year.

=== Works ===
- Die passive Handelsbilanz; Manzsche-Buchhandl, Wien, 1913
- A háború gazdasági következményei; Pallas, Bp., 1915 (Hadi beszédek)
- Wekerle Sándor beszédei; Középeurópai Közgazdasági Egyesület, Bp., 1918

== Honours ==
=== Civil appointments ===
- Privy Councillor, 1891

=== Orders and decorations ===
- Austria-Hungary:
  - Order of thr Iron Crown, 3rd class (1884)
  - Order of thr Iron Crown, 1st class (1892)
  - Order of Saint Stephen of Hungary, Grand Cross (1907)
  - Order of Leopold, Grand Cross (1907)
- Prussia:
  - Order of the Red Eagle, Grand Cross (1893)
  - Order of Merit of the Prussian Crown, Grand Cross (1906)
- Bavaria: Order of Merit of the Bavarian Crown, Grand Cross (1908)

== Notes ==
Political offices
Preceded by Kálmán Tisza	Minister of Finance; 1889–1895	Succeeded by László Lukács
Preceded by Gyula Szapáry	Prime Minister of Hungary; 1892–1895	Succeeded by Dezső Bánffy
Preceded by Géza Fejérváry	Prime Minister of Hungary; 1906–1910	Succeeded by Károly Khuen-Héderváry
Preceded by Ferenc Hegedűs	Minister of Finance; 1906–1910	Succeeded by László Lukács
Preceded by Béla Pap	Minister of Defence; Acting; 1906	Succeeded by Lajos Jekelfalussy
Preceded by Stjepan Kovačević	Minister of Croatian Affairs; Acting; 1906	Succeeded by Gejza Josipović
Preceded by Antal Günther	Minister of Justice; 1909–1910	Succeeded by Ferenc Székely
Preceded by Móric Esterházy	Prime Minister of Hungary; 1917–1918	Succeeded by János Hadik
Preceded by Gusztáv Gratz	Minister of Finance; Acting; 1917–1918	Succeeded by Sándor Popovics
Preceded by Béla Mezőssy	Minister of Agriculture; Acting; 1918	Succeeded by Béla Serényi
Preceded by János Tóth	Minister of the Interior; Acting; 1918	Succeeded by Tivadar Batthyány
