= János Tóth (politician) =

Hungarian politician (1864–1929)

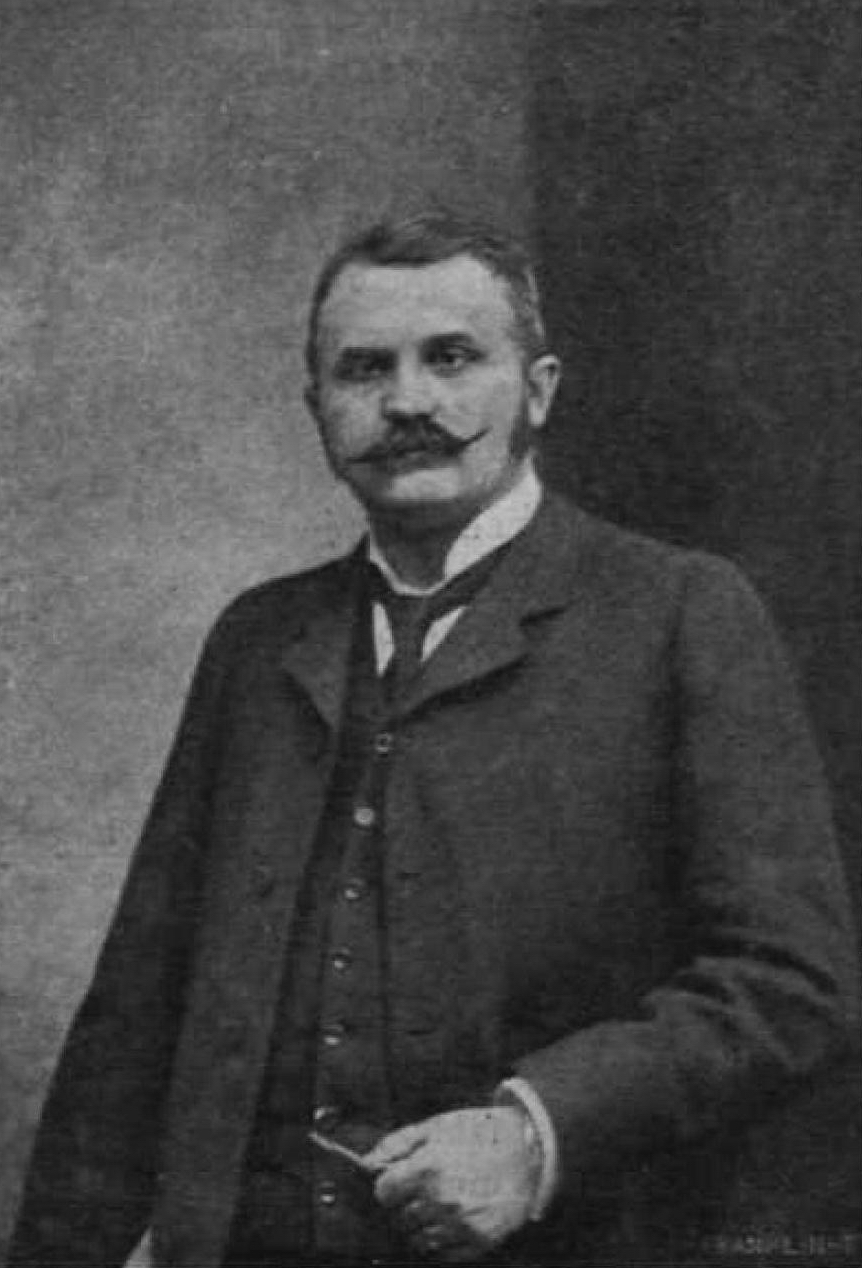

Minister of the Interior of Hungary
- In office 25 January 1918 – 8 May 1918
- Preceded by: Gábor Ugron
- Succeeded by: Sándor Wekerle

Personal details
- Born: 16 July 1864 Túrkeve, Kingdom of Hungary, Austrian Empire
- Died: 23 December 1929 (aged 65) Budapest, Hungary
- Party: Independence Party
- Profession: politician

János Tóth (16 July 1864 – 23 December 1929) was a Hungarian politician, who served as Interior Minister in 1918.

Political offices
Preceded by Gábor Ugron	Minister of the Interior; 1918	Succeeded by Sándor Wekerle
