= Béla Barabás =

Hungarian politician, jurist and author (1855–1934)

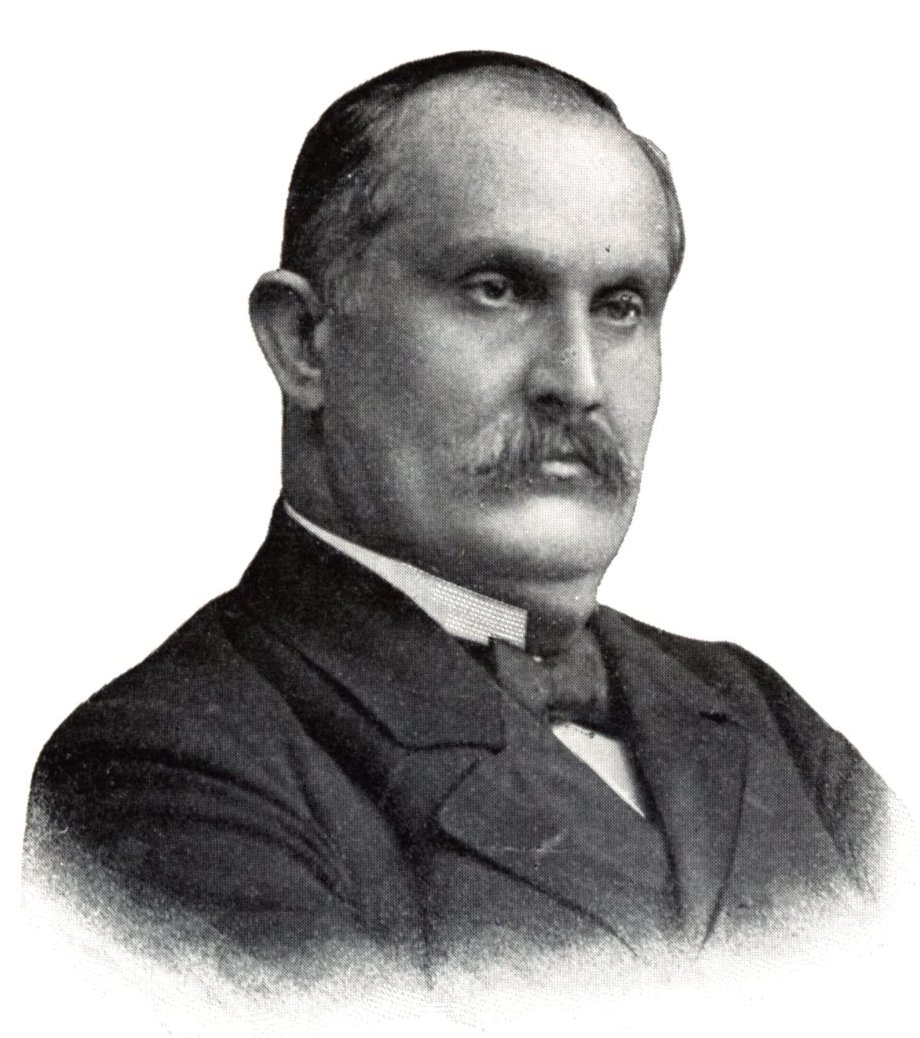

Member of the House of Representatives
- In office 1892–1910
- In office 1911–1917

Member of the Senate of Romania
- In office 1926–1927

Personal details
- Born: 12 December 1855 Arad, Kingdom of Hungary
- Died: 28 May 1934 (aged 78) Arad, Kingdom of Romania
- Party: Party of Independence and '48, Magyar Party
- Profession: politician, jurist, author

Béla Barabás (12 December 1855 – 28 May 1934) was a Hungarian politician, jurist and author.

He studied in Kolozsvár (present-day Cluj-Napoca, Romania). He graduated law studies at the University of Budapest in 1879. Barabás became leader of the Independence Party in his birthplace city of Arad. He was a member of the House of Representatives (lower house of the Diet of Hungary) between 1892 and 1910, and he was one of the leading figures in the opposition's obstruction during the Hungarian Constitutional Crisis of 1903–1907. At the occasion of 1910 elections he lost his mandate, but one year later he gained a seat in a by-election. In 1914 he went with Mihály Károlyi to the United States tour. He became lord lieutenant of Arad County in 1917.

After the Treaty of Trianon Barabás stayed in Transylvania and soon became one of the leaders of the Hungarian minority. He was a deputy chairman of the Magyar Party since 1922. He became a member of the Senate of Romania in 1926. Barabás also had a significant journalistic activity in local and national newspapers. He was editor of the Arad és Vidéke (Arad and its Region) for a short time. He served as chief editor of Aradi Magyar Újság (Hungarian Journal in Arad) from 1926 to 1927.

== Works ==
- Amikor Kossuth Lajost hazahívták (Cegléd, 1923) (When Lajos Kossuth was called home)
- Emlékirataim (Arad, 1929). (Memoirs)
