= Order of Leopold (Austria) =

Chivalrous order of Austria

Austrian Imperial Order of Leopold
- Grand Cross Star of the order

Awarded by The Head of the House of Habsburg-Lorraine
- Type: Dynastic order
- Royal house: House of Habsburg-Lorraine
- Motto: INTEGRITATI ET MERITO and OPES REGUM CORDA SUBDITORUM
- Awarded for: Military merit
- Status: Dormant
- Sovereign: Karl von Habsburg
- Grades: Grand Cross; First Class; Commander; Knight

Precedence
- Next (higher): Order of Saint Stephen of Hungary
- Next (lower): Order of the Iron Crown (Austria)
- Equivalent: Order of the Starry Cross
- Ribbon of the order (except 1st Class)

The Austrian Imperial Order of Leopold (German: Österreichisch-kaiserlicher Leopold-Orden) (Hungarian: Osztrák Császári Lipót-rend) was founded by Franz I of Austria on 8 January 1808 for military merit. The order's statutes stipulated only three grades: Grand Cross, Commander and Knight. During the war, in common with the other Austrian and later Austro-Hungarian decorations, war decoration (represented by a laurel wreath) and/or swords were added to reward meritorious service and bravery in the face of the enemy.

An Imperial Decree of 1 February 1901 ordered that in future, the senior grade would be split into two separate awards. From then onwards, there were four ranks: Grand Cross, First Class, Commander, Knight.

Until 18 July 1884, the award of the order also entitled the recipient, if he was not already of that standing, to be raised to the following appointments and/or ranks of the nobility:

- Grand Cross: Privy Councillor
- Commander: Baron
- Knight: Ritter

== Insignia ==
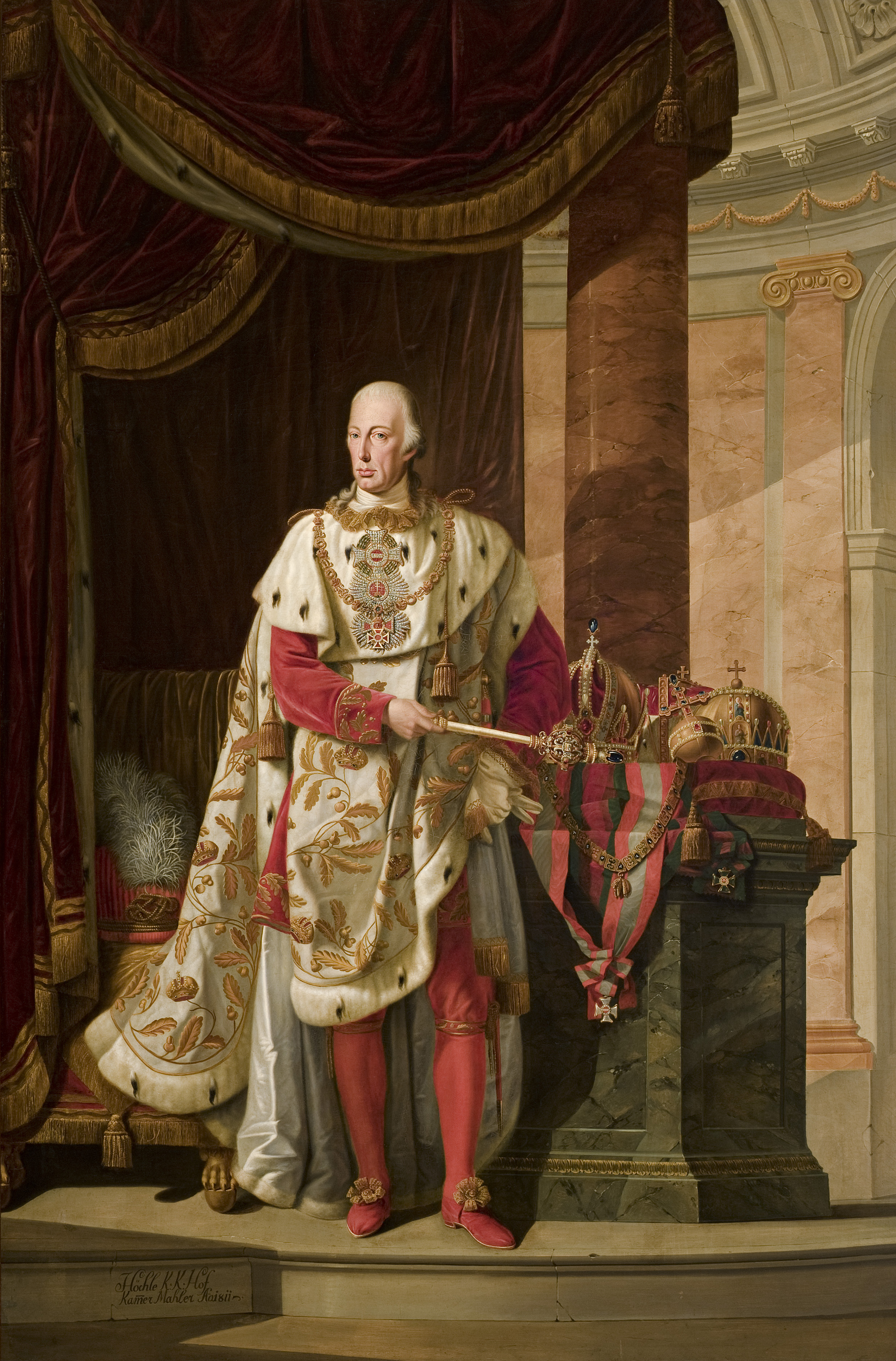
Emperor Francis I wearing the order of Leopold

Both the Grand Cross and the First Class members of the Order wore (on formal occasions) their insignia in the form of a sash with the badge attached to the bow and respectively an eight-pointed and a four-pointed breast star. The Grand Cross was somewhat larger than the First Class, as was the width of the sash. A Commander's badge was worn at the neck, suspended from a 52 mm wide ribbon; a Knight wore his badge on a triangular ribbon on the left breast.

The badge consists of a red-enameled gold cross, with white enamel edging. The obverse of the badge displays the initials FIA in gold on a red enamel background. The mottoes of the Order were INTEGRITATI ET MERITO and OPES REGUM CORDA SUBDITORUM. The ribbon of the Order is red with two narrow white side-stripes. The badge's cross is surmounted by a golden imperial crown.

The Grand Cross could also be awarded with diamonds; from 1808 to 1918, only four people received this honour. The last recipient, Count Ernst von Silva-Tarouca, was awarded the decoration on 11 November 1918, hours before Charles I of Austria withdrew from public affairs. After 1918, the Order was no longer awarded.

Grand Cross				
Grand Cross	Collar	Star	Riband	Alternative Medal
First Class				
First Class	Riband	Star	Alternative Medal	
Commander				
Commander	Cross	Alternative Medal		
Knight				
Knight	Cross			

Variations
Grand Cross				
Grand Cross	Grand Cross Star with war decoration	Alternative Medal	Grand Cross Star with war decoration and swords	Alternative Medal
First Class				
First Class	First Class Star with war decoration	Alternative Medal	First Class Star with war decoration and swords	Alternative Medal
Commander				
Commander	Commander with war decoration	Alternative Medal	Commander with war decoration and swords	Alternative Medal
Knight				
Knight	Knight with war decoration		Knight with war decoration and swords	

== Notable recipients ==
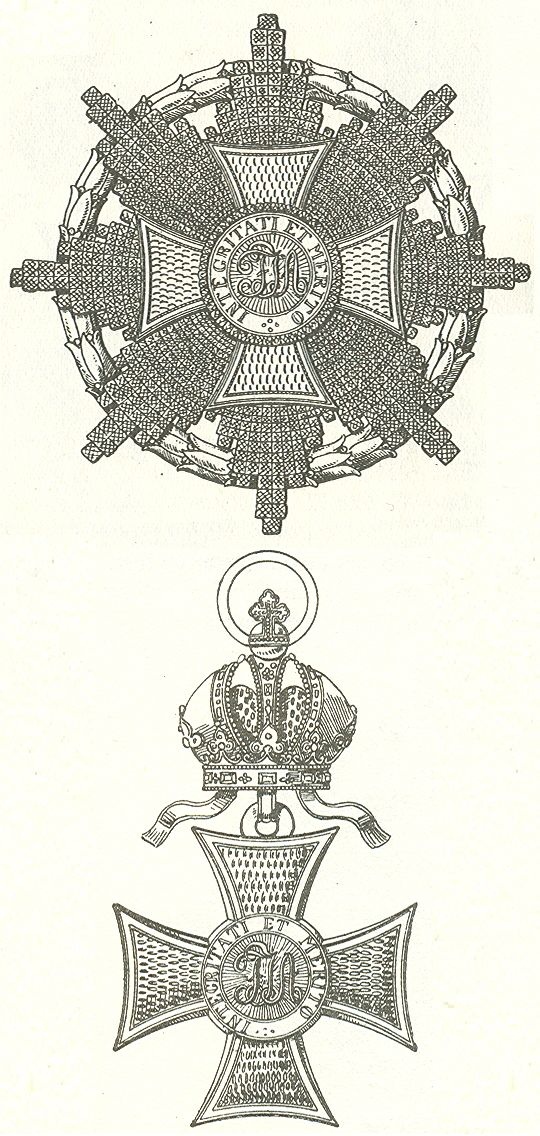
Grand Cross star with war decoration and badge of the order

- Friedrich von Beck-Rzikowsky
- Mihály Esterházy
- Hans Heinrich XV, Prince of Pless
- Karl Samuel Grünhut
- Sergei Witte
- Josef Jungmann
- Korvettenkapitän Georg Ludwig von Trapp. Father of the famous Von Trapp family that inspired the movie The Sound of Music. He was awarded the order for sinking 13 ships as a submarine commander in the Adriatic Sea during World War I.

== See also ==
- Nobility
- Order of chivalry
- Order of St. George (Habsburg-Lorraine)
- Order of the Iron Crown
- Orders, decorations, and medals of Austria-Hungary

== Bibliography ==
- Gustav Adolph Ackermann, Ordensbuch, Sämtlicher in Europa blühender und erloschener Orden und Ehrenzeichen. Annaberg, 1855
- Václav Měřička, Orden und Ehrenzeichen der Österreichisch-Ungarischen Monarchie, Wien 1974
