= László Szalay =

Hungarian statesman and historian (1813–1864)

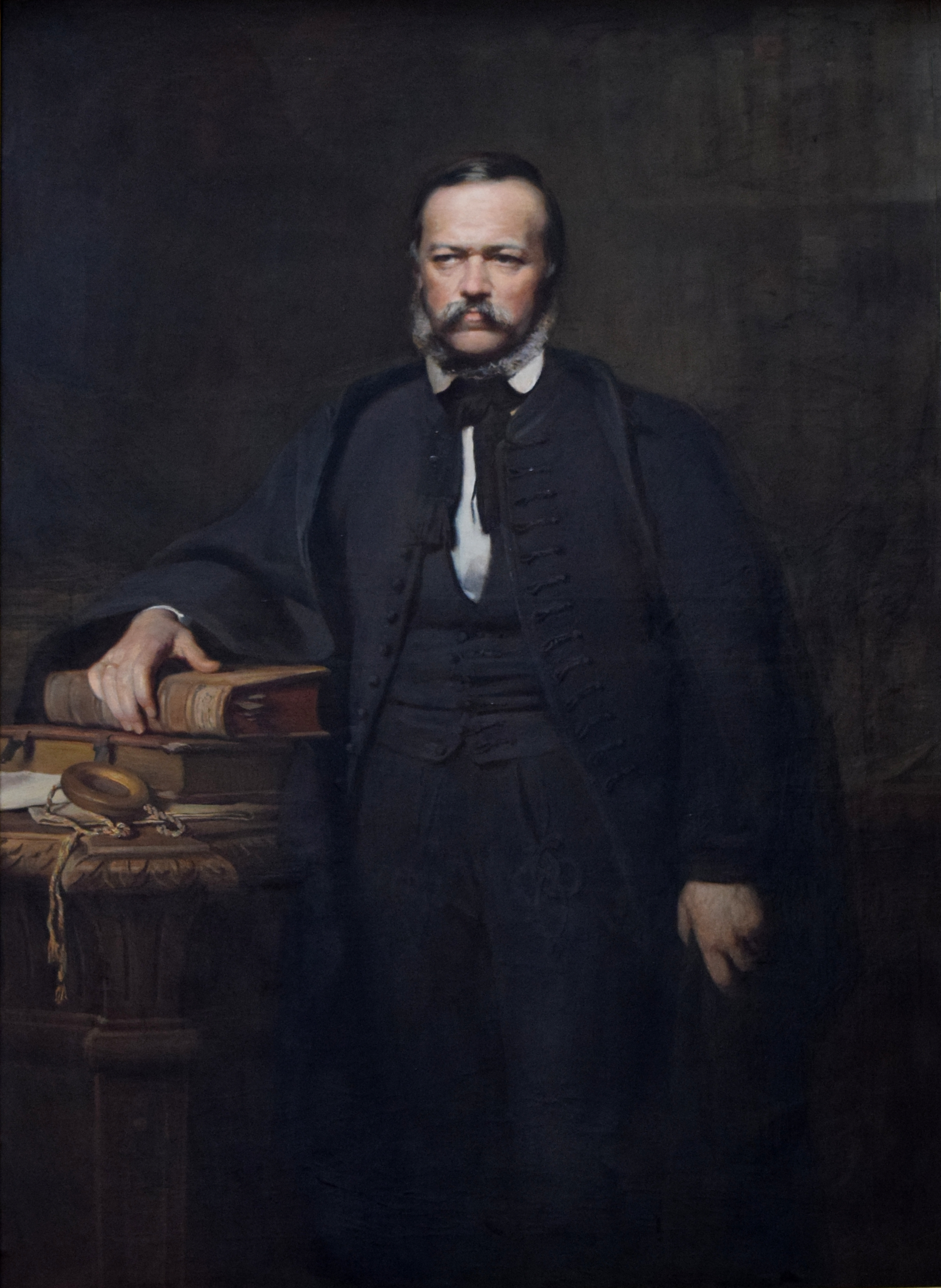
László Szalay, portrait by Bertalan Székely

László Szalay de Kéménd (April 18, 1813 – July 17, 1864) was a Hungarian statesman and historian.

Szalay was born in Buda. After the completion of his studies, he became a member of the Hungarian diet, and in 1848 he represented Hungary in the German national parliament at Frankfurt. He took part in the revolution of 1848–49, and was obliged to seek refuge in Switzerland, where he wrote his history of Hungary. This important work, published at Budapest (1856–1860), extends to 1707. Szalay also wrote remarkable studies on Pitt, Fox, Mirabeau and other statesmen, and contributed very considerably to the codification of Magyar law. In later life he returned to Hungary, but he died at Salzburg on July 17, 1864.
