= László Lukács =

Hungarian politician (1850–1932)

Noble László Lukács de Erzsébetváros
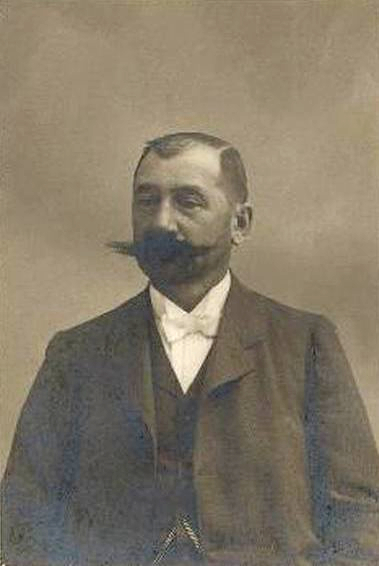

Prime Minister of the Kingdom of Hungary
- In office 22 April 1912 – 10 June 1913
- Monarch: Francis Joseph I
- Preceded by: Károly Khuen-Héderváry
- Succeeded by: István Tisza

Personal details
- Born: 24 November 1850 Zalatna, Kingdom of Hungary (today Zlatna, Romania)
- Died: 23 February 1932 (aged 81) Budapest, Hungary

László Lukács de Erzsébetváros (Hungarian: [ˈlukaːt͡ʃ ˈlaːsloː], 24 November 1850, Zalatna – 23 February 1932) was a Hungarian politician who served as Prime Minister of the Kingdom of Hungary from 1912 to 1913. His father was Dávid Lukács, who was descendant of Armenian immigrants and mine owner.

Political offices
Preceded by Sándor Wekerle	Minister of Finance; 1895–1905	Succeeded by Géza Fejérváry
Preceded by Sándor Wekerle	Minister of Finance; 1910–1912	Succeeded by János Teleszky
Preceded by Károly Khuen-Héderváry	Prime Minister of Hungary; 1912–1913	Succeeded by István Tisza
Preceded by Károly Khuen-Héderváry	Minister of the Interior; 1912–1913	Succeeded by János Sándor
Preceded by Károly Khuen-Héderváry	Minister besides the King; 1912–1913	Succeeded by István Burián
Party political offices
Preceded by New party	Chairman of the National Party of Work; 1910–1918	Succeeded by Party abolished
