= Lajos Pálmai =

Hungarian politician

Minister of Justice of the Counter-Revolutionary Government
- In office 5 May 1919 – 31 May 1919
- Succeeded by: Béla Szászy

Personal details
- Born: 1866 Arad, Austrian Empire
- Died: 1937 (aged 69-70) Budapest, Kingdom of Hungary
- Party: Independent
- Profession: politician

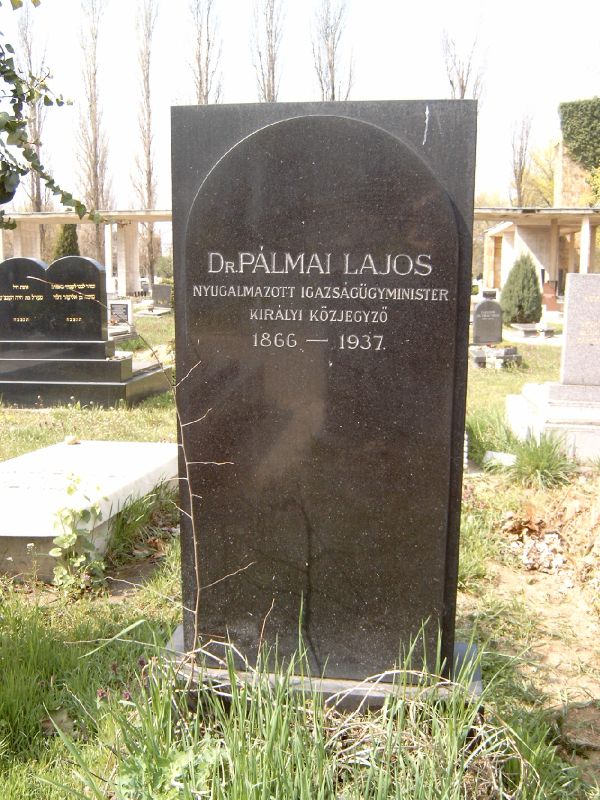
The grave of Lajos Pálmai

Lajos Pálmai (1866–1937) was a Hungarian politician, who served as Minister of Justice in the Counter-revolutionary Government of Arad during the Hungarian Soviet Republic. Later he worked as a notary public for the Diet of Hungary between 1926 and 1936.

Political offices
Preceded by -	Minister of Justice of the Counter-Government; 1919	Succeeded by Béla Szászy
