= Fabinyi =

Fabinyi is a Hungarian surname. Notable people with the surname include:

- Andrew Fabinyi (1908–1978), Hungarian-born Australian publisher
- Martin Fabinyi, Australian film and television producer and director, songwriter and screenwriter
- Tihamér Fabinyi (1890–1953), Hungarian politician

== See also ==
- Teofil Fabiny
