= Gergely Bárándy =

Hungarian lawyer and politician

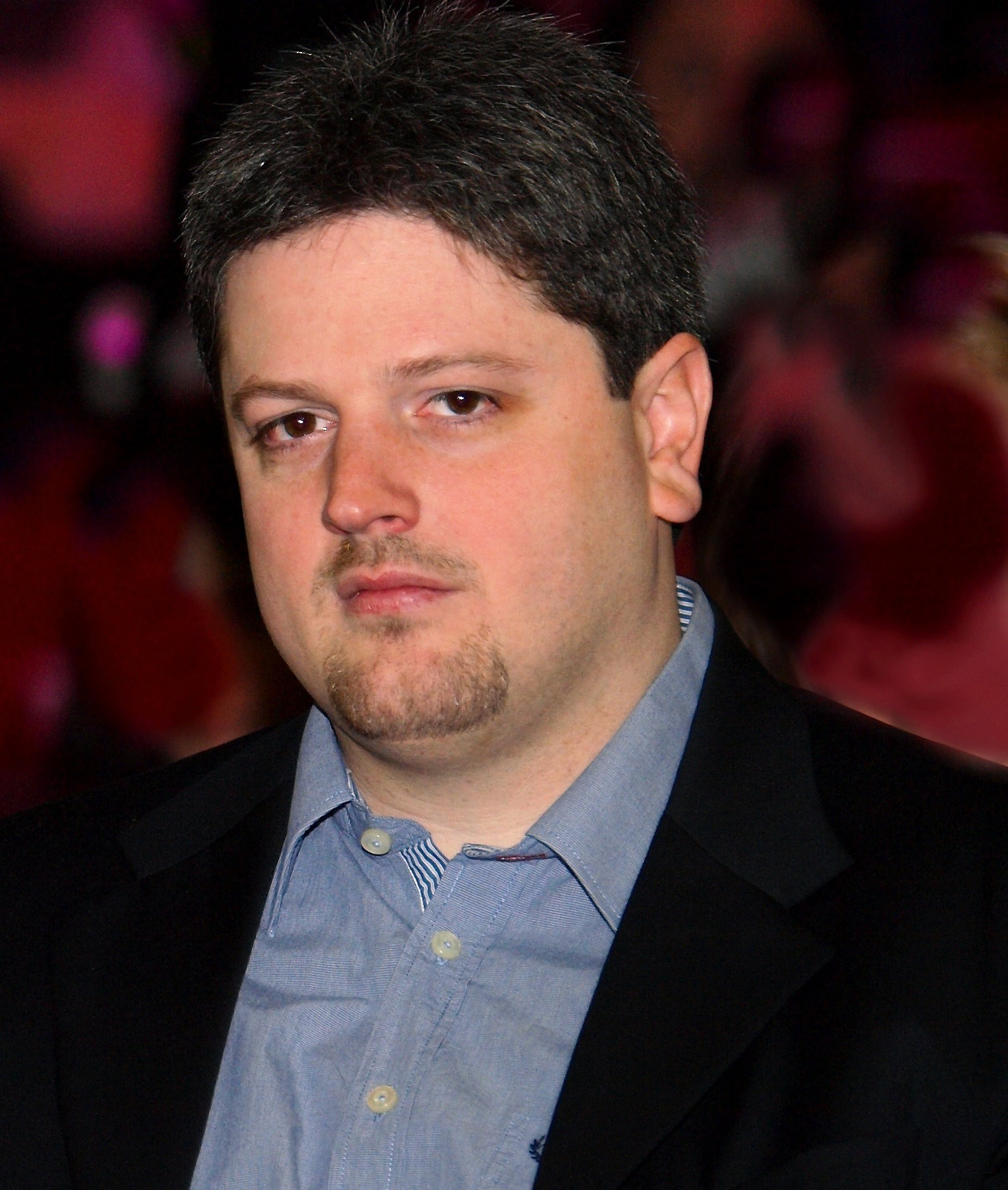

Member of the National Assembly
- In office 16 May 2006 – 7 May 2018

Personal details
- Born: 28 November 1976 (age 49) Budapest, Hungary
- Party: MSZP (since 2003)
- Spouse: Dr. Aliz Bárándy
- Children: Aliz Zsuzsanna
- Parent: Péter Bárándy
- Profession: lawyer, politician

Dr. Gergely Bárándy (born 28 November 1976) is a Hungarian lawyer and politician, member of the National Assembly from 2006 to 2018.

== Biography ==
He was born in Budapest on 28 November 1976 as the son of lawyer Péter Bárándy, who served as Minister of Justice in the Cabinet of Péter Medgyessy. His grandfather was György Bárándy, a famous lawyer in Hungary. Gergely's mother, Zsuzsanna Kecskés is also a lawyer.

He finished József Attila Secondary Grammar School in 1995. He studied at Salzburg Secondary Grammar School from 1993 to 1994. He attended the Faculty of Law of Pázmány Péter Catholic University and in 2000 he received Doctor of Laws title. Between 2000 and 2003 he practised law. After passing the lawyer special examination he has worked as lawyer for the Bárándy & Co. Lawyer's Office from 2003. In the course of his university studies he was demonstrator. After obtaining degree, at first he worked as an assistant, then as assistant lecturer from January 2001, then as senior lecturer from February 2006 for the Department of Criminal Law at the Faculty of Law of Pázmány Péter Catholic University.

Bárándy was in several Hungarian and foreign offices. Between 2001 and 2004 he was secretary of Hungarian Criminology Association, now he is member of board of directors in this association. He was criminal expert in the Committee on Human Rights, Minorities, Civil and Religious Affairs of Parliament. He is president of National Legal and Administrative Branch of Hungarian Socialist Party (MSZP) and he is the Budapest delegate of the National Ethical and Coordinating Committee. He is member of Youth Political Cabinet of the National Board, National Educational and Training Cabinet of MSZP, Public Law Team of MSZP which prepares the elections.

In the 2006 parliamentary election he obtained a mandate from the party's Budapest Regional List. He is a member of the Constitutional, Judicial and Standing Orders Committee since 30 May 2006. He has been a member of National Jurisdiction Council from 17 October 2006. He secured a parliamentary seat from the party's National List during the 2010 parliamentary election. He became a Vice Chairman of the Ad Hoc Committee for Preparation of Constitution in 2010.

He was re-elected MP via his party's national list during the 2014 parliamentary election. He was a member of the Justice Committee and vice-chairman of the Legislative Committee from 2014 to 2018. On 26 January 2018, he announced he will not run as a candidate in the 2018 parliamentary election, referring "the continuation became untenable for me". Resigning from his all party positions, Bárándy retired from politics and returned to his professional career of lawyer and legal historian.

== Personal life ==
He is married. His wife is Dr Aliz Bárándy. They have a daughter Aliz Zsuzsanna.

== Selected publications ==
He published several articles on the subject of criminal law. He has a complex intermediate language exam in English and advanced language exam in German.

- Velence fénykora - a Velencei Köztársaság államberendezkedésének kialakulása és kora (1999)
- A Tenger keresztes lovagjai - Velence részvétele a keresztes hadjáratokban (2004)
- A gyűlöletbeszéd Magyarországon (2009)
