= László Almásy (politician) =

Hungarian jurist, soldier and politician

Count László Almásy
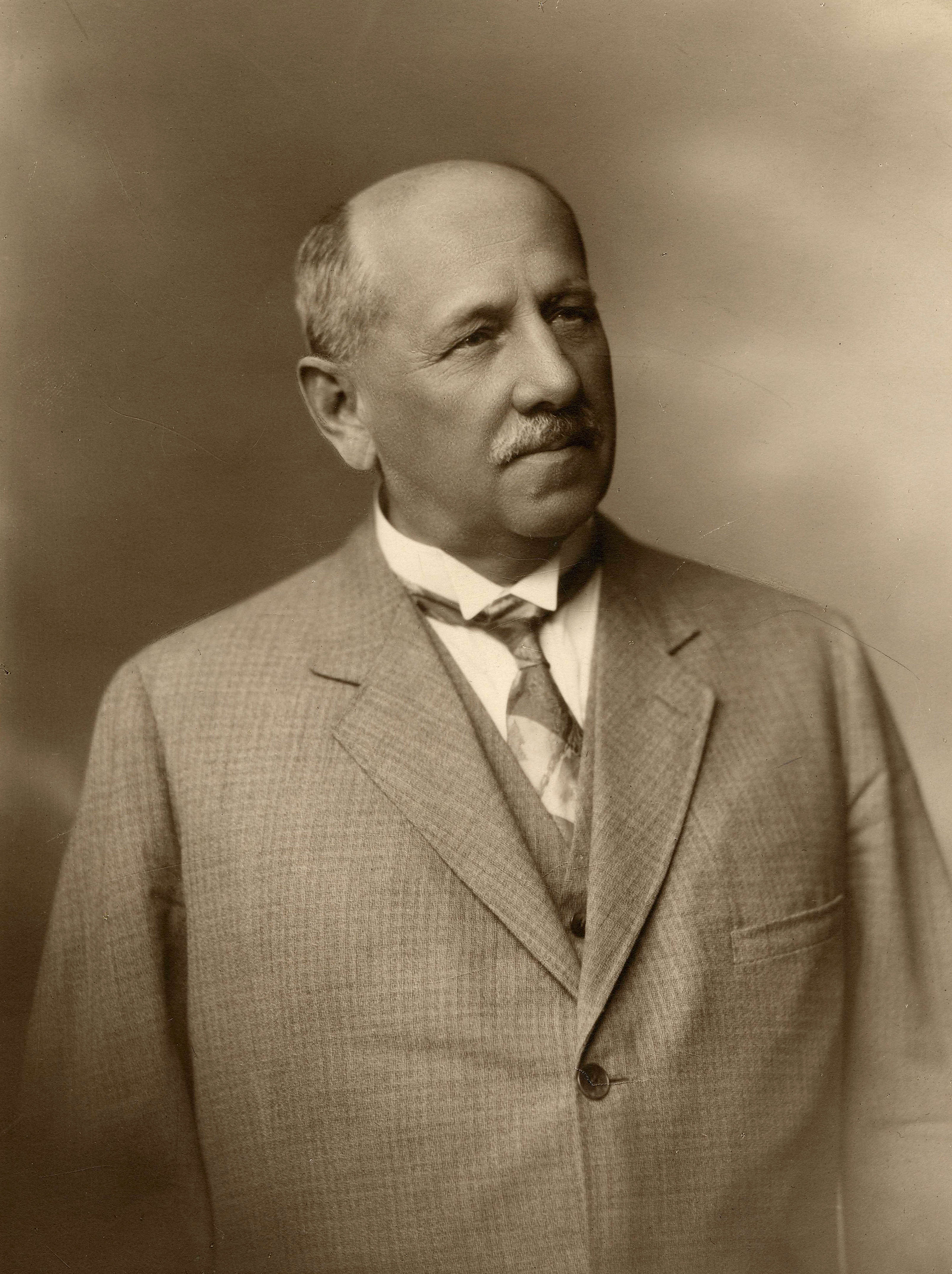

Speaker of the House of Representatives
- In office 7 February 1929 – 29 April 1935
- Preceded by: Tibor Zsitvay
- Succeeded by: Sándor Sztranyavszky

Personal details
- Born: 27 July 1869 Jászberény, Austria-Hungary
- Died: 12 March 1936 (aged 66) Budapest, Hungary
- Party: Liberal Party; Party of National Work; Unity Party; Party of National Unity
- Profession: politician

László Almásy de Zsadány et Törökszentmiklós (27 July 1869 – 12 March 1936) was a Hungarian jurist, soldier and politician, who served as Speaker of the House of Representatives between 1929 and 1935.

== Biography ==
He was born into an ancient Roman Catholic noble family in Jászberény. His brother, Sándor functioned as Lord Lieutenant (Count; comes) of Bihar County then Jász-Nagykun-Szolnok County. László was married.

He studied law and became doctor at the University of Budapest (today: Eötvös Loránd University). After that he spent his voluntary military service in the 10th Hussar Regiment and was promoted to reserve Lieutenant. He became a lawyer in 1892.

Almásy was a supporter of István Tisza and participated in the organization of the Party of National Work after Hungarian Political Crisis of 1905-1906. He became a member of the Diet of Hungary in 1910. He served as a recorder in the House of Representatives from 1913 to 1918. During First World War he served as a Government Commissioner at the Red Cross for a short time. He was awarded with Order of Franz Joseph in 1915. He retired from the politics after the Aster Revolution in 1918. During the time of the Hungarian Soviet Republic, he was held prisoner as a hostage for several weeks.

He returned to the politics and became a member of the National Assembly of Hungary (MP) for Pomáz from the Unity Party in 1922. He was elected to a deputy speaker of the parliament. He resigned from that position when he was appointed deputy chairman of the Unity Party replacing Gyula Gömbös who withdrew from the governing party in 1923. Honouring of his flood protection works, the Almásy Bridge (today: Tildy Bridge), which connected Tahitótfalu to Szentendre was named after him in 1926.

He was inactive because of his disease during 1926 Hungarian parliamentary election therefore his tasks were carried out by his deputy, István Rubinek, brother of Gyula Rubinek. He was elected Member of Parliament for Pomáz again. He served as Chairman of the Unity Party from January 1927 to February 1929. After that he was appointed Speaker of the House of Magnates, when his predecessor, Tibor Zsitvay became Minister of Justice in the cabinet of István Bethlen. He died on 12 March 1936 at the age of 67.

Political offices
Preceded by Tibor Zsitvay	Speaker of the House of Representatives; 1929–1935	Succeeded by Sándor Sztranyavszky
