= Garami =

Garami is a surname. Notable people with the surname include:

- Ernő Garami (1876–1935), Hungarian politician
- József Garami (1939–2025), Hungarian footballer and manager
