= Vladar =

Vladar is a surname. Notable people with the surname include:

- Daniel Vladař (born 1997), Czech ice hockey player
- Gábor Vladár (1881–1972), Hungarian politician and jurist
- Stefan Vladar (born 1965), Austrian pianist and conductor
