= István Ries =

Hungarian politician (1885–1950)

Minister of Justice of Hungary
- In office 21 July 1945 – 17 July 1950
- Preceded by: Ágoston Valentiny
- Succeeded by: Erik Molnár

Personal details
- Born: November 14, 1885 Küngös, Austria-Hungary
- Died: 15 September 1950 (aged 64) Vác, People's Republic of Hungary
- Party: MSZDP, MDP
- Profession: politician, jurist

Dr. István Ries (14 November 1885 – 15 September 1950) was a Hungarian politician and jurist, who served as Minister of Justice between 1945 and 1950, during the transition period to the communism in Hungary.

== Biography ==
=== Early career ===
He was born into a wealthy Jewish family in Küngös, which located in Veszprém County. His father, Bernát was a land tenant and migrated to the Roman Catholic during István's young age. He also received a Catholic upbringing. He started the school in Budapest and took the final exam in Székesfehérvár. He finished his law studies in Budapest. He founded a lawyer office in 1912. He was a member of the Galilei Circle during his high-school years.

During the First World War he was conscripted in 1914 between the firsts. He was captured by the Russians and he experienced the October Revolution as a prisoner of war. He returned to home in June 1918. At the time of the Hungarian Soviet Republic he was a performer for the People's Committee of Education, then participated in the Winter Campaign as a soldier of the Hungarian Red Army. After the fall of the communist rule he emigrated to Vienna. He returned to Hungary in 1921 and worked as a lawyer again. He joined to the Hungarian Social Democratic Party (MSZDP) in 1924. He became a member of the party's leadership in 1933. During his lawyer's activity he protected the persecuted members of the labour movement and published articles for the Népszava and Szocializmus at several times. As a result, his name became well known in the social democratic circles.

He tried to gain a parliamentarian seat on the 1935 and 1939 elections, but he was not successful. After the Nazi occupation of Hungary he moved to illegality.

=== After the Second World War ===
He returned to the politics after the Siege of Budapest. He was elected to a member of the Interim National Assembly of Hungary on 2 April 1945. He was appointed Minister of Justice of the Interim National Government on 21 July 1945. He held the ministerial position until his arrest. During his ministership the suspects of the 1942 raid in Novi Sad were consigned illegally to the authorities of Yugoslavia in 1946, but he did not take part in the working out of the show trials because he was being restored.

He tendered his resignation in 1947 along with other ministers of the MSZDP due to the inner debates. The problems were resolved so he could stay in his position. Though Mátyás Rákosi and Ernő Gerő did not forgive him. From this he was sidelined. Despite this, he became a member of the Central Leadership of the Hungarian Working People's Party (MDP) which created from the merge of the Communist Party of Hungary and the Hungarian Social Democratic Party. As justice minister he had a significant role in the acceptance of the new Constitution of Hungary. The Communist-controlled parliament adopted the constitution as Act XX of 1949. The date of its adoption, 20 August, made a new national holiday that coincided with the traditional holiday of the feast of Saint Stephen. The document has been described as "a slavish imitation of the Soviet-type constitutions, with some variations resulting from the historical and political differences between the Soviet Union and Hungary". (Specifically, it was modelled on the "Joseph Stalin" 1936 Soviet Constitution.) Now, Hungary became a people's republic, which was "the state of the workers and working peasants".

=== Arrest and death ===
As reigning minister he was arrested on 7 July 1950 as based on a frame-up. His office term ended on 17 July formally. The regime wanted to sentence him in the Árpád Szakasits trial but before the case he was killed in the Vác prison by thugs of Gyula Princz. Miklós Bauer, a member of the State Protection Authority also participated in Ries' torture. According to his memorandum he tried to increase the politician's humiliation before the interrogation with "scolding, spitting and some slaps".

Ries was rehabilitated in 1956 during the De-Stalinization.

=== Sport diplomacy ===
Beside the political functions Ries also served in several sport offices. He was a member of the Highest Five Sport Council and from 1947 served as chairman of the Sport High Council and of the Friendship Sport Centrum. Between 1947 and 1950 he was the President of the Hungarian Football Federation and of the Board of the Hungarian Referees.

== See also ==
- László Rajk
- József Mindszenty

Political offices
Preceded by Ágoston Valentiny	Minister of Justice; 1945–1950	Succeeded by Erik Molnár
Sporting positions
Preceded by József Becskó	President of the Hungarian Football Federation; 1947–1950	Succeeded by Sándor Barcs
