= Kálmán Kulcsár =

Hungarian politician (1928–2010)

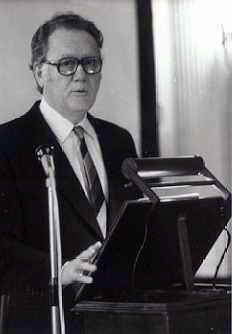

Minister of Justice of Hungary
- In office 29 June 1988 – 23 May 1990
- Preceded by: Imre Markója
- Succeeded by: István Balsai

Personal details
- Born: 27 June 1928 Erdőtelek, Kingdom of Hungary
- Died: 4 September 2010 (aged 82) Budapest, Hungary
- Party: MSZMP
- Profession: politician, jurist

Kálmán Kulcsár (27 June 1928 – 4 September 2010) was a Hungarian politician and jurist, who served as Minister of Justice between 1988 and 1990. He was the father of the sociology of law in Hungary. He served as the last chairman of the Patriotic People's Front until 1990 and after that as Hungarian ambassador to Canada.

== Publications ==
- A szociológiai gondolkodás fejlődése (1966, 1972)
- A jogszociológia alapjai (1976)
- Rechtssoziologische Abhandlungen (1980)
- Gazdaság, társadalom, jog (1982)
- Contemporary Hungarian Society (1984)
- A modernizáció és a magyar társadalom (1986)
- Politika és jogszociológia (1987)
- Modernizáció és jog (1989, angolul 1992)
- Political Culture – Legal Culture (1991)
- Két világ között 1988–1990 (1994)
- A jog szerepe a társadalmi változásokban – a jog változása (1995)
- A politikai rendszer és a magyar valóság (1997)
- A politikatudomány arcai (co-author, 1999)
- Globális és regionális integráció politikai hatása (2004)
- Az új politikai rendszer és a magyar valóság (2006, in English too)
- Kína a világpolitikában. Az átalakuló Kína (2007)
- India, az útkereső birodalom (2008)

Political offices
Preceded by Imre Markója	Minister of Justice; 1988–1990	Succeeded by István Balsai
