= Royal Curia of Hungary =

Supreme court of Hungary between 1723 and 1949

- Magyar Királyi Kúria
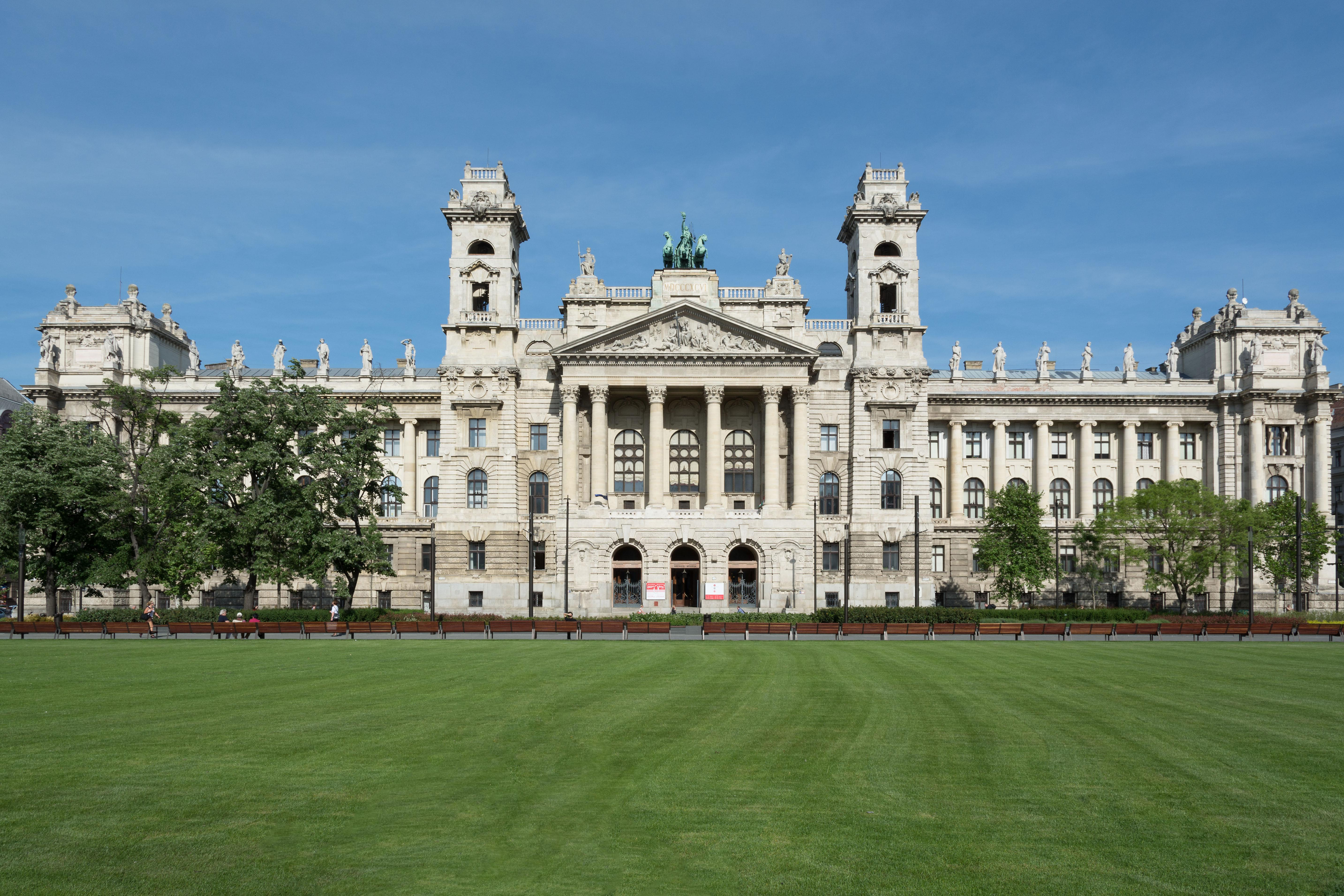
- Interactive map of Royal Curia of Hungary
- 47°30′28.13″N 19°2′54.31″E
- Established: 1723; 303 years ago
- Dissolved: 1949; 77 years ago
- Jurisdiction: Hungary
- Location: Budapest
- Coordinates: 47°30′28.13″N 19°2′54.31″E

The Royal Curia of Hungary (Hungarian: Magyar Királyi Kúria, Latin: Curia Regia) was the supreme court of the Kingdom of Hungary (Hungary and Croatia) between 1723 and 1949.

Charles VI in 1723 divided it into two courts: the Tabula Septemviralis (Court of the Seven) and the Tabula Regia Iudiciaria (Royal Court). The Tabula Regia functioned under a dignitary named the Personalis, in the case of prevention, of the elder Baron Court.

== Tabula Septemviralis ==
The Palatine, five Prelates (the archbishop of Esztergom and Kalocsa and three bishops), eight magnates and eight nobleman, one Reporter of the mine courts and a recorder composed the Tabula Septemviralis, after 1723.

The Tabula Septemviralis solved the appeals on the verdicts of the Tabula Regia and Tabula Banalis. It was the final instance, and in civil cases it was not possible to appeal its verdict, while in criminal cases, the King had the power to grant amnesty or pardon.

== Tabula Regia Iudiciaria ==
The Tabula Regia was composed of two prelates, two Barons of the Court, two deputy judge advocates of the Kingdom: the vice Palatine, the deputy judge advocate of the Curia Regia, four protonotaries, four assessors of the Kingdom, four assessors of the archdiocese, four adjunctive assessors.

== Presidents (1860–1949) ==
- György Apponyi (1860–1863)
- György Andrássy (1863–1865)
- vacant (1865–1867)
- György Majláth (1867–1883)
- Béla Perczel (1884–1888)
- Miklós Szabó (1888–1906)
- Adolf Oberschall (1906–1908)
- Antal Günther (1909–1920)
- Gusztáv Tőry (1920–1925)
- Andor Juhász (1925–1934)
- István Osvald (1934–1937)
- Géza Töreky (1937–1944)
- Jenő Szemák (1944–1945)
- István Kerekess (1945–1949)
- Ödön Somogyi (1949–1950)

== See also ==
- Curia of Hungary
