= Ödön Mikecz =

Hungarian politician, jurist (1894–1965)

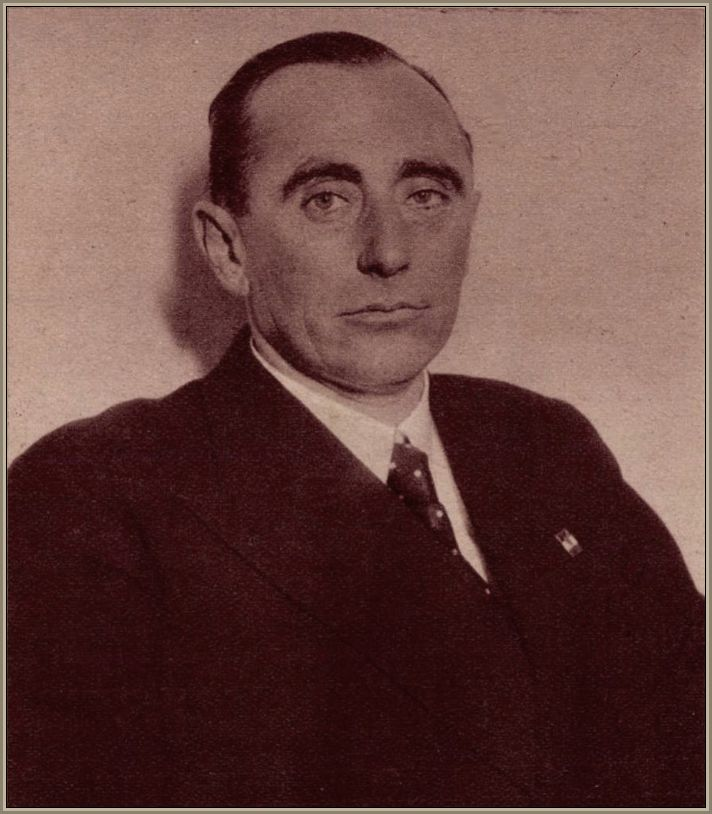

Minister of Justice of Hungary
- In office 9 March 1938 – 15 November 1938
- Preceded by: Andor Lázár
- Succeeded by: András Tasnádi Nagy

Personal details
- Born: May 27, 1894 Budapest, Austria-Hungary
- Died: 21 January 1965 (aged 70) Budapest, People's Republic of Hungary
- Party: Party of National Unity
- Profession: politician, jurist

Ödön Mikecz (27 May 1894 - 21 January 1965) was a Hungarian politician and jurist, who served as Minister of Justice in 1938. He finished his law studies at the University of Budapest and in Zürich. He worked as a lawyer in Nyíregyháza from 1923. In 1935 he served as press chief of Prime Minister Gyula Gömbös, in the next year as State Secretary of the Interior. Kálmán Darányi appointed justice minister on 9 March 1938. After that he left the party. He became a member of the House of Magnates in 1940. During the cabinets of Döme Sztójay and Géza Lakatos he criticized the Nazis' steps.

Political offices
Preceded by Andor Lázár	Minister of Justice; 1938	Succeeded by András Tasnádi Nagy
