= Dezső Szilágyi =

Hungarian politician and jurist

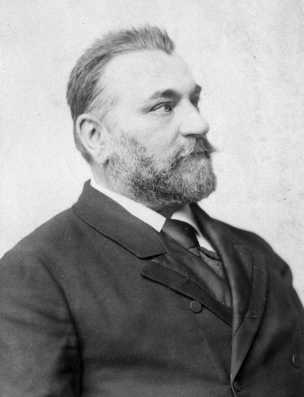

Minister of Justice of Hungary
- In office 9 April 1889 – 15 January 1895
- Preceded by: Teofil Fabiny
- Succeeded by: Sándor Erdély

Personal details
- Born: 1 April 1840; Nagyvárad, Kingdom of Hungary
- Died: 30 July 1901 (aged 61); Budapest, Austria-Hungary
- Political party: Deák Party, Moderate Opposition, Liberal Party
- Profession: politician, jurist

Dezső Szilágyi (1 April 1840 – 30 July 1901) was a Hungarian politician and jurist, who served as Minister of Justice between 1889 and 1895.

== Biography ==
Szilágyi was born at Nagyvárad (today: Oradea, Romania) in the Kingdom of Hungary. He studied law at Budapest, Vienna, and in Germany, and early attracted attention with his articles on law and politics. As head of a section in the Ministry of Justice of Hungary, he traveled on a commission from his government to England to study there the conditions of the administration of justice, of which he had a knowledge then equaled by few. Brought up wholly in Liberal ideas, Szilágyi took a conspicuous part in the codification work of the Ministry of Justice.

Deputy in 1871, professor of public law and politics at Budapest University in 1874, he was in 1877 one of the leaders of the opposition, which, however, he left in 1886. In 1887 he was returned to parliament by Pozsony (Pressburg) as an independent member.

He became Minister of Justice in 1889. From this time to 1894, he directed his efforts principally towards a radical reform of the whole administration of the courts. In 1894 he took a conspicuous part in ecclesiastical legislation, with which his name is permanently connected. Article XXXI of the Law of Civil Marriage, and articles XXXII and XXXIII on the religion of the children and on state registration, were the result of his active cooperation.

After the appointment of Dezső Bánffy, the former president of the Hungarian House of Deputies, as prime minister, Szilágyi was elected president of the House on 21 January 1895, which office he retained until 1899.

== Notes ==
Political offices
Preceded by Teofil Fabiny	Minister of Justice; 1889–1895	Succeeded by Sándor Erdély
Preceded by Dezső Bánffy	Speaker of the House of Representatives; 1895–1898	Succeeded by József Madarász
