= Andor Lázár =

Hungarian politician (1882–1971)

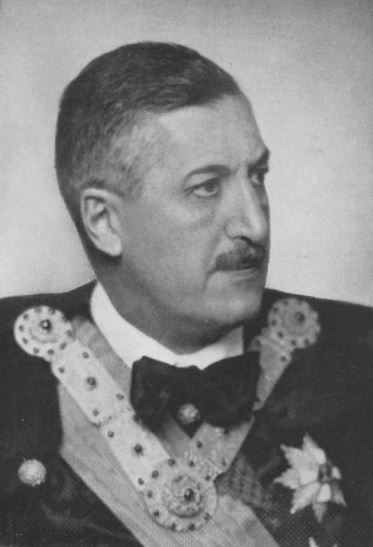

Minister of Justice of Hungary
- In office 1 October 1932 – 9 March 1938
- Preceded by: Tibor Zsitvay
- Succeeded by: Ödön Mikecz

Personal details
- Born: March 8, 1882 Pápa, Austria-Hungary
- Died: 12 June 1971 (aged 89) Leányfalu, People's Republic of Hungary
- Party: Unity Party, Party of National Unity, Party of Hungarian Life
- Profession: politician, jurist

Andor Lázár (8 March 1882 – 12 June 1971) was a Hungarian politician and jurist, who served as Minister of Justice between 1932 and 1938.

He was born into a Hungarian Calvinist family of noble origin in Pápa. He learnt at the Calvinist College of Pápa and finished law studies in Budapest. During his field trips he visited most of the countries of Europe, but he also went to Canada and the United States. From 1906 he flourished as practitioner and soon he became one of the most considerable and noted lawyers in the capital city. He hulled valuable literature works under his economic studies. His acknowledged writings are the Economic-political studies, the Economy of Austria in the beginnings of the 19th century, The Austrian devaluation and the German and Polish devaluation.

Lázár had a significant role in the foundation of the Hungarian State Banknote Press and creating of the Defence League of the Hungarian Territorial Integrity. His political career was started in the early 1930s, he was a supporter of Gyula Gömbös. He served as state secretary of the Ministry of Defence in 1931. He represented the city of Debrecen from 1931 until 1939 as a member of the governing party (Unity Party then Party of National Unity). When Gömbös was appointed Prime Minister Lázár became Minister of Justice. Instead of the prime Minister's views he supported the conservative forces, as a result he could hold the ministerial position in the next cabinet, which was led by Kálmán Darányi. later he had conflicts with the radicalising Béla Imrédy so he retired from the politics. he continued his lawyer career.

After the Second World War he could not start a political career again. He was interrogated about the Rákosi trial (during his ministership Mátyás Rákosi was arrested and sentenced to imprisonment). Although it turned out that Lázár had no role in this case, in spite of this he was interned to the Great Hungarian Plain in 1951. From 1953 he lived in Leányfalu.

Political offices
Preceded by Tibor Zsitvay	Minister of Justice; 1932–1938	Succeeded by Ödön Mikecz
