= Jenő Szinyei Merse =

Hungarian politician

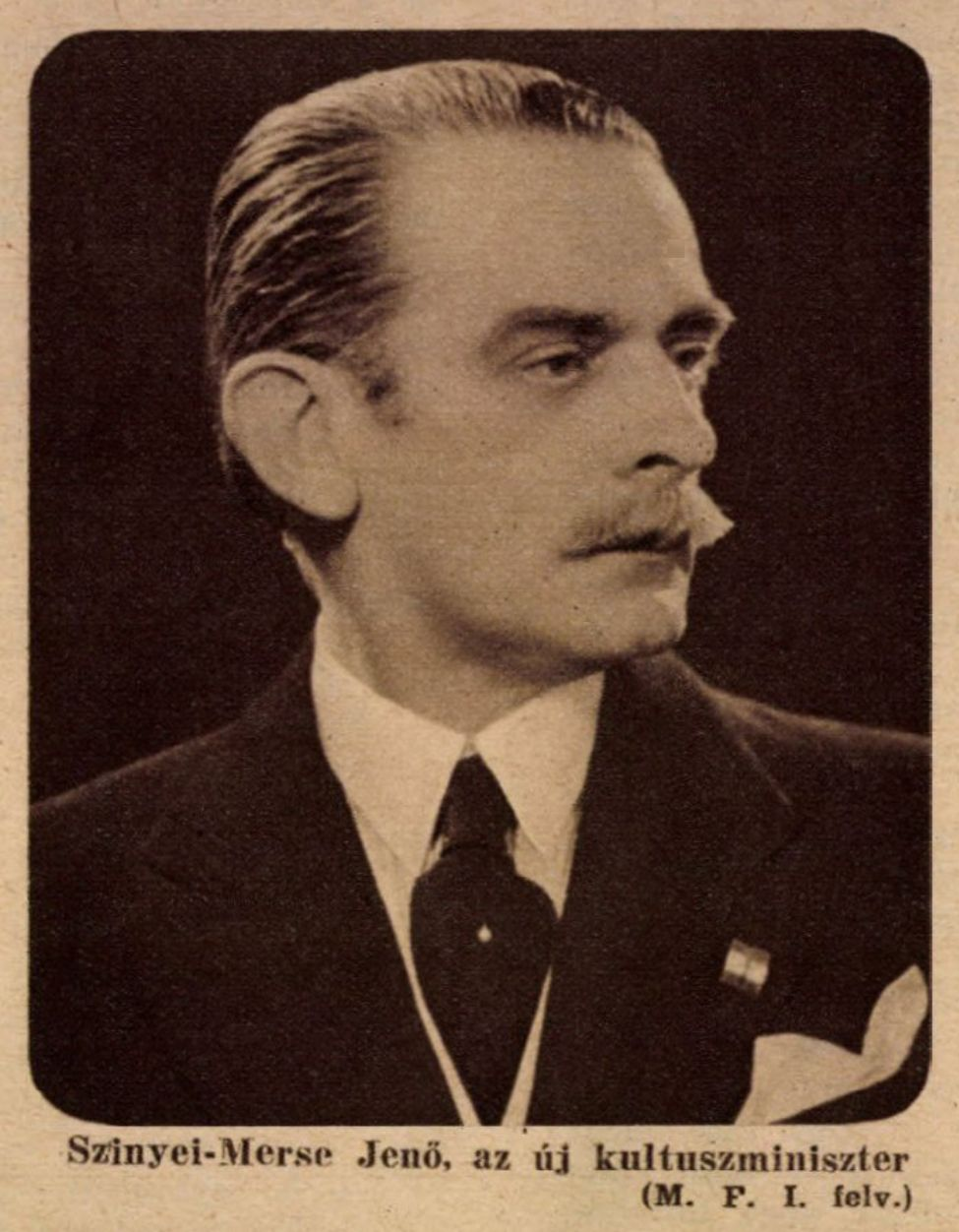

Minister of Religion and Education of Hungary
- In office 3 July 1942 – 22 March 1944
- Prime Minister: Miklós Kállay
- Preceded by: Bálint Hóman
- Succeeded by: István Antal

Personal details
- Born: 7 December 1888 Budapest, Austria-Hungary
- Died: 8 September 1957 (aged 68) Budapest, People's Republic of Hungary
- Party: Unity Party, Party of National Unity, Party of Hungarian Life
- Profession: politician

Jenő Szinyei Merse (7 December 1888 – 8 September 1957) was a Hungarian politician, who served as Minister of Religion and Education between 1942 and 1944. He was one of the deputy speakers of the House of Representatives of Hungary from 1938.

Political offices
Preceded by Bálint Hóman	Minister of Religion and Education; 1942–1944	Succeeded by István Antal
