= Tibor Zsitvay =

Hungarian politician and jurist

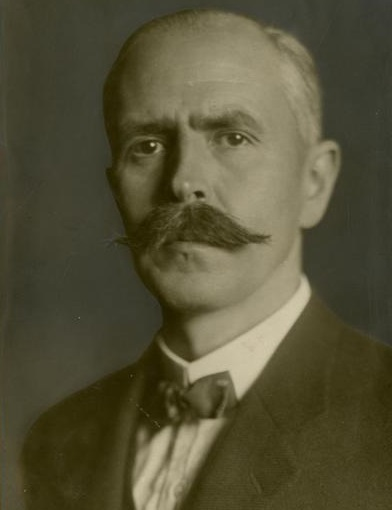

Minister of Justice of Hungary
- In office 4 February 1929 – 1 October 1932
- Preceded by: István Bethlen
- Succeeded by: Andor Lázár

Personal details
- Born: 10 November 1884 Pozsony, Austria-Hungary
- Died: 9 July 1969 (aged 84) Alpnach, Switzerland
- Party: Christian National Party, Unity Party, Party of National Unity
- Spouse: Margit Feichtinger
- Children: Katalin; Leó; Margit
- Profession: politician, jurist

Tibor Zsitvay de Zsitvatő (10 November 1884 – 9 July 1969) was a Hungarian politician and jurist, who served as Minister of Justice between 1929 and 1932. He finished law studies at the University of Budapest. He was the counsel of the Hungarian Railways from 1909 to 1919. After the fall of the Hungarian Soviet Republic he was one of the founders of the Christian National Party. He was delegated to the position of commissioner of Kecskemét between 1919 and 1920. He left his party in 1920 and became lawyer again.

He worked as the attorney general of the MÁV in 1920–26. He became a member of the Diet of Hungary in 1922 and served as Deputy Speaker in 1924. He served as Speaker of the National Assembly of Hungary between 1926 and 1929. After that he was appointed Minister of Justice by István Bethlen. Zsitvay held the position in the cabinet of Gyula Károlyi too. During his ministership, the two communist leaders, Sándor Fürst and Imre Sallai were executed. He represented Kecskemét from 1931. He was the leader of the Party of National Unity in Budapest during this time. He left the governing party in 1938. He emigrated to Switzerland in 1944.

Political offices
Preceded by Béla Scitovszky	Speaker of the National Assembly; 1926–1927	Succeeded by Gyula Wlassics; House of Magnates
Preceded by Béla Scitovszky	Speaker of the National Assembly; 1926–1927	Succeeded by himself House of Representatives
Preceded by office created	Speaker of the House of Representatives; 1927–1929	Succeeded by László Almásy
Preceded by István Bethlen	Minister of Justice; 1929–1932	Succeeded by Andor Lázár
