= Zoltán Rónai =

Hungarian politician (1880–1940)

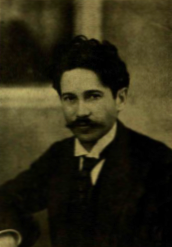

People's Commissar of Justice of Hungary
- In office 24 June 1919 – 1 August 1919
- Preceded by: István Ládai
- Succeeded by: Ernő Garami

Personal details
- Born: 16 August 1880 Budapest, Austria-Hungary
- Died: 17 May 1940 (aged 59) Brussels, Belgium
- Party: MSZDP
- Spouse: Flóra Peisner
- Parent(s): Bernát Rosenthal; Ilona Klein
- Profession: politician, jurist, journalist

Zoltán Rónai (born as Zoltán Rosenthal; 16 August 1880 – 17 May 1940) was a Hungarian politician and jurist of Jewish descent, who served as People's Commissar of Justice in 1919 during the Hungarian Soviet Republic. During his time as Commissar, he helped draft the first charter-like constitution in June. Before the First World War he worked as a journalist of the Népszava and of the Szocializmus. He was a supporter of the centrist Zsigmond Kunfi. After the fall of the communist regime he emigrated to Vienna to joining to the Two and Half Internationale. Then he lived in Austria, France and finally Belgium. He published articles for the Szocializmus, using the pseudonym of Zoltán Vándor. After the Nazi invasion of Belgium he committed suicide.

Political offices
| Preceded by István Ládai | People's Commissar of Justice; 1919 | Succeeded by Ernő Garami |
