= István Ládai =

Hungarian politician and jurist

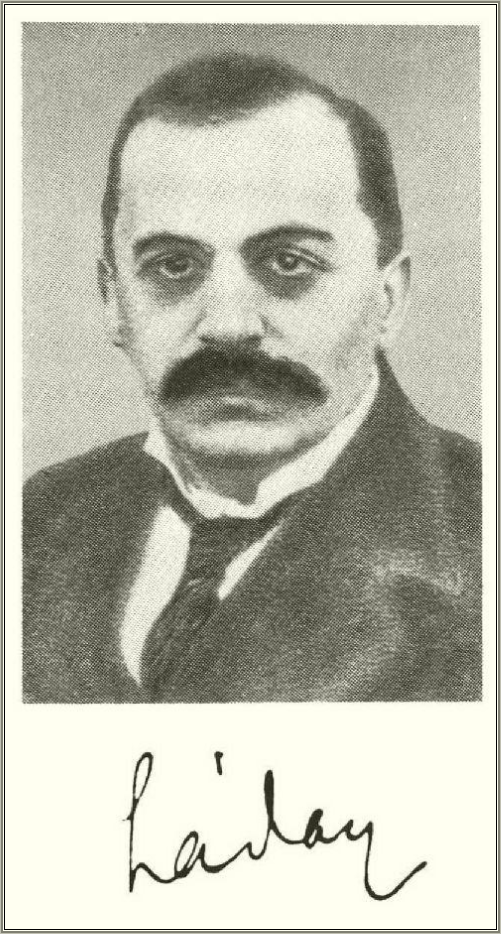

People's Commissar of Justice of Hungary
- In office 21 March 1919 – 24 June 1919
- Preceded by: Sándor Juhász Nagy
- Succeeded by: Zoltán Rónai

Personal details
- Born: May 14, 1873; Kecskemét, Austria-Hungary
- Died: 1920s Bucharest, Kingdom of Romania
- Profession: politician, jurist

István Ládai (Láday; 14 May 1873 – 15 April 1936) was a Hungarian politician and jurist, who served as People's Commissar of Justice in 1919 during the Hungarian Soviet Republic.

Political offices
| Preceded by Sándor Juhász Nagy | People's Commissar of Justice; 1919 | Succeeded by Zoltán Rónai |
