= Béla Zoltán =

Hungarian politician and jurist

Minister of Justice of Hungary
- In office 22 September 1919 – 24 November 1919
- Preceded by: György Baloghy
- Succeeded by: István Bárczy

Personal details
- Born: 31 January 1865; Pest, Kingdom of Hungary
- Died: 30 October 1929 (aged 64); Budapest, Kingdom of Hungary
- Political party: Independent
- Profession: politician, jurist

Béla Zoltán (31 January 1865 – 30 October 1929) was a Hungarian politician and jurist, who served as Minister of Justice in 1919. He was a member of the House of Magnates from 1927.

Political offices
Preceded by György Baloghy	Minister of Justice; 1919	Succeeded by István Bárczy
