= Albert Takács =

Hungarian politician and jurist

Minister of Justice and Law Enforcement of Hungary
- In office 31 May 2007 – 17 February 2008
- Preceded by: József Petrétei
- Succeeded by: Tibor Draskovics

Personal details
- Born: 17 March 1955 (age 70); Kecskemét, People's Republic of Hungary
- Political party: Independent
- Profession: politician, jurist

Albert Takács (born 17 March 1955) is a Hungarian politician and jurist, who served as Minister of Justice and Law Enforcement between 2007 and 2008.

Political offices
Preceded by József Petrétei	Minister of Justice and Law Enforcement; 2007–2008	Succeeded by Tibor Draskovics
