= Jenő Szemák =

Hungarian jurist

Jenő Szemák (4 February 1887 – 30 July 1971) was a Hungarian jurist, who served as President of the Curia Regia from 1944 to 1945.

He finished his legal studies in Kolozsvár (today: Cluj-Napoca, Romania). He taught at the Calvinist Law Academy of Máramarossziget (today: Sighetu Marmației, Romania) until the Treaty of Trianon (1920) when he was banned from Transylvania. He moved to Budapest.

He was elected President of the Criminal Court in 1939. He led the trials in the cases of many Communist persons including Zoltán Szántó and Mátyás Rákosi. Szemák sympathized with the far-right movements. After the fascist Arrow Cross Party's coup, he was appointed President of the Curia Regia in 1944. He escaped from Hungary after the Second World War. He was sentenced to death in absentia. He settled down in the United States where he died in 1971.

== Sources ==
- Hungarian Biographical Lexicon (in Hungarian)

Legal offices
Preceded by Géza Töreky	President of the Curia Regia; 1944–1945	Succeeded by István Kerekess
