= Antal Günther =

Hungarian politician and journalist

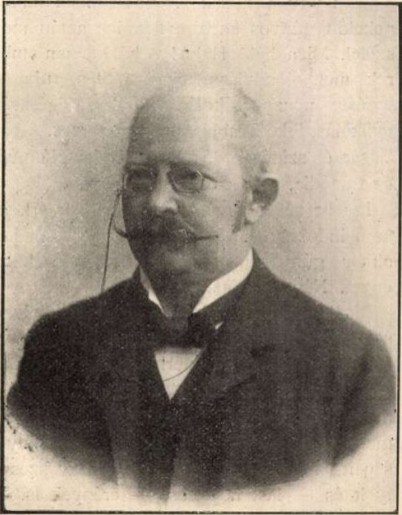

Minister of Justice of Hungary
- In office 2 February 1907 – 23 September 1909
- Preceded by: Géza Polónyi
- Succeeded by: Sándor Wekerle

Personal details
- Born: September 23, 1847; Székesfehérvár, Kingdom of Hungary
- Died: 23 February 1920 (aged 72); Budapest, Hungary
- Political party: Independence Party
- Profession: politician, journalist

Antal Günther (23 September 1847 – 23 February 1920) was a Hungarian politician and journalist, who served as Minister of Justice between 1907 and 1909. He was the President of the Curia Regia from 1909 to 1920. He also served as a Deputy Speaker of the House of Magnates between 1917 and 1918.

Political offices
Preceded by Géza Polónyi	Minister of Justice; 1907–1909	Succeeded by Sándor Wekerle
Legal offices
Preceded by Adolf Oberschall	President of the Curia Regia; 1909–1920	Succeeded by Gusztáv Tőry
