= László Radocsay =

Hungarian politician and jurist

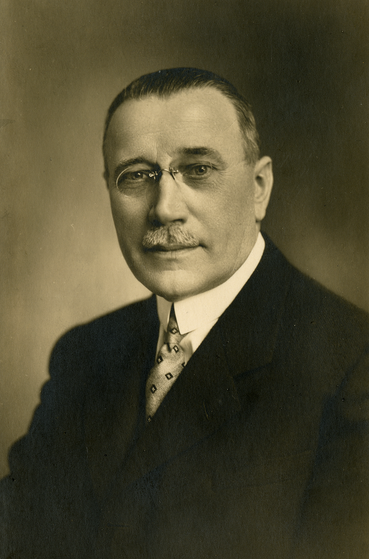

Minister of Justice of Hungary
- In office 9 November 1939 – 22 March 1944
- Preceded by: András Tasnádi Nagy
- Succeeded by: István Antal

Personal details
- Born: 18 November 1878 Istvánfölde, Austria-Hungary
- Died: 14 November 1968 (aged 89) Budapest, People's Republic of Hungary
- Party: Party of Hungarian Life
- Profession: politician, jurist

László Radocsay (18 November 1878 - 14 November 1968) was a Hungarian politician and jurist, who served as Minister of Justice between 1939 and 1944.

Political offices
Preceded by András Tasnádi Nagy	Minister of Justice; 1939–1944	Succeeded by István Antal
