= Border Guard of Hungary =

Border Guard of Hungary Határőrség Magyarországon
- Border Guard emblem

Agency overview
- Formed: 1946
- Dissolved: 2007

Jurisdictional structure
- Operations jurisdiction: Hungary
- Governing body: Ministry of Interior
- General nature: Civilian police

Operational structure
- Headquarters: Budapest

The Border Guard of Hungary (Hungarian: Határőrség Magyarországon) was the border guard of Hungary. Until 2006, it was under the then existing Ministry of the Interior, and from 2006 until its liquidation, it was subordinated to the Ministry of Justice and Law Enforcement, together with the police and the Penitentiary Service. Its main task was to control borders and detect crimes related to border crossing. Although its law enforcement nature has been strengthened in recent years and it is essentially a law enforcement agency, its dual legal status has been retained, meaning that in the event of war, some of its units, the so-called border patrol squadrons, are incorporated into the Hungarian Defence Forces under the constitution, and their control is taken over by the Ministry of Defence.

== History ==
=== Interbellum ===
Hungary's border guarding between the two world wars was influenced by the possibilities set by the Treaty of Trianon. The Hungarian government received permission to establish the Royal Hungarian Customs Guard to guard the borders. The Customs Guard was a disguised part of the Hungarian Armed Forces, operating as a military organization, guarding the state border, ensuring border protection and control of local border traffic, and also performing customs duties. This organization was reorganized into the Royal Hungarian Border Guard in 1932, and then in 1938 it was merged into the Hungarian Army under the name of Border Patrol.

=== Communist period ===
Emblem of the Border Guard in the from 1951 to 1989

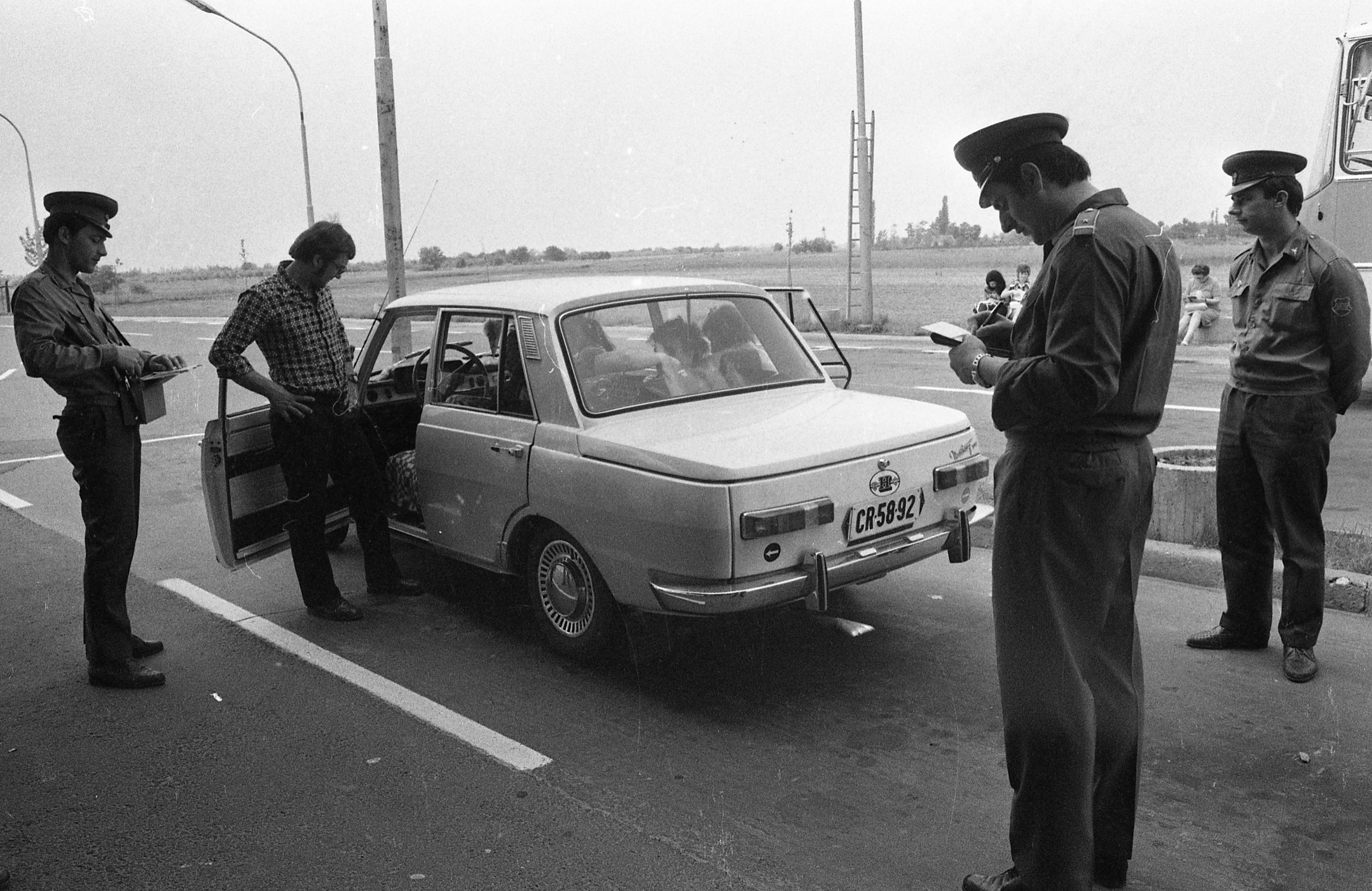
Border post in 1973

After World War II, the state border and border traffic were guarded by the Honvéd Border Guard and the Border Police, which operated as a separate service branch within the Hungarian Police. The Commander of the Border Guard was Mihály Szalvai from February 16, 1948, to December 31, 1949. The next day, on January 1, 1950, the Border Guard was merged into the State Protection Authority.

This period saw the establishment of a total border guard system on the southern and western border sections. In 1950, a 15 km border zone was established on the southern and western border sections, and within this, 500 and 50-meter border strips were established, which could only be entered with a police or border guard permit. Only border guards could enter the 50-meter border strip.

On the western border section, a technical barrier made of barbed wire with a square mesh system was built along the border line. In the south and west, an infantry minefield was built along the state border for a length of 318 km. The minefields were eliminated in 1956 and were cleared, but in 1957 they were re-deployed on the western border section. The southern border zone was finally eliminated in 1965, and the western one in 1969. The complete clearing of the minefield was completed in 1971, and instead, a low-current, SZ-100 type electrical signaling system used in the Soviet Union at that time was built for a length of 248 km.

=== End of communism ===
From 1989, historical changes began in the history of the Border Guard. The border fence was removed from the western and southern border sections, and the electric signalling system on the Austrian border was dismantled.

In 1989, Hungary joined the 1951 Geneva Convention. As a result of the Hungarian changes, many East German citizens came to Hungary, hoping to continue to West Germany. Based on the decision of the Government of Hungary, the Border Guard opened the border crossings on the western border section to them after the Pan-European Picnic on September 11, 1989. As a result of the decision, tens of thousands of East Germann citizens had migrated to the western part of Germany via Hungary by November 9, the day the Berlin Wall was demolished.

In 1990, following the End of communism in Hungary the establishment of professional border guards began, and with it the radical transformation of the Border Guard organization. The ten Border Guard Directorates, the regional management body of the Border Guard, were organized, and border guard secondary schools were established to prepare the large number of professional border guards recruited. On November 15, 1991, the so-called action squadrons were established under the subordination of three directorates (Nagykanizsa, Pécs, Kiskunhalas), which were later established at all directorates and operated as border patrol squadrons until the abolition of the Border Guard. In April 1998, the last conscripts were discharged from the Border Guard. The scope of the Border Guard expanded and laws regulating border guarding were continuously enacted. The legal background regulating the activities of the Border Guard was finally completed with Act No. XXXII of 1997 on Border Guarding and the Border Guard.

Thanks to the so-called in-depth control system, the Border Guard was not only actively present in border areas, but also in cities, especially at junctions such as railway stations, where there was a risk of illegal immigrants. In addition, it also performed general police duties, and the border guards, wearing dark blue uniforms and baseball caps or optionally green berets, often patrolled and took action together with the police.

== Merger with police ==
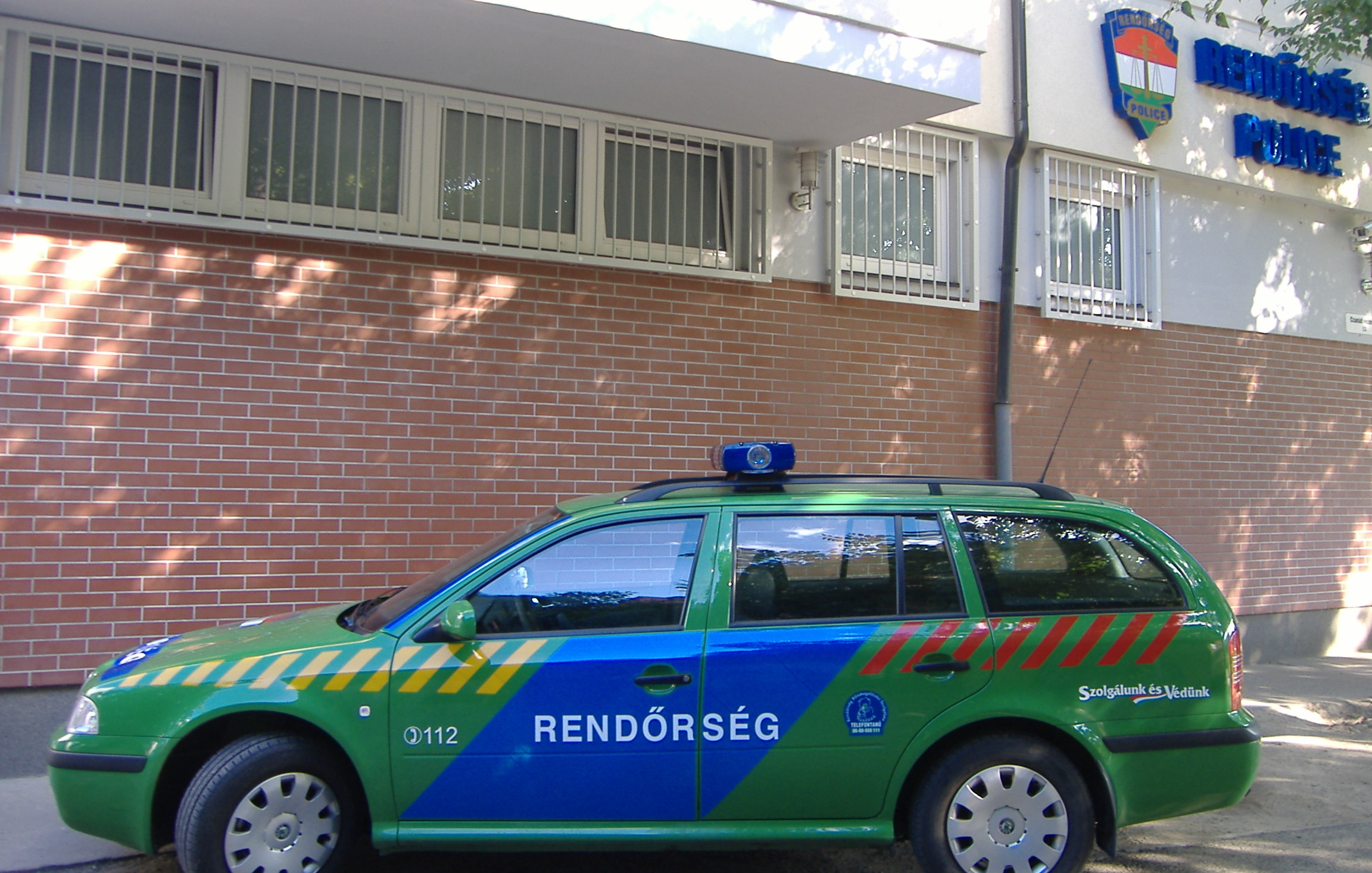
Police vehicle in Makó, Csanád Vezér Square. The car was previously used by the Border Guard; after the merger in 2008, it received new lettering, but its characteristic green base colour was retained.

After Hungary's accession to the European Union, it was thought that as the process progressed, an independent Border Guard would no longer be needed, so a plan was prepared to merge the Police and the Border Guard. According to this, the border guards in the EU border areas would simply merge into the police, while in the eastern border areas the organization would retain its independence, but within the Police, under the name of the Border Protection Directorate.

These plans were continuously modified from the beginning of 2007 and envisaged the complete integration of the two organizations. What remained of the preliminary plans was that the county police chief posts of certain Hungarian counties located along the EU's external borders were given to border guard generals, thus three out of the twenty county posts were given to border guards, Bács-Kiskun County, Baranya County, Szabolcs–Szatmár–Bereg County and the commander position of the Ferihegy Police Directorate, whose most important task is the law enforcement administration of the country's largest border crossing, Ferihegy Airport. However, the Border Guard ceased to exist at the national level as an independent public administrative body and independent legal entity.

On 1 January 2008, the body merged into the Police of Hungary, its organizational independence ceased, and its real estate, vehicles and other assets worth approximately 40 billion forints were transferred to the Police.

== Legislation ==
The Border Guard's task system was established by Act XX of 1949, as amended by Act CIV of 2004, in Article 40/A of the Constitution of the Republic of Hungary: "The basic task of the Border Guard is to guard the state border and maintain order."

According to Act XXXIV of 1994 on the Police, Section 97, the law enforcement agencies of Hungary were the police, the border guard, the state agencies of civil protection, the professional firefighters, the disaster relief forces, the customs and financial guard agencies, and the penitentiary body.

According to Act XXXII of 1997 on the Border Guard and the Border Guard, as amended by Act XXXIII of 2001, Section 2. According to: The Border Guard carries out its border policing tasks based on the provisions of the above law and other laws and regulations applicable to it.

== Commanders ==
- György Pálffy 1946–1948
- Mihály Szalvai 1948–1949
- József Kajli 1950
- László Piros 1950–1953
- János Valencsák 1953–1956
- János Szalva 1956–1957
- Lajos Gyurkó 1957–1960
- Mihály Korom 1960–1963
- Gusztáv Szabó 1964–1974
- Jenő Földesi 1974–1976
- Imre Tóth 1976–1986
- János Székely 1986–1990
- Lieutenant General Balázs Nováky 1990–1999
- Lieutenant General József Béndek Lieutenant General 1999–2007
