= András Tasnádi Nagy =

Hungarian politician and jurist

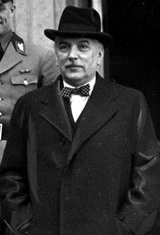

Minister of Justice of Hungary
- In office 15 November 1938 – 9 November 1939
- Preceded by: Ödön Mikecz
- Succeeded by: László Radocsay

Personal details
- Born: 29 January 1882 Budapest, Austria-Hungary
- Died: 1 July 1956 (aged 74) Budapest, People's Republic of Hungary
- Political party: Unity Party, Party of National Unity, Party of Hungarian Life
- Profession: politician, jurist

András Tasnádi Nagy (29 January 1882 – 1 July 1956) was a Hungarian politician and jurist, who served as Minister of Justice between 1938 and 1939.

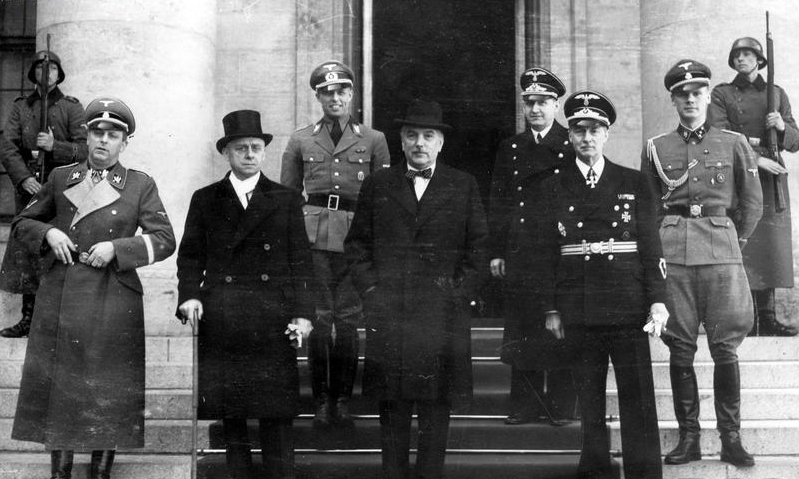
Tasnádi Nagy (middle) with Döme Sztójay and German SS officers in 1940

== Life ==
He finished law studies at the Faculty of Law of the University of Budapest. He worked as a lawyer from 1908. He worked for the Hungarian Railways as counsel between 1910 and 1925, and as attorney general until 1926. He became administrative state secretary of the Ministry of Justice in 1933 later he served in the Ministry of Religion and Education. Tasnádi Nagy was elected to the Diet of Hungary in the colours of the governing Party of National Unity in 1935. He regained his seat in 1939. He was appointed justice minister in the Béla Imrédy cabinet.

He served as Speaker of the House of Representatives from 1 November 1939 to 29 March 1945. He also held his position after the Arrow Cross Party's coup. He became a leading member of the National Alliance of Lawmakers which was established by the Nazi-dominated puppet government. As a result of this after the Second World War Tasnádi Nagy was arrested and sentenced to life imprisonment by the People's Tribunal in Budapest. The first judgement was death, but Zoltán Tildy, the President of Hungary provided grace, so it was changed. Tasnádi Nagy died in captivity.

Political offices
Preceded by Ödön Mikecz	Minister of Justice; 1938–1939	Succeeded by László Radocsay
Preceded by Kálmán Darányi	Speaker of the House of Representatives; 1939–1945	Succeeded by office abolished
