= Sándor Plósz =

Hungarian politician and jurist

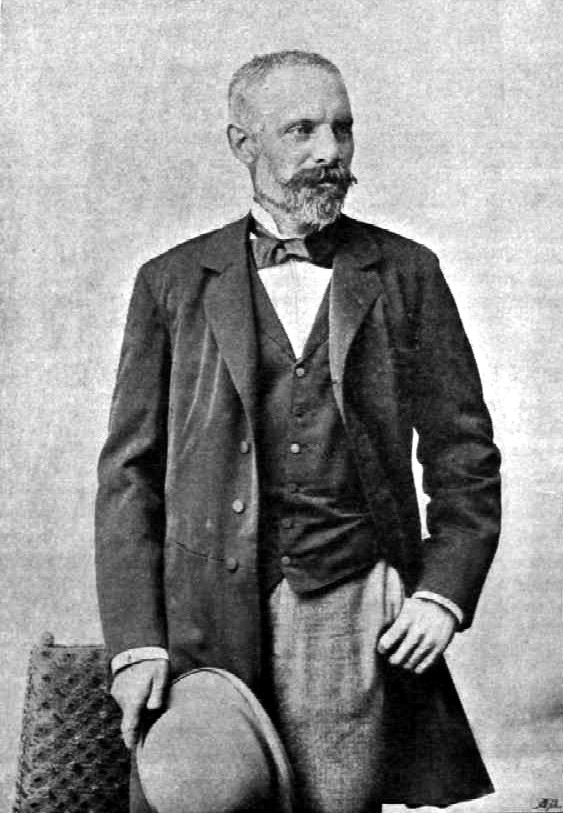

Minister of Justice of Hungary
- In office 26 February 1899 – 18 June 1905
- Preceded by: Sándor Erdély
- Succeeded by: Bertalan Lányi

Personal details
- Born: June 10, 1846; Pest, Kingdom of Hungary
- Died: 29 May 1925 (aged 78); Budapest, Kingdom of Hungary
- Political party: Liberal Party
- Profession: politician, jurist

Sándor Plósz (10 June 1846 - 29 May 1925) was a Hungarian politician and jurist, who served as Minister of Justice between 1899 and 1905. He was a member of the Hungarian Academy of Sciences. He became representative of the House of Magnates in 1914.

Political offices
Preceded by Sándor Erdély	Minister of Justice; 1899–1905	Succeeded by Bertalan Lányi
