= Károly Grecsák =

Hungarian politician and jurist

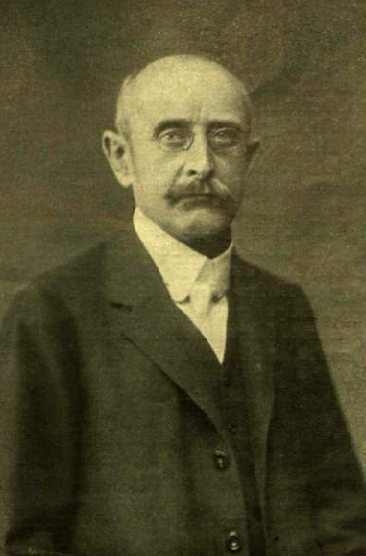

Minister of Justice of Hungary
- In office 18 August 1917 – 25 January 1918
- Prime Minister: Sándor Wekerle
- Preceded by: Vilmos Vázsonyi
- Succeeded by: Vilmos Vázsonyi

Personal details
- Born: November 15, 1854 Versec, Kingdom of Hungary
- Died: 17 December 1924 (aged 70) Budapest, Kingdom of Hungary
- Party: Party of Hungarian Order
- Profession: politician, jurist

Károly Grecsák (15 November 1854 - 17 December 1924) was a Hungarian politician and jurist, who served as Minister of Justice between 1917 and 1918. He was a representative of the Moderate Opposition from 1881 to 1891. He was the founder and an editor of the first German language oppositional newspaper, the Budapester Tageblatt. From 1891 he worked as a judge for the Court of Szeged, later moved to Budapest to the Court. After the ministership he became a lawyer in the capital city. He was the founder and chairman of the Party of Hungarian Order which functioned from 1920 to 1922.

Political offices
Preceded by Vilmos Vázsonyi	Minister of Justice; 1917–1918	Succeeded by Vilmos Vázsonyi
