= István Antal =

Hungarian politician

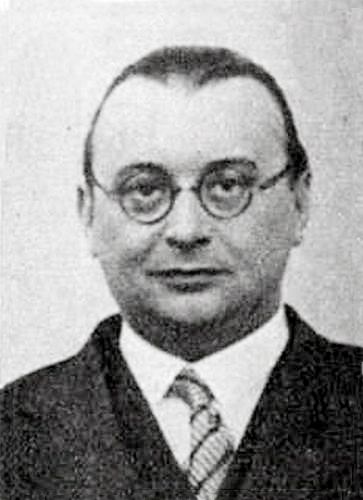

Minister of Religion and Education of Hungary
- In office 22 March 1944 – 29 August 1944
- Prime Minister: Döme Sztójay
- Preceded by: Jenő Szinyei Merse
- Succeeded by: Iván Rakovszky

Personal details
- Born: 18 February 1896 Kenderes, Austria-Hungary
- Died: 11 October 1975 (aged 79) Budapest, Hungarian People's Republic
- Party: Hungarian National Independence Party, Unity Party, Party of National Unity, Party of Hungarian Life
- Profession: politician

István Antal (18 February 1896 – 11 October 1975) was a Hungarian politician, who served as Minister of Religion and Education and as Minister of Justice in 1944. Born in Kenderes, he knew Miklós Horthy from here, who was born here likewise. He fought in the First World War, and after his return from the front joined several right extremist student organizations. Antal founded the Red-White Bloc firstly, which worked against Mihály Károlyi's republic then the Hungarian Soviet Republic, then he became one of the leaders of the Turul Student Organization. He met Mihály Kolosváry-Borcsa here at first.

Antal soon finished the University of Law. After that he served as press officer of Prime Minister Gyula Gömbös, later became state secretary of the Ministry of Justice. He was member of the Miklós Kállay cabinet from 1942 as Minister without portfolio of National Defence and Propaganda. After the German occupation the new prime minister Döme Sztójay appointed him Minister of Justice and Minister of Religion and Education. In these times he actively took a part in creating the newer anti-Jewish laws and their introduction. He did not take part in the governance after the Arrow Cross Party's coup. In addition he was arrested for a short time, because of criticizing Ferenc Szálasi's mental efficiency.

After the Second World War he was sentenced to death for war crimes by the People's Tribune in Budapest, but he was not executed due to Mátyás Rákosi's personal intervention. For the second time he was sentenced to life imprisonment. Antal was set free in 1960, and lived until his death in retirement. His memoirs were published in 2004.

Political offices
Preceded by Jenő Szinyei Merse	Minister of Religion and Education; 1944	Succeeded by Iván Rakovszky
Preceded by László Radocsay	Minister of Justice; 1944	Succeeded by Gábor Vladár
