= Gusztáv Gegus =

Hungarian politician and jurist

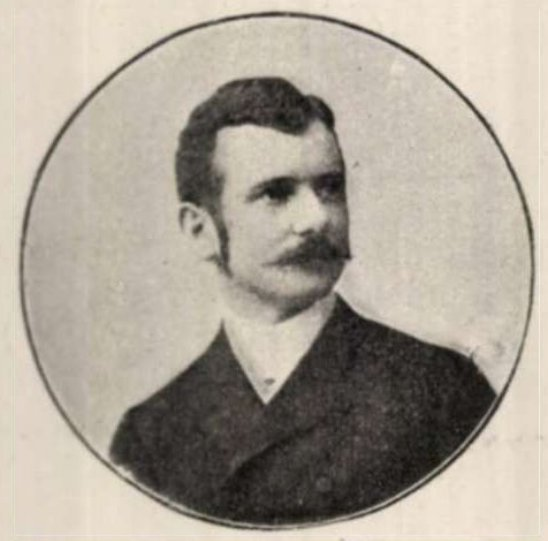

Minister of Justice of Hungary
- In office 2 April 1906 – 8 April 1906
- Preceded by: Bertalan Lányi
- Succeeded by: Géza Polónyi

Personal details
- Born: October 5, 1855; Pilismarót, Kingdom of Hungary
- Died: 19 February 1933 (aged 77); Budapest, Kingdom of Hungary
- Political party: Independent
- Profession: politician, jurist

Gusztáv Gegus (5 October 1855 - 19 February 1933) was a Hungarian politician and jurist, who served as Minister of Justice for several days in 1906.

Political offices
Preceded by Bertalan Lányi	Minister of Justice; 1906	Succeeded by Géza Polónyi
