= Ágoston Valentiny =

Hungarian politician and jurist

Minister of Justice of Hungary
- In office 22 December 1944 (officially 28 March 1945) – 21 July 1945
- Preceded by: László Budinszky
- Succeeded by: István Ries

Personal details
- Born: October 6, 1888 Kalocsa, Austria-Hungary
- Died: 21 August 1958 (aged 69) Budapest, People's Republic of Hungary
- Party: MSZDP
- Profession: politician, jurist

Ágoston Valentiny (6 October 1888 – 21 August 1958) was a Hungarian politician and jurist, who served as Minister of Justice in the Interim National Government. He was born into a working-class family with six children. His father was a machine fitter and engineer. Valentiny finished his law studies in Kolozsvár. He joined the Hungarian Social Democratic Party on 1 January 1919. During the German occupation in 1944 he was interned. After the "Liberation" of Szeged he became mayor of the town. He was a member of the Interim National Assembly.

After the 1945 elections he had to resign from the ministerial position because of the communists' attacks. After that he worked as a lawyer. He was arrested and sentenced in a show trial in 1950. He was set free after five years. After his death he was rehabilitated.

Political offices
Preceded by László Budinszky	Minister of Justice; 1944–1945	Succeeded by István Ries
