= Vilmos Vázsonyi =

Hungarian politician (1868–1926)

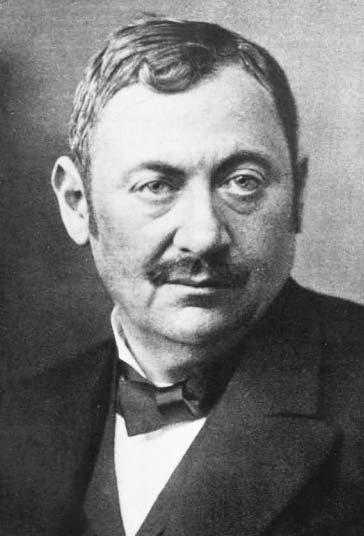

Minister of Justice
- In office 15 June 1917 – 18 August 1917
- Prime Minister: Móric Esterházy
- Preceded by: Jenő Balogh
- Succeeded by: Károly Grecsák
- In office 25 January 1918 – 8 May 1918
- President: Sándor Wekerle
- Preceded by: Károly Grecsák
- Succeeded by: Gusztáv Tőry

Personal details
- Born: 22 March 1868 Sümeg, Austria-Hungary
- Died: 29 May 1926 (aged 58) Baden bei Wien, Austria
- Party: National Democratic Civil Party
- Profession: politician, lawyer

Vilmos Vázsonyi (born as Vilmos Weiszfeld; 1868–1926) was a Hungarian publicist and politician of Jewish heritage.

== Biography ==
Vázsonyi was born at Sümeg. He was educated at Budapest, where his remarkable eloquence made him the leader of all student movements during his university career. After he had completed his studies, the most vital social questions found in him an earnest investigator. He aroused a national sentiment against dueling, his success being proved by the numerous anti-dueling clubs in Hungary. Later, he began a social and journalistic agitation on behalf of the official recognition of the Jewish religion, and kept the matter before the public until the law granting recognition was sanctioned in 1895.

In 1894, Vázsonyi founded the first democratic club in Budapest, and became a common councilor. In 1900, he established the political weekly "Új Század" ("The New Century") for the dissemination of democratic ideas throughout the country. At the same time, he organized democratic clubs in all the large Hungarian cities. In 1901, Vázsonyi was elected deputy for the sixth district of the capital, on a democratic platform, of which he was the only public representative in the Hungarian Parliament as of 1906. At the election of 26 January 1905 he defeated Hieronymi, minister of commerce, as a candidate for the deputy-ship from his district.

Vázsonyi died on 1 June 1926 from cardiac arrest, after injuries suffered in an assault by Ferenc Gyulai Molnár and the notorious anti-Semite Lászlo Vannay, described as "Ford's protege".

== Writings ==
Besides numbers of articles in the daily press, Vázsonyi wrote the following works:

- "Önkormányzat" (1890), on autonomy
- "A Választási elv a Külföldi Közigazgatásban" (1891), on the principle of election in foreign governments
- "A Szavazás Deczentralizácziója" (1892), on decentralization in voting
- "A Királyi Placetum a Magyar Alkotmányban" (1893), on the royal veto in the Hungarian constitution

Political offices
Preceded by Jenő Balogh	Minister of Justice; 1917	Succeeded by Károly Grecsák
Preceded by Károly Grecsák	Minister of Justice; 1918	Succeeded by Gusztáv Tőry
