= Mihály Korom =

Hungarian politician and jurist

Minister of Justice of Hungary
- In office 7 December 1966 – 22 April 1978
- Preceded by: Ferenc Nezvál
- Succeeded by: Imre Markója

Personal details
- Born: 9 October 1927 Mindszent, Kingdom of Hungary
- Died: 3 October 1993 (aged 65) Budapest, Hungary
- Party: MKP, MDP, MSZMP
- Spouse: dr. Kővágó Ilona
- Children: Mihály
- Profession: politician, jurist

Mihály Korom (9 October 1927 - 3 October 1993) was a Hungarian politician and jurist, who served as Minister of Justice between 1966 and 1978. From 1960 to 1963 he served as the commander of the Border Guard of Hungary.

Political offices
Preceded by Ferenc Nezvál	Minister of Justice; 1966–1978	Succeeded by Imre Markója
