= József Petrétei =

Hungarian politician

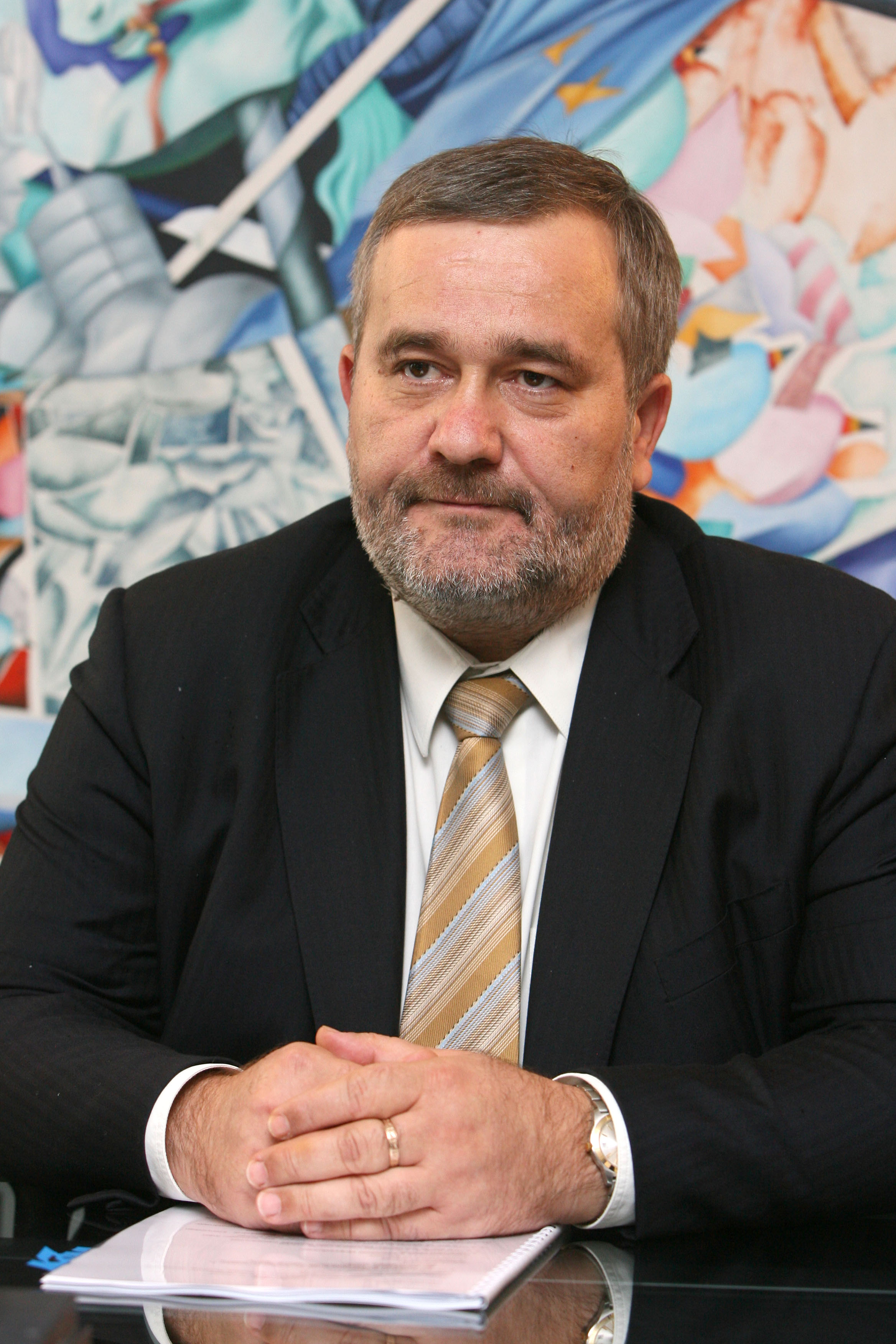
- József Petrétei in 2006

Minister of Justice and Law Enforcement
- In office 9 June 2006 – 31 May 2007
- Preceded by: himself
- Succeeded by: Albert Takács

Minister of Justice
- In office 4 October 2004 – 9 June 2006
- Preceded by: Péter Bárándy
- Succeeded by: himself

Personal details
- Born: 10 October 1958 (age 66); Pécs, Hungary
- Political party: Independent
- Children: 3
- Profession: politician, jurist, teacher

József Petrétei (born 10 October 1958) is former Minister of Justice in Hungary. The office was renamed to Ministry of Justice and Law Enforcement after the 2006 election.

He is involved in controversial plans to allow possession of pornographic material involving people between 14 and 18, created and used exclusively by the participants. However, there is no plan to change the existing law (Hungarian Penal Code 195/A. §) that prohibits people over 18 to take, share or circulate pictures of people under 18, therefore much of the controversy derives from misinformation.

During his ministership, the 2006 protests took place in Hungary, which were a series of anti-government protests triggered by the release of Hungarian Prime Minister Ferenc Gyurcsány's private speech in which he confessed that his Hungarian Socialist Party had lied to win the 2006 election, and had done nothing worth mentioning in the previous four years of governing. Most of the events took place in Budapest and other major cities between 17 September and 23 October. After the siege of the Magyar Televízió building (18 September 2006), Petrétei resigned but Gyurcsány disclaimed his decision.

On 20 May 2007, Gyurcsány announced the resignations of József Petrétei, National Police Chief László Bene and Budapest Police Chief Péter Gergényi. Gyurcsány said the move is intended to restore public confidence in Hungary's police and justice systems. News stories attribute the move to recent police scandals and the cloud cast by the disproportionate use of force during the 2006 anti-government demonstrations.

Later, in 2010, Petrétei said before the parliamentary sub-committee which investigated alleged contraventions, police crimes or maladministration during the 2006 protests that he did not give instructions to the policemen and he saw the Budapest riots and the MTV siege at his home on 18–19 September. He did not know about that a political intervention would have happened into the police's work.

== Works ==
- Petrétei, József: Magyarország alkotmányjoga I. Alapvetés, alkotmányos intézmények Pécs, 2013, Kodifikátor Alapítvány. ISBN 978-963-89912-0-1
- Petrétei József: Magyarország alkotmányjoga II.: Államszervezet. Pécs, 2013, Kodifikátor Alapítvány. ISBN 978-963-08-6359-9
- Petrétei József et al.: Magyar alkotmányjog III. ISBN 9639542350
- Petrétei József et al.: Jogalkotástan. 2004, Dialóg Campus. ISBN 9639542377
- Petrétei, József: A törvényhozás elmélete és gyakorlata a parlamentáris demokráciában; Osiris Kiadó, Budapest, 1998.
- Petrétei József: Az alkotmányos demokrácia alapintézményei; Dialóg Campus, 2009. ISBN 9789639542495

== Notes ==
Political offices
Preceded by Péter Bárándy	Minister of Justice; 2004–2006	Succeeded by office abolished
Preceded by office established	Minister of Justice and Law Enforcement; 2006–2007	Succeeded by Albert Takács
