= Péter Bárándy =

Hungarian politician and jurist

Minister of Justice
- In office 27 May 2002 – 4 October 2004
- Prime Minister: Péter Medgyessy
- Preceded by: Ibolya Dávid
- Succeeded by: József Petrétei

Personal details
- Born: 12 June 1949 (age 77) Budapest, Second Hungarian Republic
- Party: Independent
- Children: Gergely Bárándy and 1 other son
- Profession: politician, jurist

Péter Bárándy (born 12 June 1949) is a Hungarian politician and jurist who served as Minister of Justice in Péter Medgyessy's government between 2002 and 2004. He is a member of the Bárándy family, which has played a prominent role in Hungary's legal profession since the 19th century. In 1992, shortly after Hungary's transition to multiparty democracy (Hungarian: rendszerváltás), Bárándy helped found the Republic Party, serving as deputy chairman. The party disbanded in 1996 after repeatedly failing to enter the National Assembly.

Medgyessy appointed Bárándy Minister of Justice on 27 May 2002. During his ministry, Bárándy became a popular politician. Consequently, he was among those nominated to serve as President of the Republic in the run-up to the 2005 election; Bárándy ultimately stepped back, however, after receiving the support of only a few MPs. Bárándy withdrew from politics after Ferenc Gyurcsány became prime minister in 2004.

Political offices
Preceded by Ibolya Dávid	Minister of Justice; 2002–2004	Succeeded by József Petrétei
