= Ferenc Nezvál =

Hungarian politician and jurist

Minister of Justice of Hungary
- In office 9 May 1957 – 7 December 1966
- Preceded by: Erik Molnár
- Succeeded by: Mihály Korom

Personal details
- Born: 7 February 1909; Győr, Austria-Hungary
- Died: 26 November 1987 (aged 78); Budapest, People's Republic of Hungary
- Political party: MKP, MDP, MSZMP
- Profession: politician, jurist
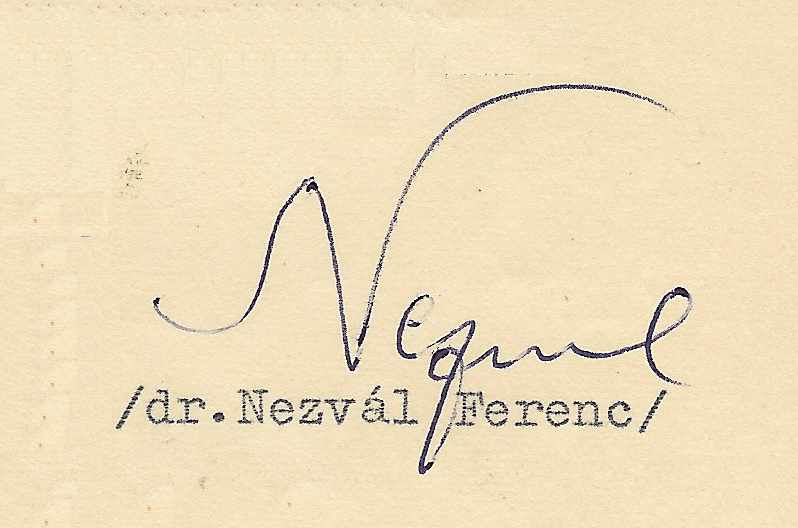
- Signature

Ferenc Nezvál (7 February 1909 – 26 November 1987) was a Hungarian politician and jurist, who served as Minister of Justice between 1957 and 1966.

Political offices
Preceded by Erik Molnár	Minister of Justice; 1957–1966	Succeeded by Mihály Korom
