= László Budinszky =

Hungarian politician

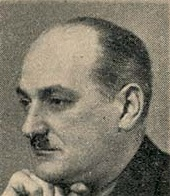

Minister of Justice of Hungary
- In office 16 October 1944 – 27 March 1945
- Prime Minister: Ferenc Szálasi
- Preceded by: Gábor Vladár
- Succeeded by: Ágoston Valentiny

Personal details
- Born: 24 October 1895 Budapest, Austria-Hungary
- Died: 9 March 1946 (aged 50) Budapest, Second Hungarian Republic
- Cause of death: Execution by hanging
- Party: Arrow Cross Party
- Profession: politician

László Budinszky (24 October 1895 – 9 March 1946) was a Hungarian politician, who served as Minister of Justice between 1944 and 1945. He prepared the proposal about the formation of the Leader of the Nation position. He also ordered that the political convicts should be handed over to the Nazi authorities. After the fall of Budapest he tried to escape into Western Europe but the arrival American troops captured him with other members of the Arrow Cross Party's government. He was tried by the People's Tribunal in Budapest in open sessions and sentenced to death for war crimes and high treason. Budinszky was hanged in 1946 in Budapest.

Political offices
| Preceded by Gábor Vladár | Minister of Justice; 1944–1945 | Succeeded by Ágoston Valentiny |
