= Imre Markója =

Hungarian politician and jurist

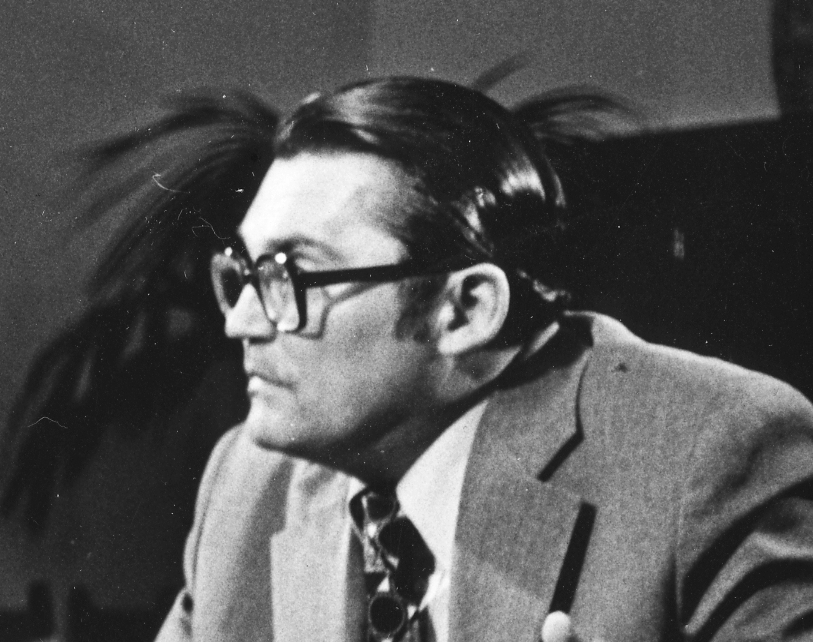

Minister of Justice of Hungary
- In office 22 April 1978 – 29 June 1988
- Preceded by: Mihály Korom
- Succeeded by: Kálmán Kulcsár

Personal details
- Born: 1931
- Died: 27 March 2008 (aged 76–77)
- Party: MSZMP
- Profession: politician, jurist
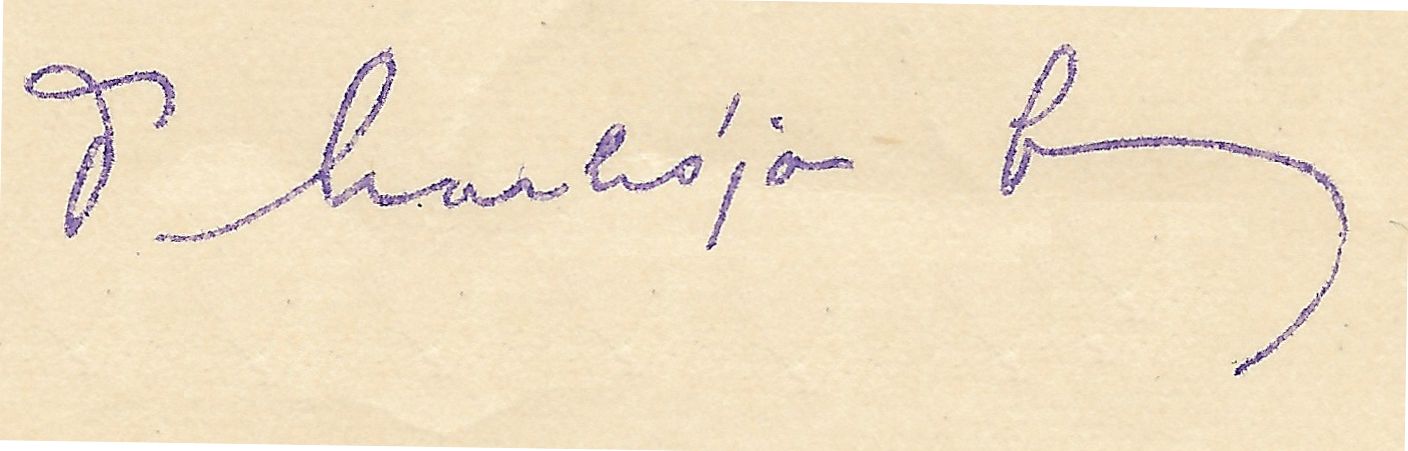
- Signature

Imre Markója (1931 – 27 March 2008) was a Hungarian politician and jurist, who served as Minister of Justice between 1978 and 1988.

Political offices
Preceded by Mihály Korom	Minister of Justice; 1978–1988	Succeeded by Kálmán Kulcsár
