= Sándor Erdély =

Hungarian politician and jurist

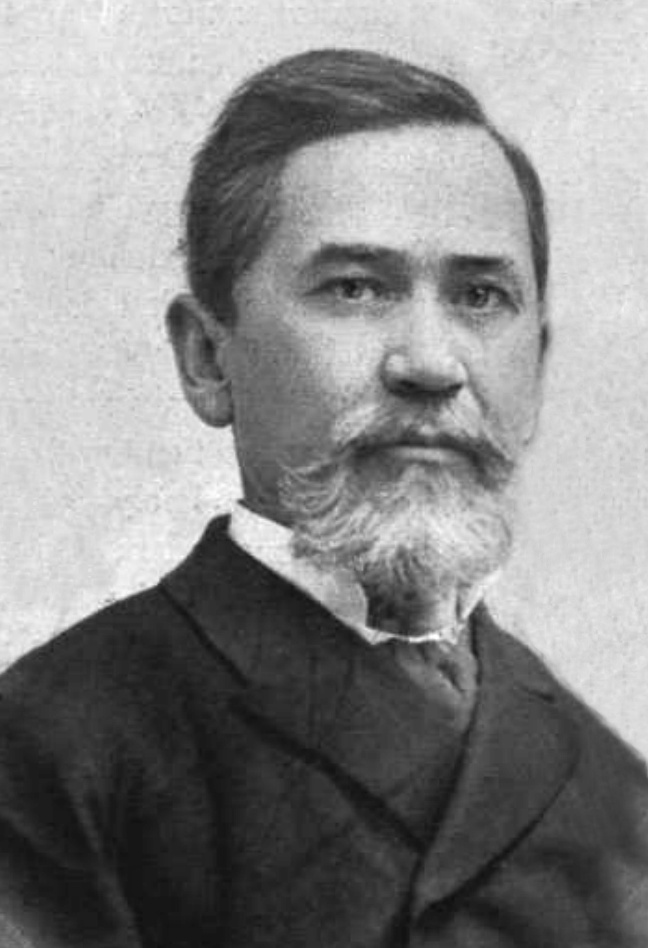

Minister of Justice of Hungary
- In office 15 January 1895 – 26 February 1899
- Preceded by: Dezső Szilágyi
- Succeeded by: Sándor Plósz

Personal details
- Born: 1 August 1839 Köröskisjenő, Kingdom of Hungary
- Died: 15 May 1922 (aged 82) Budapest, Kingdom of Hungary
- Party: Liberal Party, Party of National Work
- Profession: politician, jurist

Sándor Erdély (1 August 1839 - 15 May 1922) was a Hungarian politician and jurist, who served as Minister of Justice between 1895 and 1899.

Political offices
Preceded by Dezső Szilágyi	Minister of Justice; 1895–1899	Succeeded by Sándor Plósz
