= György Baloghy =

Hungarian politician and jurist

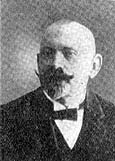

Minister of Justice of Hungary
- In office 15 August 1919 – 17 September 1919
- Preceded by: Béla Szászy
- Succeeded by: Béla Zoltán

Personal details
- Born: October 22, 1861 Derencsény, Kingdom of Hungary
- Died: 22 October 1931 (aged 70) Budapest, Kingdom of Hungary
- Party: Independent
- Profession: politician, jurist

György Baloghy (22 October 1861 – 22 October 1931) was a Hungarian politician and jurist, who served as Minister of Justice in 1919.

== See also ==
- Minister of Justice (Hungary)

Political offices
Preceded by Béla Szászy	Minister of Justice; 1919	Succeeded by Béla Zoltán
