= Bertalan Lányi =

Hungarian politician and jurist

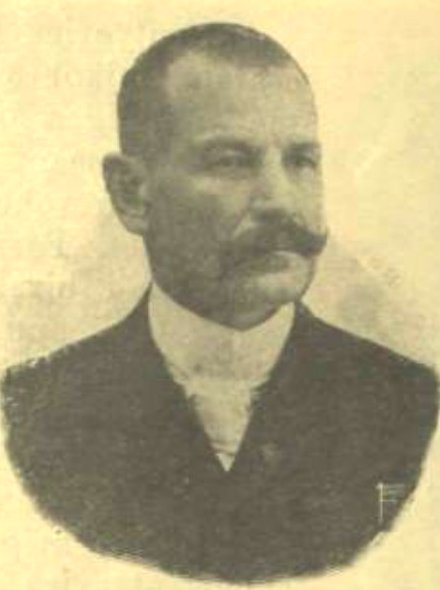

Minister of Justice of Hungary
- In office 18 June 1905 – 2 April 1906
- Preceded by: Sándor Plósz
- Succeeded by: Gusztáv Gegus

Personal details
- Born: March 21, 1851; Hibbe, Kingdom of Hungary
- Died: 15 February 1921 (aged 69); Budapest, Kingdom of Hungary
- Political party: Liberal Party
- Profession: politician, jurist

Bertalan Lányi (born as Bertalan Jakobi 21 March 1851 – 15 February 1921) was a Hungarian politician and jurist, who served as Minister of Justice between 1905 and 1906.

Political offices
Preceded by Sándor Plósz	Minister of Justice; 1905–1906	Succeeded by Gusztáv Gegus
