= Gusztáv Tőry =

Hungarian politician and jurist

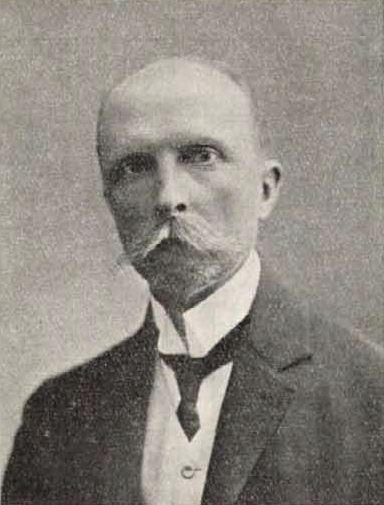

Minister of Justice of Hungary
- In office 8 May 1918 – 31 October 1918
- Prime Minister: Sándor Wekerle
- Preceded by: Vilmos Vázsonyi
- Succeeded by: Barna Buza

Personal details
- Born: 24 October 1857 Pest, Kingdom of Hungary
- Died: 31 October 1925 (aged 68) Budapest, Kingdom of Hungary
- Party: Independent
- Spouse: Aranka Burián
- Profession: politician, jurist

Gusztáv Tőry (24 October 1857 – 31 October 1925) was a Hungarian politician and jurist, who served as Minister of Justice in 1918. He was the chairman of the Court from 1920 to 1925.

Political offices
Preceded by Vilmos Vázsonyi	Minister of Justice; 1918	Succeeded by Barna Buza
Legal offices
Preceded by Antal Günther	President of the Curia Regia; 1920–1925	Succeeded by Andor Juhász
