= Géza Polónyi =

Hungarian politician and jurist

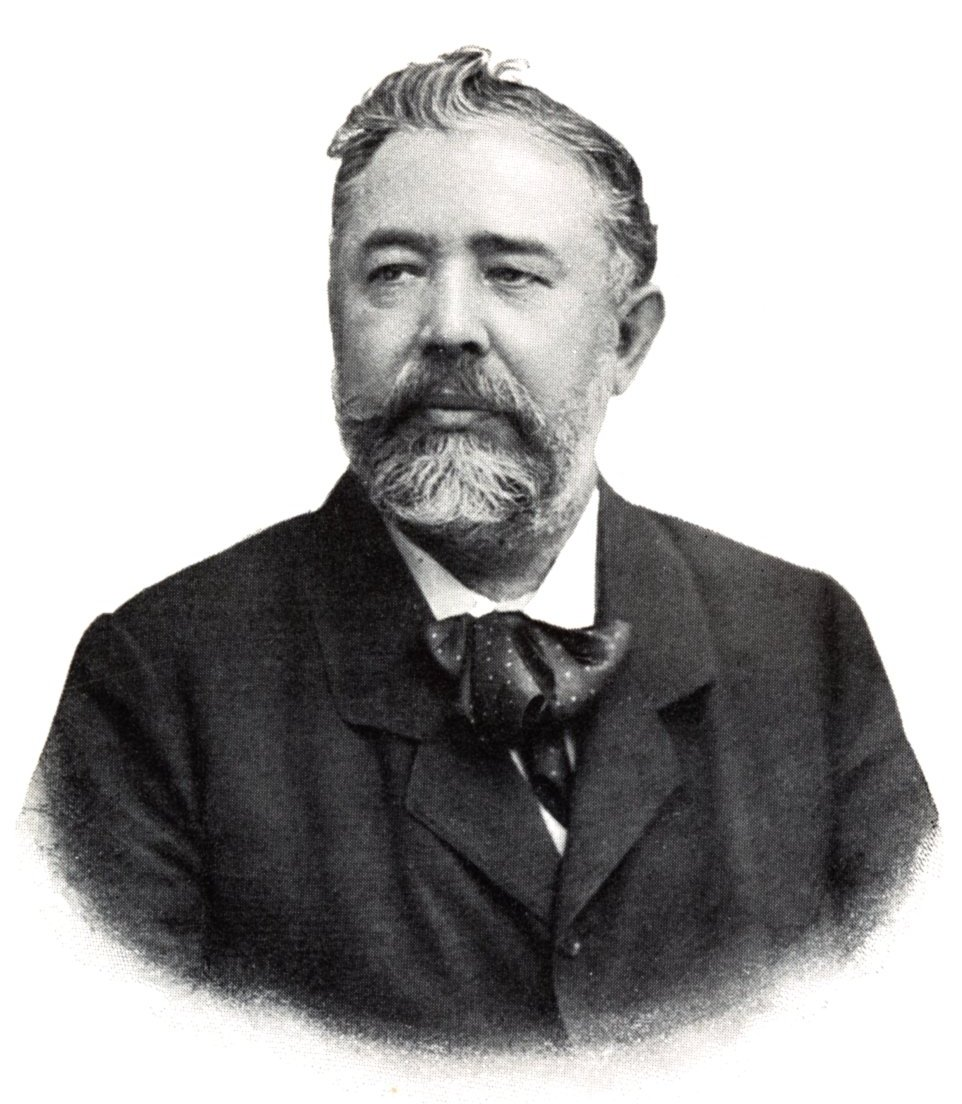

Minister of Justice of Hungary
- In office 8 April 1906 – 2 February 1907
- Preceded by: Gusztáv Gegus
- Succeeded by: Antal Günther

Personal details
- Born: April 3, 1848; Zsitvakenéz, Kingdom of Hungary
- Died: 1 February 1920 (aged 71); Budapest, Hungary
- Political party: Independence Party
- Profession: politician, jurist

Géza Polónyi (3 April 1848 – 2 February 1920) was a Hungarian politician and jurist, who served as Minister of Justice between 1906 and 1907. He was a major politician of the Independence Party. He actively took part in the filibuster against the government in 1903. After his resignation he criticized the governing party many times (especially interior minister Gyula Andrássy the Younger). During the Hungarian Soviet Republic he was interned.

Political offices
Preceded by Gusztáv Gegus	Minister of Justice; 1906–1907	Succeeded by Antal Günther
