= Ernő Garami =

Hungarian politician (1876–1935)

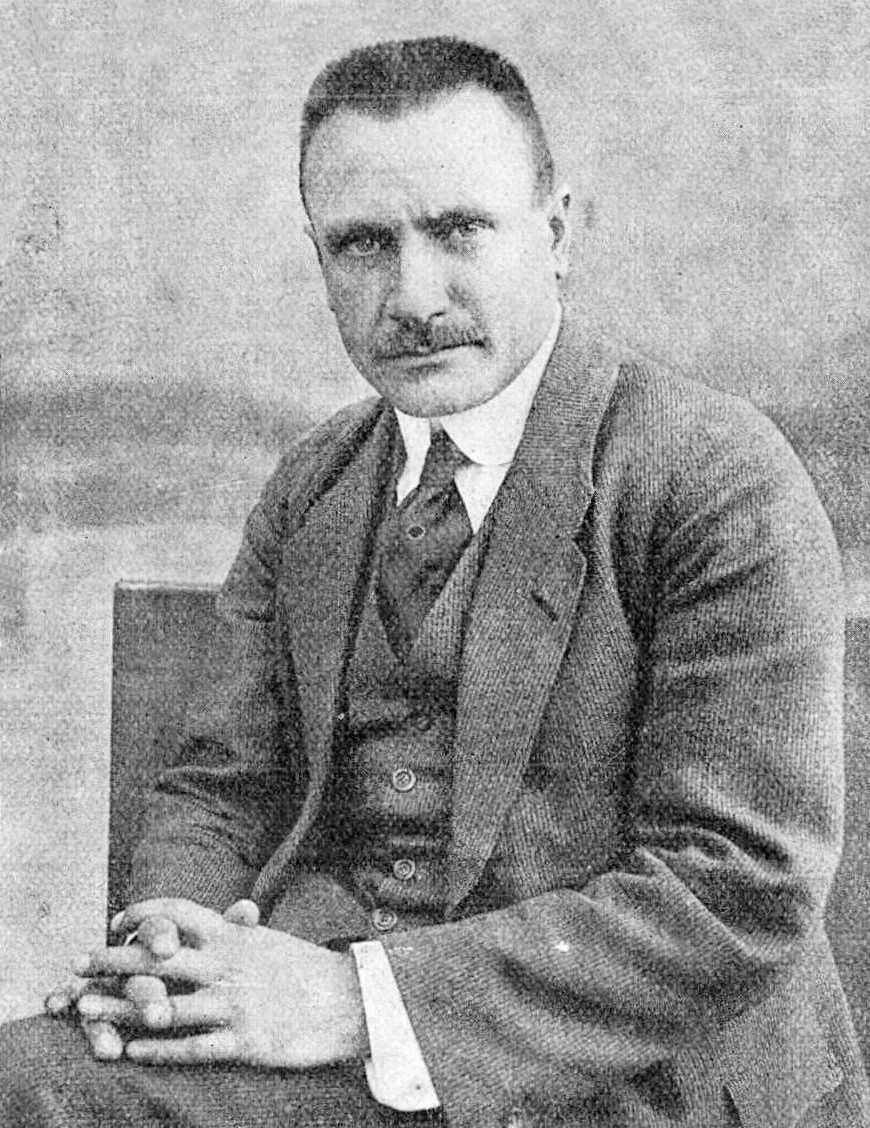

Minister of Justice of Hungary
- In office 1 August 1919 – 6 August 1919
- Preceded by: Zoltán Rónai
- Succeeded by: Béla Szászy

Personal details
- Born: December 13, 1876; Budapest, Austria-Hungary
- Died: 28 May 1935 (aged 58); Budapest, Kingdom of Hungary
- Political party: MSZDP
- Children: Ernő Tibor; Ervin
- Parent: Eduárd Garami
- Profession: politician, mechanic

Ernő Garami (born as Ernő Grünbaum, 13 December 1876 – 28 May 1935) was a Hungarian mechanic who became a social democratic politician and editor, who served as Minister of Justice in 1919.

Political offices
Preceded by Zoltán Rónai	Minister of Justice; 1919	Succeeded by Béla Szászy
