= Béla Szászy =

Hungarian politician and jurist

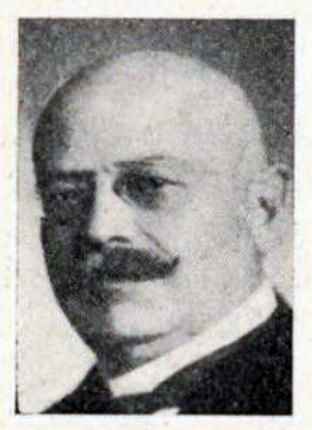

Minister of Justice of Hungary
- In office 7 August 1919 – 15 August 1919
- Preceded by: Ernő Garami
- Succeeded by: György Baloghy

Personal details
- Born: November 26, 1865; Pócsmegyer, Kingdom of Hungary
- Died: 17 June 1931 (aged 65); Budapest, Kingdom of Hungary
- Political party: Independent
- Profession: politician, jurist

Béla Szászy (26 November 1865 – 17 June 1931) was a Hungarian politician and jurist, who served as acting Minister of Justice in 1919.

Political offices
Preceded by Ernő Garami	Minister of Justice; Acting; 1919	Succeeded by György Baloghy
