= Küngös =

- Flag Coat of arms

- Location of Veszprém county in Hungary

- Location of Küngös
- Coordinates: 47.06734°N 18.17438°E
- Country: Hungary
- County: Veszprém

Area
  - Total: 9.4 km^{2} (3.6 sq mi)

Population (2004)
  - Total: 567
  - Density: 60.31/km^{2} (156.2/sq mi)
- Time zone: UTC+1 (CET)
  - Summer (DST): UTC+2 (CEST)
- Postal code: 8162
- Area code: 88

Küngös is a village in Veszprém County, Hungary. It has a local museum, a castle, and a chapel (Church) named Saint Kinga Roman Catholic Church.
