= Teofil Fabiny =

Hungarian politician and jurist

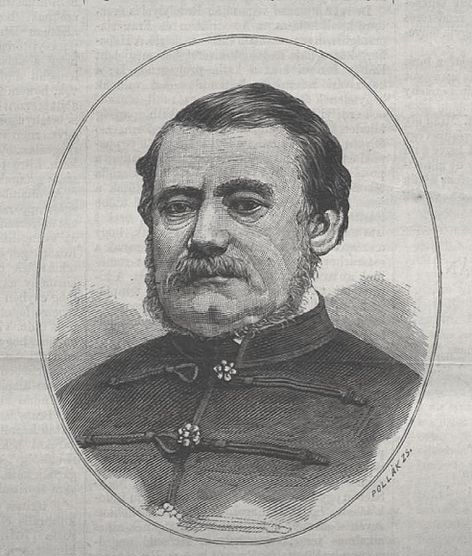

Minister of Justice of Hungary
- In office 15 May 1886 – 9 April 1889
- Preceded by: Tivadar Pauler
- Succeeded by: Dezső Szilágyi

Personal details
- Born: 11 October 1822; Pest, Kingdom of Hungary
- Died: 4 March 1908 (aged 85); Budapest, Austria-Hungary
- Political party: Liberal Party
- Profession: politician, jurist

Teofil Fabiny (also Theophil von Fabiny) (11 October 1822 – 4 March 1908) was a Hungarian politician and jurist, who served as Minister of Justice between 1886 and 1889.

Political offices
Preceded by Tivadar Pauler	Minister of Justice; 1886–1889	Succeeded by Dezső Szilágyi
