= Gábor Vladár =

Hungarian politician and jurist

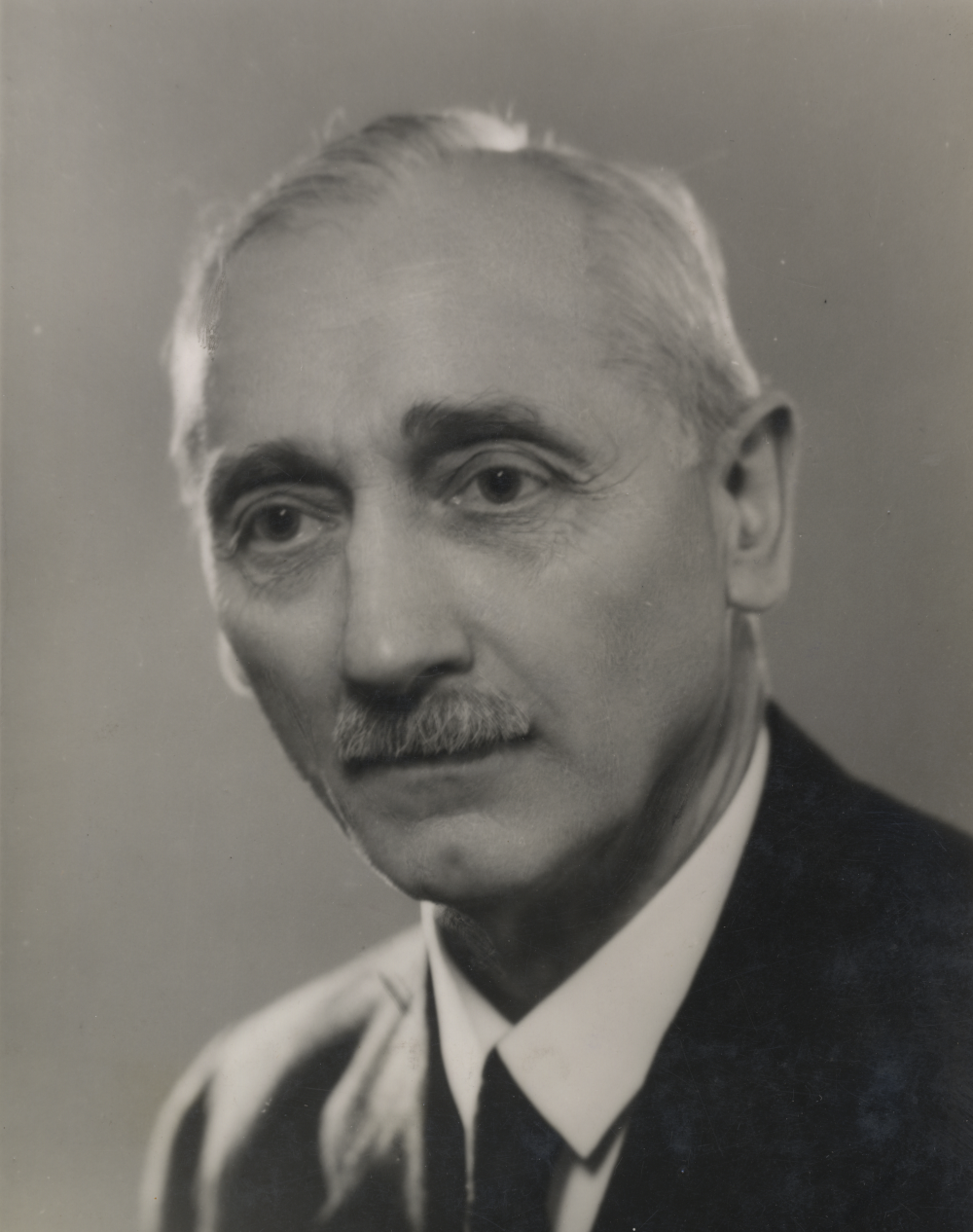

Minister of Justice of Hungary
- In office 29 August 1944 – 16 October 1944
- Preceded by: István Antal
- Succeeded by: László Budinszky

Personal details
- Born: October 14, 1881 Bia, Austria-Hungary
- Died: 19 July 1972 (aged 90) Budapest, People's Republic of Hungary
- Party: Independent
- Profession: politician, jurist

Gábor Vladár (14 October 1881 – 19 July 1972) was a Hungarian politician and jurist, who served as Minister of Justice in 1944. After the ministerial council meeting on 14 October 1944 he decreed the permission of the left-wing press and the forbidding of the far-right media and finally the political prisoners' release.

Political offices
Preceded by István Antal	Minister of Justice; 1944	Succeeded by László Budinszky
