= Minister of Justice (Hungary) =

Cabinet minister responsible for justice affairs in Hungary

The Minister of Justice of Hungary (Hungarian: Magyarország igazságügyi minisztere) is a member of the Hungarian cabinet and the head of the Ministry of Justice. As of 13 May 2026, the justice minister is Márta Görög.

The position was called People's Commissar of Justice (Hungarian: igazságügyi népbiztos) during the Hungarian Soviet Republic in 1919, Minister of Justice and Law Enforcement (Hungarian: igazságügyi és rendészeti miniszter) from 2006 to 2010 and Minister of Public Administration and Justice (Hungarian: közigazgatási és igazságügyi miniszter) between 2010 and 2014.

== Ministers of Justice (1848–1919) ==
=== Hungarian Kingdom (1848–1849) ===
Parties Opposition Party

No.	Portrait	Name (Birth–Death)	Term of office		Political party	Cabinet	Assembly (Election)
1		Ferenc Deák (1803–1876)	17 March 1848	2 October 1848	Opposition Party	Batthyány	Last Diet
1		Ferenc Deák (1803–1876)	17 March 1848	2 October 1848	Opposition Party	Batthyány	1 (1848)
2		Committee of National Defence	2 October 1848	14 April 1849	—	Committee of National Defence	1 (1848)

=== Hungarian State (1849) ===
Parties Opposition Party

No.	Portrait	Name (Birth–Death)	Term of office		Political party	Cabinet	Assembly (Election)
1		Committee of National Defence	14 April 1849	2 May 1849	—	Committee of National Defence	1 (1848)
2		Sebő Vukovics (1811–1872)	2 May 1849	11 August 1849	Opposition Party	Szemere	1 (1848)

After the collapse of the Hungarian Revolution of 1848, the Hungarian Kingdom became an integral part of the Austrian Empire until 1867, when dual Austro-Hungarian Monarchy was created.

=== Hungarian Kingdom (1867–1918) ===
Parties Deák Party/Liberal Party/National Party of Work National Constitution Party F48P/F48P–Károlyi Civic Democratic Party (PDP) Civic Radical Party (PRP) Independent

No.	Portrait	Name (Birth–Death)	Term of office		Political party	Cabinet	Assembly (Election)
1		Boldizsár Horvát (1822–1898)	20 February 1867	5 June 1871	Deák Party	Andrássy; DP	3 (1865)
1		Boldizsár Horvát (1822–1898)	20 February 1867	5 June 1871	Deák Party	Andrássy; DP	4 (1869)
2		István Bittó (1822–1903)	5 June 1871	14 November 1871	Deák Party	Andrássy; DP	4 (1869)
2		István Bittó (1822–1903)	14 November 1871	4 September 1872	Deák Party	Lónyay; DP	4 (1869)
2		István Bittó (1822–1903)	14 November 1871	4 September 1872	Deák Party	Lónyay; DP	5 (1872)
3		Tivadar Pauler (1816–1886); 1st term	4 September 1872	4 December 1872	Deák Party	Lónyay; DP	5 (1872)
3		Tivadar Pauler (1816–1886); 1st term	4 December 1872	21 March 1874	Deák Party	Szlávy; DP	5 (1872)
3		Tivadar Pauler (1816–1886); 1st term	21 March 1874	2 March 1875	Deák Party	Bittó; DP–BK	5 (1872)
4		Béla Perczel (1819–1888)	2 March 1875	20 October 1875	Liberal Party	Wenckheim; SZP	5 (1872)
4		Béla Perczel (1819–1888)	20 October 1875	30 June 1878	Liberal Party	K. Tisza; SZP	6 (1875)
(3)		Tivadar Pauler (1816–1886); 2nd term	30 June 1878	30 April 1886	Liberal Party	K. Tisza; SZP	6 (1875)
(3)		Tivadar Pauler (1816–1886); 2nd term	30 June 1878	30 April 1886	Liberal Party	K. Tisza; SZP	7 (1878)
(3)		Tivadar Pauler (1816–1886); 2nd term	30 June 1878	30 April 1886	Liberal Party	K. Tisza; SZP	8 (1881)
(3)		Tivadar Pauler (1816–1886); 2nd term	30 June 1878	30 April 1886	Liberal Party	K. Tisza; SZP	9 (1884)
5		Teofil Fabiny (1822–1908)	30 April 1886	9 April 1889	Liberal Party	K. Tisza; SZP	9 (1884)
5		Teofil Fabiny (1822–1908)	30 April 1886	9 April 1889	Liberal Party	K. Tisza; SZP	10 (1887)
6		Dezső Szilágyi (1840–1901)	9 April 1889	13 March 1890	Liberal Party	K. Tisza; SZP	10 (1887)
6		Dezső Szilágyi (1840–1901)	13 March 1890	17 November 1892	Liberal Party	Szapáry; SZP	10 (1887)
6		Dezső Szilágyi (1840–1901)	13 March 1890	17 November 1892	Liberal Party	Szapáry; SZP	11 (1892)
6		Dezső Szilágyi (1840–1901)	17 November 1892	15 January 1895	Liberal Party	Wekerle I SZP	11 (1892)
7		Sándor Erdély (1839–1922)	15 January 1895	26 February 1899	Liberal Party	Bánffy; SZP	11 (1892)
7		Sándor Erdély (1839–1922)	15 January 1895	26 February 1899	Liberal Party	Bánffy; SZP	12 (1896)
8		Sándor Plósz (1846–1925)	26 February 1899	27 June 1903	Liberal Party	Széll; SZP	12 (1896)
8		Sándor Plósz (1846–1925)	26 February 1899	27 June 1903	Liberal Party	Széll; SZP	13 (1901)
8		Sándor Plósz (1846–1925)	27 June 1903	3 November 1903	Liberal Party	Khuen-Héderváry I SZP	13 (1901)
8		Sándor Plósz (1846–1925)	3 November 1903	18 June 1905	Liberal Party	I. Tisza I SZP	13 (1901)
9		Bertalan Lányi (1851–1921)	18 June 1905	2 April 1906	Liberal Party	Fejérváry; SZP	14 (1905)
10		Gusztáv Gegus (1855–1933)	2 April 1906	8 April 1906	Independent	Fejérváry; SZP	14 (1905)
11		Géza Polónyi (1848–1920)	8 April 1906	2 February 1907	F48P	Wekerle II; F48P–OAP–KNP–PDP	15 (1906)
12		Antal Günther (1847–1920)	2 February 1907	23 September 1909	F48P	Wekerle II; F48P–OAP–KNP–PDP	15 (1906)
13		Sándor Wekerle (1848–1921)	23 September 1909	17 January 1910	National Constitution Party	Wekerle II; F48P–OAP–KNP–PDP	15 (1906)
14		Ferenc Székely (1842–1921)	17 January 1910	22 April 1912	National Party of Work	Khuen-Héderváry II; NMP	15 (1906)
14		Ferenc Székely (1842–1921)	17 January 1910	22 April 1912	National Party of Work	Khuen-Héderváry II; NMP	16 (1910)
14		Ferenc Székely (1842–1921)	22 April 1912	4 January 1913	National Party of Work	Lukács; NMP	16 (1910)
15		Jenő Balogh (1864–1953)	4 January 1913	15 June 1917	National Party of Work	Lukács; NMP	16 (1910)
15		Jenő Balogh (1864–1953)	4 January 1913	15 June 1917	National Party of Work	I. Tisza II; NMP	16 (1910)
16		Vilmos Vázsonyi (1868–1926); 1st term	15 June 1917	18 August 1917	PDP	Esterházy; NMP–F48P–OAP–PDP–KNP	16 (1910)
17		Károly Grecsák (1854–1924)	18 August 1917	23 August 1917	Independent	Esterházy; NMP–F48P–OAP–PDP–KNP	16 (1910)
17		Károly Grecsák (1854–1924)	23 August 1917	25 January 1918	Independent	Wekerle III; NMP–F48P–OAP–PDP–KNP	16 (1910)
(16)		Vilmos Vázsonyi (1868–1926); 2nd term	25 January 1918	8 May 1918	PDP	Wekerle III; NMP–F48P–OAP–PDP–KNP	16 (1910)
18		Gusztáv Tőry (1857–1925)	8 May 1918	31 October 1918	Independent	Wekerle III; NMP–F48P–OAP–PDP–KNP	16 (1910)
19		Barna Buza (1873–1944)	31 October 1918	4 November 1918	F48P–Károlyi	M. Károlyi; F48P–Károlyi–PRP–MSZDP	MNT (—)
20		Dénes Berinkey (1871–1944)	4 November 1918	16 November 1918	PRP	M. Károlyi; F48P–Károlyi–PRP–MSZDP	MNT (—)

=== Hungarian People's Republic (1918–1919) ===
Parties Civic Radical Party (PRP) F48P–Károlyi

No.	Portrait	Name (Birth–Death)	Term of office		Political party	Cabinet	Assembly (Election)
1		Dénes Berinkey (1871–1944)	4 November 1918	19 January 1919	PRP	M. Károlyi; F48P–Károlyi–PRP–MSZDP	MNT (—)
—		Dénes Berinkey (1871–1944) acting	19 January 1919	24 January 1919	PRP	Berinkey; F48P–Károlyi–PRP–MSZDP–OKGFP	MNT (—)
2		Sándor Juhász Nagy (1883–1946)	24 January 1919	21 March 1919	F48P–Károlyi	Berinkey; F48P–Károlyi–PRP–MSZDP–OKGFP	MNT (—)

== People's Commissars of Justice (1919) ==
=== Hungarian Soviet Republic (1919) ===
Parties MSZP/SZKMMP

No.	Portrait	Name (Birth–Death)	Term of office		Political party	Cabinet	Assembly (Election)
1		Zoltán Rónai (1880–1940) serving with István Ládai from 5 April 1919	21 March 1919	24 June 1919	MSZP/SZKMMP	Central Executive Council; MSZP/SZKMMP	TOGY (—)
(1)		Zoltán Rónai (1880–1940) de facto	24 June 1919	1 August 1919	MSZP/SZKMMP	Central Executive Council; MSZP/SZKMMP	TOGY (—)
1		István Ládai (1873–1936) serving with Zoltán Rónai	5 April 1919	24 June 1919	MSZP/SZKMMP	Central Executive Council; MSZP/SZKMMP	TOGY (—)
2		Péter Ágoston (1874–1925) de jure	24 June 1919	1 August 1919	SZKMMP	Central Executive Council; MSZP/SZKMMP	TOGY (—)

==== Counter-revolutionary governments (1919) ====
Parties Independent

No.	Portrait	Name (Birth–Death)	Term of office		Political party	Cabinet	Assembly (Election)
—		Lajos Pálmai (1866–1937)	5 May 1919	31 May 1919	Independent	Arad	—
—		Gyula Károlyi (1871–1947) acting	31 May 1919	6 June 1919	Independent	Szeged I	—
—		Gyula Károlyi (1871–1947) acting	6 June 1919	12 July 1919	Independent	Szeged II	—

== Ministers of Justice (1919–2006) ==
=== Hungarian People's Republic (1919) ===
Parties MSZDP

No.	Portrait	Name (Birth–Death)	Term of office		Political party	Cabinet	Assembly (Election)
1		Ernő Garami (1876–1935)	1 August 1919	6 August 1919 (deposed)	MSZDP	Peidl; MSZDP	—

=== Hungarian Republic (1919–1920) ===
Parties National Democratic Civil Party (NDPP) Independent

No.	Portrait	Name (Birth–Death)	Term of office		Political party	Cabinet	Assembly (Election)
—		Béla Szászy (1865–1931) acting	7 August 1919	15 August 1919	Independent	Friedrich; KNP/KNEP–OKGFP	—
1		György Baloghy (1861–1931)	15 August 1919	17 September 1919	Independent	Friedrich; KNP/KNEP–OKGFP	—
2		Béla Zoltán (1865–1929)	17 September 1919	24 November 1919	Independent	Friedrich; KNP/KNEP–OKGFP	—
3		István Bárczy (1866–1943)	24 November 1919	29 February 1920	NDPP	Huszár; KNEP–OKGFP–MSZDP–NDPP	—

=== Hungarian Kingdom (1920–1946) ===
Parties National Democratic Civil Party (NDPP) National Smallholders and Agricultural Labourers Party (OKGFP) EP–NEP–MÉP Independent

No.	Portrait	Name (Birth–Death)	Term of office		Political party	Cabinet	Assembly (Election)
1		István Bárczy (1866–1943)	29 February 1920	15 March 1920	KNEP	Huszár; KNEP–OKGFP–MSZDP–NDPP	—
2		Gyula Ferdinandy (1873–1960)	15 March 1920	19 July 1920	OKGFP	Simonyi-Semadam; KNEP–OKGFP	17 (1920)
3		Vilmos Pál Tomcsányi (1880–1959)	19 July 1920	14 April 1921	OKGFP	Teleki I KNEP–OKGFP	17 (1920)
3		Vilmos Pál Tomcsányi (1880–1959)	14 April 1921	16 June 1922	OKGFP	Bethlen (KNEP–OKGFP)→EP	17 (1920)
3		Vilmos Pál Tomcsányi (1880–1959)	14 April 1921	16 June 1922	OKGFP	Bethlen (KNEP–OKGFP)→EP	18 (1922)
4		Géza Daruváry (1866–1934)	16 June 1922	11 June 1923	Independent	Bethlen (KNEP–OKGFP)→EP	18 (1922)
5		Emil Nagy (1871–1956)	11 June 1923	21 February 1924	EP	Bethlen (KNEP–OKGFP)→EP	18 (1922)
—		István Bethlen (1874–1946) acting	21 February 1924	13 March 1924	EP	Bethlen (KNEP–OKGFP)→EP	18 (1922)
6		Pál Pesthy (1873–1952)	13 March 1924	8 January 1929	EP	Bethlen (KNEP–OKGFP)→EP	18 (1922)
6		Pál Pesthy (1873–1952)	13 March 1924	8 January 1929	EP	Bethlen (KNEP–OKGFP)→EP	19 (1926)
—		István Bethlen (1874–1946) acting	8 January 1929	4 February 1929	EP	Bethlen (KNEP–OKGFP)→EP	19 (1926)
7		Tibor Zsitvay (1884–1969)	4 February 1929	24 August 1931	EP	Bethlen (KNEP–OKGFP)→EP	19 (1926)
7		Tibor Zsitvay (1884–1969)	4 February 1929	24 August 1931	EP	Bethlen (KNEP–OKGFP)→EP	20 (1931)
7		Tibor Zsitvay (1884–1969)	24 August 1931	1 October 1932	EP	G. Károlyi; EP–KGSZP	20 (1931)
8		Andor Lázár (1882–1971)	1 October 1932	12 October 1936	NEP	Gömbös; NEP	20 (1931)
8		Andor Lázár (1882–1971)	1 October 1932	12 October 1936	NEP	Gömbös; NEP	21 (1935)
8		Andor Lázár (1882–1971)	12 October 1936	9 March 1938	NEP	Darányi; NEP	21 (1935)
9		Ödön Mikecz (1894–1965)	9 March 1938	14 May 1938	NEP	Darányi; NEP	21 (1935)
9		Ödön Mikecz (1894–1965)	14 May 1938	15 November 1938	NEP	Imrédy; NEP	21 (1935)
10		András Tasnádi Nagy (1882–1956)	15 November 1938	16 February 1939	NEP	Imrédy; NEP	21 (1935)
10		András Tasnádi Nagy (1882–1956)	16 February 1939	9 November 1939	NEP	Teleki II; MÉP	21 (1935)
10		András Tasnádi Nagy (1882–1956)	16 February 1939	9 November 1939	NEP	Teleki II; MÉP	22 (1939)
11		László Radocsay (1878–1968)	9 November 1939	3 April 1941	MÉP	Teleki II; MÉP	22 (1939)
11		László Radocsay (1878–1968)	3 April 1941	9 March 1942	MÉP	Bárdossy; MÉP	22 (1939)
11		László Radocsay (1878–1968)	9 March 1942	22 March 1944 (deposed)	MÉP	Kállay; MÉP	22 (1939)
12		István Antal (1896–1975)	22 March 1944	29 August 1944	MÉP	Sztójay; MÉP–MMP	22 (1939)
13		Gábor Vladár (1881–1972)	29 August 1944	16 October 1944 (deposed)	Independent	Lakatos; MÉP	22 (1939)

==== Government of National Unity (1944–1945) ====
Parties Arrow Cross Party

No.	Portrait	Name (Birth–Death)	Term of office		Political party	Cabinet	Assembly (Election)
1		László Budinszky (1895–1946)	16 October 1944	28 March 1945	NYKP	Szálasi; NYKP–MMP	—

==== Soviet-backed provisional governments (1944–1946) ====
Parties MSZDP

No.	Portrait	Name (Birth–Death)	Term of office		Political party	Cabinet	Assembly (Election)
1		Ágoston Valentiny (1888–1958)	22 December 1944	21 July 1945	MSZDP	Provisional National Government; FKGP–MKP–MSZDP–NPP–PDP	INGY (1944)
2		István Ries (1885–1950)	21 July 1945	15 November 1945	MSZDP	Provisional National Government; FKGP–MKP–MSZDP–NPP–PDP	INGY (1944)
2		István Ries (1885–1950)	15 November 1945	1 February 1946	MSZDP	Tildy; FKGP–MKP–MSZDP–NPP	23 (1945)

=== Hungarian Republic (1946–1949) ===
Parties MSZDP MDP

No.	Portrait	Name (Birth–Death)	Term of office		Political party	Cabinet	Assembly (Election)
1		István Ries (1885–1950)	1 February 1946	31 May 1947	MSZDP	F. Nagy; FKGP–MKP–MSZDP–NPP	23 (1945)
1		István Ries (1885–1950)	31 May 1947	14 June 1948	MSZDP	Dinnyés; MKP–FKGP–MSZDP–NPP	23 (1945)
1		István Ries (1885–1950)	31 May 1947	14 June 1948	MSZDP	Dinnyés; MKP–FKGP–MSZDP–NPP	24 (1947)
(1)		István Ries (1885–1950)	14 June 1948	10 December 1948	MDP	Dinnyés; MKP–FKGP–MSZDP–NPP	24 (1947)
(1)		István Ries (1885–1950)	10 December 1948	20 August 1949	MDP	Dobi; MDP–FKGP–NPP	24 (1947)
(1)		István Ries (1885–1950)	10 December 1948	20 August 1949	MDP	Dobi; MDP–FKGP–NPP	25 (1949)

=== Hungarian People's Republic (1949–1989) ===
Parties MDP-MSZMP

No.	Portrait	Name (Birth–Death)	Term of office		Political party	Cabinet	Assembly (Election)
1		István Ries (1885–1950)	20 August 1949	17 July 1950	MDP	Dobi; MDP	25 (1949)
2		Erik Molnár (1894–1966); 1st term	17 July 1950	14 August 1952	MDP	Dobi; MDP	25 (1949)
2		Erik Molnár (1894–1966); 1st term	14 August 1952	14 November 1952	MDP	Rákosi; MDP	25 (1949)
3		Gyula Décsi (1919–1990)	17 July 1950	2 February 1953	MDP	Rákosi; MDP	25 (1949)
4		Béla Kovács (1910–1980)	2 February 1953	4 July 1953	MDP	Rákosi; MDP	25 (1949)
5		Ferenc Erdei (1910–1971)	4 July 1953	30 October 1954	MDP	I. Nagy I MDP	26 (1953)
6		Erik Molnár (1894–1966); 2nd term	30 October 1954	18 April 1955	MDP	I. Nagy I MDP	26 (1953)
6		Erik Molnár (1894–1966); 2nd term	18 April 1955	24 October 1956	MDP	Hegedüs; MDP	26 (1953)
6		Erik Molnár (1894–1966); 2nd term	24 October 1956	3 November 1956	MDP	I. Nagy II; MDP/MSZMP–FKGP	26 (1953)
7		Ferenc Nezvál (1909–1987)	9 May 1957	28 January 1958	MSZMP	Kádár I MSZMP	26 (1953)
7		Ferenc Nezvál (1909–1987)	28 January 1958	13 September 1961	MSZMP	Münnich; MSZMP	26 (1953)
7		Ferenc Nezvál (1909–1987)	28 January 1958	13 September 1961	MSZMP	Münnich; MSZMP	27 (1958)
7		Ferenc Nezvál (1909–1987)	13 September 1961	30 June 1965	MSZMP	Kádár II; MSZMP	27 (1958)
7		Ferenc Nezvál (1909–1987)	13 September 1961	30 June 1965	MSZMP	Kádár II; MSZMP	28 (1963)
7		Ferenc Nezvál (1909–1987)	30 June 1965	7 December 1966	MSZMP	Kállai; MSZMP	28 (1963)
8		Mihály Korom (1927–1993)	7 December 1966	14 April 1967	MSZMP	Kállai; MSZMP	28 (1963)
8		Mihály Korom (1927–1993)	14 April 1967	15 May 1975	MSZMP	Fock; MSZMP	29 (1967)
8		Mihály Korom (1927–1993)	14 April 1967	15 May 1975	MSZMP	Fock; MSZMP	30 (1971)
8		Mihály Korom (1927–1993)	15 May 1975	22 April 1978	MSZMP	Lázár; MSZMP	30 (1971)
8		Mihály Korom (1927–1993)	15 May 1975	22 April 1978	MSZMP	Lázár; MSZMP	31 (1975)
9		Imre Markója (1931–2008)	22 April 1978	25 June 1987	MSZMP	Lázár; MSZMP	31 (1975)
9		Imre Markója (1931–2008)	22 April 1978	25 June 1987	MSZMP	Lázár; MSZMP	32 (1980)
9		Imre Markója (1931–2008)	22 April 1978	25 June 1987	MSZMP	Lázár; MSZMP	33 (1985)
9		Imre Markója (1931–2008)	25 June 1987	29 June 1988	MSZMP	Grósz; MSZMP	33 (1985)
10		Kálmán Kulcsár (1928–2010)	29 June 1988	24 November 1988	MSZMP	Grósz; MSZMP	33 (1985)
10		Kálmán Kulcsár (1928–2010)	24 November 1988	7 October 1989	MSZMP	Németh (MSZMP)→MSZP	33 (1985)
(10)		Kálmán Kulcsár (1928–2010)	7 October 1989	23 October 1989	Independent	Németh (MSZMP)→MSZP	33 (1985)

=== Hungarian Republic (1989–2006) ===
Parties MSZP MDF Independent

No.	Portrait	Name (Birth–Death)	Term of office		Political party	Cabinet	Assembly (Election)
—		Kálmán Kulcsár (1928–2010) provisional	23 October 1989	23 May 1990	Independent	Németh; MSZP	—
1		István Balsai (1947–2020)	23 May 1990	21 December 1993	MDF	Antall; MDF–FKGP–KDNP	34 (1990)
1		István Balsai (1947–2020)	21 December 1993	15 July 1994	MDF	Boross; MDF–EKGP–KDNP	34 (1990)
2		Pál Vastagh (1946–)	15 July 1994	8 July 1998	MSZP	Horn; MSZP–SZDSZ	35 (1994)
3		Ibolya Dávid (1954–)	8 July 1998	27 May 2002	MDF	Orbán I Fidesz–FKGP–MDF	36 (1998)
4		Péter Bárándy (1949–)	27 May 2002	4 October 2004	Independent	Medgyessy; MSZP–SZDSZ	37 (2002)
4		Péter Bárándy (1949–)	4 October 2004	9 June 2006	Independent	Gyurcsány I MSZP–SZDSZ	37 (2002)
5		József Petrétei (1958–)	4 October 2004	9 June 2006	Independent	Gyurcsány I MSZP–SZDSZ	37 (2002)

== Ministers of Justice and Law Enforcement (2006–2010) ==
=== Hungarian Republic (2006–2010) ===
Parties Independent

No.	Portrait	Name (Birth–Death)	Term of office		Political party	Cabinet	Assembly (Election)
1		József Petrétei (1958–)	9 June 2006	31 May 2007	Independent	Gyurcsány II; MSZP–SZDSZ	38 (2006)
2		Albert Takács (1955–)	31 May 2007	17 February 2008	Independent	Gyurcsány II; MSZP–SZDSZ	38 (2006)
3		Tibor Draskovics (1955–)	17 February 2008	14 April 2009	Independent	Gyurcsány II; MSZP–SZDSZ	38 (2006)
3		Tibor Draskovics (1955–)	14 April 2009	14 December 2009	Independent	Bajnai; MSZP	38 (2006)
4		Imre Forgács (1949–2022)	14 December 2009	29 May 2010	Independent	Bajnai; MSZP	38 (2006)

== Ministers of Public Administration and Justice (2010–2014) ==
=== Hungarian Republic / Hungary (2010–2014) ===
Parties Fidesz

No.	Portrait	Name (Birth–Death)	Term of office		Political party	Cabinet	Assembly (Election)
1		Tibor Navracsics (1966–)	29 May 2010	6 June 2014	Fidesz	Orbán II; Fidesz–KDNP	39 (2010)

== Ministers of Justice (2014–present) ==
=== Hungary (2014–present) ===
Parties FIDESZ Independent

No.	Portrait	Name (Birth–Death)	Term of office		Political party	Cabinet	Assembly (Election)
1		László Trócsányi (1956–)	6 June 2014	18 May 2018	Independent (affiliated with Fidesz)	Orbán III; Fidesz–KDNP	40 (2014)
1		László Trócsányi (1956–)	18 May 2018	30 June 2019	Independent (affiliated with Fidesz)	Orbán IV; Fidesz–KDNP	41 (2018)
2		Judit Varga (1980–)	12 July 2019	24 May 2022	Fidesz	Orbán IV; Fidesz–KDNP	41 (2018)
2		Judit Varga (1980–)	24 May 2022	31 August 2023	Fidesz	Orbán V Fidesz–KDNP	42 (2022)
3		Bence Tuzson (1972–)	1 August 2023	12 May 2026	Fidesz	Orbán V Fidesz–KDNP	42 (2022)
4	Márta Görög in 2026	Márta Görög (1975–)	13 May 2026	Incumbent	Independent (affiliated with TISZA)	Magyar; TISZA	43 (2026)

== See also ==
- List of heads of state of Hungary
- List of prime ministers of Hungary
- Politics of Hungary

Cabinet ministers

- Minister of Agriculture (Hungary)
- Minister of Civilian Intelligence Services (Hungary)
- Minister of Croatian Affairs of Hungary
- Minister of Defence (Hungary)
- Minister of Education (Hungary)
- Minister of Finance (Hungary)
- Minister of Foreign Affairs (Hungary)
- Minister of the Interior (Hungary)
- Minister of Public Works and Transport (Hungary)
