= Rubinek =

Rubinek is a surname. Notable people with the surname include:

- Gyula Rubinek (1865–1922), Hungarian politician
- Saul Rubinek (born 1948), Canadian actor
