= Ferenc Hegedűs =

Ferenc Hegedűs may refer to:

- Ferenc Hegedűs (fencer) (born 1959), Hungarian fencer
- Ferenc Hegedűs (politician) (1856–1909), Hungarian politician, Minister of Finance in 1906
