= György Bartal =

Hungarian politician (1820–1875)

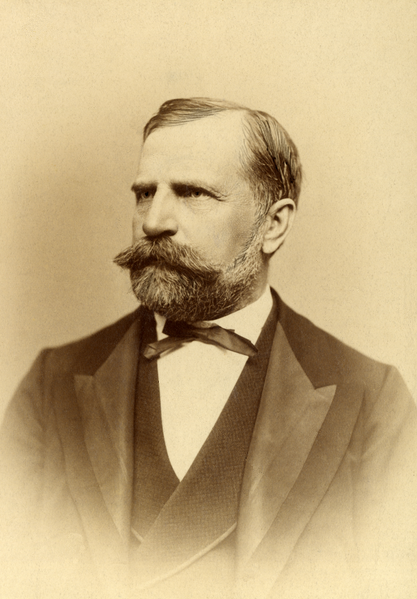

Minister of Agriculture, Industry and Trade of Hungary
- In office 21 March 1874 – 1 March 1875
- Preceded by: József Zichy
- Succeeded by: Lajos Simonyi

Personal details
- Born: 20 September 1820 Kráľovičove Kračany, Austrian Empire
- Died: 25 October 1875 (aged 55) Fadd, Austria-Hungary
- Party: Deák Party, Liberal Party
- Profession: politician

György Bartal the Younger de Beleháza (20 September 1820 – 25 October 1875) was a Hungarian politician, who served as Minister of Agriculture, Industry and Trade between 1874 and 1875. His father was the legal historian Sr. György Bartal.

Political offices
Preceded by József Zichy	Minister of Agriculture, Industry and Trade; 1874–1875	Succeeded by Lajos Simonyi
