= Nyisztor =

Nyisztor is a Hungarian surname. Notable people with this surname include:

- Alexandru Nyisztor (born 1979), Romanian fencer
- György Nyisztor (1869–1956), Hungarian politician
- János Nyisztor (1887–1924), Hungarian gymnast
