= Artúr Feilitzsch =

Hungarian politician (1859–1925)

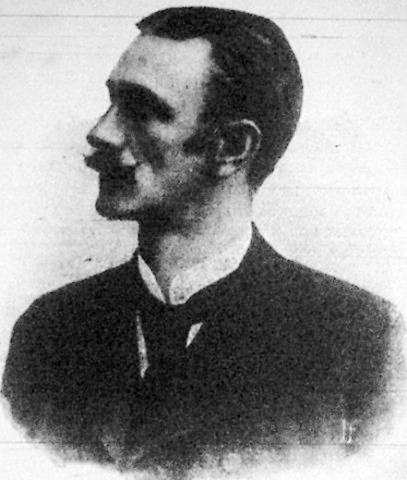

Minister of Agriculture of Hungary
- In office 18 October 1905 – 8 April 1906
- Prime Minister: Géza Fejérváry
- Preceded by: Endre György
- Succeeded by: Ignác Darányi

Personal details
- Born: 18 February 1859 Törökkanizsa, Kingdom of Hungary
- Died: 15 June 1925 (aged 66) Ernei, Kingdom of Romania
- Party: Liberal Party
- Profession: politician

Baron Artúr Feilitzsch (18 February 1859 – 15 June 1925) was a Hungarian politician, who served as Minister of Agriculture between 1905 and 1906.

Political offices
Preceded by Endre György	Minister of Agriculture; 1905–1906	Succeeded by Ignác Darányi
