= János Kintzig =

Hungarian politician

Minister of Agriculture of the Counter-Revolutionary Government of the Hungarian Soviet Republic
- In office 5 May 1919 – 12 July 1919
- Succeeded by: Loránd Győry

Personal details
- Political party: Independent
- Profession: politician

János Kintzig was a Hungarian politician, who served as Minister of Agriculture in the Counter-revolutionary Government of Arad and Szeged during the Hungarian Soviet Republic.

Political offices
Preceded by -	Minister of Agriculture of the Counter-Government; 1919	Succeeded by Loránd Győry
