= Pyiterfolvo =

Village in Zakarpattia Oblast, Ukraine

Piyterfolvo Пийтерфолво Tiszapéterfalva · Petriș
- Village
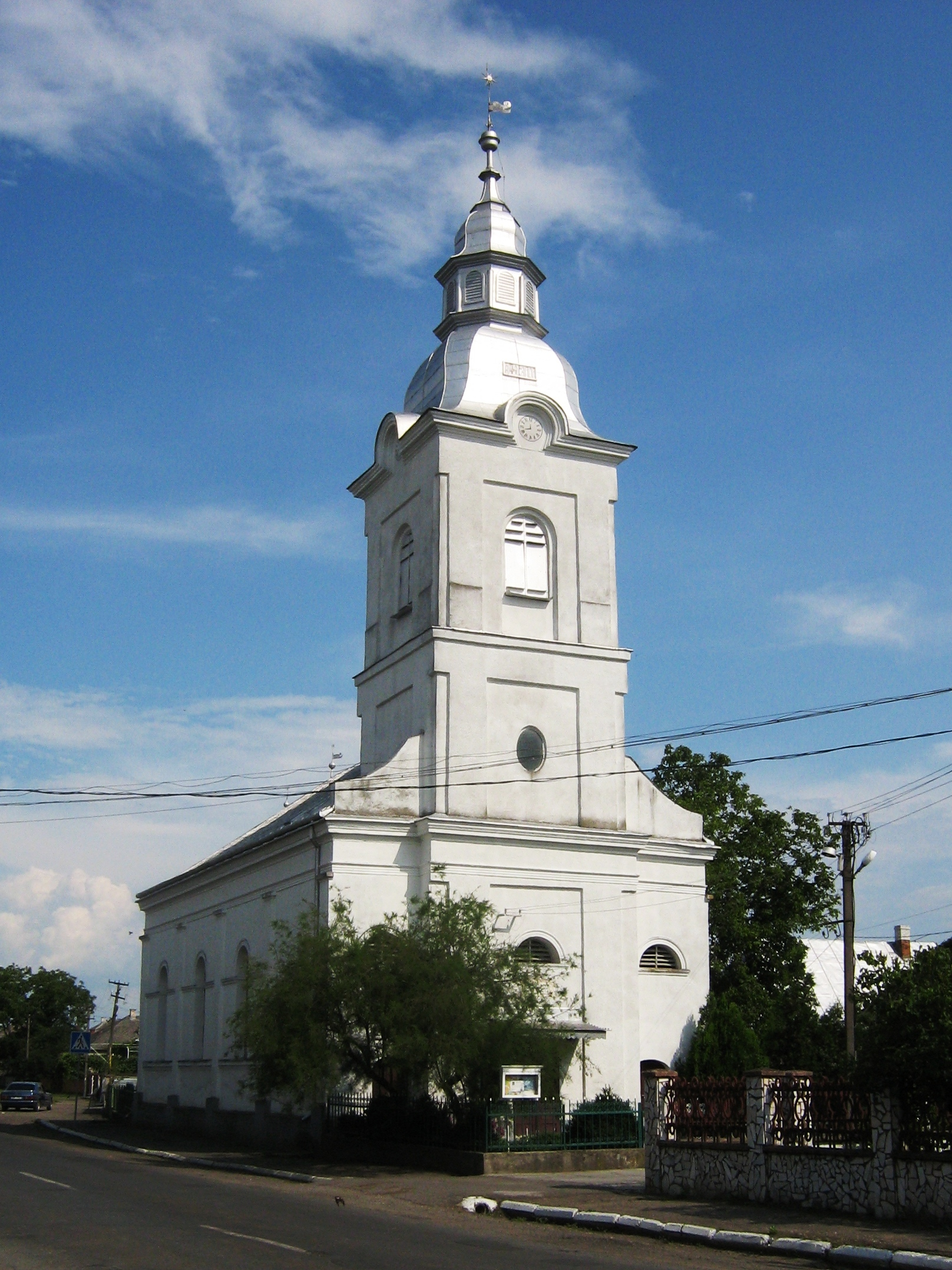
- The Continental Reformed church in Piyterfolvo
- Interactive map of Piyterfolvo
- Location of Piyterfolvo in Zakarpattia Oblast Location of Piyterfolvo in Ukraine
- Coordinates: 48°03′42″N 22°56′03″E
- Country: Ukraine
- Oblast: Zakarpattia Oblast
- Raion: Berehove Raion
- Established: c. 1500

Population (2023)
  - Total: 2,016

Piyterfolvo (Ukrainian: Пийтерфолво; until 1985 Petrove (Ukrainian: Петрове); Hungarian: Tiszapéterfalva; Romanian: Petriș) is a village in Berehove Raion, Zakarpattia Oblast, Ukraine. It is the administrative centre of Piyterfolvo rural hromada, one of the hromadas of Ukraine. Piyterfolvo's population is 2,016 (as of 2023).

== History ==
The village of Pyiterfolvo was founded circa 1500. According to a local legend, the village was separated from Tysobyken after a Hungarian king divided the lands making up the present-day villages among his sons; Pyiterfolvo was named for the son who inherited it, Peter, while Tysobyken was named for the cultivation of beans on the land. In the present day, Pyiterfolvo's primary attraction is its art gallery, housed in the former summer palace of Endre György.

== Demographics ==
According to the 2001 Ukrainian census, Pyiterfolvo has a population of 2,064. Of this population, 96.08% speaks Hungarian, 3.47% speaks Ukrainian, 0.30% speaks Russian, and 0.05% each speak German and Romani.
