= Darányi =

Darányi is a Hungarian surname. Notable people with the surname include:

- Ignác Darányi (1849–1927), Hungarian politician
- József Darányi (1905–1990), Hungarian shot putter
- Kálmán Darányi (1886–1939), Hungarian politician
