= István Szabó de Nagyatád =

Hungarian politician (1863–1924)

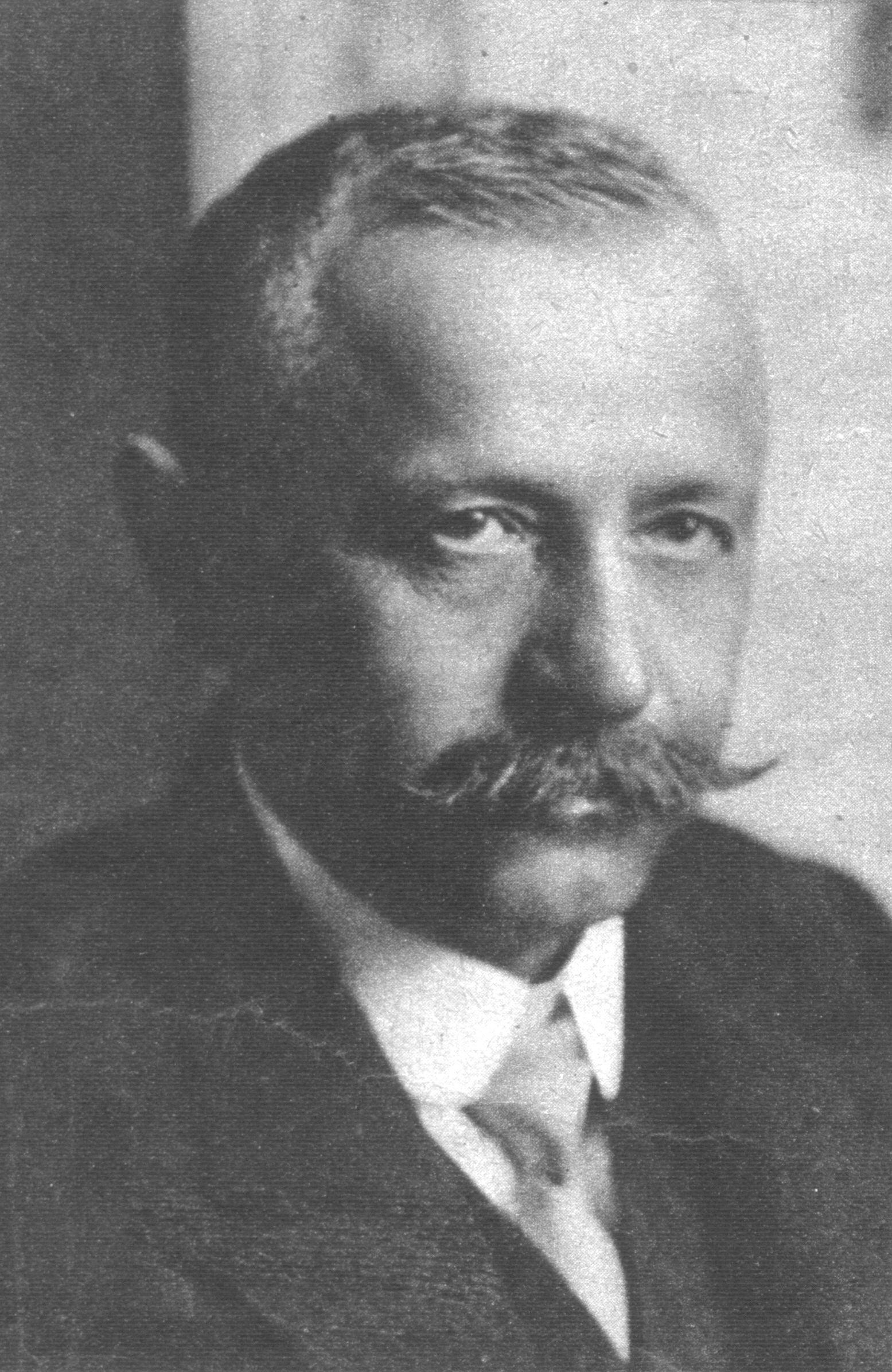

Minister of Agriculture of Hungary
- In office 15 August 1919 – 27 August 1919
- Preceded by: Loránd Győry
- Succeeded by: Gyula Rubinek
- In office 15 August 1920 – 3 December 1921
- Preceded by: Gyula Rubinek
- Succeeded by: János Mayer
- In office 16 June 1922 – 14 October 1924
- Preceded by: János Mayer
- Succeeded by: István Bethlen

Personal details
- Born: 17 September 1863 Erdőcsokonya, Kingdom of Hungary, Austrian Empire
- Died: 31 October 1924 (aged 61) Erdőcsokonya, Hungary
- Party: National Independence Agrarian Party of 48, National Smallholders and Agrarian Workers Party (OKGFP), Unity Party
- Profession: politician

István Szabó de Nagyatád (17 September 1863 – 31 October 1924) was a Hungarian politician, who served as Minister of Agriculture three times: in 1919, between 1920 and 1921 and from 1922 to 1924.

He was born into a Hungarian Calvinist family in Erdőcsokonya (now: Csokonyavisonta after the union with Somogyvisonta). After collecting possessions he was elected municipal judge. From 1904 he was active in the assembly of Somogy County's municipal committee. He became a member of the House of Representatives in 1908, after he won the elections against the Independence Party's candidate in the Nagyatád constituency (he obtained his title of nagyatádi then). He was a representative with the program of Alliance of the Smallholders in Somogy County (local organization). In his first speech he asked the MPs that the agrarian worker people must be called smallholder and not as peasant, because the peasant word had a pejorative sound in Transdanubia. As opposed to the socialists (András Liker Áchim) and the civil radicals, he was a supporter of a moderate agrarian reform which was acceptable to the great landowners and the aristocracy too. His ambitions then included the creation of universal suffrage. He criticized the unfair tax system, the function of the fideicommissum familiae. He promoted the co-operatives' foundation, the settlements and the voluntary and partial parceling out of the large estates. He stayed moderate on civil questions and he made the official Hungarian power point of view his own on the nationality question.

He won the wealthier peasantry's support, primarily in Transdanubia, with his political performance and the agrarians considered him as their possible ally. In 1909, he founded the National Independence Agrarian Party of 48 in Szentgál. He became a parliamentary representative of his party in the next year (there were two other politicians who gained a seat with the colors of Szabó's association). He served as minister without portfolio managing of the land reform in the Dénes Berinkey cabinet (1919). After the fall of the Hungarian Soviet Republic he was the most popular politician in Hungary, so Miklós Horthy invited him to Siófok where the new system was formed. He formed his party with the name of National Smallholders and Agrarian Workers Party (OKGFP) in January 1919, which won the next parliamentary election. Gyula Rubinek got him to do unification with the United Smallholders and Agrarian Workers Party which led by István Szabó de Sokorópátka. Then he took on the submitting of the land reform law proposal drawn up by Rubinek. The agrarian press made him a scapegoat in the course of the debate of the law. The landowners tried to sabotage the execution of the new law (1920 Act XXXVI), as a result of that finally 400,000 claimants secured altogether on average a hectare of soil each. Seeing the failure of the execution he put a modifier proposal on to the law, but because of this at from the previous conflicts, denouncing got into sharper the assault fire of attacks. The afforestation of the Great Hungarian Plain, drainage and watering programs began under his ministry, co-operatives and winter agricultural schools came into existence.

In 1921, in the interest of the reduction of the agricultural raw material deficiency, the government bound the exportation of the commodities like this to an export permit and ordered the right of the expense of the permits for the Ministry of Agriculture. This measure provided an opportunity for the corruption, in which everyone more important member of the government practically, so Nagyatád was also affected was, who became exposed by István Bethlen's political endeavours, first of all the party union idea which taking aim the annihilation of the Smallholders' Party. Onto the proposal of Tibor Eckhardt, the Prime Minister's press chief Bethlen flipped the corruption cases out on the way of the media directing the suspicion onto Szabó de Nagyatád and onto his environment. Because of the cumulative pressure he, giving up the program of the secret franchise, obliged to merging his party with the National Centre Party, so he became the first chairman of the newly formed Unity Party.

As his secretary, Lajos Eskütt who had a major role in the corruption cases, placed an inculpatory statement upon him, he resigned from the ministerial position. Szabó returned to his birthplace. The looking for his truth and fearing for his political career Eskütt rejected the offered secret agreements and emigration opportunity and he required rehabilitation and a mandate instead of these things. Because of this Szabó and Bethlen prosecuted him (libel trial). Szabó would be one of the crown witnesses but before the trial he died between suspicious circumstances. Miklós Horthy and István Bethlen also participated in his funeral.

Gyula Gömbös inaugurated the agrarian politician's sculpture in 1932, Budapest. István Szabó de Nagyatád is one of the honorary citizens of Makó.

Political offices
Preceded by Loránd Győry	Minister of Agriculture; 1919	Succeeded by Gyula Rubinek
Preceded by Gyula Rubinek	Minister of Agriculture; 1920–1921	Succeeded by János Mayer
Preceded by János Mayer	Minister of Agriculture; 1922–1924	Succeeded by István Bethlen
