= Lajos Simonyi =

Hungarian politician (1824–1894)

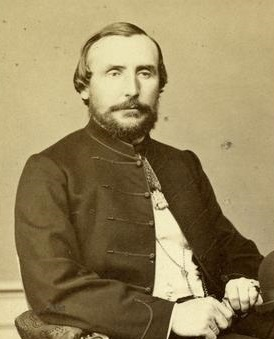

Minister of Agriculture, Industry and Trade of Hungary
- In office 11 March 1875 – 21 August 1876
- Preceded by: György Bartal
- Succeeded by: Ágoston Trefort

Personal details
- Born: 13 April 1824; Ternopil, Austrian Empire
- Died: 12 December 1894 (aged 70); Budapest, Austria-Hungary
- Political party: Left Centre, Liberal Party
- Profession: politician

Baron Lajos Simonyi de Barbács et Vitézvár (13 April 1824 – 12 December 1894) was a Hungarian politician, who served as Minister of Agriculture, Industry and Trade between 1875 and 1876. He studied law in Kassa. From 1847 he was a delegate on the Diet in Pest. He participated in the Hungarian Revolution of 1848, he performed courier service besides Artúr Görgey. As a result, he was imprisoned for a short time. Later he was a supporter of László Teleki. Simonyi retired from politics in 1878.

Political offices
Preceded by György Bartal	Minister of Agriculture, Industry and Trade; 1875–1876	Succeeded by Ágoston Trefort
