= Károly Vántus =

Hungarian politician and carpenter

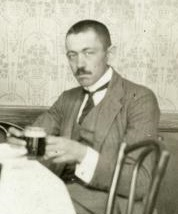

People's Commissar of Agriculture of Hungary
- In office 21 March 1919 – 1 August 1919 Serving with Sándor Csizmadia (until 3 April) György Nyisztor (until 24 July) and Jenő Hamburger
- Preceded by: Barna Buza
- Succeeded by: József Takács

Personal details
- Born: 20 February 1879 Nagyvárad, Kingdom of Hungary, Austria-Hungary
- Died: 16 June 1927 (aged 48) Moscow, Soviet Union
- Resting place: Novodevichy Cemetery
- Party: MSZDP, KMP
- Profession: politician, carpenter

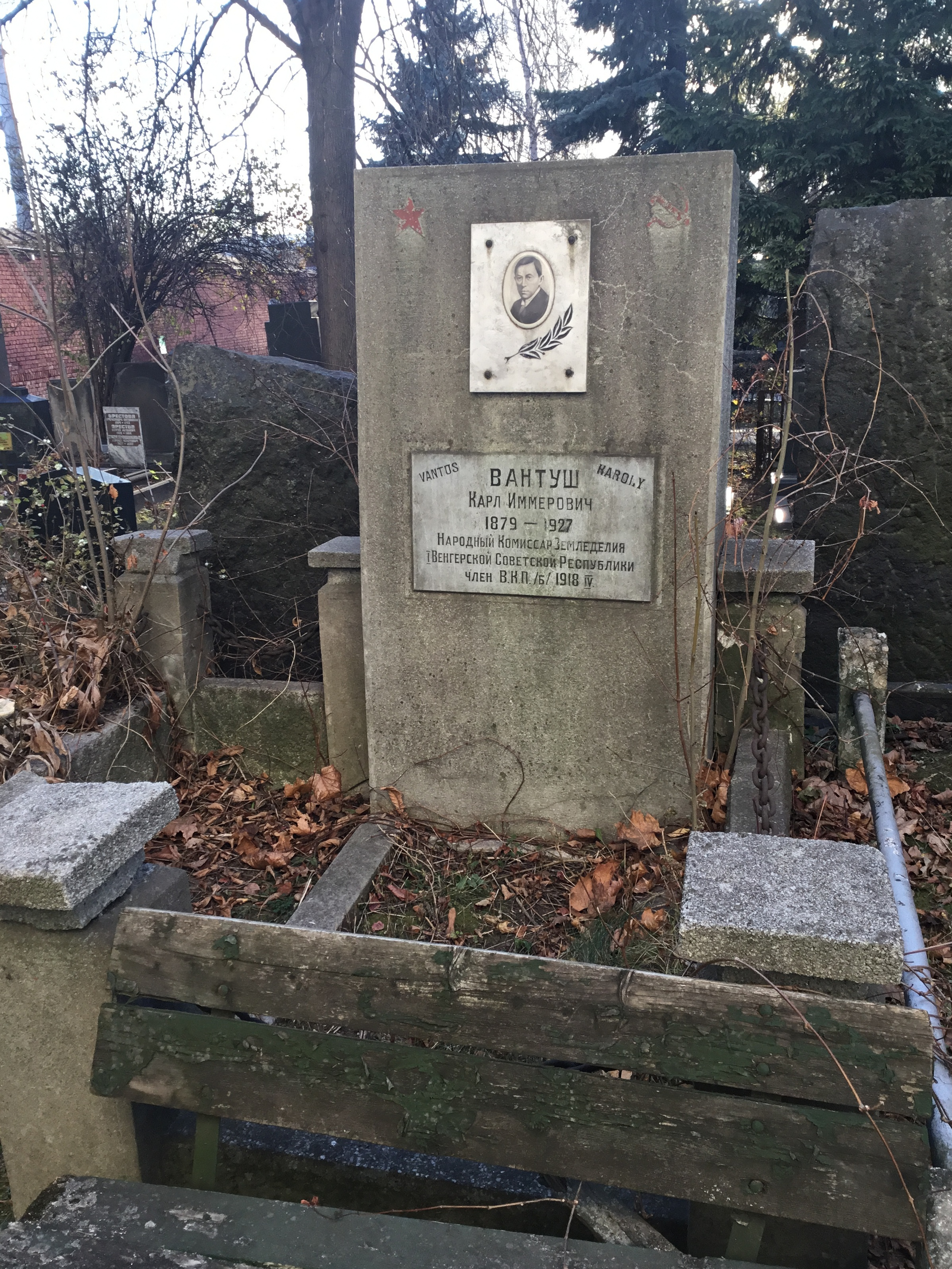
Károly Vántus grave in Novodevichy Cemetery (Moscow)

Károly Vántus (20 February 1879 – 16 June 1927) was a Hungarian politician and carpenter, who served as People's Commissar of Agriculture during the Hungarian Soviet Republic. He was a founding member of the Communist Party of Hungary. He died in the Soviet Union.

Political offices
Preceded by Barna Buza	People's Commissar of Agriculture served alongside Sándor Csizmadia (until 3 April 1919), György Nyisztor (until 24 July 1919) and Jenő Hamburger; 1919	Succeeded by József Takács
