= András Vonza =

Hungarian politician (born 1955)

Minister of Agriculture and Rural Development of Hungary
- In office 26 March 2001 – 27 May 2002
- Preceded by: Imre Boros
- Succeeded by: Imre Németh

Personal details
- Born: 28 July 1955 (age 70); Nagykálló, People's Republic of Hungary
- Political party: FKGP
- Children: 2
- Profession: vet, politician

András Vonza (born 28 July 1955) is a Hungarian vet and politician, who served as Minister of Agriculture and Rural Development between 2001 and 2002.

Political offices
Preceded by Imre Boros	Minister of Agriculture and Rural Development; 2001–2002	Succeeded by Imre Németh
