= József Torgyán =

Hungarian lawyer and politician (1932–2017)

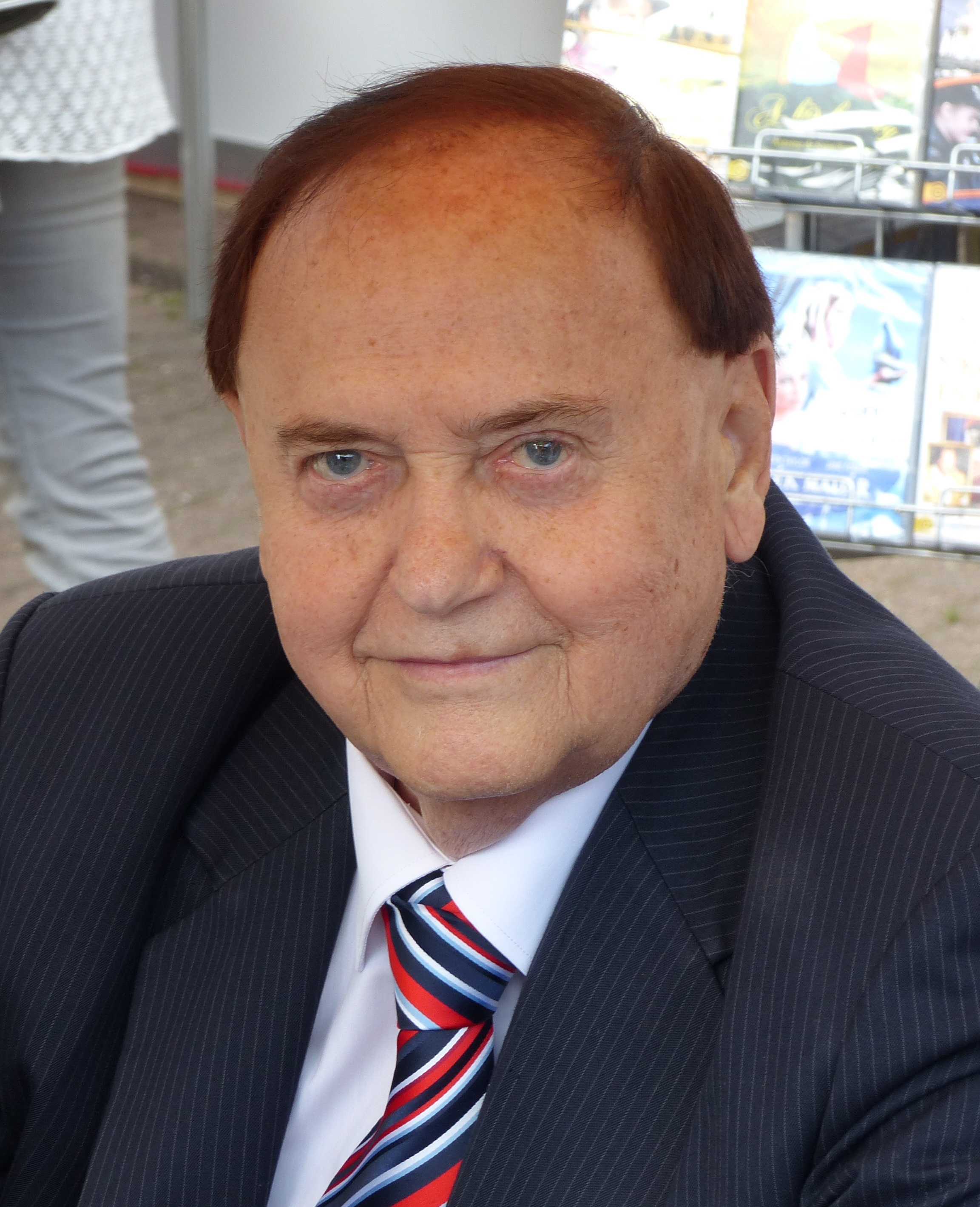
- Torgyán in 2016

Minister of Agriculture and Rural Development
- In office 8 July 1998 – 15 February 2001
- Prime Minister: Viktor Orbán
- Preceded by: Frigyes Nagy (Minister of Agriculture)
- Succeeded by: Imre Boros

Personal details
- Born: 16 November 1932 Mátészalka, Hungary
- Died: 22 January 2017 (aged 84) Budapest, Hungary
- Party: FKGP
- Spouse: Mária Cseh
- Children: Attila
- Profession: Lawyer; politician

József Torgyán (16 November 1932 − 22 January 2017) was a Hungarian lawyer and politician, chairman of the Independent Smallholders' Party (1991−2002), Deputy Prime Minister and Minister of Agriculture and Rural Development (1998−2001) in the Government of Viktor Orbán.

== Biography ==
Between 1951-1955 he studied at the Faculty of Law of the Eötvös Loránd University in Budapest (ELTE). He took part in the Hungarian Revolution of 1956. After graduation, he worked as a lawyer, since political activity was repressed. In 1988 he was among the founders of the Independent Smallholders Party. In 1990 he received the first seat in the National Assembly (re-elected in 1994 and 1998).

After Fidesz had won the first round of the parliamentary elections in 1998, the Smallholders Party concluded an alliance with Fidesz, as a result of which center right parties obtained a majority in the National Assembly. The Smallholders Party, together with the Hungarian Democratic Forum (MDF) became part of the ruling coalition that was led by Fidesz. In this government Torgyán held the position of deputy prime minister and minister for agriculture. In 2000 he was one of the candidates for the office of President of Hungary. In the 2002 elections the party received no seats and found itself on the margins of politics. In 2006, Torgyán became chairman of the Hungarian Torgyán Renewal Movement.

== Personal life and death ==
He married Mária Cseh in 1959, who was an actress in the National Theatre of Pécs. Their son, Atilla is an editor. He died on 22 January 2017 in Budapest.

== Books ==
- Antalltól Orbánig (2005)
- Kereszténység az ezer vallás világában 2006
- Humor a házban (2007)
- Száll a turul fészkére (2016)

Political offices
| Preceded by Lajos Für | Leader of the Opposition; 1996–1997 | Succeeded by Viktor Orbán |
| Preceded by Frigyes Nagy | Minister of Agriculture and Rural Development; 1998–2001 | Succeeded by Imre Boros |
Party political offices
| Preceded by Ferenc József Nagy | Chairman of the Independent Smallholders' Party; 1991–2002 | Succeeded by Miklós Réti |
