= Barna Buza =

Hungarian politician and jurist

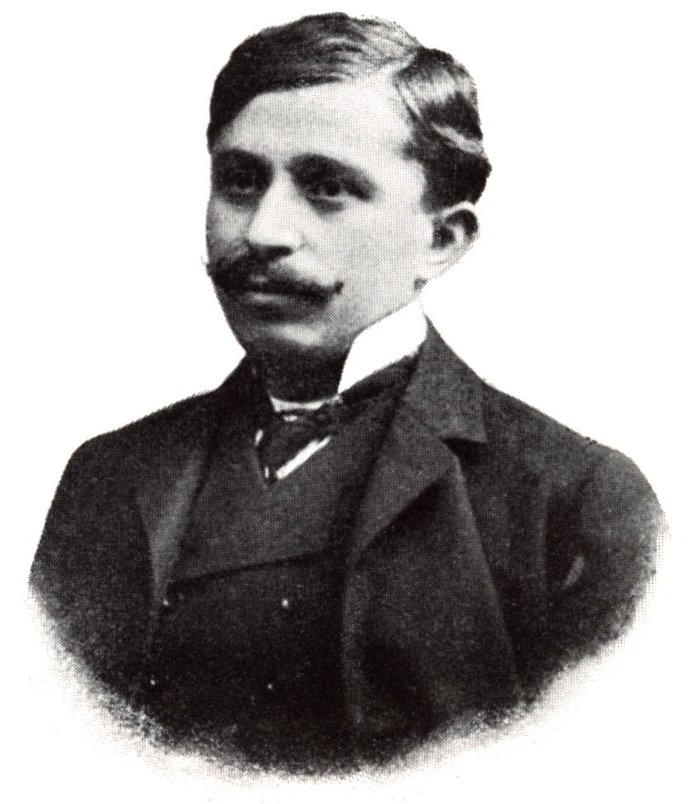

Minister of Agriculture of Hungary
- In office 31 October 1918 – 21 March 1919
- Prime Minister: Márton Lovászy; János Vass
- Preceded by: Béla Serényi
- Succeeded by: Sándor Csizmadia; György Nyisztor; Jenő Hamburger; Károly Vántus

Personal details
- Born: 1 January 1873 Tolcsva, Kingdom of Hungary, Austria-Hungary
- Died: 2 May 1944 (aged 71) Budapest, Kingdom of Hungary
- Party: Independence Party, United Party of Independence and of 1848 (Károlyi Party)
- Profession: politician, jurist

Barna Buza (1 January 1873 – 2 May 1944) was a Hungarian politician and jurist, who served as Minister of Agriculture from 1918 to 1919 and as interim Minister of Justice for a few days in 1918.

He worked as an editor of the Felsőmagyarországi Hírlap from 1897. He was a member of the House of Representatives between 1905 and 1910. Later he functioned as editor of the Budapest (from 1906) and Magyarország (from 1908) newspapers. He went with Mihály Károlyi to the politician's country tour in the United States in 1914.

From 31 October 1918 he served as Minister of Agriculture, he represented Károlyi's land reform ideas. He created the "People's Law" (1919: 36. tc.), which was about the land distribution. As acting justice minister he took part in the foundation of the Defence League of the Hungarian Territorial Integrity with a promotion.

During the Hungarian Soviet Republic he published anti-communist and revisionist works. From 1921 he practiced as a lawyer in the capital city. He wrote many poems and literature works using the pseudonym of Krónikás (Chronicler).

Political offices
Preceded by Béla Serényi	Minister of Agriculture; 1918–1919	Succeeded by Sándor Csizmadia; György Nyisztor; Jenő Hamburger; Károly Vántus
Preceded by Gusztáv Tőry	Minister of Justice; Acting; 1918	Succeeded by Dénes Berinkey
