= Imre Németh (politician) =

Hungarian agrarian engineer and politician

Minister of Agriculture and Rural Development of Hungary
- In office 27 May 2002 – 1 May 2005
- Preceded by: András Vonza
- Succeeded by: József Gráf

Personal details
- Born: 14 April 1955 (age 70) Vasvár, People's Republic of Hungary
- Party: MSZMP, Agrarian Alliance
- Profession: politician

Imre Németh (born 14 April 1955) is a Hungarian agrarian engineer and politician, who served as Minister of Agriculture and Rural Development between 2002 and 2005. In the second cabinet of Ferenc Gyurcsány he served as state secretary of the Prime Minister's Office from 2007 to 2008.

Political offices
Preceded by András Vonza	Minister of Agriculture and Rural Development; 2002–2005	Succeeded by József Gráf
