= László Lakos =

Hungarian politician (born 1945)

Minister of Agriculture of Hungary
- In office 15 July 1994 – 16 December 1996
- Prime Minister: Gyula Horn
- Preceded by: János Szabó
- Succeeded by: Frigyes Nagy

Personal details
- Born: 31 August 1945 (age 81) Furta, Kingdom of Hungary
- Party: MSZMP, MSZP
- Profession: veterinarian, politician

László Lakos (born 31 August 1945) is a Hungarian veterinarian and former politician, who served as Minister of Agriculture between 1994 and 1996.

Political offices
Preceded by János Szabó	Minister of Agriculture; 1994–1996	Succeeded by Frigyes Nagy
