= Sándor Fazekas =

Hungarian jurist and politician

Sándor Fazekas MP
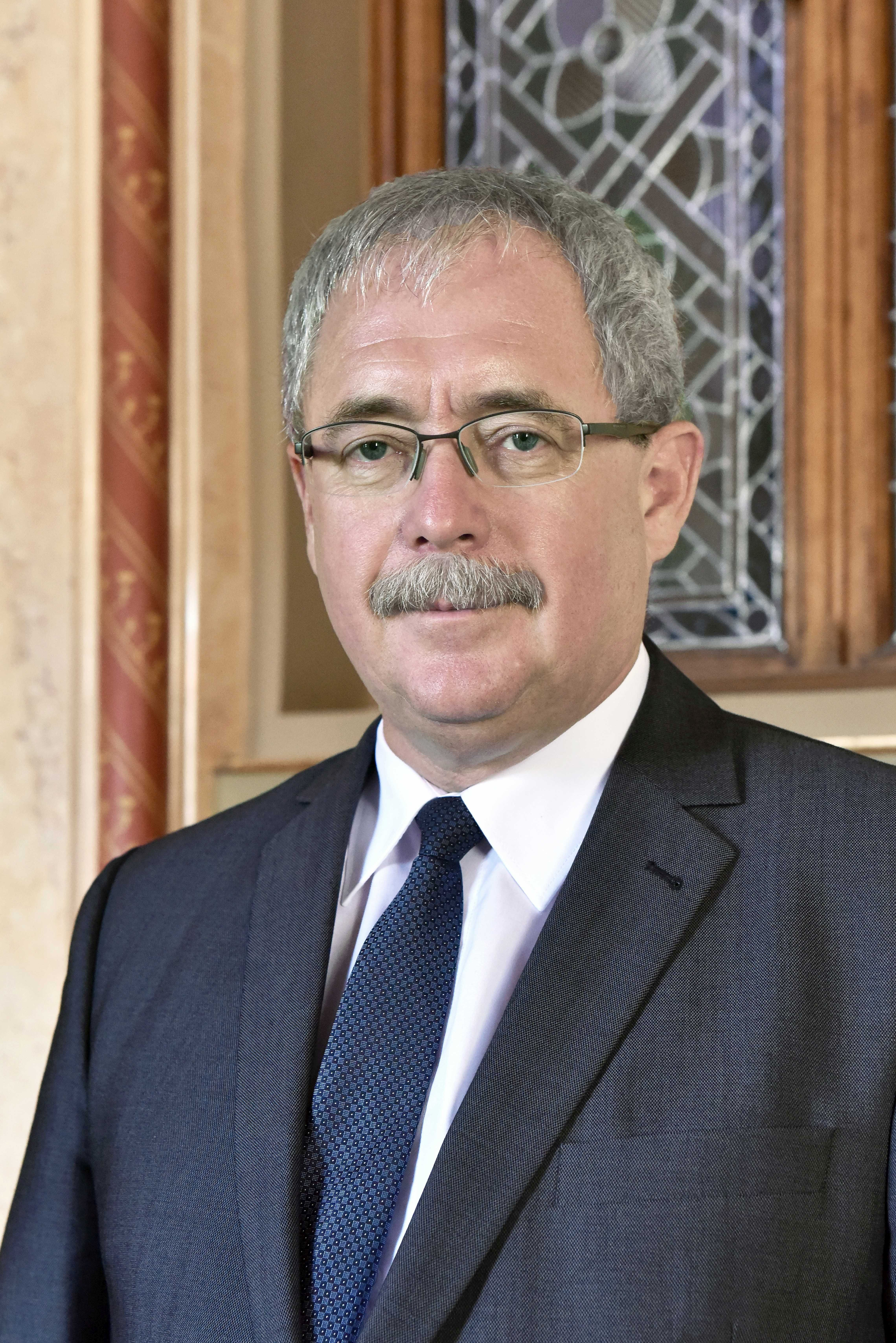

Minister of Agriculture
- In office 6 June 2014 – 18 May 2018
- Prime Minister: Viktor Orbán
- Preceded by: himself (Rural Development)
- Succeeded by: István Nagy

Minister of Rural Development
- In office 29 May 2010 – 6 June 2014
- Prime Minister: Viktor Orbán
- Preceded by: József Gráf (Agriculture and Rural Development)
- Succeeded by: himself (Agriculture)

Member of the National Assembly
- In office 16 May 2006 – 8 May 2026
- In office 18 June 1998 – 14 May 2002

Personal details
- Born: 3 May 1963 (age 63) Karcag, Hungary
- Party: Fidesz
- Spouse: Irén Kardalus
- Children: Sándor; Bence
- Profession: jurist, politician

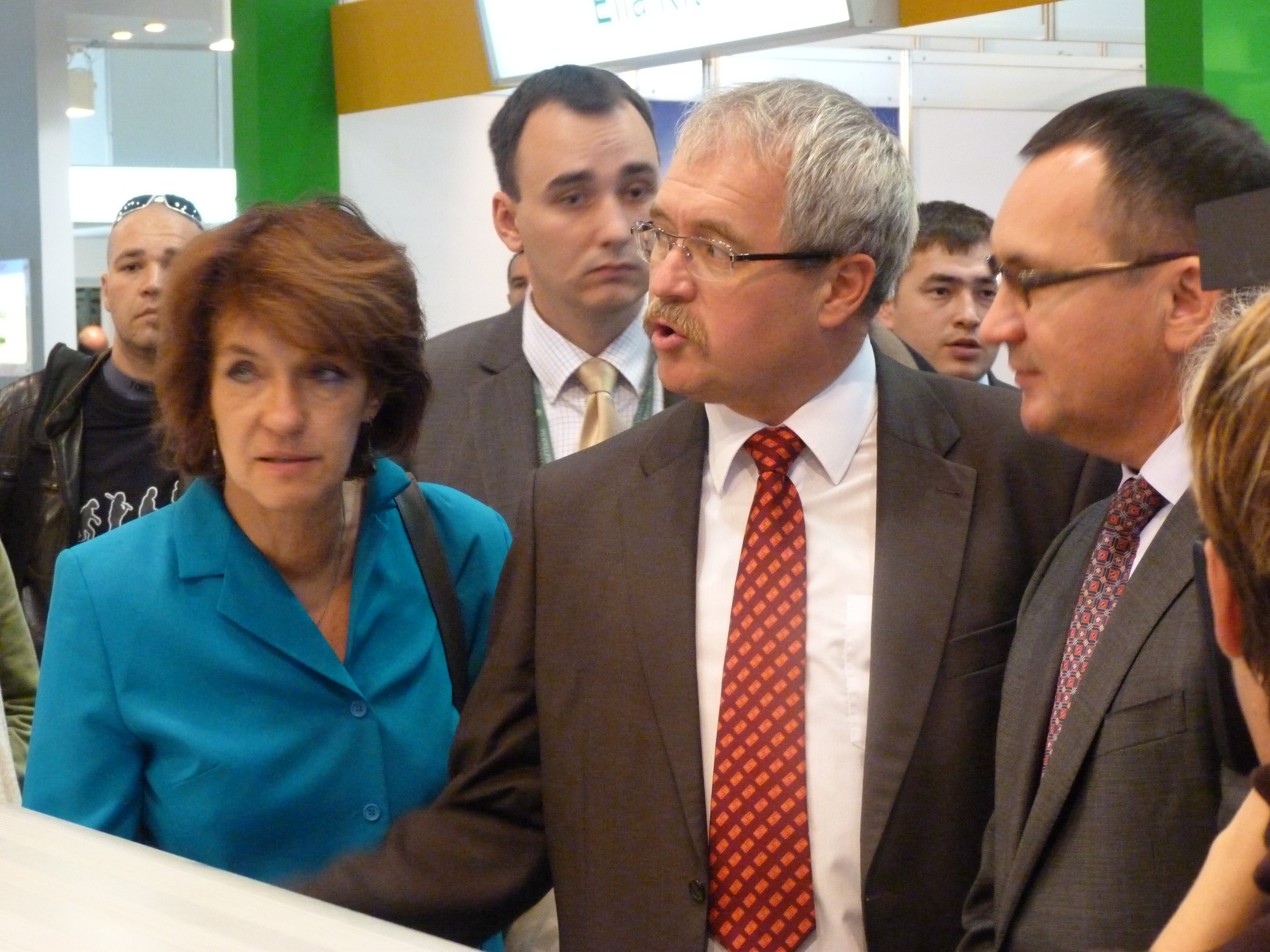
Fazekas (center) with his Russian colleague Nikolay Fyodorov (right) - OMÉK, 2013

Sándor Fazekas (born 3 May 1963) is a Hungarian jurist and politician. He served as Minister of Rural Development, then Minister of Agriculture from 2010 to 2018, in the second and third cabinets of Prime Minister Viktor Orbán. He served as mayor of his hometown, Karcag between 1990 and 2010.

== Early life and education ==
He attended elementary school in Kenderes and secondary school in Kisújszállás. He graduated cum laude as a lawyer from the Faculty of Law of the University of Szeged. After graduation, he worked as a legal adviser for SZIM Karcag Machice Factory joint-stock company.

== Political career ==
He served as mayor of Karcag between 1990 and 2010. He was a member of the General Assembly of Jász-Nagykun-Szolnok County between 1994 and 1998 and since 2002 as a faction leader of the Fidesz. He was working as a Member of Parliament and a deputy parliamentary group leader of the Fidesz between 1998 and 2002. He was a vice-president of local government section of the party. He also functioned as a representative of the local government of Karcag, working in an individual constituency. He was elected MP from the party's Jász-Nagykun-Szolnok County Regional List in the 2006 parliamentary election. He was a member of the Committee on Budget, Finance and Audit Office. He was elected MP from Jász-Nagykun-Szolnok County Regional List again in the 2010 parliamentary election.

=== Minister of Rural Development ===
During his ministerial term, a new land law was developed and passed on 21 June 2013. Pro-government MPs passed a controversial new land law amid raucous protests in Parliament and the resignation of József Ángyán, a high-profile lawmaker from the governing party. The protesting MPs, led by Jobbik head Gábor Vona, were ordered by Deputy Speaker of Parliament János Latorcai to vacate the lectern, but they refused, leading to a delay in the session and the exclusion of the protesters from the vote.

As the votes were being counted, Jobbik lawmakers shouted slogans including "Traitors" and "No, no, never," the latter a traditional protest chant against the post-World War I Treaty of Trianon. By contrast, Antal Rogán, leader of the Fidesz parliamentary group, called the new legislation a "historic step in ensuring protection for Hungarian land and the interests of Hungarian farmers."

== Personal life ==
He is married. His wife is Irén Kardalus. They have two sons, Sándor and Bence.

== Sources ==
- MTI ki kicsoda 2009, Magyar Távirati Iroda Zrt., Budapest 2008, 311. old. ISSN 1787-288X
- Fazekas Sándor országgyűlési adatlapja
- Cikk az Index.hu honlapján

Political offices
Preceded by József Gráf	Minister of Rural Development; 2010–2014	Succeeded by himself as Minister of Agriculture
Preceded by himself as Minister of Rural Development	Minister of Agriculture; 2014–2018	Succeeded by István Nagy
National Assembly of Hungary
Preceded by Csaba Hende	Deputy Speaker for Legislation; 2025–2026	Succeeded by Richárd Rák
