= József Takács (politician) =

Hungarian politician (1884–1961)

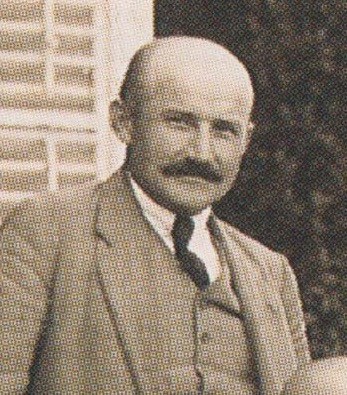

Minister of Agriculture of Hungary
- In office 1 August 1919 – 6 August 1919
- Preceded by: Jenő Hamburger; Károly Vántus
- Succeeded by: Loránd Győry

Personal details
- Born: 17 March 1884 Orosháza, Kingdom of Hungary, Austria-Hungary
- Died: 2 February 1961 (aged 76) Budapest, People's Republic of Hungary
- Political party: MSZDP
- Profession: politician

József Takács (17 March 1884 – 2 February 1961) was a Hungarian politician, who served as Minister of Agriculture for few days in 1919.

Political offices
Preceded by Jenő Hamburger; Károly Vántus	Minister of Agriculture; 1919	Succeeded by Loránd Győry
