= János Mayer =

Hungarian politician (1871–1955)

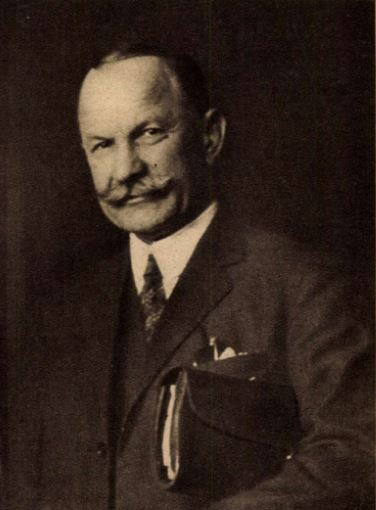

Minister of Agriculture of Hungary
- In office 3 December 1921 – 16 June 1922
- Preceded by: István Szabó de Nagyatád
- Succeeded by: István Szabó de Nagyatád
- In office 15 November 1924 – 24 August 1931
- Preceded by: István Bethlen
- Succeeded by: Béla Ivády

Personal details
- Born: 7 June 1871 Kompolt, Kingdom of Hungary, Austria-Hungary
- Died: 23 December 1955 (aged 84) Kompolt, People's Republic of Hungary
- Political party: National Smallholders and Agrarian Workers Party (OKGFP), Unity Party
- Profession: politician

János Mayer (7 June 1871 – 23 December 1955) was a Hungarian politician, who served as Minister of Agriculture twice: between 1921-1922 and 1924–1931. He farmed on his parents' possession after the accomplishment of his studies. He was already engaged in the smallholder movements in his early years. With István Szabó de Nagyatád he founded the Smallholders Party in Heves County. He became a member of the Diet of Hungary in 1914, representing Kápolna and his party. He was appointed secretary of state of the Ministry of Food in January 1919, but he resigned before the establishing of the Hungarian Soviet Republic.

He was a minister without portfolio in the István Friedrich cabinet. After that István Bethlen appointed him Minister of Food (14 April 1921 - 29 June 1921) and later Minister of Agriculture (3 December 1921 - 16 June 1922). He reappointed agriculture minister in 1924, Mayer held this position until 1931. He was the chairman of the Unity Party until 1 November 1924. After the death of István Szabó de Nagyatád he was the leader of the smallholders group which supported Bethlen.

Political offices
| Preceded by István Szabó de Nagyatád | Minister of Agriculture; 1921–1922 | Succeeded by István Szabó de Nagyatád |
| Preceded by István Bethlen | Minister of Agriculture; 1924–1931 | Succeeded by Béla Ivády |
