= Minister of Agriculture (Hungary) =

Cabinet minister responsible for agriculture in Hungary

The Minister of Agriculture and Food Industry of Hungary (Hungarian: Magyarország földművelésügyi minisztere) is a member of the Hungarian cabinet and the head of the Ministry of Agriculture. The current agriculture minister is Szabolcs Bóna.

The position was called Minister of Agriculture, Industry and Trade (Hungarian: földmívelés-, ipar-, és kereskedelemügyi miniszter) from 1848 to 1889, People's Commissar of Agriculture (Hungarian: földmívelésügyi népbiztos) during the Hungarian Soviet Republic in 1919, Minister of Agriculture and Food (Hungarian: mezőgazdasági és élelmezésügyi miniszter) between 1967 and 1990, Minister of Agriculture and Rural Development (Hungarian: földművelésügyi és vidékfejlesztési miniszter) from 1998 till 2010 and Minister of Rural Development (Hungarian: vidékfejlesztési miniszter) between 2010 and 2014.

== Ministers of Agriculture, Industry and Trade (1848–1889) ==
=== Hungarian Kingdom (1848–1849) ===
Parties Opposition Party

No.	Portrait	Name (Birth–Death)	Term of office		Political party	Cabinet	Assembly (Election)
1		Gábor Klauzál (1804–1866)	23 March 1848	2 October 1848	Opposition Party	Batthyány	Last Diet
1		Gábor Klauzál (1804–1866)	23 March 1848	2 October 1848	Opposition Party	Batthyány	1 (1848)
—		Committee of National Defence	2 October 1848	14 April 1849	—	Committee of National Defence	1 (1848)

=== Hungarian State (1849) ===
Parties Opposition Party

No.	Portrait	Name (Birth–Death)	Term of office		Political party	Cabinet	Assembly (Election)
(—)		Committee of National Defence	14 April 1849	2 May 1849	—	Committee of National Defence	1 (1848)
—		Kázmér Batthyány (1807–1854) acting	2 May 1849	11 August 1849	Opposition Party	Szemere	1 (1848)

After the collapse of the Hungarian Revolution of 1848, the Hungarian Kingdom became an integral part of the Austrian Empire until 1867, when dual Austro-Hungarian Monarchy was created.

=== Hungarian Kingdom (1867–1889) ===
Parties Deák Party/Liberal Party

No.	Portrait	Name (Birth–Death)	Term of office		Political party	Cabinet	Assembly (Election)
2		István Gorove (1819–1881)	20 February 1867	23 May 1870	Deák Party	Andrássy; DP	3 (1865)
2		István Gorove (1819–1881)	20 February 1867	23 May 1870	Deák Party	Andrássy; DP	4 (1869)
3		József Szlávy (1818–1900)	23 May 1870	14 November 1871	Deák Party	Andrássy; DP	4 (1869)
3		József Szlávy (1818–1900)	14 November 1871	5 December 1872	Deák Party	Lónyay; DP	4 (1869)
3		József Szlávy (1818–1900)	14 November 1871	5 December 1872	Deák Party	Lónyay; DP	5 (1872)
4		József Zichy (1841–1924)	5 December 1872	21 March 1874	Deák Party	Szlávy; DP	5 (1872)
5		György Bartal (1820–1875)	21 March 1874	2 March 1875	Deák Party	Bittó; DP–BK	5 (1872)
6		Lajos Simonyi (1824–1894)	2 March 1875	20 October 1875	Liberal Party	Wenckheim; SZP	5 (1872)
6		Lajos Simonyi (1824–1894)	20 October 1875	21 August 1876	Liberal Party	K. Tisza; SZP	6 (1875)
—		Ágoston Trefort (1817–1888) acting	21 August 1876	4 December 1878	Liberal Party	K. Tisza; SZP	6 (1875)
—		Ágoston Trefort (1817–1888) acting	21 August 1876	4 December 1878	Liberal Party	K. Tisza; SZP	7 (1878)
7		Gábor Kemény (1830–1888)	4 December 1878	12 October 1882	Liberal Party	K. Tisza; SZP	7 (1878)
7		Gábor Kemény (1830–1888)	4 December 1878	12 October 1882	Liberal Party	K. Tisza; SZP	8 (1881)
8		Pál Széchenyi (1838–1901)	12 October 1882	8 April 1889	Liberal Party	K. Tisza; SZP	8 (1881)
8		Pál Széchenyi (1838–1901)	12 October 1882	8 April 1889	Liberal Party	K. Tisza; SZP	9 (1884)
8		Pál Széchenyi (1838–1901)	12 October 1882	8 April 1889	Liberal Party	K. Tisza; SZP	10 (1887)
9		Gyula Szapáry (1832–1905)	8 April 1889	15 June 1889	Liberal Party	K. Tisza; SZP	10 (1887)

== Ministers of Agriculture (1889–1919) ==
=== Hungarian Kingdom (1889–1918) ===
Parties Deák Party/Liberal Party/National Party of Work National Constitution Party F48P/F48P–Károlyi Constitution Party of '48 National Independence Agrarian Party of '48 (O48FGP) Independent

No.	Portrait	Name (Birth–Death)	Term of office		Political party	Cabinet	Assembly (Election)
(9)		Gyula Szapáry (1832–1905)	15 June 1889	15 March 1890	Liberal Party	K. Tisza; SZP	10 (1887)
10		András Bethlen (1847–1898)	15 March 1890	17 November 1892	Liberal Party	Szapáry; SZP	10 (1887)
10		András Bethlen (1847–1898)	15 March 1890	17 November 1892	Liberal Party	Szapáry; SZP	11 (1892)
10		András Bethlen (1847–1898)	17 November 1892	10 June 1894	Liberal Party	Wekerle I SZP	11 (1892)
—		Géza Fejérváry (1833–1914) acting	10 June 1894	16 July 1894	Independent	Wekerle I SZP	11 (1892)
11		Andor Festetics (1843–1930)	16 July 1894	15 January 1895	Liberal Party	Wekerle I SZP	11 (1892)
11		Andor Festetics (1843–1930)	15 January 1895	2 November 1895	Liberal Party	Bánffy; SZP	11 (1892)
12		Ignác Darányi (1849–1927); 1st term	2 November 1895	26 February 1899	Liberal Party	Bánffy; SZP	11 (1892)
12		Ignác Darányi (1849–1927); 1st term	2 November 1895	26 February 1899	Liberal Party	Bánffy; SZP	12 (1896)
12		Ignác Darányi (1849–1927); 1st term	26 February 1899	27 June 1903	Liberal Party	Széll; SZP	12 (1896)
12		Ignác Darányi (1849–1927); 1st term	26 February 1899	27 June 1903	Liberal Party	Széll; SZP	13 (1901)
12		Ignác Darányi (1849–1927); 1st term	27 June 1903	3 November 1903	Liberal Party	Khuen-Héderváry I SZP	13 (1901)
13		Béla Tallián (1851–1921)	3 November 1903	18 June 1905	Liberal Party	I. Tisza I SZP	13 (1901)
14		Endre György (1848–1927)	18 June 1905	18 October 1905	Liberal Party	Fejérváry; SZP	14 (1905)
15		Artúr Feilitzsch (1859–1925)	18 October 1905	8 April 1906	Liberal Party	Fejérváry; SZP	14 (1905)
(12)		Ignác Darányi (1849–1927); 2nd term	8 April 1906	17 January 1910	National Constitution Party	Wekerle II; F48P–OAP–KNP–PDP	15 (1906)
16		Béla Serényi (1866–1919); 1st term	17 January 1910	22 April 1912	National Party of Work	Khuen-Héderváry II; NMP	15 (1906)
16		Béla Serényi (1866–1919); 1st term	17 January 1910	22 April 1912	National Party of Work	Khuen-Héderváry II; NMP	16 (1910)
16		Béla Serényi (1866–1919); 1st term	22 April 1912	10 June 1913	National Party of Work	Lukács; NMP	16 (1910)
17		Imre Ghillány (1860–1922)	10 June 1913	15 June 1917	National Party of Work	I. Tisza II; NMP	16 (1910)
18		Béla Mezőssy (1870–1939)	15 June 1917	23 August 1917	F48P	Esterházy; NMP–F48P–OAP–PDP–KNP	16 (1910)
18		Béla Mezőssy (1870–1939)	23 August 1917	25 January 1918	F48P	Wekerle III; NMP–F48P–OAP–PDP–KNP	16 (1910)
—		Sándor Wekerle (1848–1921) acting	25 January 1918	11 February 1918	Constitution Party of '48	Wekerle III; NMP–F48P–OAP–PDP–KNP	16 (1910)
(16)		Béla Serényi (1866–1919); 2nd term	11 February 1918	31 October 1918	National Party of Work	Wekerle III; NMP–F48P–OAP–PDP–KNP	16 (1910)
—		István Szabó de Nagyatád (1863–1924)	30 October 1918	31 October 1918	O48FGP	Hadik not formed	16 (1910)
19		Barna Buza (1873–1944)	31 October 1918	16 November 1918	F48P–Károlyi	M. Károlyi; F48P–Károlyi–PRP–MSZDP	MNT (—)

=== Hungarian People's Republic (1918–1919) ===
Parties F48P–Károlyi

No.	Portrait	Name (Birth–Death)	Term of office		Political party	Cabinet	Assembly (Election)
1		Barna Buza (1873–1944)	16 November 1918	19 January 1919	F48P–Károlyi	M. Károlyi; F48P–Károlyi–PRP–MSZDP	MNT (—)
1		Barna Buza (1873–1944)	19 January 1919	21 March 1919	F48P–Károlyi	Berinkey; F48P–Károlyi–PRP–MSZDP–OKGFP	MNT (—)

== People's Commissars of Agriculture (1919) ==
=== Hungarian Soviet Republic (1919) ===
Parties MSZP/SZKMMP

No.	Portrait	Name (Birth–Death)	Term of office		Political party	Cabinet	Assembly (Election)
1		Sándor Csizmadia (1871–1929) serving with György Nyisztor, Jenő Hamburger and Károly Vántus	21 March 1919	3 April 1919	MSZP	Central Executive Council; MSZP/SZKMMP	TOGY (—)
1		György Nyisztor (1869–1956) serving with Sándor Csizmadia, Jenő Hamburger and Károly Vántus	21 March 1919	24 June 1919	MSZP/SZKMMP	Central Executive Council; MSZP/SZKMMP	TOGY (—)
1		Jenő Hamburger (1883–1936) serving with Sándor Csizmadia, György Nyisztor and Károly Vántus	21 March 1919	1 August 1919	MSZP/SZKMMP	Central Executive Council; MSZP/SZKMMP	TOGY (—)
1		Károly Vántus (1879–1927) serving with Sándor Csizmadia, György Nyisztor and Jenő Hamburger	21 March 1919	1 August 1919	MSZP/SZKMMP	Central Executive Council; MSZP/SZKMMP	TOGY (—)

==== Counter-revolutionary governments (1919) ====
Parties Independent

No.	Portrait	Name (Birth–Death)	Term of office		Political party	Cabinet	Assembly (Election)
—		János Kintzig (1870–1939)	5 May 1919	31 May 1919	Independent	Arad	—
—		János Kintzig (1870–1939)	31 May 1919	6 June 1919	Independent	Szeged I	—
—		János Kintzig (1870–1939)	6 June 1919	12 July 1919	Independent	Szeged II	—

== Ministers of Agriculture (1919–1967) ==
=== Hungarian People's Republic (1919) ===
Parties MSZDP

No.	Portrait	Name (Birth–Death)	Term of office		Political party	Cabinet	Assembly (Election)
1		József Takács (1884–1961)	1 August 1919	6 August 1919 (deposed)	MSZDP	Peidl; MSZDP	—

=== Hungarian Republic (1919–1920) ===
Parties National Smallholders and Agricultural Labourers Party (OKGFP) Independent

No.	Portrait	Name (Birth–Death)	Term of office		Political party	Cabinet	Assembly (Election)
—		Loránd Győry (1871–1926) acting	7 August 1919	15 August 1919	Independent	Friedrich; KNP/KNEP–OKGFP	—
1		István Szabó de Nagyatád (1863–1924); 1st term	15 August 1919	27 August 1919	OKGFP	Friedrich; KNP/KNEP–OKGFP	—
2		Gyula Rubinek (1865–1922)	27 August 1919	24 November 1919	OKGFP	Friedrich; KNP/KNEP–OKGFP	—
2		Gyula Rubinek (1865–1922)	24 November 1919	29 February 1920	OKGFP	Huszár; KNEP–OKGFP–MSZDP–NDPP	—

=== Hungarian Kingdom (1920–1946) ===
Parties National Smallholders and Agricultural Labourers Party (OKGFP) EP–NEP–MÉP Transylvanian Party Independent

No.	Portrait	Name (Birth–Death)	Term of office		Political party	Cabinet	Assembly (Election)
1		Gyula Rubinek (1865–1922)	29 February 1920	15 March 1920	OKGFP	Huszár; KNEP–OKGFP–MSZDP–NDPP	—
1		Gyula Rubinek (1865–1922)	15 March 1920	19 July 1920	OKGFP	Simonyi-Semadam; KNEP–OKGFP	17 (1920)
1		Gyula Rubinek (1865–1922)	19 July 1920	15 August 1920	OKGFP	Teleki I KNEP–OKGFP	17 (1920)
2		István Szabó de Nagyatád (1863–1924); 2nd term	15 August 1920	14 April 1921	OKGFP	Teleki I KNEP–OKGFP	17 (1920)
2		István Szabó de Nagyatád (1863–1924); 2nd term	14 April 1921	3 December 1921	OKGFP	Bethlen (KNEP–OKGFP)→EP	17 (1920)
3		János Mayer (1871–1955); 1st term	3 December 1921	2 February 1922	OKGFP	Bethlen (KNEP–OKGFP)→EP	17 (1920)
(3)		János Mayer (1871–1955); 1st term	2 February 1922	16 June 1922	EP	Bethlen (KNEP–OKGFP)→EP	17 (1920)
(2)		István Szabó de Nagyatád (1863–1924); 3rd term	16 June 1922	14 October 1924	EP	Bethlen (KNEP–OKGFP)→EP	18 (1922)
—		István Bethlen (1874–1946) acting	14 October 1924	15 November 1924	EP	Bethlen (KNEP–OKGFP)→EP	18 (1922)
(3)		János Mayer (1871–1955); 2nd term	15 November 1924	24 August 1931	EP	Bethlen (KNEP–OKGFP)→EP	18 (1922)
(3)		János Mayer (1871–1955); 2nd term	15 November 1924	24 August 1931	EP	Bethlen (KNEP–OKGFP)→EP	19 (1926)
(3)		János Mayer (1871–1955); 2nd term	15 November 1924	24 August 1931	EP	Bethlen (KNEP–OKGFP)→EP	20 (1931)
4		Béla Ivády (1873–1962)	24 August 1931	4 February 1932	EP	G. Károlyi; EP–KGSZP	20 (1931)
5		Emil Purgly (1880–1964)	4 February 1932	1 October 1932	EP	G. Károlyi; EP–KGSZP	20 (1931)
6		Miklós Kállay (1887–1967)	1 October 1932	9 January 1935	NEP	Gömbös; NEP	20 (1931)
7		Kálmán Darányi (1886–1939)	9 January 1935	12 October 1936	NEP	Gömbös; NEP	20 (1931)
7		Kálmán Darányi (1886–1939)	9 January 1935	12 October 1936	NEP	Gömbös; NEP	21 (1935)
7		Kálmán Darányi (1886–1939)	12 October 1936	9 March 1938	NEP	Darányi; NEP	21 (1935)
8		Ferenc Marschall (1887–1970)	9 March 1938	14 May 1938	NEP	Darányi; NEP	21 (1935)
9		Sándor Sztranyavszky (1882–1942)	14 May 1938	15 November 1938	NEP	Imrédy; NEP	21 (1935)
10		Mihály Teleki (1896–1991)	15 November 1938	16 February 1939	NEP	Imrédy; NEP	21 (1935)
10		Mihály Teleki (1896–1991)	16 February 1939	30 December 1940	MÉP	Teleki II; MÉP	21 (1935)
10		Mihály Teleki (1896–1991)	16 February 1939	30 December 1940	MÉP	Teleki II; MÉP	22 (1939)
11		Dániel Bánffy (1893–1955)	30 December 1940	3 April 1941	Transylvanian Party	Teleki II; MÉP	22 (1939)
11		Dániel Bánffy (1893–1955)	3 April 1941	9 March 1942	Transylvanian Party	Bárdossy; MÉP	22 (1939)
11		Dániel Bánffy (1893–1955)	9 March 1942	22 March 1944 (deposed)	Transylvanian Party	Kállay; MÉP	22 (1939)
12		Béla Jurcsek (1893–1945)	22 March 1944	29 August 1944	MÉP	Sztójay; MÉP–MMP	22 (1939)
12		Béla Jurcsek (1893–1945)	29 August 1944	16 October 1944 (deposed)	MÉP	Lakatos; MÉP	22 (1939)

==== Government of National Unity (1944–1945) ====
Parties Arrow Cross Party

No.	Portrait	Name (Birth–Death)	Term of office		Political party	Cabinet	Assembly (Election)
1		Fidél Pálffy (1895–1946)	16 October 1944	28 March 1945	NYKP	Szálasi; NYKP–MMP	—

==== Soviet-backed provisional governments (1944–1946) ====
Parties MKP FKGP

No.	Portrait	Name (Birth–Death)	Term of office		Political party	Cabinet	Assembly (Election)
1		Imre Nagy (1896–1958)	22 December 1944	15 November 1945	MKP	Provisional National Government; FKGP–MKP–MSZDP–NPP–PDP	INGY (1944)
2		Béla Kovács (1885–1950)	15 November 1945	1 February 1946	FKGP	Tildy; FKGP–MKP–MSZDP–NPP	INGY (1944)
2		Béla Kovács (1885–1950)	15 November 1945	1 February 1946	FKGP	Tildy; FKGP–MKP–MSZDP–NPP	23 (1945)

=== Hungarian Republic (1946–1949) ===
Parties FKGP NPP

No.	Portrait	Name (Birth–Death)	Term of office		Political party	Cabinet	Assembly (Election)
1		Béla Kovács (1885–1950)	1 February 1946	23 February 1946	FKGP	F. Nagy; FKGP–MKP–MSZDP–NPP	23 (1945)
2		István Dobi (1898–1968); 1st term	23 February 1946	20 November 1946	FKGP	F. Nagy; FKGP–MKP–MSZDP–NPP	23 (1945)
3		Károly Bárányos (1892–1956)	20 November 1946	31 May 1947	FKGP	F. Nagy; FKGP–MKP–MSZDP–NPP	23 (1945)
3		Károly Bárányos (1892–1956)	31 May 1947	24 September 1947	FKGP	Dinnyés; MKP–FKGP–MSZDP–NPP	23 (1945)
3		Károly Bárányos (1892–1956)	31 May 1947	24 September 1947	FKGP	Dinnyés; MKP–FKGP–MSZDP–NPP	24 (1947)
4		Árpád Szabó (1878–1948)	24 September 1947	16 April 1948	FKGP	Dinnyés; MKP–FKGP–MSZDP–NPP	24 (1947)
(2)		István Dobi (1898–1968); 2nd term	16 April 1948	9 December 1948	FKGP	Dinnyés; MKP–FKGP–MSZDP–NPP	24 (1947)
—		István Dobi (1898–1968) acting	9 December 1948	10 December 1948	FKGP	Dinnyés; MKP–FKGP–MSZDP–NPP	24 (1947)
5		István Csala (1899–1987)	10 December 1948	11 June 1949	FKGP	Dobi; MDP–FKGP–NPP	24 (1947)
6		Ferenc Erdei (1910–1971)	11 June 1949	20 August 1949	NPP	Dobi; MDP–FKGP–NPP	25 (1949)

=== Hungarian People's Republic (1949–1967) ===
Parties MDP-MSZMP FKGP MSZP Independent

No.	Portrait	Name (Birth–Death)	Term of office		Political party	Cabinet	Assembly (Election)
1		Ferenc Erdei (1910–1971); 1st term	20 August 1949	14 August 1952	Independent	Dobi; MDP	25 (1949)
1		Ferenc Erdei (1910–1971); 1st term	14 August 1952	4 July 1953	Independent	Rákosi; MDP	25 (1949)
2		András Hegedüs (1922–1977)	4 July 1953	30 October 1954	MDP	I. Nagy I MDP	26 (1953)
(1)		Ferenc Erdei (1910–1971); 2nd term	30 October 1954	18 April 1955	Independent	I. Nagy I MDP	26 (1953)
(1)		Ferenc Erdei (1910–1971); 2nd term	18 April 1955	15 November 1955	Independent	Hegedüs; MDP	26 (1953)
3		János Matolcsi (1923–1983)	15 November 1955	24 October 1956	MDP	Hegedüs; MDP	26 (1953)
4		Béla Kovács (1885–1950)	24 October 1956	3 November 1956	FKGP	I. Nagy II; MDP/MSZMP–FKGP	26 (1953)
5		Imre Dögei (1912–1964)	4 November 1956	28 January 1958	MSZMP	Kádár I MSZMP	26 (1953)
5		Imre Dögei (1912–1964)	28 January 1958	15 January 1960	MSZMP	Münnich; MSZMP	26 (1953)
5		Imre Dögei (1912–1964)	28 January 1958	15 January 1960	MSZMP	Münnich; MSZMP	27 (1958)
6		Pál Losonczi (1919–2005)	15 January 1960	13 September 1961	MSZMP	Münnich; MSZMP	27 (1958)
6		Pál Losonczi (1919–2005)	13 September 1961	30 June 1965	MSZMP	Kádár II; MSZMP	27 (1958)
6		Pál Losonczi (1919–2005)	13 September 1961	30 June 1965	MSZMP	Kádár II; MSZMP	28 (1963)
6		Pál Losonczi (1919–2005)	30 June 1965	14 April 1967	MSZMP	Kállai; MSZMP	28 (1963)

== Ministers of Agriculture and Food (1967–1990) ==
=== Hungarian People's Republic (1967–1989) ===
Parties MSZMP Independent

No.	Portrait	Name (Birth–Death)	Term of office		Political party	Cabinet	Assembly (Election)
1		Imre Dimény (1922–2017)	14 April 1967	15 May 1975	MSZMP	Fock; MSZMP	29 (1967)
1		Imre Dimény (1922–2017)	14 April 1967	15 May 1975	MSZMP	Fock; MSZMP	30 (1971)
1		Imre Dimény (1922–2017)	15 May 1975	4 July 1975	MSZMP	Lázár; MSZMP	30 (1971)
2		Pál Romány (1929–2019)	4 July 1975	27 June 1980	MSZMP	Lázár; MSZMP	31 (1975)
3		Jenő Váncsa (1928–2016)	27 June 1980	25 June 1987	MSZMP	Lázár; MSZMP	32 (1980)
3		Jenő Váncsa (1928–2016)	27 June 1980	25 June 1987	MSZMP	Lázár; MSZMP	33 (1985)
3		Jenő Váncsa (1928–2016)	25 June 1987	24 November 1988	MSZMP	Grósz; MSZMP	33 (1985)
3		Jenő Váncsa (1928–2016)	24 November 1988	10 May 1989	MSZMP	Németh (MSZMP)→MSZP	33 (1985)
4		Csaba Hütter (1943–)	10 May 1989	7 October 1989	MSZMP	Németh (MSZMP)→MSZP	33 (1985)
(4)		Csaba Hütter (1943–)	7 October 1989	23 October 1989	Independent	Németh (MSZMP)→MSZP	33 (1985)

=== Hungarian Republic (1989–1990) ===
Parties Independent

No.	Portrait	Name (Birth–Death)	Term of office		Political party	Cabinet	Assembly (Election)
—		Csaba Hütter (1943–) provisional	23 October 1989	23 May 1990	Independent	Németh; MSZP	—

== Ministers of Agriculture (1990–1998) ==
=== Hungarian Republic (1990–2006) ===
Parties FKGP EKGP MSZP

No.	Portrait	Name (Birth–Death)	Term of office		Political party	Cabinet	Assembly (Election)
1		Ferenc József Nagy (1923–2019)	23 May 1990	16 January 1991	FKGP	Antall; MDF–FKGP–KDNP	34 (1990)
2		Elemér Gergátz (1942–2019)	16 January 1991	24 February 1992	FKGP	Antall; MDF–FKGP–KDNP	34 (1990)
(2)		Elemér Gergátz (1942–2019)	24 February 1992	22 February 1993	EKGP	Antall; MDF–FKGP–KDNP	34 (1990)
3		János Szabó (1937–2021)	22 February 1993	21 December 1993	EKGP	Antall; MDF–FKGP–KDNP	34 (1990)
3		János Szabó (1937–2021)	21 December 1993	15 July 1994	EKGP	Boross; MDF–EKGP–KDNP	34 (1990)
4		László Lakos (1945–)	15 July 1994	15 December 1996	MSZP	Horn; MSZP–SZDSZ	35 (1994)
5		Frigyes Nagy (1939–)	15 December 1996	8 July 1998	MSZP	Horn; MSZP–SZDSZ	35 (1994)

== Ministers of Agriculture and Rural Development (1998–2010) ==
=== Hungarian Republic (1998–2010) ===
Parties FKGP MSZP

No.	Portrait	Name (Birth–Death)	Term of office		Political party	Cabinet	Assembly (Election)
1		József Torgyán (1932–2017)	8 July 1998	15 February 2001	FKGP	Orbán I Fidesz–FKGP–MDF	36 (1998)
—		Imre Boros (1947–) acting	15 February 2001	25 March 2001	FKGP	Orbán I Fidesz–FKGP–MDF	36 (1998)
2		András Vonza (1955–)	25 March 2001	27 May 2002	FKGP	Orbán I Fidesz–FKGP–MDF	36 (1998)
3		Imre Németh (1955–)	27 May 2002	4 October 2004	MSZP	Medgyessy; MSZP–SZDSZ	37 (2002)
3		Imre Németh (1955–)	4 October 2004	1 May 2005	MSZP	Gyurcsány I MSZP–SZDSZ	37 (2002)
4		József Gráf (1946–)	1 May 2005	9 June 2006	MSZP	Gyurcsány I MSZP–SZDSZ	37 (2002)
4		József Gráf (1946–)	9 June 2006	14 April 2009	MSZP	Gyurcsány II; MSZP–SZDSZ	38 (2006)
4		József Gráf (1946–)	14 April 2009	29 May 2010	MSZP	Bajnai; MSZP	38 (2006)

== Ministers of Rural Development (2010–2014) ==
=== Hungarian Republic / Hungary (2010–2014) ===
Parties Fidesz

No.	Portrait	Name (Birth–Death)	Term of office		Political party	Cabinet	Assembly (Election)
1		Sándor Fazekas (1963–)	29 May 2010	6 June 2014	Fidesz	Orbán II; Fidesz–KDNP	39 (2010)

== Ministers of Agriculture (2014–2026) ==
=== Hungary (2014–present) ===
Parties Fidesz

No.	Portrait	Name (Birth–Death)	Term of office		Political party	Cabinet	Assembly (Election)
1		Sándor Fazekas (1963–)	6 June 2014	18 May 2018	Fidesz	Orbán III; Fidesz–KDNP	40 (2014)
2		István Nagy (1967–)	18 May 2018	9 May 2026	Fidesz	Orbán IV; Fidesz–KDNP	41 (2018)

== Ministers of Agriculture and Food Industry (2026–present) ==
=== Hungary (2014–present) ===
Parties TISZA

No.	Portrait	Name (Birth–Death)	Term of office		Political party	Cabinet	Assembly (Election)
1		Szabolcs Bóna (1975–)	9 May 2026	Incumbent	TISZA	Magyar; Tisza	43 (2026)

== See also ==
- List of heads of state of Hungary
- List of prime ministers of Hungary
- Politics of Hungary

Cabinet ministers

- Minister of Civilian Intelligence Services (Hungary)
- Minister of Croatian Affairs of Hungary
- Minister of Defence (Hungary)
- Minister of Education (Hungary)
- Minister of Finance (Hungary)
- Minister of Foreign Affairs (Hungary)
- Minister of the Interior (Hungary)
- Minister of Justice (Hungary)
- Minister of Public Works and Transport (Hungary)
