= Frigyes Nagy =

Minister of Agriculture of Hungary (born 1939)

Minister of Agriculture of Hungary
- In office 16 December 1996 – 8 July 1998
- Prime Minister: Gyula Horn
- Preceded by: László Lakos
- Succeeded by: József Torgyán (Minister of Agriculture and Rural Development)

Personal details
- Born: 6 June 1939 (age 87) Magyaróvár, Kingdom of Hungary
- Party: MSZP
- Profession: politician

Frigyes Nagy (born 6 June 1939) is a Hungarian agrarian engineer and former politician, who served as Minister of Agriculture between 1996 and 1998.

Political offices
Preceded by László Lakos	Minister of Agriculture; 1996–1998	Succeeded by József Torgyán
