= Imre Boros =

Hungarian economist and politician

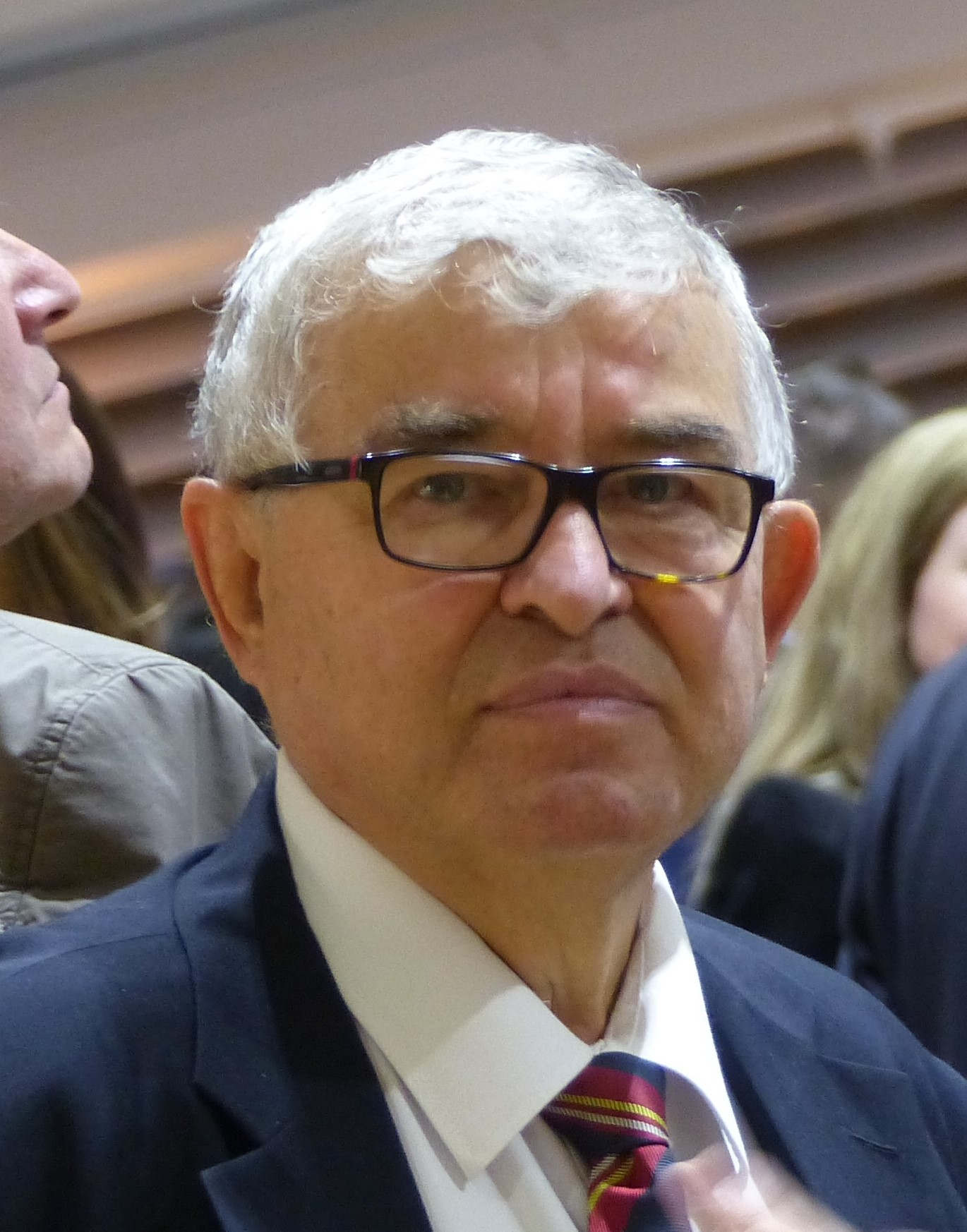

Minister of Agriculture and Rural Development Acting
- In office 16 February 2001 – 26 March 2001
- Preceded by: József Torgyán
- Succeeded by: András Vonza

Personal details
- Born: 18 July 1947 (age 78) Csöde, Second Hungarian Republic
- Party: FKGP, MDF
- Profession: economist, politician

Imre Boros (born 18 July 1947) is a Hungarian economist and politician, who served as minister without portfolio and acting Minister of Agriculture in 2001 for a month.

Political offices
Preceded by József Torgyán	Minister of Agriculture and Rural Development; Acting; 2001	Succeeded by András Vonza
