= József Zichy =

Hungarian politician (1841–1924)

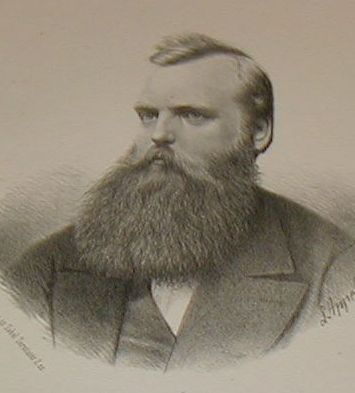

Minister of Agriculture, Industry and Trade of Hungary
- In office 5 December 1872 – 21 March 1874
- Preceded by: József Szlávy
- Succeeded by: György Bartal

Personal details
- Born: 13 November 1841; Pozsony, Kingdom of Hungary
- Died: 11 November 1924 (aged 82); Vedrőd, Kingdom of Hungary
- Political party: Deák Party
- Profession: politician

Count József Zichy de Zich et Vásonkeő (13 November 1841 – 11 November 1924) was a Hungarian politician, who served as Minister of Agriculture, Industry and Trade between 1872 and 1874 and as Minister of Public Works and Transport from 1873 to 1875. He was the first governor of Fiume since 1870.

Political offices
Preceded by József Szlávy	Minister of Agriculture, Industry and Trade; 1872–1874	Succeeded by György Bartal
Preceded by Lajos Tisza	Minister of Public Works and Transport; 1873–1875	Succeeded by Tamás Péchy
