= Andor Festetics =

Hungarian politician (1843–1930)

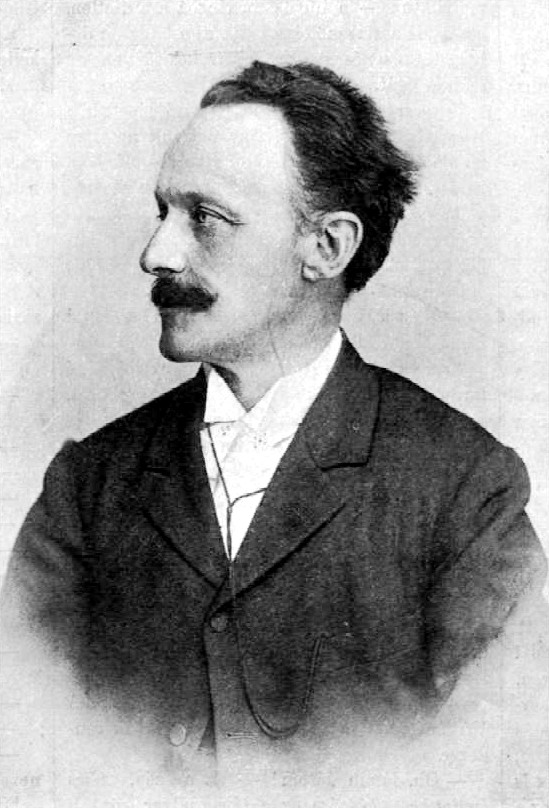
- Festetics in 1894

Minister of Agriculture of Hungary
- In office 16 July 1894 – 2 November 1895
- Prime Minister: Sándor Wekerle
- Preceded by: Géza Fejérváry
- Succeeded by: Ignác Darányi

Personal details
- Born: 17 January 1843 Pest, Kingdom of Hungary
- Died: 16 August 1930 (aged 87) Böhönye, Kingdom of Hungary
- Party: Liberal Party
- Profession: politician

Count Andor Festetics de Tolna (17 January 1843 – 16 August 1930) was a Hungarian politician, who served as Minister of Agriculture between 1894 and 1895. He was married to Lenke Pejacsevich de Verőcze. One of his three sons was Sándor Festetics, Minister of War who later became an advocate of Nazism in Hungary.

His first son was Gustavus Alexander Festetics de Tolna (11 March 1873 – 8 August 1905), who married Elsa Goldfinger.

Political offices
Preceded by Géza Fejérváry	Minister of Agriculture; 1894–1895	Succeeded by Ignác Darányi
