= István Nagy (politician, born 1967) =

Hungarian agricultural engineer and politician

István Nagy MP
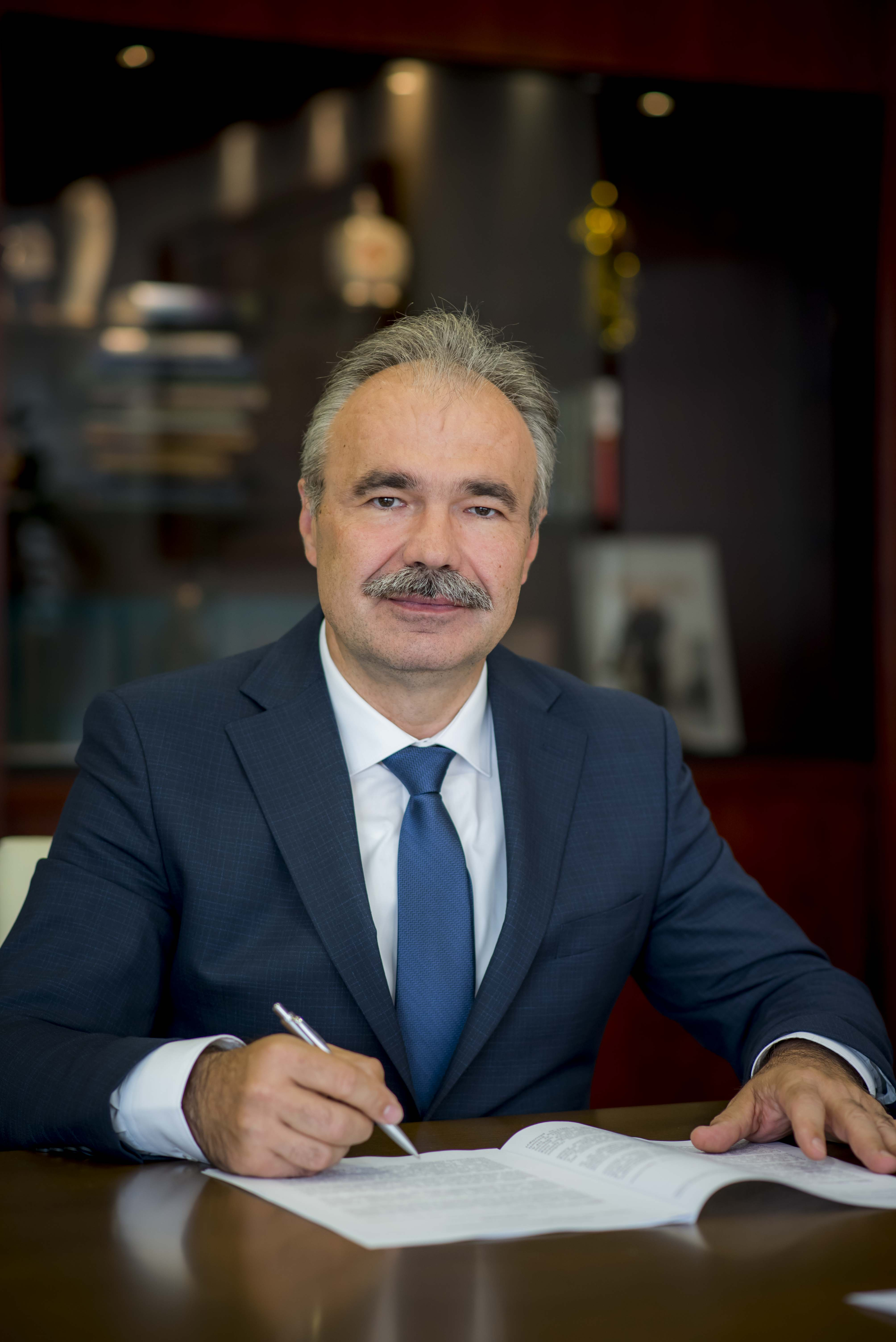
- Nagy in 2019

Minister of Agriculture
- In office 18 May 2018 – 9 May 2026
- Prime Minister: Viktor Orbán
- Preceded by: Sándor Fazekas
- Succeeded by: Szabolcs Bóna (as Minister of Agriculture and Food); László Gajdos (as Minister of the Living Environment)

Member of the National Assembly
- Incumbent
- Assumed office 14 May 2010

Personal details
- Born: 6 October 1967 (age 58) Újfehértó, Hungary
- Party: Fidesz
- Spouse: Ágnes Szabó
- Children: 2
- Parents: István Nagy; Irma Fodor
- Education: University of Pannonia; Budapest University of Technology and Economics; University of Sopron (PhD)
- Profession: Agricultural engineer; politician
- Website: István Nagy website

István Nagy (born 6 October 1967) is a Hungarian agricultural engineer and politician who has served as the Minister of Agriculture in Hungary between 2018 and 2026.

== Profession ==
Nagy was born in Újfehértó, where he spent his childhood and attended elementary school. He finished his secondary studies at the János Balásházy Agricultural Secondary School in Debrecen in 1986. He attended the Pannon University of Agricultural Sciences, Faculty of Agricultural Sciences in Mosonmagyaróvár, where earned a degree of agrarian engineer in 1992. He graduated from the Faculty of Natural and Social Sciences of the Budapest University of Technology and Economics (BME) as an engineering teacher in 1996. He received a PhD degree at the Imre Ujhelyi Doctoral School of Zoology at the University of West Hungary (NYME) in 2007.

Between 1 January 1993, and 15 August 1994, he taught animal husbandry and feeding at the Péter Veres agricultural vocational high school. Then he joined the academic staff of the Faculty of Agricultural Sciences of the Pannon University of Agricultural Sciences, then after the 2000s’ restructurings, the University of West Hungary in Mosonmagyaróvár. He taught beekeeping, rabbit and fur animal husbandry among other professional methodologies.

== Political career ==
Nagy served as deputy mayor of Mosonmagyaróvár from 2006 to 2010. He is a member of the National Assembly (MP) for Mosonmagyaróvár (Győr-Moson-Sopron County Constituency IV then V) since 2010. He was elected mayor of Mosonmagyaróvár as the candidate of the Fidesz in the 2010 local elections. He held that position until June 2014, when he was appointed Parliamentary Secretary of State for Agriculture on 15 June 2014.

Nagy was a member of the Committee on Audit Office and Budget from 14 May 2010, to 5 May 2014, and of the Committee on Agriculture from 23 September 2013, to 18 June 2014. He was also a vice-chairman of the latter committee for a short time between May and June 2014.

Following the 2018 parliamentary election, Nagy was appointed Minister of Agriculture in the Fourth Orbán Government, replacing Sándor Fazekas. He retained his position in the Fifth Orbán Government.

== Personal life ==
He is married to Dr. Istvánné Nagy. They have together two children — a daughter, Veronika, and a son, István.

Political offices
| Preceded by Sándor Fazekas | Minister of Agriculture; 2018– | Succeeded by Incumbent |
