= Jenő Hamburger =

Hungarian politician (1883–1936)

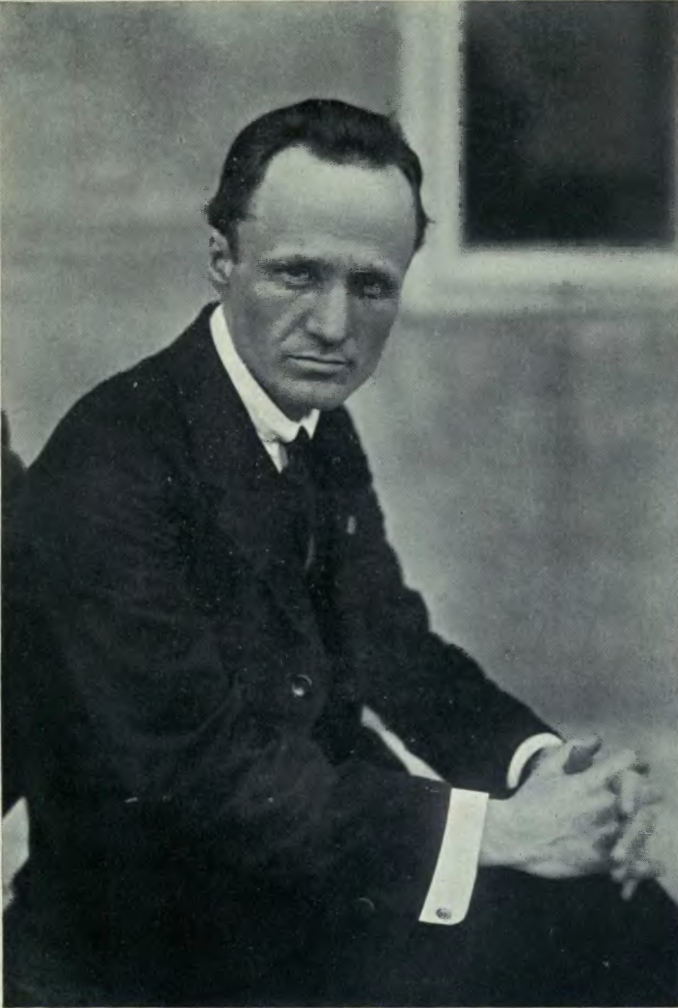

People's Commissar of Agriculture of Hungary
- In office 21 March 1919 – 1 August 1919 Serving with Sándor Csizmadia (until 3 April 1919), György Nyisztor (until 24 July 1919) and Károly Vántus
- Preceded by: Barna Buza
- Succeeded by: József Takács

Personal details
- Born: 31 May 1883 Zalaudvarnok, Kingdom of Hungary, Austria-Hungary
- Died: 14 December 1936 (aged 53) Moscow, Soviet Union
- Party: MSZDP
- Profession: politician

Jenő Hamburger (31 May 1883 – 14 December 1936) was a Hungarian politician of Jewish descent, who served as People's Commissar of Agriculture during the Hungarian Soviet Republic. He died in the Soviet Union where he worked as a radiologist.

Political offices
Preceded by Barna Buza	People's Commissar of Agriculture served alongside Sándor Csizmadia (until 3 April 1919), György Nyisztor (until 24 July 1919) and Károly Vántus; 1919	Succeeded by József Takács
