= Sándor Csizmadia =

Hungarian politician and poet

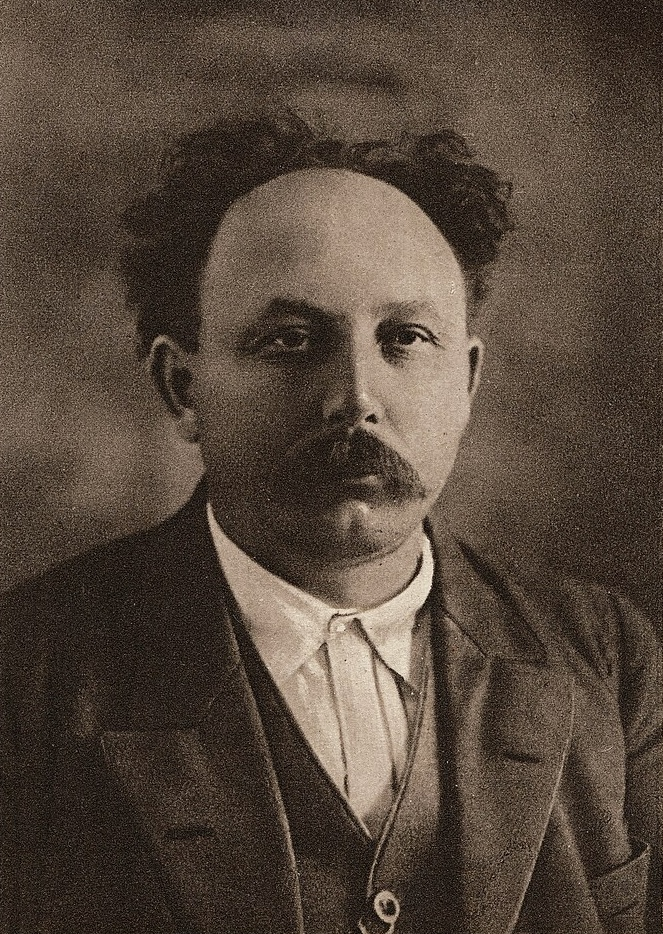
- Portrait of Sándor Csizmadia, 1915

People's Commissar of Agriculture of Hungary served alongside György Nyisztor, Jenő Hamburger and Károly Vántus
- In office 21 March 1919 – 3 April 1919
- Preceded by: Barna Buza
- Succeeded by: György Nyisztor; Jenő Hamburger; Károly Vántus

Personal details
- Born: 10 March 1871 Vásárhelykutas, Kingdom of Hungary, Austria-Hungary
- Died: 3 March 1929 (aged 57) Mátyásföld (now: part of Budapest, Kingdom of Hungary
- Party: MSZDP, National Worker's Party
- Profession: politician, poet, journalist

Sándor Csizmadia (10 March 1871 – 3 March 1929) was a Hungarian politician and poet, who served as People's Commissar of Agriculture during the Hungarian Soviet Republic. However soon his relations decayed with the leaders of the proletarian dictatorship, so he left the Hungarian Central Executive Council. He died by suicide in 1929.

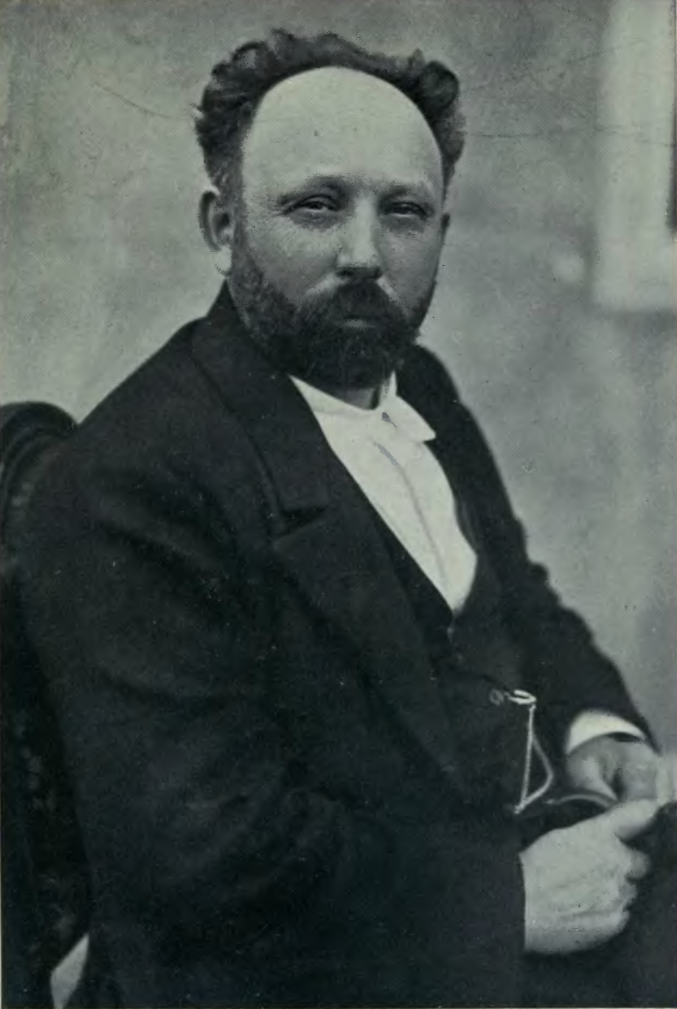
Csizmadia during the Hungarian Soviet Republic in 1919

== Literary works ==
- Magyar Munkásdalok és versek (Orosháza, 1896)
- A földművelő-munkásság helyzete és feladata (Orosháza, 1896)
- Proletár költemények (Budapest, 1897)
- Küzdelem (Újabb versek, Budapest, 1903)
- Mit akarunk? (Budapest, 1903)
- Hajnalban (Budapest, 1905)
- Munkás emberek (short stories, Budapest, 1905)
- Fogházi levelek (Budapest, 1906)
- A feketék (Budapest, 1908)
- A nagy magyar parasztforradalom (Budapest, 1914)
- Válogatott költeményei (Budapest, 1919)

Political offices
Preceded by Barna Buza	People's Commissar of Agriculture served alongside György Nyisztor, Jenő Hamburger and Károly Vántus; 1919	Succeeded by György Nyisztor; Jenő Hamburger; Károly Vántus
