= Endre György =

Hungarian politician (1848–1927)

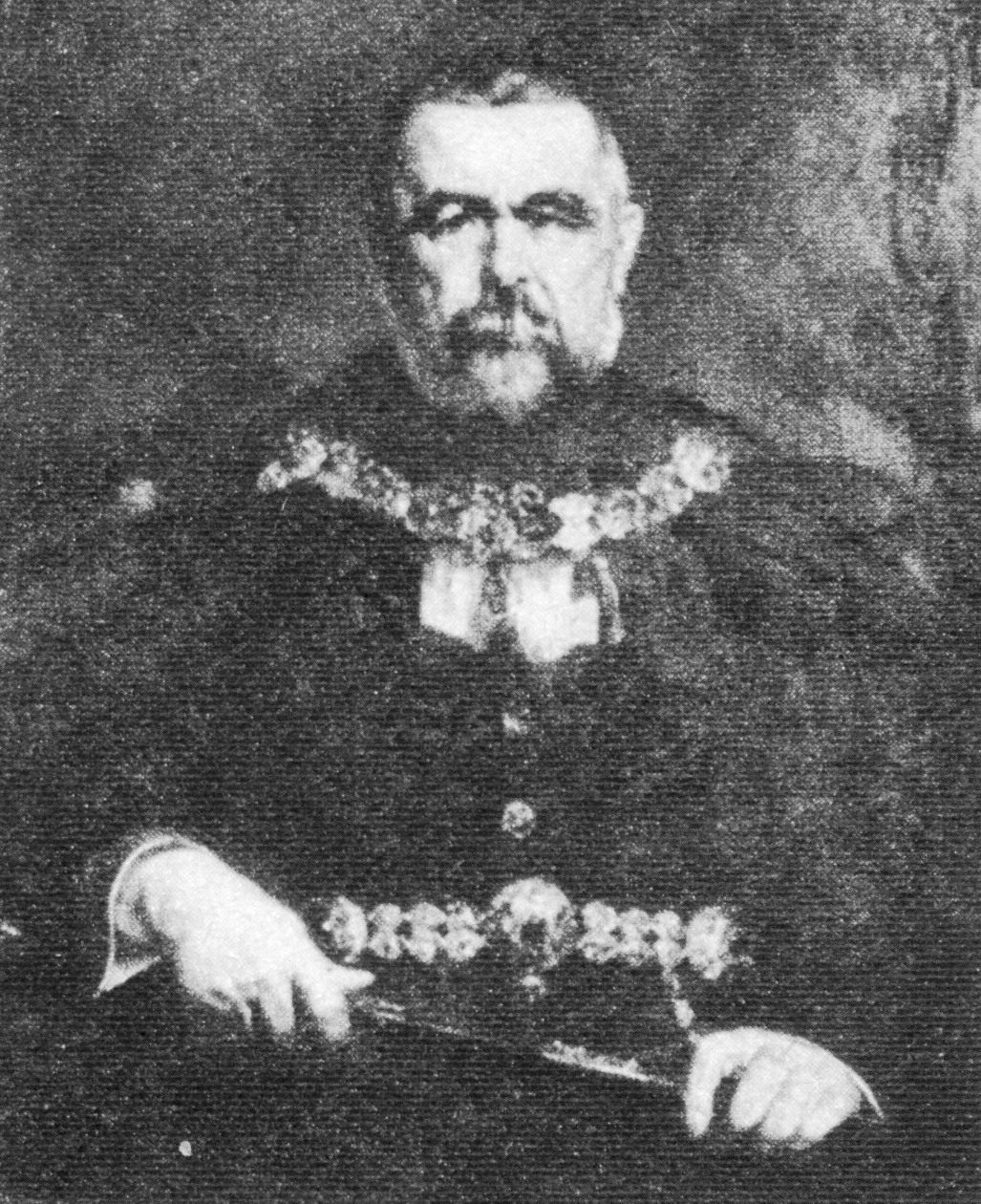

Minister of Agriculture of Hungary
- In office 18 June 1905 – 18 October 1905
- Prime Minister: Géza Fejérváry
- Preceded by: Béla Tallián
- Succeeded by: Artúr Feilitzsch

Personal details
- Born: 18 March 1848 Huszt, Máramaros County, Kingdom of Hungary
- Died: 15 January 1927 (aged 78) Budapest, Kingdom of Hungary
- Party: Liberal Party
- Profession: politician

Endre György (18 March 1848 – 15 January 1927) was a Hungarian politician, who served as Minister of Agriculture in 1905.

Political offices
Preceded by Béla Tallián	Minister of Agriculture; 1905	Succeeded by Artúr Feilitzsch
