= József Gráf =

Hungarian engineer and politician

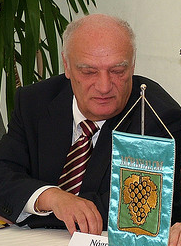

Minister of Agriculture and Rural Development of Hungary
- In office 2 May 2005 – 29 May 2010
- Preceded by: Imre Németh
- Succeeded by: Sándor Fazekas (Rural Development)

Personal details
- Born: 16 October 1946 (age 79) Mecsekszabolcs (today part of Pécs), Second Hungarian Republic
- Party: MSZMP, MSZP
- Children: Csilla; József; Tímea
- Profession: politician

József Gráf (born 16 October 1946) is a Hungarian engineer and politician, who served as Minister of Agriculture and Rural Development between 2005 and 2010.

== Personal life ==
He is married and has three children - two daughters, Csilla and Tímea and a son, József.

Political offices
Preceded by Imre Németh	Minister of Agriculture and Rural Development; 2005–2010	Succeeded by Sándor Fazekas
