= Béla Tallián =

Hungarian politician (1851–1921)

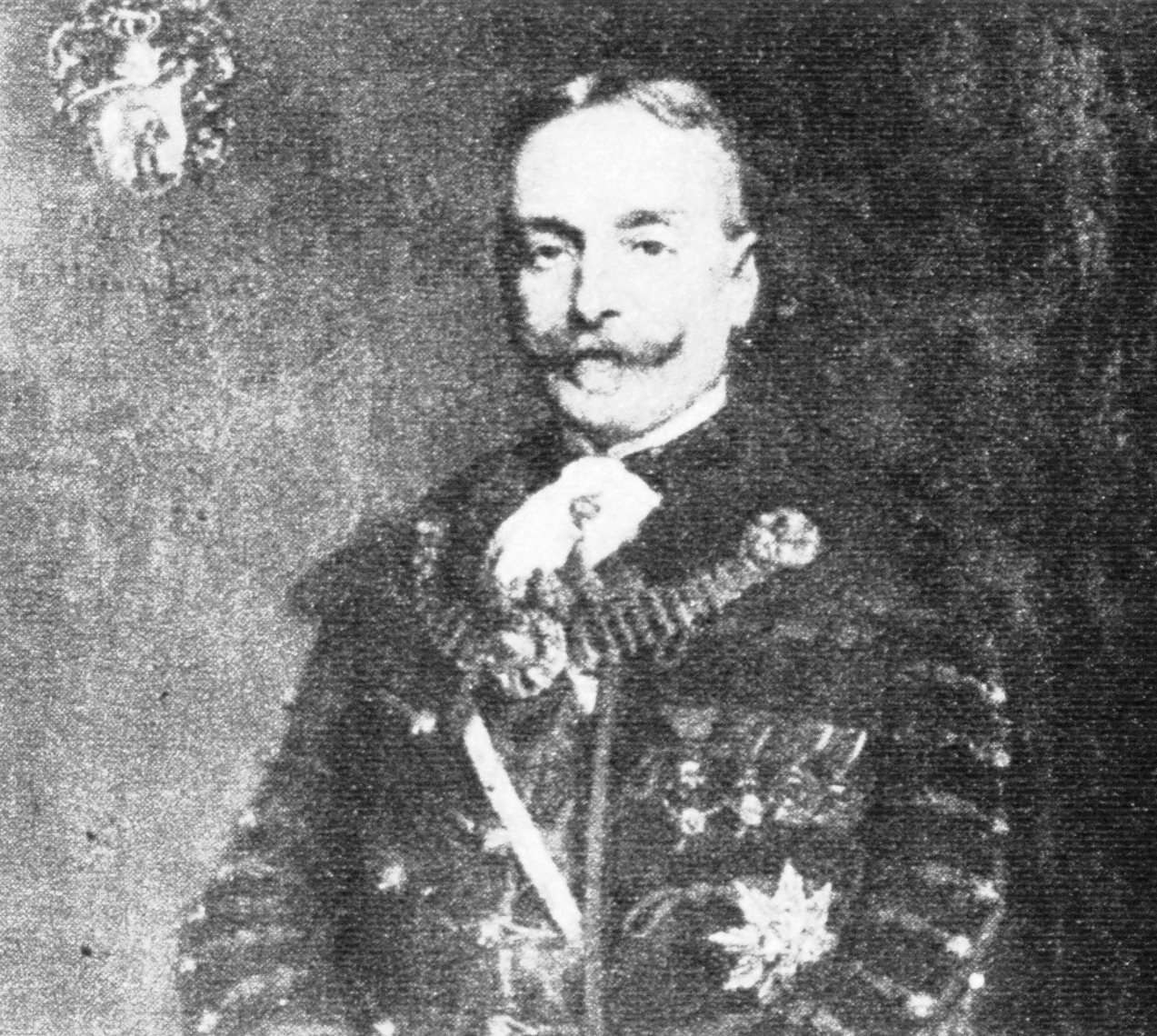

Minister of Agriculture of Hungary
- In office 3 November 1903 – 18 June 1905
- Prime Minister: István Tisza
- Preceded by: Ignác Darányi
- Succeeded by: Endre György

Personal details
- Born: 1851 Szabás, Kingdom of Hungary
- Died: 23 November 1921 (aged 69–70) Kiszombor, Kingdom of Hungary
- Party: Liberal Party
- Profession: politician

Baron Béla Tallián de Vizek (1851 – 23 November 1921) was a Hungarian politician, who served as Minister of Agriculture between 1903 and 1905.

== Biography ==
He was one of the deputy speakers of the House of Representatives from 1899 to 1903. During the First World War he served as civil governor of Belgrade for a short time after the occupation of the Serbian capital city. After the war he escaped to Szeged. He was arrested by the communists during the Hungarian Soviet Republic. After the fall of the communist regime he moved to Szeged.

He was married to Baroness Marija Bajic of Varadia (1864–1932), great-granddaughter of Miloš Obrenović, Prince of Serbia through his eldest daughter Princess Petria Obrenovic (1808–1871). They had three sons and one daughter.

Political offices
Preceded by Ignác Darányi	Minister of Agriculture; 1903–1905	Succeeded by Endre György
