= Loránd Győry =

Hungarian politician (1871–1926)

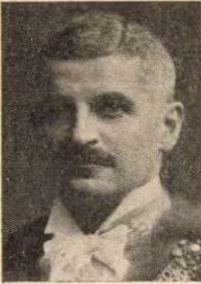

Minister of Agriculture of Hungary
- In office 7 August 1919 – 15 August 1919
- Preceded by: József Takács
- Succeeded by: István Szabó de Nagyatád

Personal details
- Born: 11 April 1871 Orosháza, Kingdom of Hungary, Austria-Hungary
- Died: 30 July 1926 (aged 55) Budapest, Hungary
- Party: Independent
- Profession: politician

Loránd Győry (11 April 1871 – 30 July 1926) was a Hungarian politician, who served as Minister of Agriculture for few days in 1919. He was the son of Vilmos Győry, a Hungarian theologian.

Political offices
Preceded by József Takács	Minister of Agriculture; Acting; 1919	Succeeded by István Szabó de Nagyatád
