= Ferenc Hegedűs (politician) =

Hungarian politician

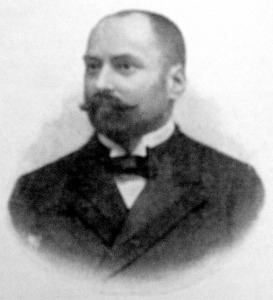

Minister of Finance of Hungary
- In office 6 March 1906 – 8 April 1906
- Preceded by: Géza Fejérváry
- Succeeded by: Sándor Wekerle

Personal details
- Born: 1856
- Died: 15 September 1909; Budapest, Austria-Hungary
- Political party: Independent
- Profession: politician, economist

Ferenc Hegedűs (1856 – 15 September 1909) was a Hungarian politician, who served as Minister of Finance in 1906.

Political offices
Preceded by Géza Fejérváry	Minister of Finance; 1906	Succeeded by Sándor Wekerle
