= György Nyisztor =

Hungarian politician (1869–1956)

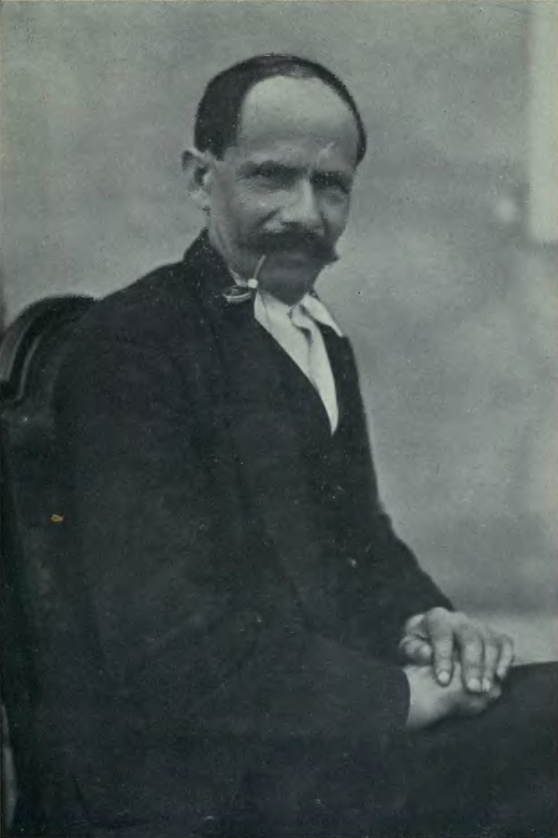

People's Commissar of Agriculture of Hungary served alongside Sándor Csizmadia (until 3 April 1919), Jenő Hamburger and Károly Vántus
- In office 21 March 1919 – 24 July 1919
- Preceded by: Barna Buza
- Succeeded by: Jenő Hamburger; Károly Vántus

Personal details
- Born: 22 December 1869 Szatmárnémeti, Kingdom of Hungary, Austria-Hungary (now Satu Mare, Romania)
- Died: 7 January 1956 (aged 86) Budapest, People's Republic of Hungary
- Political party: SZDP, Communist Party of Hungary
- Spouses: Fehér Julianna; Torzsa Mária 1944-1956
- Parent(s): Görgy Nyisztor; Anna Buga
- Profession: politician

György Nyisztor (22 December 1869 – 7 January 1956) was a Hungarian politician, who served as People's Commissar of Agriculture during the Hungarian Soviet Republic in 1919. After the fall of the communist regime he was sentenced to life imprisonment in 1920. However, in the next year he was taken to the Soviet Union on the occasion of a prisoner exchange. Nyisztor returned to Hungary in 1945.

== Early years ==
His father, György Nyisztor, was a farmer, and his mother, Anna Buga, was a servant. In his childhood, he first worked as a servant, later as a goulash cook, then became a canner, and then a woodcutter. He then worked as a day laborer at the Szatmárném distillery. He joined the labor movement at the beginning of the 1890s, where he encountered socialist ideas, and together with two of his friends, he founded the local organization of the Social Democratic Party of Hungary (Magyarországi Szociáldemokrata Párt or MSZDP) in Szatmárnémeti.

He went to the countryside, where he worked on the organization of harvest strikes and labor unions of Hungarian and Romanian workers and farm workers. On 7 January 1906 the founding meeting of the Hungarian Land Workers' National Association elected him to the central leadership, after which he became the Association's secretary.

He took part in the booming strike movements in various parts of the country as an independent leader, and soon emerged as one of its best-known agitators. He was considered a gifted orator. He took part in the debates organized against Vilmos Mezőfi and his followers. In 1907, he also assisted in the work of the liberal education congress in Pécs. His articles were published by Világszabadság, the land workers' newspaper. He represented the consistent left-wing position in the leadership of the association.

== Revolutionary career, exile and return ==
He was present at the social democratic meetings that prepared the revolutionary movement of October 1918. After the Hungarian Soviet Republic was proclaimed, he belonged to the left within the MSZDP. He became a member of the Party of Communists in Hungary (Hungarian: Kommunisták Magyarországi Pártja or KMP) in March 1919, and worked as a People's Commissar for Agriculture during the Hungarian Council Republic.

After the fall of the Soviet Republic, he set himself the goal of further maintaining the Land Workers' Union, but was arrested on 5 August. In 1920, he was brought to court together with nine of his fellow people's commissars, and in the people's commissar trial he was sentenced to life imprisonment.

In 1921, he was transferred to the Soviet Union as part of the Soviet-Hungarian prisoner exchange, from where he returned home as a pensioner in 1945. He did party work until his death.

Political offices
Preceded by Barna Buza	People's Commissar of Agriculture served alongside Sándor Csizmadia (until 3 April 1919), Jenő Hamburger and Károly Vántus; 1919	Succeeded by Jenő Hamburger; Károly Vántus
