= Gyula Rubinek =

Hungarian politician (1865–1922)

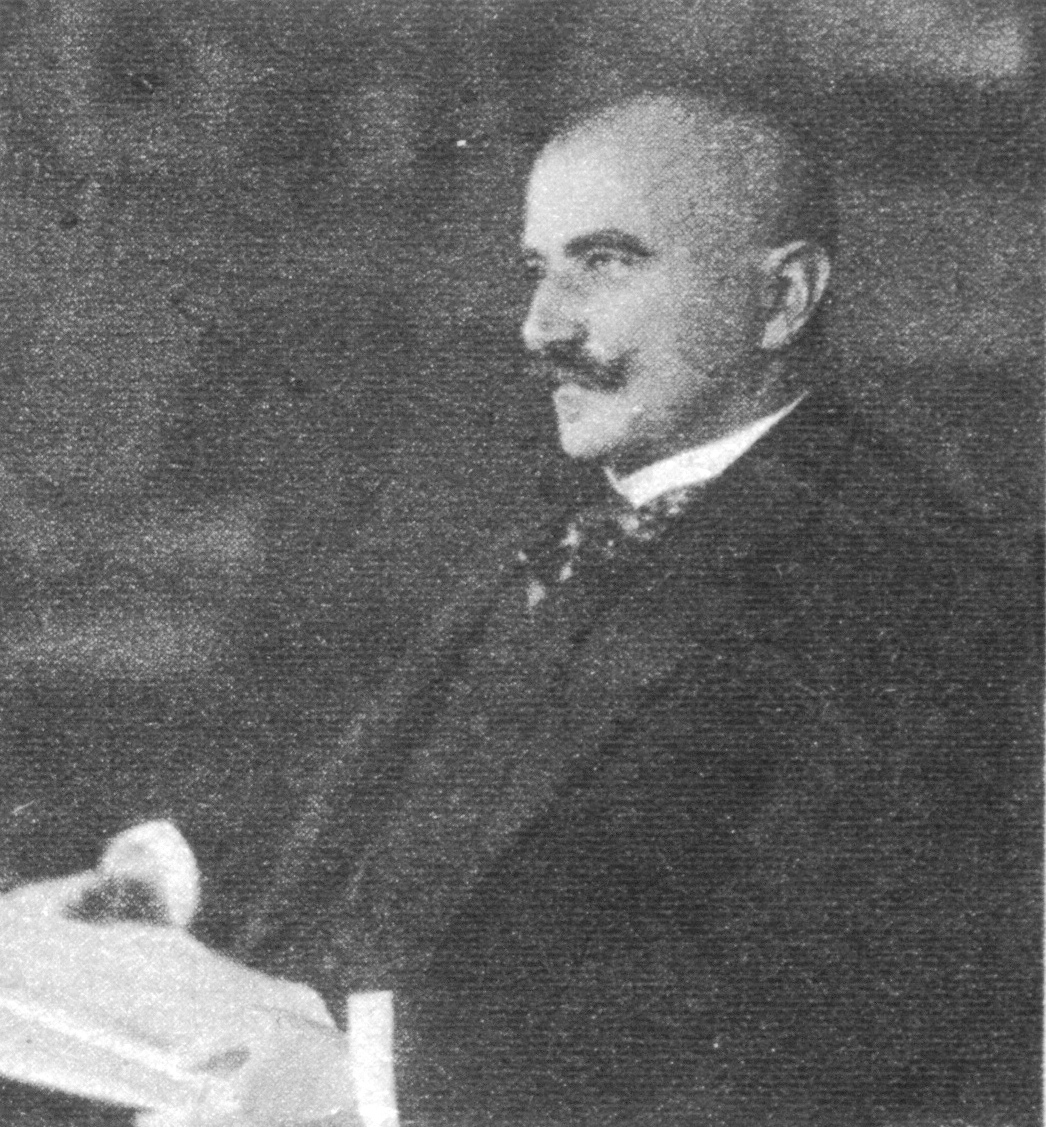

Minister of Agriculture of Hungary
- In office 27 August 1919 – 15 August 1920
- Preceded by: István Szabó de Nagyatád
- Succeeded by: István Szabó de Nagyatád

Personal details
- Born: 10 September 1865 Ohaj, Kingdom of Hungary, Austrian Empire
- Died: 8 January 1922 (aged 56) Budapest, Hungary
- Party: National Smallholders and Agrarian Workers Party (OKGFP)
- Profession: politician

Gyula Rubinek de Zsitvabesenyő (10 September 1865 – 8 January 1922) was a Hungarian politician, who served as Minister of Agriculture between 1919 and 1920. He was also Minister of Trade from 19 July to 16 December 1920. Rubinek was the creator of the land reform which connected to István Szabó de Nagyatád.

Political offices
Preceded by István Szabó de Nagyatád	Minister of Agriculture; 1919–1920	Succeeded by István Szabó de Nagyatád
