= Kráľovičove Kračany =

Kráľovičove Kračany Királyfiakarcsa
- Municipality
- Flag

- Location of Kráľovičove Kračany in the Trnava Region Location of Kráľovičove Kračany in Slovakia
- Coordinates: 47.99°N 17.55°E
- Country: Slovakia
- Region: Trnava Region
- District: Dunajská Streda District
- First mentioned: 1215

Government
  - Mayor: Wurczell Zoltán

Area
  - Total: 13.27 km^{2} (5.12 sq mi)
- Elevation: 117 m (384 ft)

Population (2025)
  - Total: 1,137

Ethnicity
  - Hungarians: 90,18 %
  - Slovaks: 8,69 %
- Time zone: UTC+1 (CET)
  - Summer (DST): UTC+2 (CEST)
- Postal code: 930 03
- Area code: +421 31
- Vehicle registration plate (until 2022): DS
- Website: www.kralovicovekracany.sk

Kráľovičove Kračany (Hungarian: Királyfiakarcsa, pronounced [ˈkiraːjfiɒkɒrtʃɒ]) is a village and municipality in the Dunajská Streda District in the Trnava Region of south-west Slovakia.

== Geography ==
The municipality lies at an altitude of 117 metres (384 ft) and covers an area of 13.27 km^{2} (5.12 sq mi) (2025).

== History ==
In the 9th century, the territory of Kráľovičove Kračany became part of the Kingdom of Hungary. In historical records the village was first mentioned in 1215 when King Andrew II of Hungary upon request of the archbishop of Esztergom acquitted a certain Zida, Algo, Bucha és Paul from the service at the Pozsony Castle and ordered them for the service of the archbishop together with their village recorded as „Corcha”. The name is recorded in 1349 as "Kyralfaia"”, while in 1353 as "Keralifiakarcha". The name means in Hungarian "Karcsa of the King’s son". According to the tradition, the inhabitants of the village were the descendants of the Korczán clan.

Until the end of World War I, it was part of Hungary and fell within the Dunaszerdahely district of Pozsony County. After the Austro-Hungarian army disintegrated in November 1918, Czechoslovak troops occupied the area. After the Treaty of Trianon of 1920, the village became officially part of Czechoslovakia. In November 1938, the First Vienna Award granted the area to Hungary which held it until 1945. After Soviet occupation in 1945, Czechoslovak administration returned and the village became officially part of Czechoslovakia in 1947.

== Population ==
Population statistic (10 years)
Year	1995	2005	2015	2025
Count	961	1057	1050	1137
Difference		+9.98%	−0.66%	+8.28%

Population statistic
Year	2024	2025
Count	1129	1137
Difference		+0.70%

It has a population of 1137 people (31 December 2025).

=== Ethnicity ===
Census 2021 (1+ %)
Ethnicity	Number	Fraction
Hungarian	883	80.78%
Slovak	206	18.84%
Not found out	67	6.12%
Total	1093	

In year 2021 was 1093 people by ethnicity 883 as Hungarian, 206 as Slovak, 67 as Not found out, 4 as Czech, 2 as German, 2 as Other, 1 as Italian, 1 as Rusyn and 1 as Polish.

Note on population: The difference values of population numbers in the table "Population statistic" and in the sections "Ethnicity" & "Religion" is caused by the use of various statistical methods.

=== Religion ===
Census 2021 (1+ %)
Religion	Number	Fraction
Roman Catholic Church	783	71.64%
None	192	17.57%
Not found out	67	6.13%
Calvinist Church	24	2.2%
Total	1093	

In year 2021 was 1093 people by religion 783 from Roman Catholic Church, 192 from None, 67 from Not found out, 24 from Calvinist Church, 10 from Greek Catholic Church, 6 from Evangelical Church, 3 from Paganism and natural spirituality, 2 from Jehovah's Witnesses, 2 from Other, 1 from Jewish community, 1 from Old Catholic Church, 1 from Christian Congregations in Slovakia and 1 from Ad hoc movements.
