= Géza Fejérváry =

Hungarian politician (1833–1914)

Baron Géza Fejérváry de Komlóskeresztes
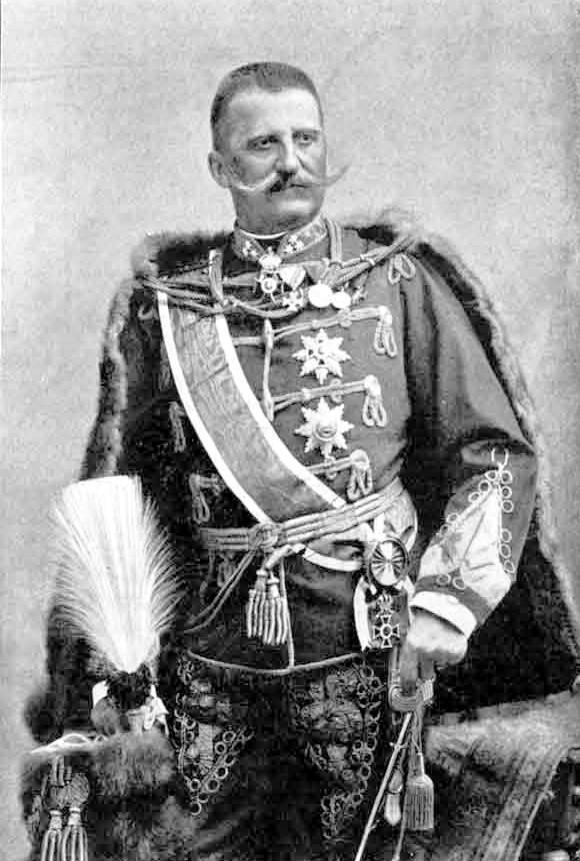

Prime Minister of the Kingdom of Hungary
- In office 18 June 1905 – 8 April 1906
- Monarch: Francis Joseph I
- Preceded by: István Tisza
- Succeeded by: Sándor Wekerle

Personal details
- Born: 15 March 1833 Josefstadt (today Fortress Josefov), Jaroměř (city), Kingdom of Bohemia, Austrian Empire (today part of the Czech Republic)
- Died: 25 April 1914 (aged 81) Vienna, Austria-Hungary
- Spouse: Sarolta Biedermann de Mosgó
- Children: Gizella; Imre; Olga; Irma

Baron Géza Fejérváry de Komlóskeresztes (15 March 1833 – 25 April 1914) was a Hungarian general who served as the prime minister in a government of bureaucrats appointed by King Franz Joseph during the Hungarian Constitutional Crisis of 1903–1907.

== Biography ==
He began his career in the army. As a captain in 1859, he was part of the Austrian forces opposing the Second Italian War of Independence and participated in an action on hotly contested heights of San Martino in front of Solferino. For his heroism in this, he won the cross of Maria Theresa – Austria-Hungary's highest military decoration. In 1864 fought against the Danes in the Second Schleswig War.

In 1872 Fejérváry became State Secretary in the Hungarian Ministry of National Defence (Honvéd) and Minister of National Defence in 1884. In 1895 he persuaded Franz Joseph to agree to the religious and political reforms of the Sándor Wekerle ministry. In 1903 he resigned, together with the prime minister, Kálmán Széll, owing to the rejection of a bill to increase the contingent of recruits, and was appointed captain of the Hungarian Life-Guards organized at that time.

Fejérváry was appointed premier 18 June 1905. The parliamentary majority declared that the Fejérváry ministry was unconstitutional, and organized a national opposition against it. Fejérváry nevertheless succeeded in settling these differences by the so-called Pactum, on the basis of which the Wekerle ministry was formed 8 April 1906. From this time onwards Fejervary's political activity ceased and he resumed his military career. On the death of Prince Esterházy, Captain of the Hungarian Royal Guard, Fejerváry was appointed his successor.

He died of cancer of the tongue.

== Notes ==
Political offices
Preceded by Béla Orczy	Minister of Defence; 1884–1903	Succeeded by Dezső Kolossváry
Preceded by László Szőgyény-Marich	Minister besides the King; Acting; 1892	Succeeded by Lajos Tisza
Preceded by András Bethlen	Minister of Agriculture; Acting; 1894	Succeeded by Andor Festetics
Preceded by Gyula Andrássy the Younger	Minister besides the King; Acting; 1895	Succeeded by Sámuel Jósika
Preceded by István Tisza	Prime Minister of Hungary; 1905–1906	Succeeded by Sándor Wekerle
Preceded by Károly Khuen-Héderváry	Minister besides the King; 1905–1906	Succeeded by Aladár Zichy
Preceded by László Lukács	Minister of Finance; Acting; 1905–1906	Succeeded by Ferenc Hegedűs
