= János Zichy =

Hungarian politician (1868–1944)

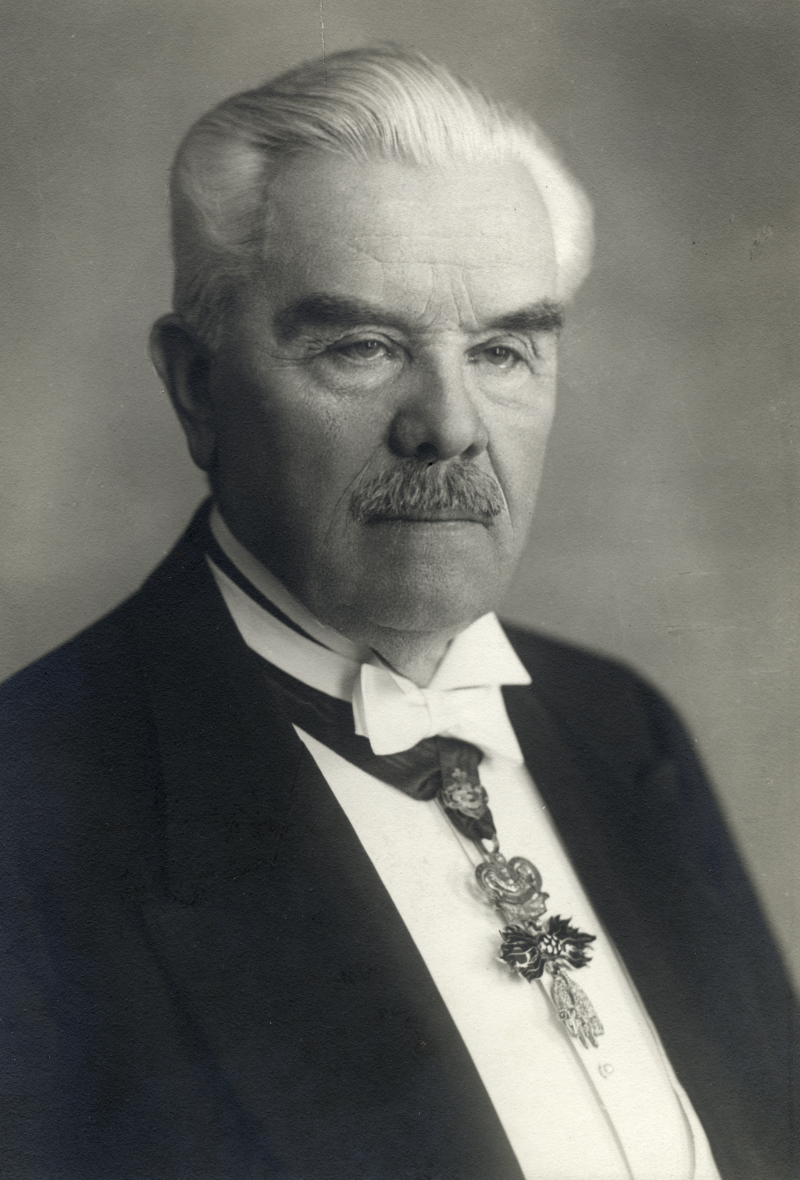

Minister of Religion and Education of Hungary
- In office 1 March 1910 – 26 February 1913
- Prime Minister: Károly Khuen-Héderváry; László Lukács
- Preceded by: Ferenc Székely
- Succeeded by: Béla Jankovich
- In office 8 May 1918 – 31 October 1918
- Prime Minister: Sándor Wekerle
- Preceded by: Albert Apponyi
- Succeeded by: Márton Lovászy

Personal details
- Born: 30 May 1868 Nagyláng, Austria-Hungary
- Died: 6 January 1944 (aged 75) Nagyláng, Kingdom of Hungary
- Party: Catholic People's Party, Constitution Party, Party of National Work, Catholic Economical and Social Party
- Spouse: Margit Zichy
- Children: János; Pál; György
- Profession: politician
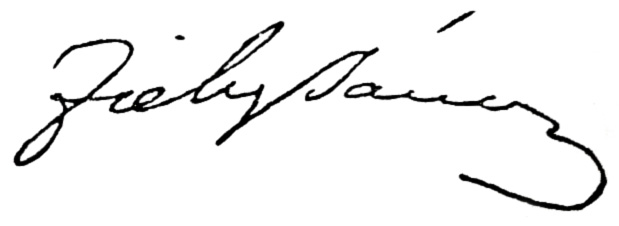
- Signature

Count János Zichy de Zich et Vásonkeő (30 May 1868 – 6 January 1944) was a Hungarian politician, who served as Minister of Religion and Education between 1910–1913 and in 1918. He was a member of the House of Magnates from 1894. He was the chairman of the Catholic People's Party for many years, but he resigned in 1903. He joined the Constitution Party in 1906. When the party collapsed, he became a member of the Party of National Work.

During the Hungarian Soviet Republic he participated in the movements against the communists. In 1922, he was elected to the Diet of Hungary. Zichy was a legitimist politician, he founded the legitimist Christian Economic and Social Party (KGSZP). He was a member of the Hungarian Academy of Sciences.

== Sources ==
- Profile, Magyar Életrajzi Lexikon. Accessed 7 March 2024.

Political offices
Preceded by Ferenc Székely	Minister of Religion and Education; 1910–1913	Succeeded by Béla Jankovich
Preceded by Albert Apponyi	Minister of Religion and Education; 1918	Succeeded by Márton Lovászy
