= Béla Jankovich =

Hungarian politician (1865–1939)

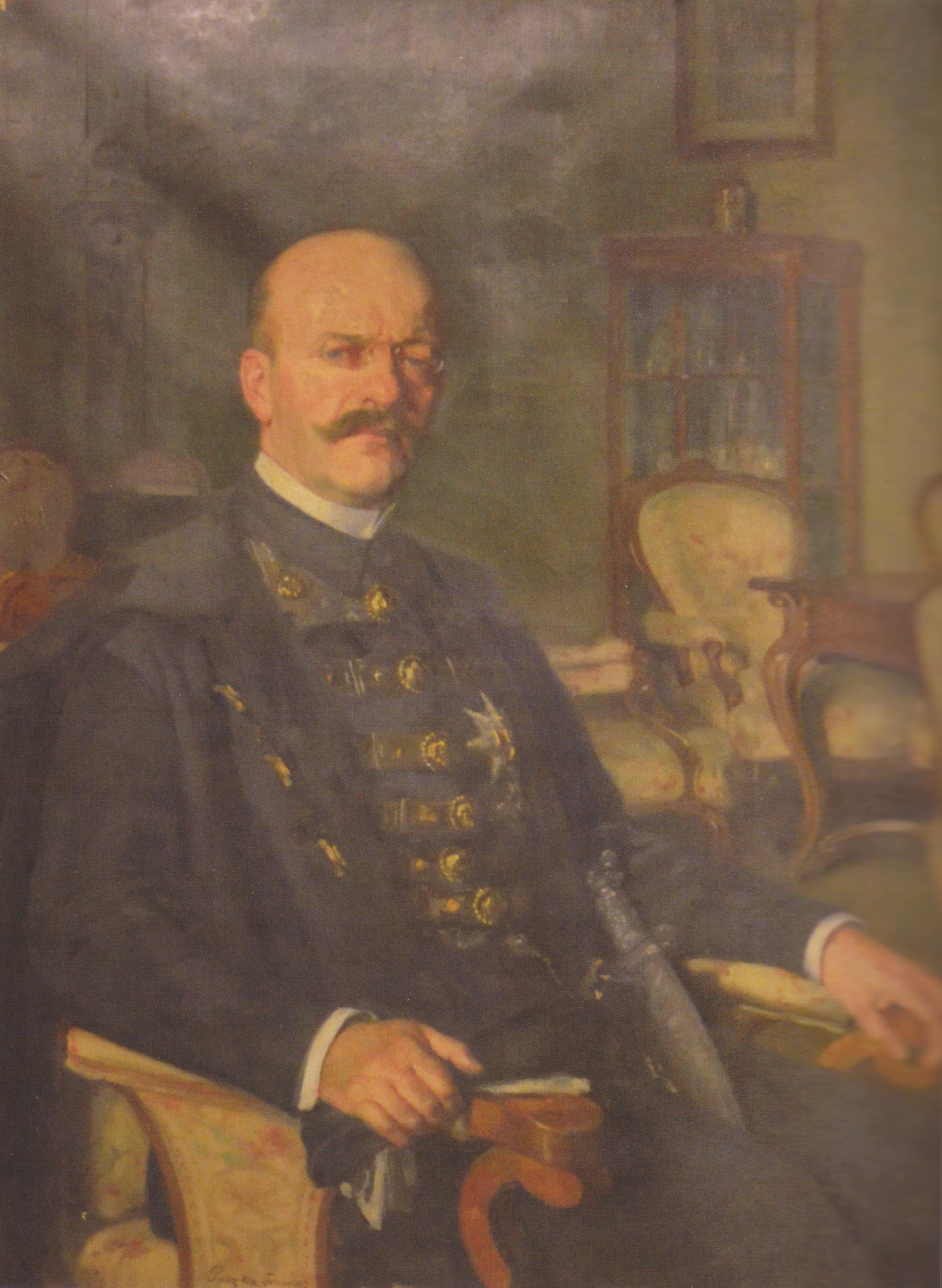

Minister of Religion and Education of Hungary
- In office 26 February 1913 – 15 June 1917
- Prime Minister: István Tisza
- Preceded by: János Zichy
- Succeeded by: Albert Apponyi

Personal details
- Born: 29 April 1865 Pest, Kingdom of Hungary
- Died: 5 August 1939 (aged 74) Budapest, Kingdom of Hungary
- Party: Party of National Work
- Profession: politician, economist

Béla Jankovich de Vadas et Jeszenicze (29 April 1865 – 5 August 1939) was a Hungarian politician, who served as Minister of Religion and Education between 1913 and 1917. He studied in the Theresianum of Vienna, University of Budapest, University College London and Albert Ludwig University of Freiburg. Between 1891 and 1893 he travelled around the world, he went to the United States, to China and Japan. After his returning to home he farmed on his possessions of Tésa.

Jankovich became a member of the House of Representatives in 1910 in the colours of the Party of National Work. Between 1911 and 1913 he served as second deputy speaker of the lower house. He was appointed privy councillor in 1912. Before his ministerial appointment he worked as state secretary of the Ministry of Religion and Education for less than two weeks. Then László Lukács appointed him minister on 26 February 1913. Jankovich held this position until the resignation of the István Tisza cabinet.

More educational reforms are connected his name, onto the defiance for the First World War and the economic crisis. His laws directed the state, denominational and privacy kindergartens' legal status. He extended the free education: school councils were created, which checked the efficiency of the teaching, the school attendance and the compulsory education. The ministry organized the secondary schools with a specialisation in the sciences. They acknowledged the Islamic religion legally. Jankovich used mathematical methods as an economist between the first ones to economic analyses. He was corresponding member of the Hungarian Academy of Sciences.

Political offices
Preceded by János Zichy	Minister of Religion and Education; 1913–1917	Succeeded by Albert Apponyi
