= Ferenc Varga =

Ferenc Varga may refer to:

- Ferenc Varga (sculptor) (1906–1989)
- Ferenc Varga (athlete) (1925–2023)
- Frank Varga or Ferenc Csaba Varga (1943–2018), Hungarian-American sculptor
- Ferenc Varga (singer), (singer), finalist on Megasztár

== See also ==
- Ferenc Vargha
