= Timko =

Timko is the surname of the following notable people:

- Imre Timkó (1920–1988), Hungarian Greek Catholic hierarch
- Jaroslav Timko (born 1965), Slovak football player
- Milan Timko (born 1972), Slovak football player
- Predrag Timko (born 1949), Yugoslav handball player
- Zoltán Timkó (1874–1946), Hungarian jurist
