= Károly Szíjártó =

Hungarian jurist (1927–2014)

Károly Szíjártó (26 January 1927 – 21 September 2014) was a Hungarian jurist, who served as Chief Prosecutor of Hungary between 1975 and 1990.

Legal offices
Preceded by Géza Szénási	Chief Prosecutor; 1975–1990	Succeeded by Kálmán Györgyi
