= Ferenciek tere =

Square and junction in Budapest, Hungary

Coordinates: 47°29′35.05″N 19°3′21.55″E

Ferenciek tere (English: Square of the Franciscans) is a square and junction in Budapest. In addition to being the site of a station on the M3 (North-South) line of the Budapest Metro, it is an important public transport junction for the BKV bus line number 7, which connects Pest and southern Buda.

The place is right in the middle of the city. The fashionable shopping avenue Váci utca opens from there. The square hosts an internationally recognized gourmet restaurant and a bookstore-publisher complex for Roman Catholic religious literature. The Erzsébet Bridge over the Danube is a five-minute walk from the Metro.

== History ==
The square is the site of the Inner City Franciscan Church, first built in 1743, for which it gets its name. The square was formally named Kígyó tér in 1874, then renamed Apponyi tér (for Albert Apponyi) in 1921, then Felszabadulás tér (Liberation Square) in 1953, then its earlier name of Ferenciek tere in 1991.

== Gallery ==
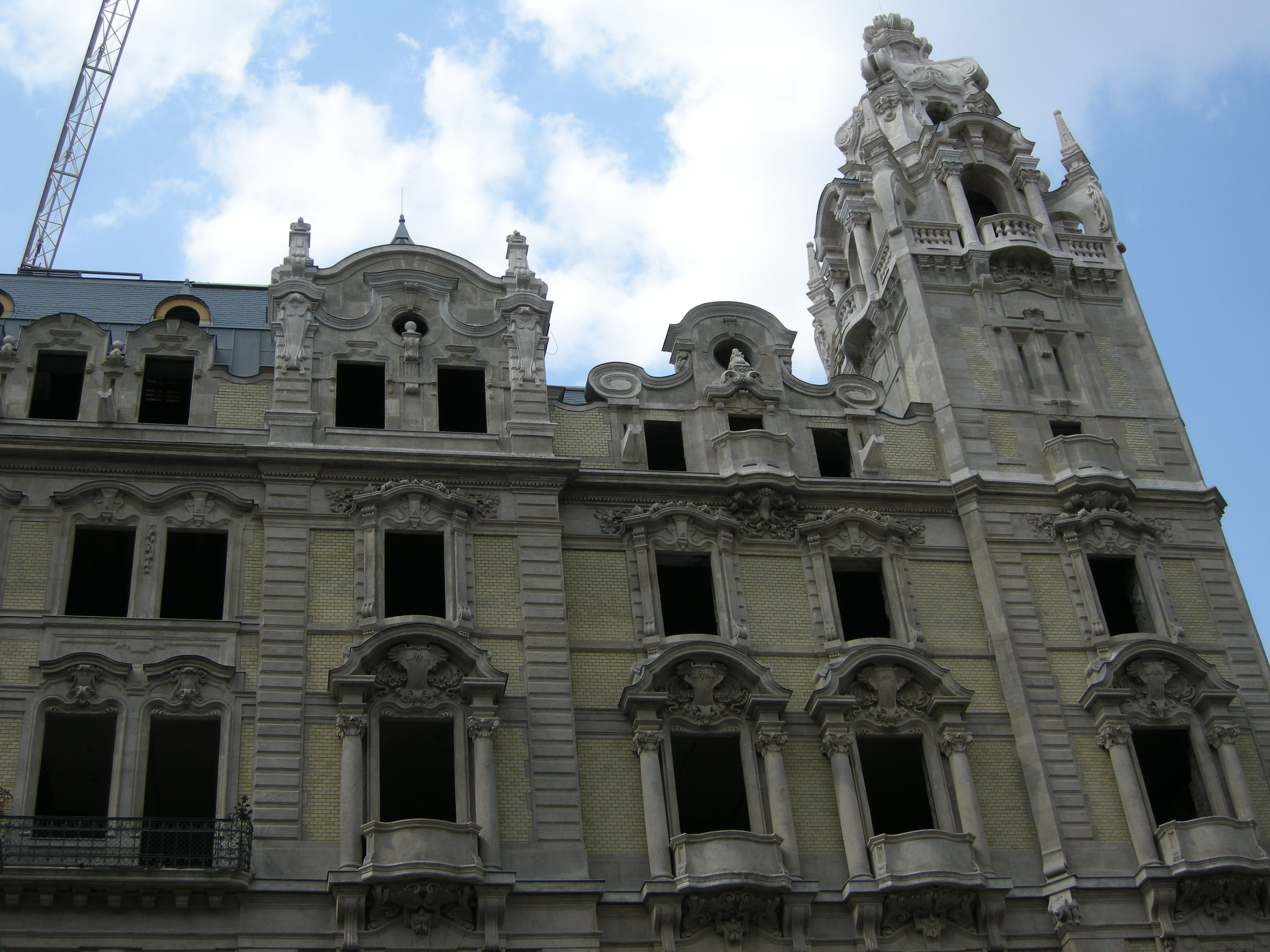

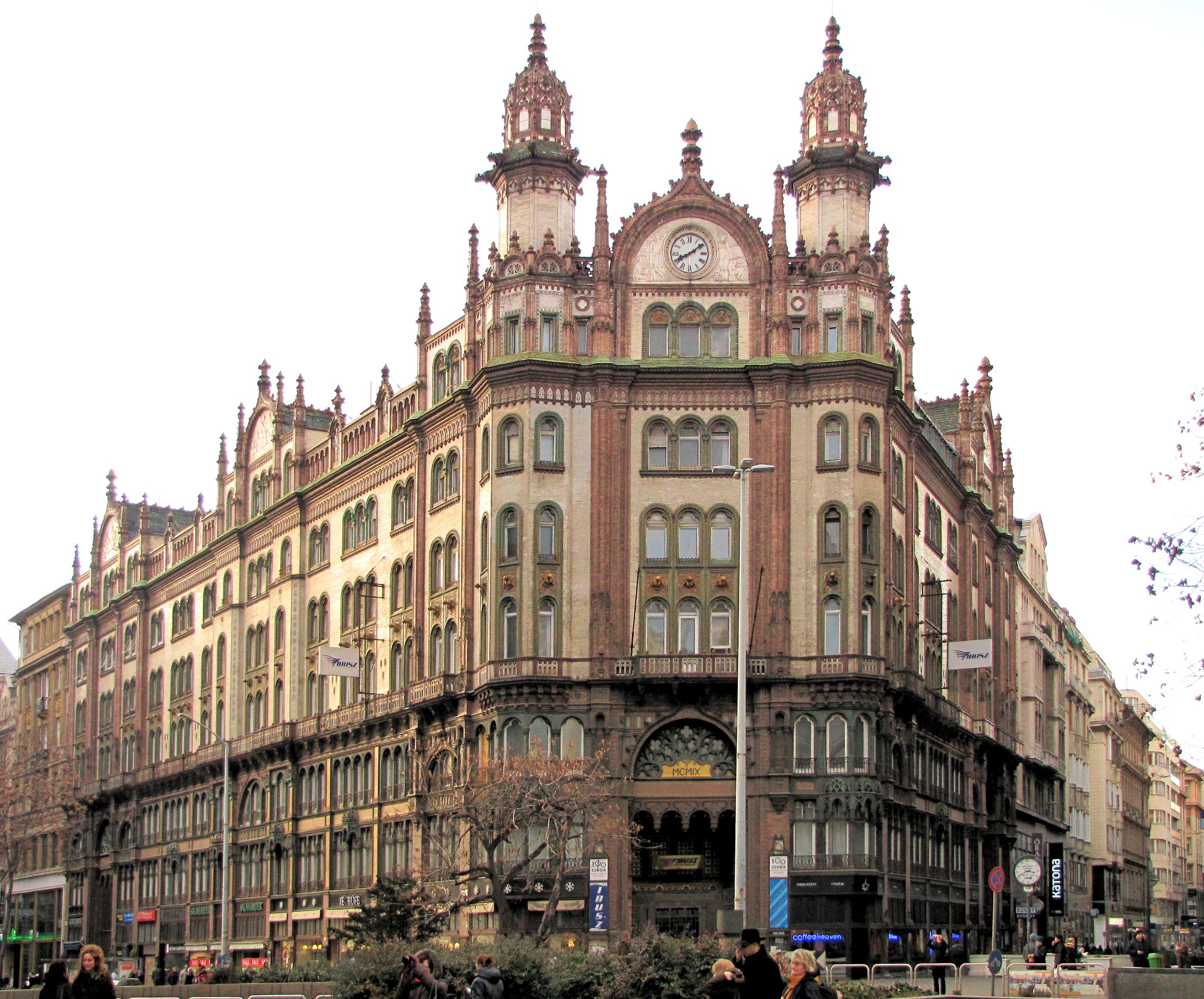
Párizsi-udvar
