= Albert Apponyi =

Hungarian politician (1846–1933)

Count Albert Apponyi de Nagyappony
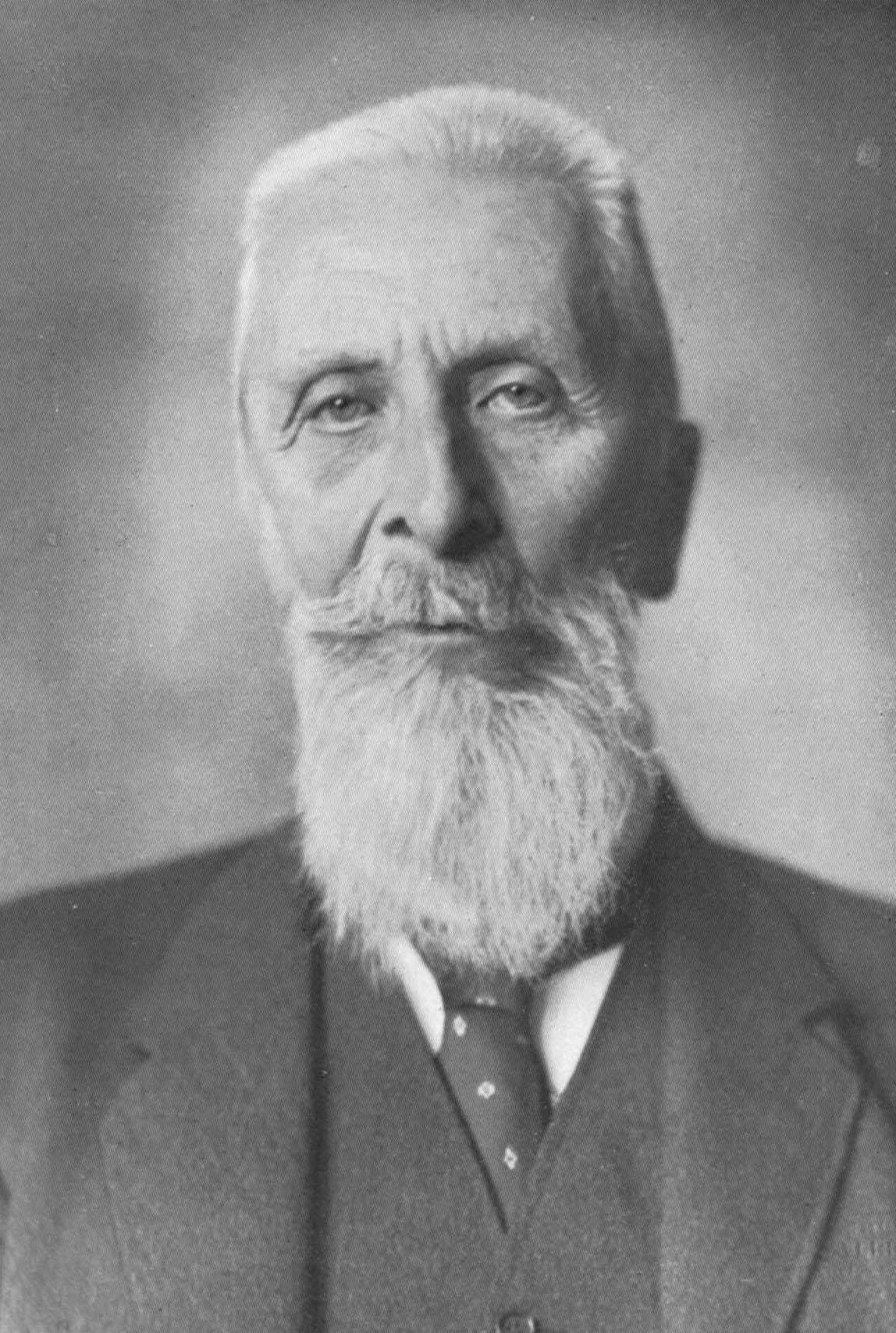
- Apponyi in 1910 (photograph by Ferenc Veress)

Minister of Religion and Education of Hungary
- In office 8 April 1906 – 17 January 1910
- Prime Minister: Sándor Wekerle
- Preceded by: Gyula Tost
- Succeeded by: Ferenc Székely
- In office 15 June 1917 – 8 May 1918
- Prime Minister: Móric Esterházy; Sándor Wekerle
- Preceded by: Béla Jankovich
- Succeeded by: János Zichy

Personal details
- Born: 29 May 1846 Vienna, Austrian Empire
- Died: 7 February 1933 (aged 86) Geneva, Switzerland
- Party: Deák Party, Liberal Party, National Party, Party of Independence and '48
- Spouse: Clotilde von Mensdorff-Pouilly (m. 1897)
- Children: György Alexander; Mária Alexandrina; Julianna
- Profession: Politician

Albert György Gyula Mária Apponyi, Count of Nagyappony (Hungarian: Gróf nagyapponyi Apponyi Albert György Gyula Mária; 29 May 1846 – 7 February 1933) was a Hungarian aristocrat and statesman. Apponyi sat in the Hungarian Parliament for an almost-uninterrupted period between 1872 and 1918, during which he served several times as a minister and became an advisor to the Imperial and Royal court in Vienna. After the defeat of Austria-Hungary in World War I, Apponyi led the Hungarian delegation to the Treaty of Trianon, the outcome of which he vehemently protested, and became Hungary's representative to the League of Nations. Remembered as one of the foremost Hungarians of his time, Apponyi's staunch, eloquent nationalism and advocacy for Magyarization made him extremely popular among Hungarians, but earned him few friends among the Kingdom's linguistic minorities.

He was a board member of the Hungarian Academy of Sciences, Chairman of Saint Stephen's Academy from 1921 to 1933, and a knight of the Austrian Order of the Golden Fleece from 1921. He was nominated for Nobel Peace Prize five times.

== Early life ==
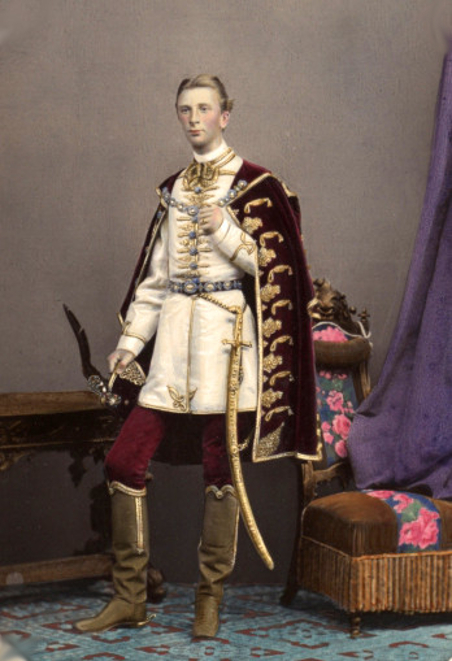
21 years old Albert Apponyi.

Albert Apponyi was born on 29 May 1846, in Vienna, where his father, Count György Apponyi, was the resident Hungarian Chancellor at the time. He belonged to an ancient noble family dating back to the 13th century. His mother, Countess Júliane Sztáray de Nagymihály et Sztára (1820-1871) was also member of an equally old Hungarian nobility.

While other Hungarian aristocrats like István Széchenyi or Lajos Batthyány had to learn Hungarian separately in the aristocratic world of the time, Albert Apponyi grew up in a conservative Apponyi family with Hungarian as his mother tongue, but he mastered several Western European languages from an early age.

He was educated at the Jesuit institute in Calxburg (Lower Austria) until 1863, after which he studied law in Pest and Vienna. After completing his studies, he spent a long period (1868 to 1870) abroad, as was customary at the time, mainly in Germany, England and France, where he was introduced to the royalist aristocracy. Among the French aristocrats he was particularly influenced by Count Charles de Montalembert. It was at his house that he met Pierre Guillaume Frédéric Le Play, the famous conservative sociologist whose work was to have a major influence on his intellectual development. Despite owning a villa in London, he mostly spent time with the British royal family in the Buckingham Palace due to his close friendship to Queen Victoria and Edward VII.

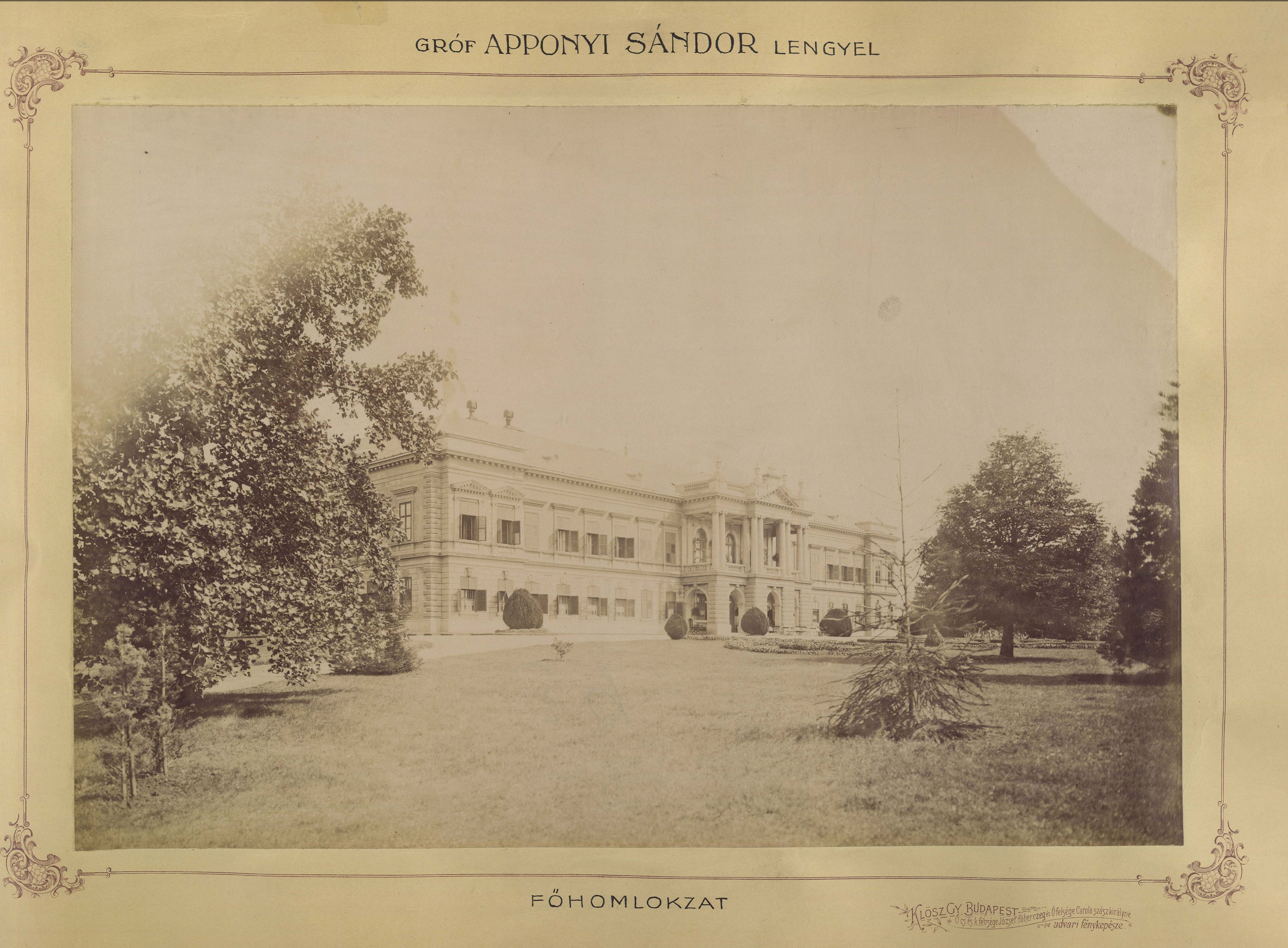
Apponyi Castle at Lengyel

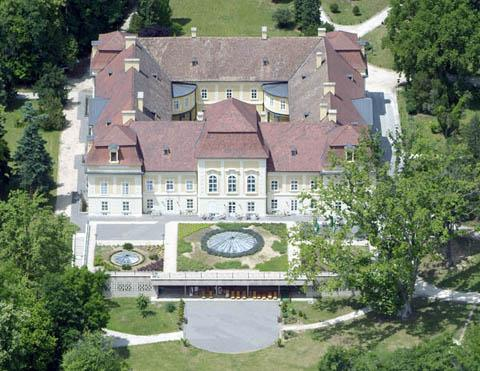
The Apponyi Castle at Hőgyész

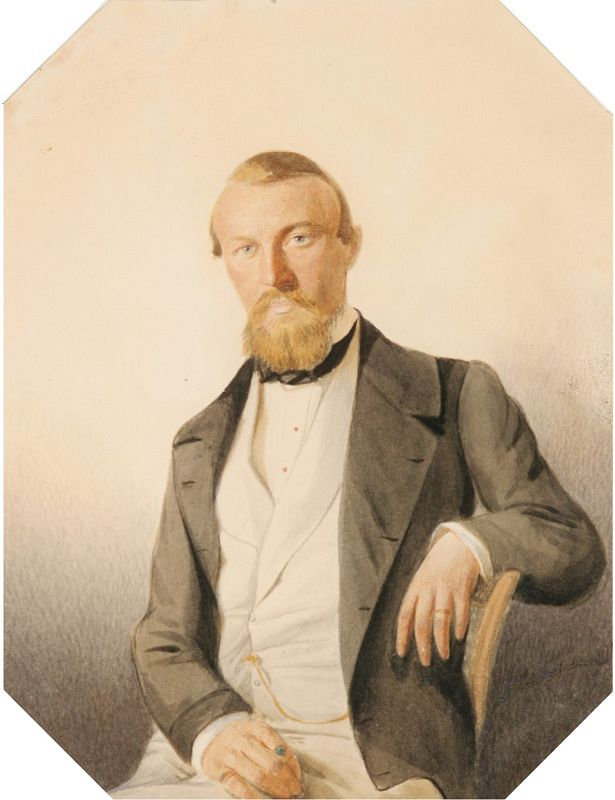
Barabás Portrait of Albert Apponyi

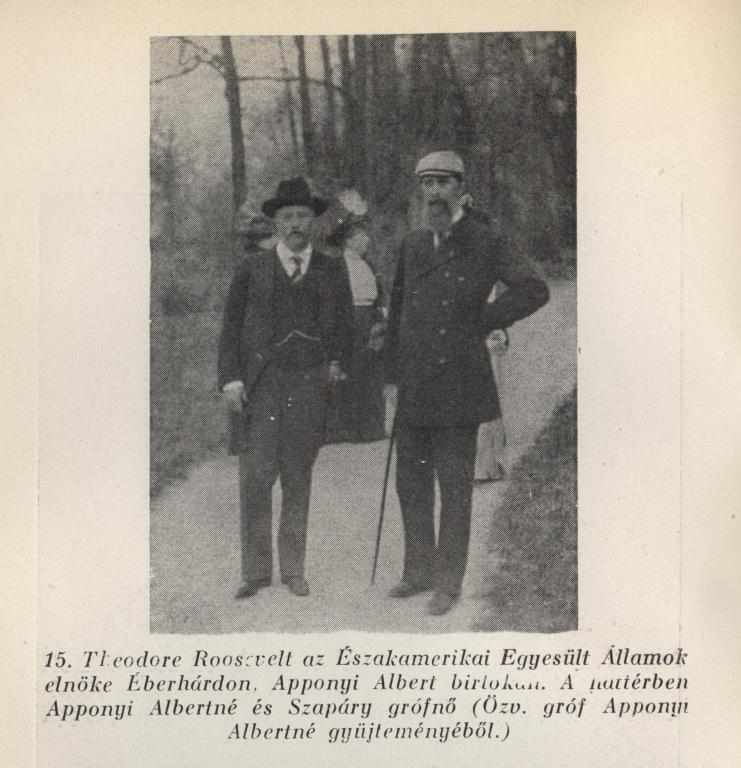
President Roosevelt visited Count Apponyi in Eberhard on 17th of April 1910

Beyond his talent as an orator and fluency in six languages, Albert Apponyi had wide-ranging interests outside politics, encompassing philosophy, literature, and especially music and religion, namely Roman Catholicism. He visited the United States three times, first in 1904 and last in 1924, where he engaged in lecture tours and befriended leading public figures, including Presidents Theodore Roosevelt and William Howard Taft. He also visited Egypt twice, including in 1869 when he was invited to the inauguration of the Suez Canal.

He owned the family castle in Éberhard, (now Malinovo, Slovakia), where he entertained guests including Theodore Roosevelt during his tour of Europe in 1910. Roosevelt described Apponyi as "an advanced Liberal in matters political but also in matters ecclesiastical" and "like an American Liberal of the best type."

He considered his first political activity to be the role he once played alongside Ferenc Deák as a university student, when he was present as an Italian interpreter at a meeting with a delegation from Dalmatia.

== Marriage and family ==
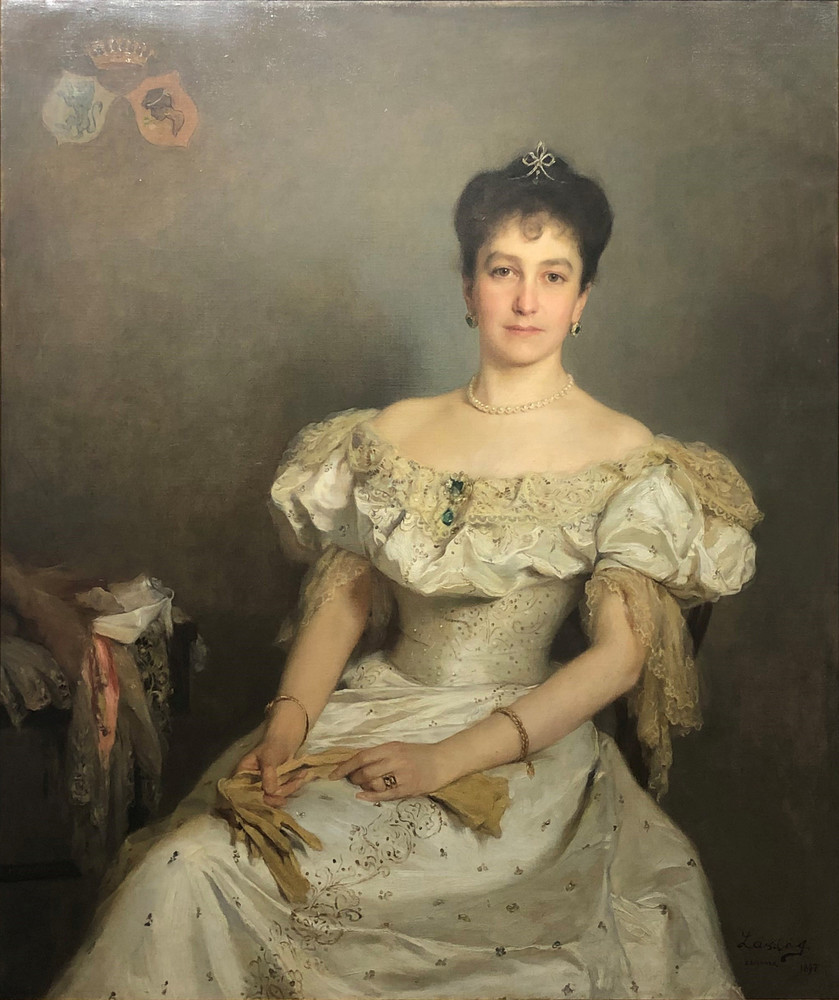
Portrait of his wife, Countess Klothilde Wilhelmine von Mensdorff-Pouilly-Dietrichstein, by Philip de László, 1897

Count Albert Apponyi married to the women's rights activist Countess Clotilde von Mensdorff-Pouilly in Vienna on 1 March 1897. Their children:

- Count György II Alexander Apponyi (Éberhárd, 30 June 1898 – Saarbrücken, West Germany, 7 August 1970), politician, member of the Parliament, journalist.
- Mária Alexandrina (Éberhárd, 29 May 1899 – Salzburg, 3 July 1967); marriage: Budapest, 29 June 1933 to Prince Karl de Rohan (9 January 1898 – 17 March 1975)
- Julianna (Budapest, 9 November 1903 – Paris, 17 January 1994); 1st husband: (1924, divorced: 1934) Count Ferenc Pálffy (30 August 1898); 2nd husband: (1943, divorced: 1947) Elemér Klobusiczky (Debrecen, 20 August 1899 – Budapest, 25 February 1986)

== Political career ==
Count Albert Apponyi became a member of the Hungarian Parliament in 1872 and remained a member almost uninterrupted until his death.

Returning home from his travels abroad, he soon found himself in the thick of the political life of the time. In 1872, he was elected as a member of the Hungarian Parliament for the first time, and after that he was a member of the Hungarian legislature until his death, practically without interruption. He won his first mandate in the district of Szentendre as a member of the platform of Ferenc Deák. "Everyone greeted me with a certain curiosity", he writes in his memoirs of his first appearance in the House of Representatives, "but few with sympathy. The left considered me the offspring of the conservatives, the liberal Deák supporters saw me as the representative of an ultramontane action'. Curiosity was soon replaced by warm interest, however, because his oratory skills were a sensation from the very first time he spoke (in the detailed debate on the 1873 budget, he spoke in favour of the establishment of a National Academy of Music).

In the general elections of 1875 – the terms of the Parliament were then still three years – he lost the elections in three places: in Kőszeg, in a district of Bačka and in an Oláh district of Transylvania, as you write: he failed in the elections, if not from the Carpathians to the Adriatic, but from the Vág to the Olt, from the Danube to the Tisza. Only in 1877 was he elected – but this time unanimously – in the now vacant Bobró district in the county of Árva county, on the platform of the conservative Sennyey party. Until then, he represented that party's position in the upper House of the parliament (House of Magnates).

After the retirement of Baron Pál Sennyey (1878), when his conservative party, Dezső Szilágyi's extraordinary party group and the Independent Libertarian Party merged to form the united (moderate) opposition ("the mortar party", as Gyula Verhovay called it), he joined it, and his abilities made him a leader in this party after Dezső Szilágyi's departure. His party took the name of the National Party in October 1892, and remained under that name until February 1900, when it merged with the Libertarian Party. In 1889, he led all opposition parties in the debate on the development of the memorable army, demanding the assertion of the national rights guaranteed by the Compromise. This struggle broke the fifteen-year reign of Prime Minister Kálmán Tisza, and his fall soon followed (1890).

Tisza's successor, Prime Minister Gyula Szapáry, was initially supported by Apponyi, but he turned against him when, instead of the original bill on administrative reform, he would have settled for a law stating that public administration was a state function. He then went into permanent opposition when Szapáry asked for and received a provisoire in October 1891 to dissolve parliament. The dissolution was carried out, but the opposition, and with it the National Party, emerged stronger from the electoral struggle, which in 1892 was conducted in an exile situation. Szapáry was defeated in the same year, and Apponyi played no small part in his downfall.

=== Advisor to Franz Joseph ===
A serious and long crisis ensued, during which Franz Joseph sought Apponyi's opinion, and which ended with the appointment of Baron Dezső Bánffy, then Speaker of the House of Representatives, as Prime Minister on 17 January 1895. Bánffy invited Apponyi to formal merger talks, but these ended inconclusively, as Bánffy made the merger conditional on the renunciation of national military requirements.

It was in this year that Count Albert Apponyi first appeared in the Inter-Parliamentary Union. The conference was held in Brussels, and Bánffy initiated the strong participation of the Hungarian parliament, because in connection with the upcoming millenary celebrations of the Hungarian state, he wanted to invite the conference to be held the following year to Budapest, and a great battle was expected to develop around this invitation. The Hungarian delegation succeeded brilliantly: Budapest was accepted as the venue for the next conference by a majority of votes, with only five votes against.

Towards the end of the year the opposition, led by Apponyi, was again at war with the government. Apponyi was so taken by the idea of the upcoming millenary celebrations that on Christmas Day he proclaimed a "treuga Dei" in his party's organ, the National Newspaper. However, 1896 had not yet ended when Apponyi's fight against Bánffy began again, as the government resorted to all means of violence and corruption in the general elections of that year. Apponyi was merciless in his scourging of abuses and public corruption in the newspapers, and then turned against him over the so-called 'Ischl clause'. However, he still did not participate in the resulting parliamentary filibuster, because he considered it "medicina pejor morbo" (medicine is worse than death). The fight ultimately led to Bánffy's downfall.

The government of Kálmán Széll followed. Apponyi came to an agreement with Széll and joined the Libertarian Party with his party. Shortly afterwards, the 1901 Diet elected him president, and in the same year he became a de facto internal privy councillor to the king. Before the 1903 recruitment bill was discussed, he presented his military programme, calling for the implementation of the so-called national concessions, but he agreed to postpone the issue until the new law on defence was implemented. For this reason, he did not approve of the Independence Party's obstruction of the recruitment bill, but as president he conducted the House's often stormy negotiations objectively and urged the delegations that came to see him to maintain their confidence in Parliament. After Széll's resignation on 1 July 1903, in order to stop the obstruction, he resigned his presidency and made a speech in favour of parliamentary peace, but the obstruction continued until Khuen-Héderváry's second resignation, and when the Libertarian Party had to take a stand on military issues, Apponyi became a member of the Committee of Nine sent to draw up the party's new military programme.

Apponyi was inclined towards the opposition: although he did not succeed in asserting his position, he remained in the Libertarian Party until it became clear that he could not realise his military demands in that party. His intention to leave was matured by the parallel meetings decided by the majority, which were aimed at violently breaking down the obstruction. On 26 November, he therefore left the party, having already resigned the presidency on 3 November. He was followed by members of the former National Party, with whom he has now re-formed the National Party. This party was sixty-seven strong, but it was particularly close to the Independence Party on the military question and agreed with the Independence Party on the question of the house rule revision planned by István Tisza, which brought the house rule revision into line with a substantial extension of the right to vote.

=== Leader of the opposition ===
Apponyi was now the leader of the opposition in the struggle against the revision of the constitution, and on 18 November 1904 he declared on behalf of the whole opposition that he would never recognise the validity of the revision forced by the majority. This was followed that same evening by the memorable Perczel handkerchief vote. The fight went on. Apponyi joined the alliance of opposition parties (allied opposition) and the government hired bits and pieces to defend the lex Daniel (new house rules). The final big confrontation followed: on 13 December, the opposition beat up the bits and smashed up the Chamber. István Tisza responded by dissolving the House, although the next year's budget had not yet been voted.

Apponyi, thoroughly disillusioned with the politics of the 60 weeks, joined the Independence Party at the end of the year. He led the 1904/1905 winter election campaign, which ended in a resounding victory for the opposition (26 January 1905). The opposition had thus become a majority, but was not yet in government. Attempts to mediate with the king were fruitless. The Fejérváry government came to power and the serious internal political crisis was complete. Finally, on 23 September, the king invited the leaders of the allied opposition, including Apponyi, who was the leader of the national resistance and who, in order to counteract the plans of József Kristóffy, Minister of the Interior, advocated a broad extension of suffrage.

On 8 April 1906, the so-called pact between the Crown and the allied opposition was finally reached, by ruling out the military question, and Apponyi took over the cultural ministry in the Second Wekerle Government, appointed on 9 April under the presidency of Sándor Wekerle. His party alone won an absolute majority (61.26%) in parliament in the elections of 11 April, which confirmed this, and together with his coalition partners won almost 87% of the seats.

=== "Apponyi laws" ===
As the minister of education of the conservative-led government from 1906 to 1910 he drafted the laws passed in 1907, known as Apponyi laws or Lex Apponyi, in which the process of Magyarization culminated. However, the incentives started in 1879, until then Hungarian had not been prescribed or even to be taught by any means. Reading, writing and counting in selected primary schools was introduced in Hungarian for the first four years of education. The Hungarian Government claimed all citizens should be able to understand, speak and write in the state language at a basic level, being a necessity deserving of support. These laws caused various forms of resentment from the ethnic minorities.

Eventually, the law prescribed the teaching of Hungarian in all schools without Hungarian education, whether the pupils' mother tongue was Hungarian or not, ignoring parents' claims that Hungarian education could be provided privately. If the number of pupils with Hungarian-mother tongue reached 20% of the total number of pupils in a school, Hungarian education had to be provided. However, in case the total number of pupils whose mother tongue was Hungarian exceeded 50%, the language of all education had to be changed to Hungarian with the proviso that education to pupils with non-Hungarian mother tongues could still be provided.

The teachers got a grace period – 3–4 years – in order to learn the language. Schools which could not provide teachers able to deal with the Hungarian-language had to be closed. Approximately 600 Romanian villages were left without education as a result of the law.

=== Leader of the Independence and '48 Party ===
He was now leading the Kossuth Party in the opposition struggles, which, given the government's means at the time, certainly did not lead to breathtaking scenes in the House of Representatives. After the death of Ferenc Kossuth in 1914, he became the party's president. At the outbreak of the First World War, the opposition and the government were at their fiercest. Apponyi was again the one who initiated the reconciliation of the parties, so that by breaking down the partitions, the whole public opinion would stand united behind the government in the struggle that was forced upon the country.

The Treuga Dei lasted until 1916. At that time the opposition, seeing the great mistakes that had been made in the conduct of foreign affairs and military affairs, demanded that it should be allowed greater influence in the conduct of these affairs. The king and the government acceded to this demand, and the opposition gave Apponyi, jr. Gyula Andrássy Jr. Rakovszky István Jr. However, the then Foreign Minister, Baron István Burián, was so dismissive of the committee when it appeared in Vienna that all three resigned their mandates at an open session of the House of Representatives.

The fight in the Chamber of Deputies now revolved around the right to vote. Apponyi was one of the first to call for a democratic extension of suffrage after the great blood sacrifices made by the Hungarian people in the war. István Tisza, the prime minister, refused to give in, but when the manuscript of Charles IV on suffrage appeared in April 1917, Tisza's position was shaken and he was soon forced to resign. Apponyi was Minister of Culture in the subsequent Esterházy government and then in the third Wekerle government, which lasted two years during the war.

Unilingual schools	Hungarian	Non-Hungarian
1869	5818	6355
1880	7342	6052
1905	11664	3246

Multilingual schools	Hungarian	Non-Hungarian
1869	1455	1784
1880	2287	2437
1905	1598	1620

== Interwar Period ==
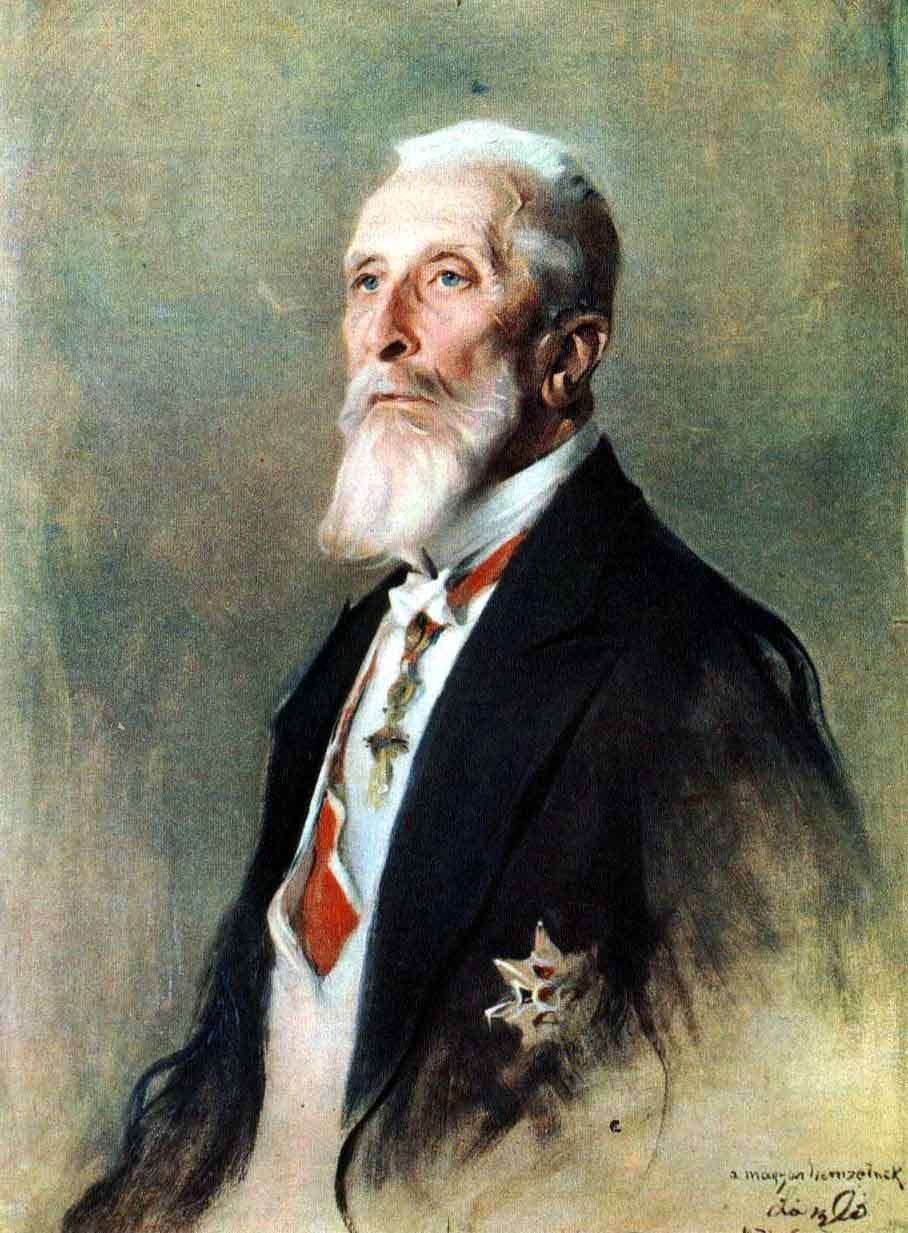
Albert Apponyi

=== Károlyi government and the Hungarian Soviet Republic ===
During the regime of Mihály Károlyi, he completely withdrew from public life, and after the proclamation of Hungarian Soviet Republic, he was forced to flee from Hungary. The Reds did not allow him to leave the capital by rail: he fled by carriage and hid for a time in Fejér County and other parts of the Danube region, until he finally managed with great difficulty to cross the Danube to his estate in Éberhard. He lived there even after the collapse of the Communist Party and only returned home in November 1919, when his presence was indispensable in the unfolding negotiations initiated by Sir George Clark of the British Foreign Office's Oriental Department, the Entente's chief envoy in Budapest. Asked about his understanding of the Christian nationalist tendency then prevailing, he replied that his Christianity knew neither sectarian hatred nor racism, and that persecution was not a policy.

He had been a strong participant in the unfolding negotiations for the formation of a government of concentration, and had already appeared to be forming the new government, when this combination was thwarted at the last moment by opposition to Christian-National unification. On 18 November, at the last inter-party conference held under Clark's chairmanship, Károly Ereky, the Minister of Public Food in the Friedrich government, said on behalf of that party that he would not support an Apponyi government. "At last an honest word!" – Apponyi replied and left the meeting.

=== Paris Peace Conference ===
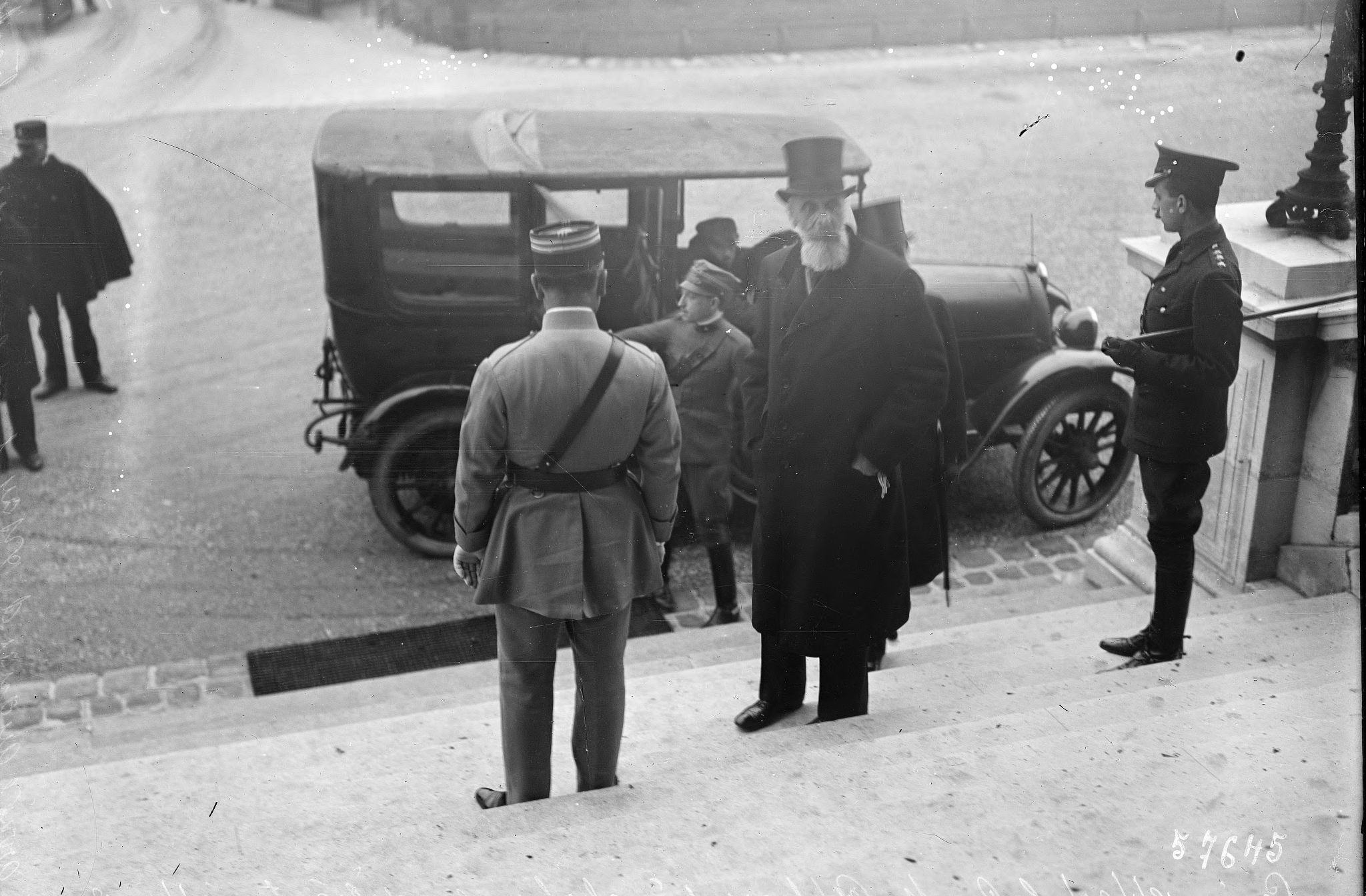
Albert Apponyi, top-hatted, in front of the Quai d'Orsay, January 1920.

After World War I, Apponyi's most notable public office was his appointment in late 1919 to lead the Hungarian delegation to the Paris Peace Conference to present Hungary's case to the Allied and Associated Powers assembled there to determine the terms of the peace treaty with Hungary, which subsequently became known as the Treaty of Trianon on account of it having been signed in the Grand Hall of the Palace of Trianon.

Albert Apponyi on 16 JANUAR, 1920 "Yet, should Hungary be placed in a position when she must choose between the acceptance or refusal of this peace, then, as a matter of fact, her choice lies in the question: should she commit suicide simply in order to escape a natural death?"

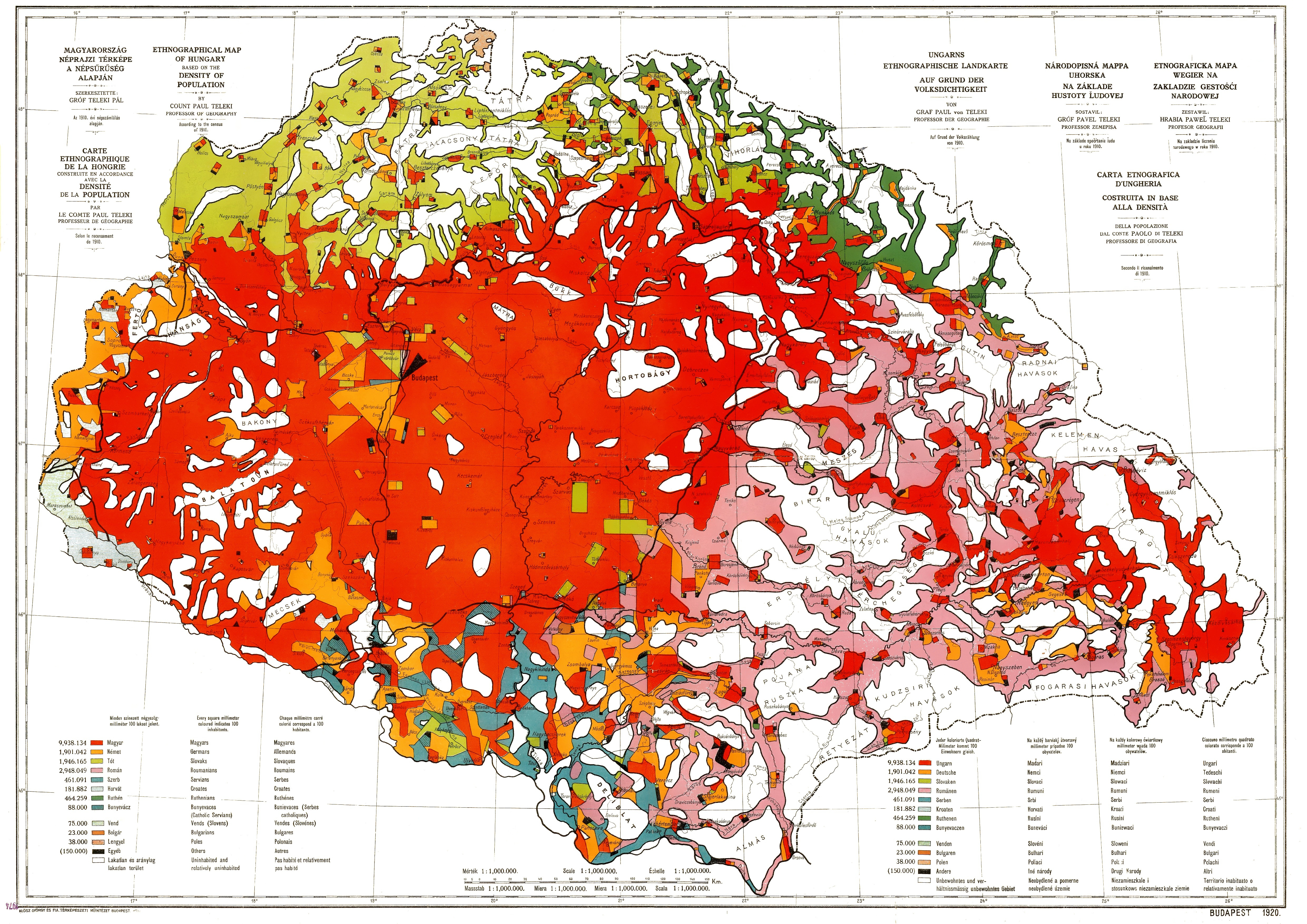
The Carte Rouge, a map used by Apponyi in his presentation on 16 January 1920.

Apponyi's mission culminated in a speech to the negotiators at the Quai d'Orsay on 16 January 1920, which he delivered in French, simultaneously translated himself into English, and concluded in Italian.

Aponyi tried to convince the decision makers about the importance of democratic referendums about the disputed borders:

In the name of the great principle so happily phrased by President Wilson, namely that no group of people, no population, may be transferred from one State to the other without being first consulted – as though they were a herd of cattle with no will of their own – in the name of this great principle, an axiom of good sense and public morals, we request and demand a plebiscite in those parts of Hungary which are now on the point of being severed from us. I declare that we are willing to bow to the decision of a plebiscite, whatever it should be.

This performance was widely acclaimed but remained eventually fruitless as the Allies refused to amend the terms of the peace treaty, or even to discuss them with the Hungarian delegation. Even so, Apponyi's reputation in Hungary was enhanced by the episode and he came close to being chosen as provisional head of state, a position that however went to Miklós Horthy on 1 March 1920.

After leading the Hungarian delegation at the Paris Peace Conference, he remained active in politics and diplomacy, as an opposition member of Parliament, legitimist advocate of the Habsburgs as Kings of Hungary, and regular representative at the League of Nations.

=== The Horthy era ===
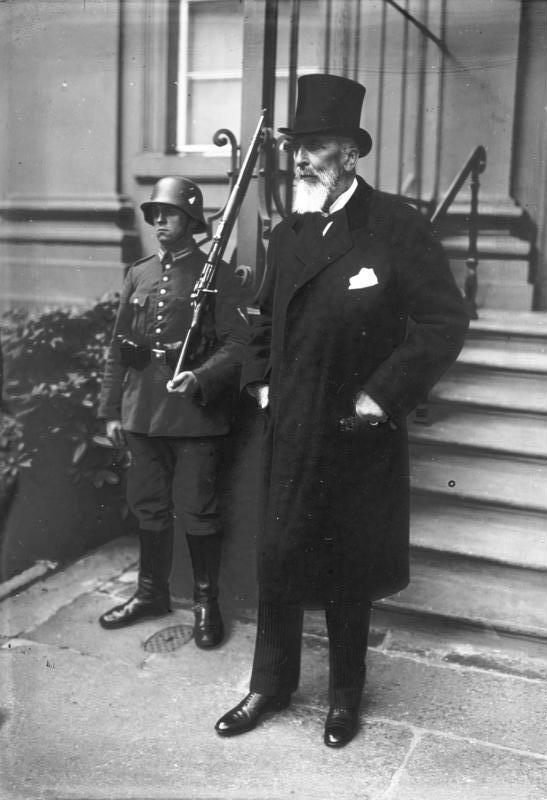
Albert Apponyi on a visit in Berlin to meet president Paul von Hindenburg, 1928.

In May 1921, he celebrated his seventy-fifth birthday, and with it the fiftieth anniversary of his public life. On this day of his life, he was the subject of an overflowing celebration. The National Assembly devoted its sitting of 27 May to him, and two speeches were made on that occasion alone: a welcome speech by István Rakovszky, then Speaker of the House, and Apponyi's magnificent words of thanks. On the following day, in the St. Stephen's Basilica and in the Pesti Vigadó, Governor Miklós Horthy, the capital, the army and the entire public of the country celebrated the "greatest living Hungarian", who thanked the unanticipated and unlooked-for celebration with noble simplicity and wonderful modesty. On the occasion of the celebration, the capital city of Budapest elected him an honorary citizen and erected a commemorative plaque in the square named after him – today Ferenciek Square.

A few weeks later, he was in Geneva, where he participated with much success in the conference of the Union of the League of Nations, held in early June. On that occasion, he visited King Charles IV in Hertenstein, who made him a Knight of the Order of the Golden Fleece.

Charles IV's appearance in Hungary on 20 October was unexpected for Apponyi, who was not privy to the King's intentions. He did not meet with him until 1 November in Tihany, where he travelled with Count Miklós Szécsen, former ambassador to the Vatican, with the government's permission. This meeting, together with the tragedy that had taken place in the space of a few days, had a shattering effect on Apponyi, and there was talk in political circles at the time that he would resign his mandate and retire from public life under the impact of the events. But this did not happen: on the contrary, he opposed the dethronement proposal with all his energy, and in his speech to the National Assembly on 3 November he vehemently protested against the King's surrender to the enemy. At the end of his speech, he read out the declaration of the legitimists that the dethronement proposal constituted a break with the ancient constitution and was legally invalid. After the declaration was read out, Apponyi left the chamber with the Legitimist MEPs.

In the last session of the National Assembly, when the House was in a fever of suffrage and the complication seemed to be beyond resolution, Apponyi proposed that the National Assembly should address a note to the Governor stating that, in the event of the failure to enact the electoral law, new elections could be held only on the basis of the Friedrich electoral law. On 16 February, during the last session of the National Assembly, he took the petition and its proposal to the Governor, accompanied by Baron József Szterényi and Tivadar Homonnay, who declared before the three of them that he would neither commit nor tolerate any illegality. The National Assembly was dissolved on 16 February, and the opposition's Constitutional Defence Committee, which had been formed that day, elected Apponyi as its president. He took part in the election campaign with a vigour unusual for his age, speaking in six places in a single day, all with great success. He was himself re-elected by his old, loyal district of Jászberény.

He was the early president of the second National Assembly, but did not attend the opening ceremony (7 June 1922) because of his public concerns. At the beginning of his term he took a very reserved position and rarely spoke out. The reason for this was his political isolation and, as he said in a speech in Jászberény on 20 October 1921, the fact that he could not identify with the government or with the opposition, whose right to overthrow the government he said he could only recognise if he was able to take responsibility for it. He made a number of eye-catching speeches in the National Assembly, which, if his views did not prevail, always had a profound effect on the members of the House.

His position in favour of the Reconstruction proposals on 15 April 1924 and his major speech against the revision of the House rules on 3 December of the same year are memorable. In the latter speech, he declared that the majority could not be recognised as representative of the national will as long as elections were based on the principle of public voting. Also in the electoral law debate (24 May 1925), he argued, among other things, that 'either we accept secret ballot or we do not want the real will of the electorate to be expressed', and he argued that he saw a great and disheartening decline in the middle classes compared with the spirit of the pre-1948 era. He also made a major speech (18 March 1926) on the Franco controversy. This speech was an almost classic example of the objectivity that is so much obliged on political opponents. He stated that the House could not decide on the question of political responsibility until the court had delivered its verdict in the forgers' trial. His position on constitutional law was best expressed in his speech in the debate on the Upper House Bill.

His domestic political statements outside the National Assembly mainly revolved around the question about the person of the king. From the very beginning, he was of the opinion that "there is no question of a king, because Hungary has a legitimate king who is prevented by force majeure from being crowned." He stated on several occasions, including in Körmend on 21 June 1925, that the principle of the continuity of law is expressed first and foremost in the adherence to the legitimate kingdom, that is, in the cult of the ancient constitution, from which loyalty to the king is an integral part of our historical traditions and living legal consciousness, and that the restoration of the legitimate kingdom is the best, and perhaps the only, chance for Hungarian democracy.

On another occasion (Székesfehérvár, 6 June 1926), he stressed that the legitimists were not planning any action to make their principles a reality; the time for this would come only when it would be possible without endangering the existential interests of the nation. He made another important statement on the king question, after the opening of the National Assembly in 1927. He then outlined the relationship of legitimacy to national kingship, saying that the advocates of legitimate kingship were in the public position laid down in the late King Charles' former proclamation. In this proclamation, addressed to the nation after the King's first attempt to return to power, the following basic statements were made: 'the provisions of the pragmatica sanctio concerning common possession and mutual defence have been rendered null and void, and therefore the King will never use the military and financial power of Hungary to assert his claims on other countries; if divine providence should ordain that he should rule over other countries, this circumstance will never in the least affect the independence of Hungary as a state, either from the military or from the foreign policy point of view. "

During the five years of the Second National Assembly and the years that followed, the focus of Apponyi's activities fell on foreign policy. On several occasions he represented Hungary and the government before the League of Nations and made a major contribution to improving Hungary's image.

== League of Nations ==
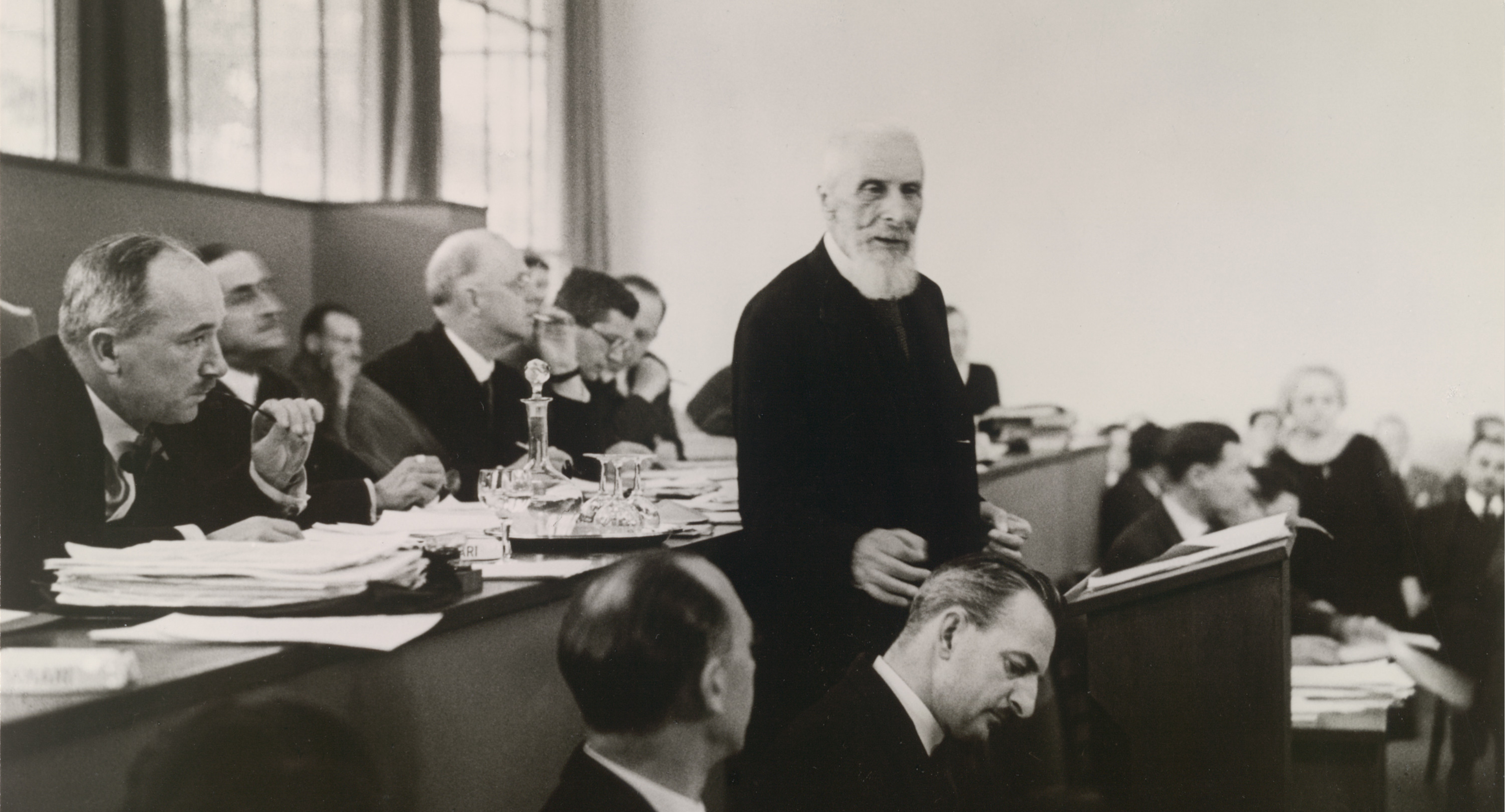
Apponyi at Geneva

In July 1923, the issue of the former Hungarian landowners in Transylvania was on the agenda of the Council of the League of Nations. Romania, under the pretext of the Transylvanian land reform, expropriated the lands of the Transylvanian landowners who had moved to Hungary without any compensation, and the Hungarian government protested against this to the League of Nations. On behalf of the government, Apponyi then presented the Hungarian position in a powerful exposé, and proposed that the matter be referred to the Permanent International Tribunal in The Hague. The council, however, postponed the resolution of the question and the serious and complicated problem it raised. The question, which from then on was known as the "Optánsperper" in the national and world public opinion, later, especially from 1927 onwards, gave rise to great complications.

In the autumn of 1924, Apponyi was the head of the Hungarian delegation to the General Assembly of the League of Nations. At the meeting on 9 September he made a powerful speech on the minority problem and the question of disarmament. He stressed that the League of Nations was dealing with the minority question in an unsatisfactory manner, and then went on to say that this was precisely why minorities should be given the right to submit their complaints directly to the council, which should be obliged to refer all cases to the Permanent International Tribunal. On the question of disarmament, he said that general disarmament was a prerequisite for the disarmament of the vanquished States, and that a fully disarmed Hungary had the right to demand the fulfilment of this condition.

He made a major speech at the General Assembly of the League of Nations in the autumn of 1925, during the negotiation of the Security Pact. In his introduction, he recalled the great merits of the League of Nations High Commissioner Smith in the field of Hungarian reconstruction, and then he uttered the phrase which has become a byword, that just as the unknown soldier, so the unknown Hungarian taxpayer, by his heroic sacrifice, has earned the recognition of the League of Nations. He then presented his motion on the question of minorities, the essential content of which was that the complaints of minorities in church and school matters should be heard compulsorily, and in accordance with the rules of adversarial procedure, that the expert opinion of the Permanent International Tribunal should be obtained in all such cases, and that the autonomy of the large number of minorities living in one place should be achieved.

Finally, he proposed that the League of Nations should immediately begin preparations for a general disarmament conference. Apponyi's speech had an extraordinary impact. There was a clear perception among the members of the Conference and the international press present that Apponyi's speech was one of the most significant events of the session, yet his motion was not adopted by the relevant sub-committee to which he was referred for consideration.

Representing Hungary in the League of Nations was by no means the end of Apponyi's foreign policy activities during this period. Abroad, he was known as Hungary's representative statesman and one of the world's greatest orators, as eloquent in English, French, Italian and German as he was in Hungarian. He was the keynote speaker of the Hungarian group at the Inter-Parliamentary Union conferences and represented his country on many important issues with much success. He has also written extensively in foreign reviews and newspapers in the past, explaining Hungary's special position in the monarchy, arguing and promoting its rights and aspirations.

He was particularly successful in America: his speeches there evoked the memory of Lajos Kossuth in American public opinion. In the autumn of 1923 he travelled to the United States at the invitation of American universities; he left on 19 September and returned on 10 December. At that time, several American statesmen, teachers, businessmen and industrialists tried to keep the United States interested in Europe and remind it of its responsibility for the destiny of humanity. For this reason, it was also considered necessary to make the American public aware of the situation in Central Europe, and Apponyi was invited to lecture on this subject. He spoke in New York, Chicago and many other cities in the US and Canada. He lectured on the problem of Central Europe, but he also presented the Hungarian question very forcefully, with the persuasive force of the truth he represented, leaving a deep impression on public opinion with his engaging lectures. His journey was a real triumph. By this journey, as by many others, he contributed greatly to improving the world's opinion of Hungary.

On the occasion of his eightieth birthday, the National Assembly wanted to give him a big celebration, but he refused with grateful thanks. But the country still showered him with a thousand testimonies of its love, affection and gratitude. His American admirers presented him with a gold medal, and the United States itself greeted him by telegram. He spent his birthday in Gyöngyösapáti, where, after the Czechs had expropriated his ancestral estate in Eberhard, he founded a new family estate.

Apponyi, however, could not rest in the ninth decade of his life: a new great task awaited him, and he took up it with great enthusiasm. For three years he represented Hungary before the League of Nations in the optants' case, which had long been a matter of world and national public opinion. From 19 September 1927, when the matter was brought before the League of Nations, until the beginning of 1930, when the Hague Conference, which finally decided the matter, began, this question formed the backbone of his foreign policy work. It was an almost uninterrupted battle against the tactics of the League of Nations, the bias of Neville Chamberlain, the ideology of the victors and the Balkan methods of Nicolae Titulescu, in which he brilliantly used his legal training and legal acumen, which had been little in evidence in his career, and his diplomatic flair, which on more than one occasion saved situations that had seemed lost. If Bethlen managed to achieve often criticised but nevertheless satisfactory results in The Hague and Paris on this issue, it was largely due to his own achievements. This struggle for law and justice was most eloquently appreciated by Hungarian lawyers when, on 29 November 1929, Apponyi, 'the great lawyer of the nation', was elected a member of the Budapest Bar Association with great ceremony.

He also continued to fight for Hungary as the Hungarian government's chief delegate in Geneva. His two speeches at the Assembly of the League of Nations at this time are particularly noteworthy. One was delivered on 10 September 1929, when, pointing out the absurdity and untenability of the Treaty of Trianon and citing a lifetime of experience, he warned the world's powers that "nothing is eternal in the political world", and the other on 20 September 1930, putting forward new perspectives and powerful arguments in defence of national minorities.

At the 1930 General Assembly of the League of Nations, moreover, he was honoured by the election of his wife as chairman of the Social Committee. This caused a sensation throughout the world at the time, because it was the first time that the General Assembly had elected a woman delegate to the chairmanship of a committee. Apponyi's prestige and popularity in international politics now rivalled that of the best-known and greatest foreign statesmen. The great respect in which he and, through him, Hungary were held by the League of Nations is best shown by the fact that when the Union of League of Nations held its General Assembly in Budapest in May 1931, the opening session of the Congress on 26 May, on the occasion of his approaching 85th birthday, was devoted almost entirely to his celebration.

On his travels abroad he was always and everywhere received with the respect due to him, even in official circles, and on such occasions he was often able to render valuable services to his country, as on 5 October 1929, when he gave a lecture on the situation of Hungary at the Diplomatic Academy in Paris, and in May 1931, when he delivered a highly successful lecture on the situation of Hungary in Vienna. His reports on his travels appeared in the Budapest Hírlap, Pester Lloyd and several major foreign newspapers.

On the occasion of his 85th birthday, foreign politicians showered him with greetings in Hague, including Lord Rothermere, Austrian Chancellor Otto Ender, British Foreign Minister Henderson, Italian Foreign Minister Grandi and German Foreign Minister Curtius.

In the House of Representatives, elected in the summer of 1931, he naturally took his seat again with a mandate from Jászberény. This time, the town of Jászberény, which he had represented in the House for 50 consecutive years, presented him with a letter of credentials engraved in gold.

== Death and legacy ==
A Message to America by Count Apponyi (1929) film footage

Albert Apponyi died on 7 February 1933 in Geneva, Switzerland, where he had come to speak at the re-opening of the World Disarmament Conference. On the orders of the Swiss Federal Council, his coffin was taken to St Joseph's Church and from there to Notre-Dame in Geneva. Delegates from the League of Nations were present at the funeral service. On behalf of Switzerland, the former President of the Republic, Giuseppe Motta, paid his last respects. Such was his stature among survivors of the Austro-Hungarian Monarchy that Otto von Habsburg made a short trip from Belgium to Geneva for the sole purpose to lay a wreath on his bier. The coffin was then taken to the railway station, from where it arrived in Budapest on Saturday morning.

After transfer to Budapest, his body was left lying in state under the cupola of the Hungarian Parliament Building, then following a special act of parliament was buried on 14 February 1933 in the crypt of Matthias Church, the church where he used to come and pray every morning before breakfast while living nearby on Buda Castle Hill since 1902.

At five o'clock in the afternoon, the Parliament held a mourning session. The funeral service was conducted by Prince Primate Serédi.

Attendants at the state funeral included Regent Miklós Horthy, Prime Minister Gyula Gömbös and Archbishop Serédi. A four-meter-diameter laurel wreath was sent by Benito Mussolini, whom Apponyi had met and admired, and the quasi-legendary Horn of Lehel was brought from his constituency in Jászberény where it was (and still is) kept in the local museum. In 1938, however, following the First Vienna Award, his old domain at Éberhárd became part of Hungary again, and his remains were reburied in the family chapel there.

Apponyi's death was widely mourned in the world press. The press in Europe and other continents covered the death of Albert Apponyi in detail:

- Popolo d'Italia and other Italian newspapers,
- Manchester Guardian wrote an editorial on the death of the Hungarian statesman,
- The Daily Mail, which described the deceased as the greatest statesman of our time,
- The Times paid a very warm tribute to Apponyi,
- The Daily Telegraph describes how Apponyi fought the war, but could not decide who to side with in the battle between German and Slavic ambitions, and ended up choosing the Germans, so the Slavs confiscated most of his land,
- According to the Morning Post, Apponyi was the most popular campaigner against the peace treaties,
- Deutsche Allgemeine Zeitung puts him alongside Stresemann and Briand in terms of greatness,
- The Prager Tageblatt says that Albert Apponyi was a human monument,
- The American, Swiss and French newspapers, Petit Parisien and Figaro, also wrote about Apponyi with deep sympathy.

By the American and British media, he was often called as "The Grand Old Man of Central Europe". In Hungary he was named as "The Greatest Living Hungarian". His memory, however, is less positive in Slovakia and Romania where his name is associated with the Apponyi laws and Magyarization.

Between 1911 and 1932, he was five times nominated for the Nobel Peace Prize by Hungarian universities, scientists and political groups, but never became a laureate.

He was the subject of national celebration on the occasion of his seventy-fifth birthday in May 1921, when he was made an honorary citizen by numerous Hungarian cities and towns. This is also when Ferenciek tere, a major intersection in Budapest, was renamed Apponyi tér in his honor. (It was rechristened Felszabadulás tér, meaning Liberation Square, by the Communist authorities in 1953.) Many Hungarian cities and towns still have an Apponyi street (Apponyi utca, sometimes Gróf Apponyi Albert utca) or Apponyi square (Apponyi tér) in his memory. There is also an Apponyi Street in Fairfield, Connecticut, a town that was home to many Hungarian immigrants in the early 20th century.

A bust of Albert Apponyi by sculptor Géza Maróti was dedicated in 1939 in Jászberény, the seat of his parliamentary constituency for many decades. It was presumably destroyed during the Communist era. A new bust, by local sculptor György Máté, was dedicated in 1996.

A collection of Herend Porcelain is named after Albert Apponyi, who is said to have custom-ordered the collection's design.

A plaque on the Buda Castle Hill house which Apponyi inhabited from 1901 or 1902 until his death, Werbőczy (now Táncsics Mihály) street 17, honors his memory and that of his son György, a liberal politician who was arrested by the Gestapo and briefly deported to Mauthausen in March 1944 for his opposition to the persecution of Hungarian Jews.

== Works (selected) ==
In 1931 he started working on a collection of essays that was published in 1935 after his death as The Memoirs of Count Apponyi. In these, among other themes, he describes his encounters with Franz Liszt and Richard Wagner, his audiences with Popes Pius IX and Pius XI as well as with Benito Mussolini, his impressions of Egypt and America, and his role during the 1920 sequence that led to the Treaty of Trianon. One of his earlier books was titled Esthetics and Politics, the Artist and the Statesman.

- 1889: Parlamentarismusunk veszedelme, őszinte szó Apponyi Albert Grófról. Budapest
- 1895: Aesthetika és politika, művész és államférfiu (Esthetics and Politics, the Artist and the Statesmen), Budapest
- 1896: Apponyi Albert gróf beszédei. 2 vols. Budapest
- 1908: A Brief Sketch of the Hungarian Constitution and of the Relations between Austria and Hungary. Budapest
- 1909: Hungary of to-day. London
- 1911: Lectures on the Peace Problem and on the Constitutional Growth of Hungary: lectures. Budapest: St. Stephen's Printing Press
- 1912: Magyar közjog osztrák világitásban. Budapest
- 1915: Austria-Hungary and the War, New York: Austro-Hungarian Consulate-general. Co-authors: Albert Apponyi, Ladislaus Hengelmüller von Hengervár, Konstantin Theodor Dumba, Alexander Nuber von Pereked
- 1919: The american peace and Hungary. Budapest
- 1921: Hungarian foreign policy. London, New York, Budapest
- 1922: Ötven év, ifjukorom--huszonöt év az ellenzéken. Budapest: Pantheon irodalmi intézet r.-t
- 1922: Emlékirataim. Ötven év Apponyi Albert gróf. Második, átnézett kiadás. 2 vols. Budapest, 1922, 1934.
- 1925: Gróf Apponyi Albert hét előadása a magyar alkotmány fejlődéséről. Budapest
- 1928: Justice for Hungary: review and criticism of the effect of the Treaty of Trianon. 376 p. London: Longmans, Green (one of several contributors)
- 1935 (posthumous): The Memoirs of Count Albert Apponyi. The MacMillan Company, New York.

== Ancestors ==
Count Albert György Apponyi de Nagy-Appony's ancestors in three generations
Count Albert György Apponyi de Nagy-Appony	Father: Count György Apponyi de Nagy-Appony	Paternal Grandfather: Count György Apponyi de Nagy-Appony	Paternal Great-grandfather: Count Antal György Apponyi de Nagy-Appony
Count Albert György Apponyi de Nagy-Appony	Father: Count György Apponyi de Nagy-Appony	Paternal Grandfather: Count György Apponyi de Nagy-Appony	Paternal Great-grandmother: Countess Maria Karolina von Lodron-Laterano-Castelromano
Count Albert György Apponyi de Nagy-Appony	Father: Count György Apponyi de Nagy-Appony	Paternal Grandmother: Countess Anna Zichy de Zich et Vásonkeö	Paternal Great-grandfather: Count Ferencz Zichy de Zich et Vásonkeö
Count Albert György Apponyi de Nagy-Appony	Father: Count György Apponyi de Nagy-Appony	Paternal Grandmother: Countess Anna Zichy de Zich et Vásonkeö	Paternal Great-grandmother: Countess Maria Anna Kolowrat-Krakowsky
Count Albert György Apponyi de Nagy-Appony	Mother: Countess Juliánna Sztáray de Nagy-Mihály et Sztára	Maternal Grandfather: Albert Sztáray de Nagy-Mihály et Sztára	Maternal Great-grandfather: Mihály Sztáray de Nagy-Mihály et Sztára
Count Albert György Apponyi de Nagy-Appony	Mother: Countess Juliánna Sztáray de Nagy-Mihály et Sztára	Maternal Grandfather: Albert Sztáray de Nagy-Mihály et Sztára	Maternal Great-grandmother: Mária Anna Eleonora Eszterházy de Galántha
Count Albert György Apponyi de Nagy-Appony	Mother: Countess Juliánna Sztáray de Nagy-Mihály et Sztára	Maternal Grandmother: Franziska Károlyi de Nagykároly	Maternal Great-grandfather: József Károlyi de Nagykároly
Count Albert György Apponyi de Nagy-Appony	Mother: Countess Juliánna Sztáray de Nagy-Mihály et Sztára	Maternal Grandmother: Franziska Károlyi de Nagykároly	Maternal Great-grandmother: Maria Elisabeth Johanna von Waldstein-Wartenberg

Political offices
Preceded by Dezső Perczel	Speaker of the House of Representatives; 1901–1903	Succeeded by Dezső Perczel
Preceded by Gyula Tost	Minister of Religion and Education; 1906–1910	Succeeded by Ferenc Székely
Preceded by Béla Jankovich	Minister of Religion and Education; 1917–1918	Succeeded by János Zichy
