= Gyula Tost =

Hungarian politician

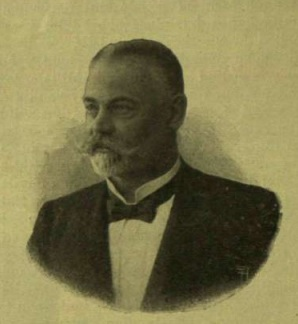

Minister of Religion and Education of Hungary
- In office 6 March 1906 – 8 April 1906
- Prime Minister: Géza Fejérváry
- Preceded by: Albert Berzeviczy
- Succeeded by: Gyula Tost

Personal details
- Born: 16 November 1846 Bányavölgy, Kingdom of Hungary, Austrian Empire (today Duplín, Slovakia)
- Died: 24 October 1929 (aged 82) Budapest, Kingdom of Hungary
- Party: Liberal Party
- Profession: politician, jurist

Gyula Tost de Bányavölgy (16 November 1846 – 24 October 1929) was a Hungarian politician, who served as Minister of Religion and Education in 1906. He was member of the Diet of Hungary between 1872 and 1878.

== Family ==
József Tost (born 1745): imperial gardener, the designer of the park of the Schönbrunn Palace. He had four children: Antal, Károly and Vencel stood into the palatine's service. The fourth child, Albert Tost continued his father's activity at the imperial palace.

- Antal Tost: gardener of the Buda Castle, during the Hungarian Revolution of 1848 he died of cholera, when the Hungarians besieged the castle.
- Vencel Tost: gardener of the "Palatine's Garden".
- Károly Tost (died 1852): gardener of the Alcsút Palace and of the Margaret Island. His son, József continued his work.
- Ferenc Tost (1875–1933): gardener, founder of the National Association of the Hungarian Trading Gardeners.
- Barnabás Tost (1876–1951): member of the House of Magnates, parson of Kassa. He was one of the founders of the Christian Socialist Party. He was expelled from Czechoslovakia and was interned at Hejce.
- László Tost (1875–1945): brother of Barnabás Tost. He served as Hungarian deputy mayor of Kassa, member of the National Assembly. He organized champing for the town's rescue. As a result, some Arrow Cross Party members lured him from his home, and executed him on the town's edge.
- Gyula Tost (1903–1944): son of László Tost. Lieutenant Colonel, served as adjutant of Regent Miklós Horthy. On the day of the Arrow Cross Party's coup he died by suicide, as reported by official sources.

Political offices
Preceded by György Lukács	Minister of Religion and Education; 1906	Succeeded by Albert Apponyi
