= József Domokos =

Hungarian jurist

President of the Supreme Court
- In office 1954–1958
- Preceded by: Erik Molnár
- Succeeded by: Mihály Jahner-Bakos

Chief Prosecutor
- In office 1945 – May 1953
- Preceded by: László Mendelényi (as Crown Prosecutor)
- Succeeded by: Kálmán Czakó

Personal details
- Born: 25 October 1890 Békéscsaba, Austria-Hungary
- Died: 25 January 1978 (aged 87) Budapest, Hungary
- Profession: jurist

Dr. József Domokos (25 October 1890 – 25 January 1978) was a Hungarian jurist, who served as Chief Prosecutor (1945–1953) and President of the Supreme Court of Hungary (1954–1958).

== Biography ==
He studied law at the Budapest University and the Franz Joseph University. He was a junior lawyer in Békéscsaba and Budapest. He protected movement activists. He was a member of the National Council in Békéscsaba and the local branch of the Hungarian Social Democratic Party (MSZDP) since November 1918. During the Hungarian Soviet Republic he was elected to the Worker's Council. He was a delegate in the Congress of the Hungarian Communist Party in June 1919. He emigrated to Vienna in 1920 and participated in the editing of Bécsi Magyar Újság. He returned to home in 1925 and became a lawyer in 1927.

Domokos was one of the founders of the Organization of Social Democratic Jurists in 1927. He became pleader of the United Trade Union Opposition in 1931. He served as lawyer for the prosecuted Communists and Socialists between 1931 and 1944. He was the pleader of the leather workers' union since 1940. After the Nazi occupation of Hungary (March 1944), he was arrested and deported to the Mauthausen concentration camp. He returned to Hungary in May 1945.

He served as Secretary of State for Justice in August 1945. After that he was appointed the first Chief Prosecutor of Hungary. He requested his dismissal and retired in May 1953. He was recalled and became President of the Supreme Court in 1954. He had an important role in building a new justice system, impeachment of the war criminals and rehabilitation of the victims of show trials.

Legal offices
Preceded by László Mendelényi	Chief Prosecutor; 1945–1953	Succeeded by Kálmán Czakó
Preceded by Erik Molnár	President of the Supreme Court; 1954–1958	Succeeded by Mihály Jahner-Bakos
