= István Magyar =

Crown Prosecutor
- In office 1930–1934
- Preceded by: Lajos Halász
- Succeeded by: Endre Gáll

Personal details
- Born: 6 February 1864; Eperjes, Sáros County, Kingdom of Hungary (today: Prešov, Slovakia)
- Died: 8 September 1954 (aged 90); Budapest, People's Republic of Hungary
- Profession: jurist

Dr. István Magyar (6 February 1864 – 8 September 1954) was a Hungarian jurist, who served as Crown Prosecutor of Hungary from 1930 to 1934.

Legal offices
Preceded by Lajos Halász	Crown Prosecutor; 1930–1934	Succeeded by Endre Gáll
