= László Mendelényi =

Crown Prosecutor
- In office 1944–1944
- Preceded by: Zoltán Timkó
- Succeeded by: József Domokos (as Chief Prosecutor)

Personal details
- Born: 7 February 1877 Nyitrazsámbokrét, Austria-Hungary (today: Žabokreky nad Nitrou, Slovakia)
- Died: 1973 Budapest
- Profession: jurist

Dr. László Mendelényi (7 February 1877 – 1973) was a Hungarian jurist, who served as the last Crown Prosecutor of Hungary in 1944.

Legal offices
Preceded by Zoltán Timkó	Crown Prosecutor; 1944	Succeeded by József Domokos
