= Kálmán Györgyi =

Hungarian jurist and academic (1939–2019)

Chief Prosecutor
- In office 26 June 1990 – 16 May 2000
- Preceded by: Károly Szíjártó
- Succeeded by: Péter Polt

Personal details
- Born: 24 May 1939; Budapest, Hungary
- Died: 17 February 2019 (aged 79)
- Profession: Jurist

Kálmán Györgyi (24 May 1939 – 17 February 2019) was a Hungarian jurist and academic, who served as Chief Prosecutor of Hungary from 1990 to 2000.

== Career ==
He graduated from the Eötvös Loránd University in 1964. He studied at the Albert Ludwigs University of Freiburg between 1969 and 1970. After finishing his studies, he became a trainee in the Faculty of Law of the Eötvös Loránd University. He was an adjunct (1965–1969) then associate professor (1979–1990). He served as Deputy Dean of the Faculty of Law between 1979 and 1985. He functioned as Dean from 1989 to 1990. He was a member of the Board of the Hungarian Jurist Association since 1985. He participated in the creation of the Criminal Code between 1974 and 1978.

Györgyi was elected the first Chief Prosecutor after the end of Communism by the National Assembly in 1990. He was re-elected on 4 June 1996. He resigned from his position without giving a reason on 6 March 2000 despite his mandate was to expire in two years. He was replaced by Péter Polt on 15 May 2000. After that Györgyi was appointed Ministerial Commissioner responsible for codification of criminal law, under Minister Ibolya Dávid.

Györgyi died on 17 February 2019, aged 79.

== Awards ==
- László Szalay Medallion (1988)
- Grand Cross with Star and Sash of the Order of Merit of the Federal Republic of Germany (1995)

== Sources ==
- Biography

Legal offices
Preceded by Károly Szíjártó	Chief Prosecutor; 1990–2000	Succeeded by Péter Polt
