= György Nonn =

Hungarian politician (1918–2007)

Chief Prosecutor
- In office 1955 – 16 November 1956
- Preceded by: Kálmán Czakó
- Succeeded by: Géza Szénási

Personal details
- Born: 9 January 1918 Csanálos, Austria-Hungary (now Urziceni, Romania)
- Died: 17 November 2007 (aged 89) Budapest, Hungary
- Party: Hungarian Communist Party; Hungarian Working People's Party
- Profession: jurist

György Nonn (9 January 1918 – 17 November 2007) was a Hungarian jurist, who served as Chief Prosecutor of Hungary from 1955 to 1956.

Legal offices
Preceded by Kálmán Czakó	Chief Prosecutor; 1955–1956	Succeeded by Géza Szénási
