= Sándor Kozma =

Hungarian politician and jurist

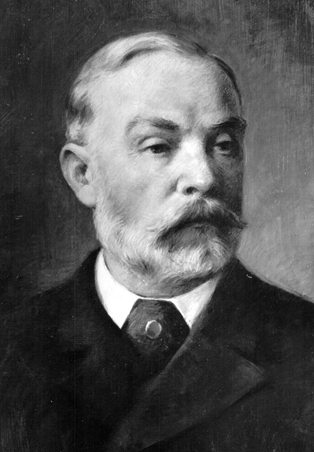

Crown Prosecutor
- In office 1872 – 6 May 1896
- Preceded by: office established
- Succeeded by: Jenő Hammersberg

Personal details
- Born: 2 September 1825 Kőröshegy, Kingdom of Hungary
- Died: 5 August 1897 (aged 71) Budapest, Austria-Hungary
- Spouse: Regina Magdolna Jozefa Dóczy
- Children: Ferenc; Andor; Mária
- Profession: politician, jurist

Dr. Sándor Kozma de Leveld (9 September 1825 – 5 August 1897) was a Hungarian politician and jurist, who served as the first Crown Prosecutor of Hungary from 1872 to 1896.

== Biography ==
Kozma was born into a noble family. His brother was Ferenc, a ministerial counsellor and agronomist. Sándor finished his secondary studies in Sopron, Pécs and Pápa, in the latter as a schoolmate of Sándor Petőfi, Mór Jókai and Károly Kerkapoly. He studied law in Pressburg (Pozsony; today Bratislava, Slovakia). He became a lawyer in 1847.

On 13 March 1848, he announced the achievements of the First Vienna Uprising in Pressburg. In the Diet of 1848, he served as aide for Szegedy, later the radical László Madarász, both of them envoys from Somogy County. He participated in the Hungarian Revolution of 1848, he fought against the Serbs in the southern territories. After the defeat of the Independence War, he was enlisted in the Austrian Imperial Army, but was fired soon. He was interned in the 1850s, he worked as a lawyer in Somogy County under police surveillance.

He was elected Member of Parliament to the Diet of 1861. He was a member of the Address Party led by Ferenc Deák. He was appointed head of department in the Ministry of Justice in 1867, during the ministership of Boldizsár Horvát. He served as judge of the Supreme Court of the Curia Regia since September 1869.

After the establishment of the prosecution system in 1872, he became the first Crown Prosecutor of Budapest but his competence extended to the whole country. He oversaw and supervised the operation of detention facilities, as a result he was called "Father of the Prisons". He edited the Magyar Igazságügy ("Hungarian Justice") between 1880 and 1893.

Kozma retired in 1896. He was awarded Commanders' Cross of the Order of Leopold by Francis Joseph I of Austria. He died on 5 August 1897. His tomb inscription: "Apostle of the justice and humaneness, incarnation of the Hungarian law, father and forever leading figure of the Crown Prosecution" (by Gusztáv Gegus).

Legal offices
Preceded by office established	Crown Prosecutor; 1872–1896	Succeeded by Jenő Hammersberg
