= Kálmán Czakó =

Hungarian jurist

Chief Prosecutor
- In office 4 July 1953 – 4 August 1955
- Preceded by: József Domokos
- Succeeded by: György Nonn

Personal details
- Born: 18 April 1919; Nagykáta, Hungary
- Died: 15 September 1985 (aged 66); Budapest, Hungary
- Political party: MKP, MDP
- Profession: jurist

Dr. Kálmán Czakó (18 April 1919 – 15 September 1985) was a Hungarian jurist, who served as Chief Prosecutor of Hungary from 1953 to 1955. He functioned as Deputy Minister of Justice between 1952 and 1953.

Legal offices
Preceded by József Domokos	Chief Prosecutor; 1953–1955	Succeeded by György Nonn
