= Chief Prosecutor of Hungary =

Government agency of Hungary

Prosecutor General of Hungary
- Incumbent; Péter Fejes since 4 November 2026
- Office of the Prosecutor General
- Residence: Budapest
- Appointer: National Assembly on the nomination of the President
- Term length: 9 years
- Inaugural holder: Sándor Kozma
- Formation: 1872
- Website: Chief Prosecutor's Office

The Prosecutor General (Hungarian: Legfőbb ügyész) is the official charged with prosecuting cases at a national level in Hungary. The Prosecutor General is elected by a qualified majority of the parliament to 9-year terms (formerly 6 years), has a fixed office budget, and has no government oversight. The Office of Prosecutor General has evolved into a separate branch of the government of Hungary since 1989.

== History and function ==
The independent pillar status of the Hungarian public accuser's office is a unique construction, loosely modeled on the system Portugal introduced after the 1974 victory of the Carnation Revolution. The public accuser (attorney general) body has become the fourth column of Hungarian democracy only in recent times: after communism fell in 1989, the office was made independent by a new clausule XI. of the Constitution. The change was meant to prevent abuse of state power, especially with regards to the use of false accusations against opposition politicians, who may be excluded from elections if locked in protracted or excessively severe court cases.

To prevent the Hungarian accuser's office from neglecting its duties, natural human private persons can submit investigation requests, called "pótmagánvád" directly to the courts, if the accusers' office refuses to do its job. Courts will decide if the allegations have merit and order police to act in lieu of the accuser's office if warranted. In its decision No.42/2005 the Hungarian constitutional court declared that the government does not enjoy such privilege and the state is powerless to further pursue cases if the public accuser refuses to do so.

=== List office-holders ===
Crown Prosecutors
No.	Name	Term of Office	
1.	Sándor Kozma	1872	1896
2.	Jenő Hammersberg	1896	1902
3.	Ferenc Székely	1902	1910
4.	Jenő Pongrácz	1910	1923
5.	Ferenc Vargha	1923	1930
6.	Lajos Halász	1930	
7.	István Magyar	1930	1934
8.	Endre Gáll	1934	1935
9.	Ferenc Finkey	1935	1940
10.	Zoltán Timkó	1940	1944
11.	László Mendelényi	1944	
Prosecutors General
No.	Name	Term of Office	
12.	József Domokos	1945	1953
13.	Kálmán Czakó	1953	1955
14.	György Nonn	1955	1956
15.	Géza Szénási	1956	1975
16.	Károly Szíjártó	1975	1990
17.	Kálmán Györgyi	1990	2000
18.	Péter Polt	2000	2006
19.	Tamás Kovács	2006	2010
20.	Péter Polt	2010	2025
21.	Gábor Bálint Nagy	2025	2026
22.	Péter Fejes	2026	

== Structure ==
=== Organizational structure ===
The prosecutor's bodies of the Republic of Hungary

- National level:
  - Office of the General Prosecutor (Army Chief, the Military Appellate Prosecutor's Office, Central Detective Chief)
- regional level:
  - Appellate chief prosecution offices
  - Territorial Military Prosecutor's Office (General Prosecution power to operate them, covering several counties)
- provincial (municipal) level:
  - chief prosecution offices (Public Prosecutor's Investigator)
- local (capital district) level:
  - local (District) Public Prosecutors
  - The National Institute of Criminology for scientific and research body, the Hungarian Ügyészképző Centre and the profession by training in preparation.

=== The Supreme Public Prosecutor ===
The Office of the General Prosecutor is located at the top of the prosecutor's bodies, based in Budapest. Monthly official journal of the Public Prosecutor's Gazette. The attorney general has the direct supervision of:

- Cabinet Office
- Personnel, Development and Administration Department
- International and European Affairs Department
- International Class Self-Representation
- Department of Legal Self-Representation
- Economic Directorate
- Self-Control Unit

The criminal deputy attorney general has the direct supervision of:

- Detection and Surveillance Department Vádelőkészítési
- Special Affairs Department
- Criminal Affairs Department
- Prison Legal expenses of legal supervision and the Department of Self
- Department of Children and Youth Self-

The Deputy Prosecutor General for civil law and administrative law has the direct supervision of:

- Administrative Law Division
- Department of Private Law
- Computer and Information Division, Employment
- The military is under the direct supervision of Attorney General:
- Department of Military Affairs
- Independent Human Resource and Information Department
- Independent Financial and Accounting Department
