= Jenő Pongrácz =

Crown Prosecutor
- In office 1910–1923
- Preceded by: Ferenc Székely
- Succeeded by: Ferenc Vargha

Personal details
- Born: 27 November 1852; Palást, Kingdom of Hungary (today: Plášťovce, Slovakia)
- Died: 9 August 1933 (aged 80)
- Profession: jurist

Dr. Jenő Pongrácz (27 November 1852 – 9 August 1933) was a Hungarian jurist, who served as Crown Prosecutor of Hungary from 1910 to 1923.

Legal offices
Preceded by Ferenc Székely	Crown Prosecutor; 1910–1923	Succeeded by Ferenc Vargha
