= György Lukács (politician) =

Hungarian politician

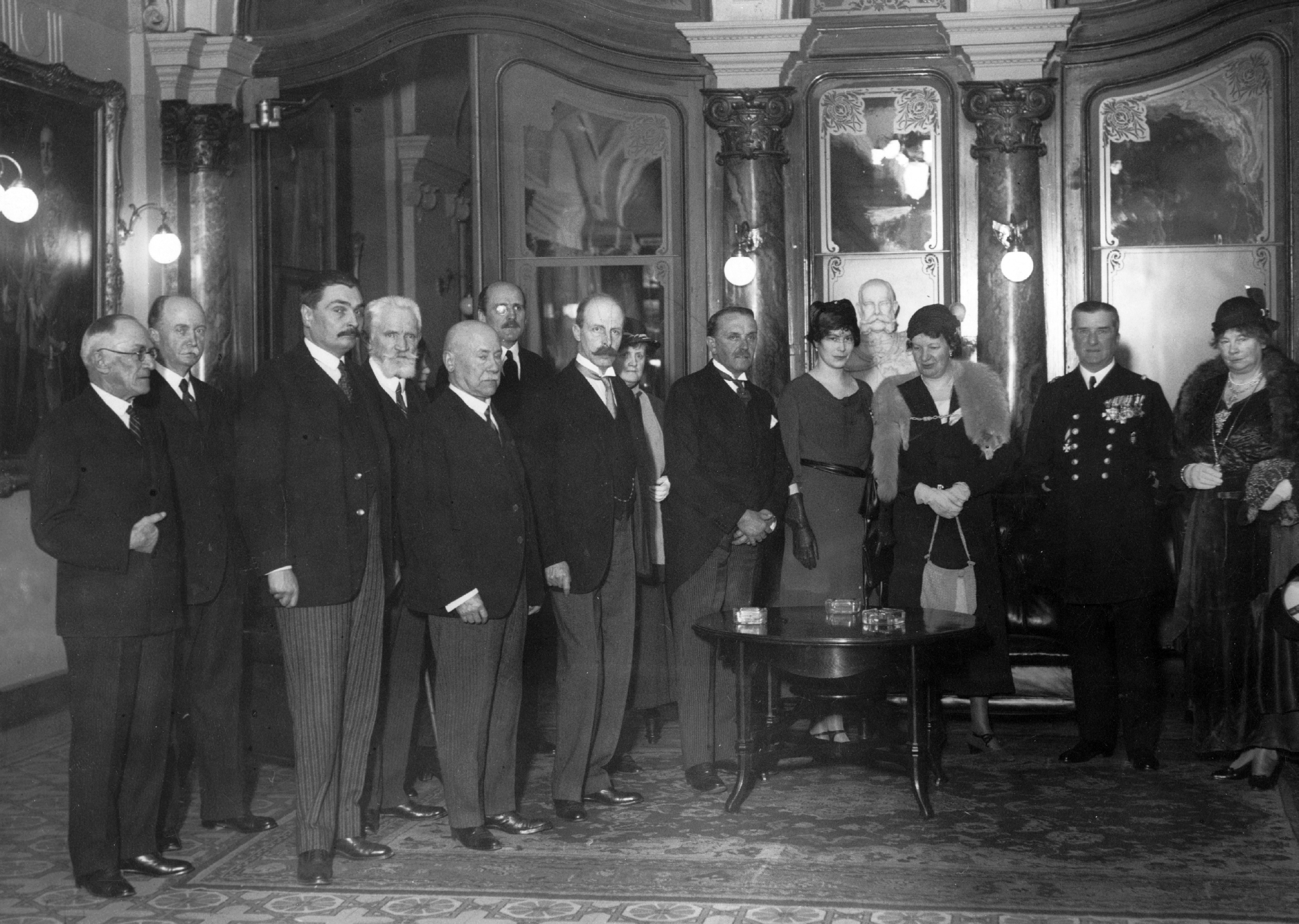
- György Lukács

Minister of Religion and Education of Hungary
- In office 18 June 1905 – 6 March 1906
- Prime Minister: Géza Fejérváry
- Preceded by: Albert Berzeviczy
- Succeeded by: Gyula Tost

Personal details
- Born: 10 September 1865 Nagyvárad, Kingdom of Hungary, Austrian Empire
- Died: 28 September 1950 (aged 85) Budapest, Hungary
- Party: Liberal Party, Constitution Party, Unity Party
- Profession: politician, jurist

György Lukács de Erzsébetváros (10 September 1865 – 28 September 1950) was a Hungarian politician, who served as Minister of Religion and Education between 1905 and 1906. From 1887 to 1897 he worked for the Ministry of Interior, where he suggested nationalising the parish register. He also had a significant role in crushing the peasant movements. He was a member of the Diet of Hungary from 1921. During the Regency he was active in the Interparliamentary Union and the League of Nations Union. He served as president of the Hungarian National Fine Art Association and managing chairman of the chauvinist Hungarian Revisionist League party.

Political offices
Preceded by Albert Berzeviczy	Minister of Religion and Education; 1905–1906	Succeeded by Gyula Tost
