= Jenő Balogh =

Hungarian politician and jurist

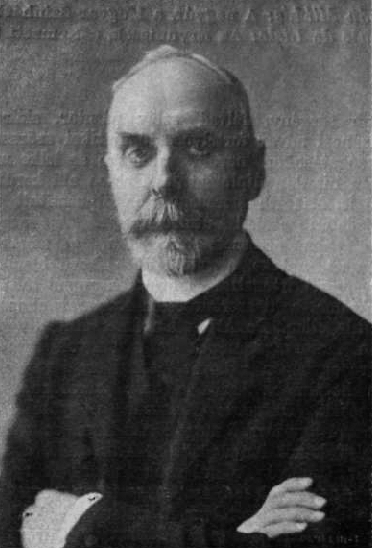

Minister of Justice of Hungary
- In office 4 January 1913 – 15 June 1917
- Prime Minister: László Lukács; István Tisza
- Preceded by: Ferenc Székely
- Succeeded by: Vilmos Vázsonyi

Personal details
- Born: May 14, 1864 Devecser, Kingdom of Hungary
- Died: 15 February 1953 (aged 88) Budapest, People's Republic of Hungary
- Party: Party of National Work
- Profession: politician, jurist

Jenő Balogh (14 May 1864 - 15 February 1953) was a Hungarian politician and jurist, who served as Minister of Justice between 1913 and 1917. After the fall of the second István Tisza cabinet (1917) he retired from politics. He also served as General Secretary of the Hungarian Academy of Sciences from 1920 to 1935.

Political offices
Preceded by Ferenc Székely	Minister of Justice; 1913–1917	Succeeded by Vilmos Vázsonyi
