= Lajos Halász =

Hungarian jurist

Dr. Lajos Halász de Dabas (born around 1861, died 2 September 1940 in Kőbánya, Budapest) was a Hungarian jurist, who served as Crown Prosecutor of Hungary in 1930.

Legal offices
Preceded by Ferenc Vargha	Crown Prosecutor; 1930	Succeeded by István Magyar
