= Jenő Hammersberg =

Hungarian politician, lawyer (1845-1918)

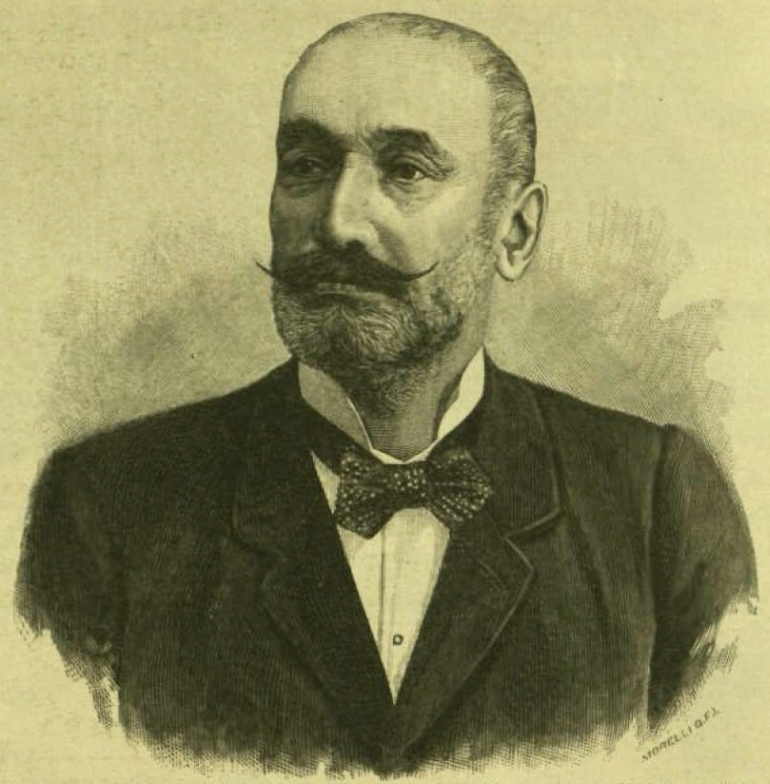

Crown Prosecutor
- In office 6 May 1896 – 28 June 1902
- Preceded by: Sándor Kozma
- Succeeded by: Ferenc Székely

Personal details
- Born: 14 March 1845 Kassa, Kingdom of Hungary (today: Košice, Slovakia)
- Died: 20 February 1918 (aged 72) Budapest, Austria-Hungary
- Profession: politician, jurist

Dr. Jenő Hammersberg (14 March 1845 – 20 February 1918) was a Hungarian politician and lawyer, who served as Crown Prosecutor of Hungary from 1896 to 1902. Formerly he was a Member of Parliament between 1872 and 1878. He retired in 1902.

Legal offices
Preceded by Sándor Kozma	Crown Prosecutor; 1896–1902	Succeeded by Ferenc Székely
