= Géza Szénási =

Hungarian jurist (1919–1979)

Chief Prosecutor
- In office 16 November 1956 – December 1975
- Preceded by: György Nonn
- Succeeded by: Károly Szíjártó

Personal details
- Born: 23 November 1919; Budapest, Hungary
- Died: 21 February 1979 (aged 59); Budapest, Hungary
- Political party: MKP, MDP, MSZMP
- Profession: jurist

Dr. Géza Szénási (23 November 1919 – 21 February 1979) was a Hungarian jurist, who served as Chief Prosecutor of Hungary from 1956 to 1975.

== Early life ==
He graduated from the Budapest University in 1941. He joined the Hungarian Communist Party (MKP) in 1945. He was a member of the Central Committee of the Hungarian Socialist Workers' Party (MSZMP) between 1962 and 1975. He served as Hungarian Ambassador to Bulgaria from December 1975 until his death.

Legal offices
Preceded by György Nonn	Chief Prosecutor; 1956–1975	Succeeded by Károly Szíjártó
