= Ferenc Székely =

Hungarian politician

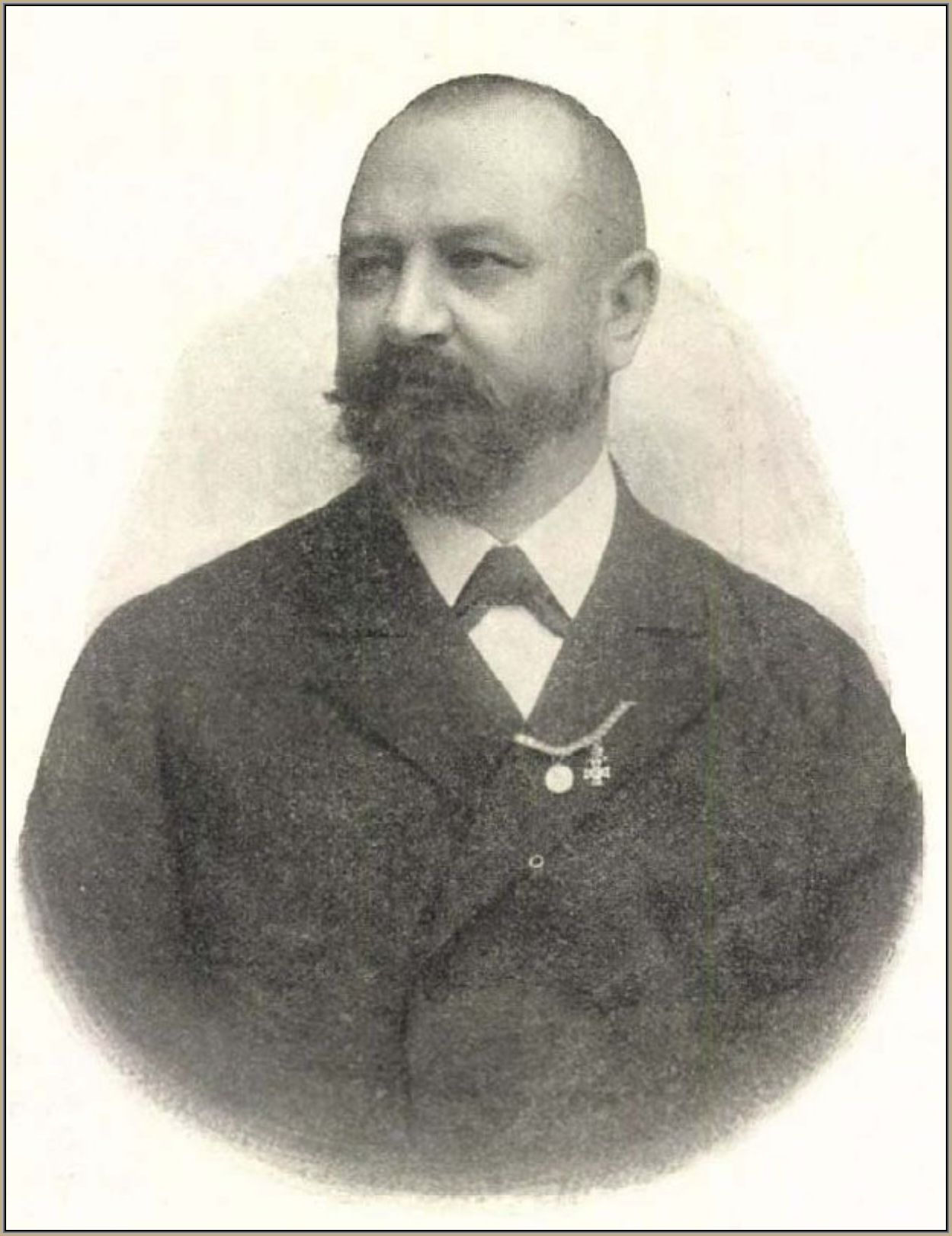

Minister of Justice of Hungary
- In office 17 January 1910 – 4 January 1913
- Prime Minister: Károly Khuen-Héderváry; László Lukács
- Preceded by: Sándor Wekerle
- Succeeded by: Jenő Balogh

Personal details
- Born: 11 March 1842 Szombathely, Kingdom of Hungary, Austrian Empire
- Died: 17 March 1921 (aged 79) Budapest, Kingdom of Hungary
- Party: Party of National Work
- Profession: politician, jurist

Ferenc Székely (11 March 1842 – 17 March 1921) was a Hungarian politician, who served as Minister of Justice between 1910 and 1917. He also served as interim Minister of Religion and Education in 1910. From 1871 he was Deputy Chief Prosecutor in Debrecen.

Legal offices
Preceded by Jenő Hammersberg	Crown Prosecutor; 1902–1910	Succeeded by Jenő Pongrácz
Political offices
Preceded by Sándor Wekerle	Minister of Justice; 1910–1913	Succeeded by Jenő Balogh
Preceded by Albert Apponyi	Minister of Religion and Education; Acting; 1910	Succeeded by János Zichy
