= Ferenc Finkey =

Hungarian jurist

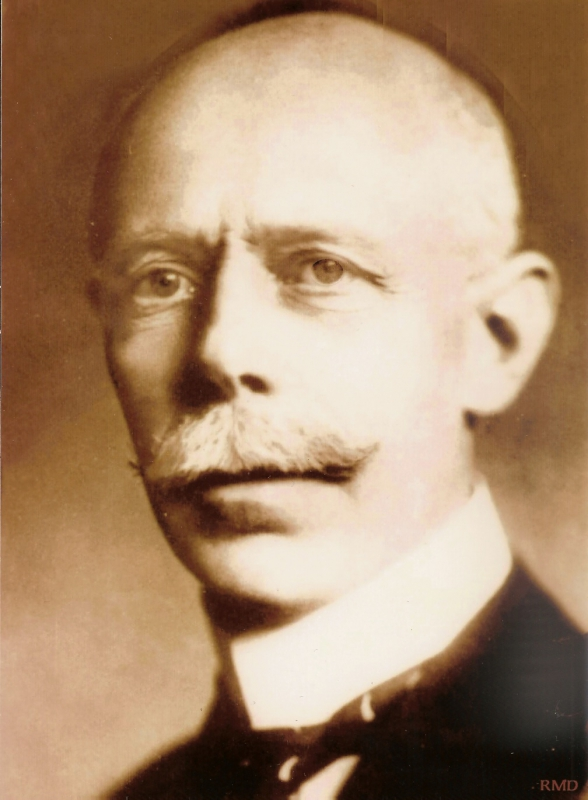
- Finkey in 1918

Crown Prosecutor
- In office 1935–1940
- Monarchs: Miklós Horthy as Regent
- Preceded by: Endre Gáll
- Succeeded by: Zoltán Timkó

Personal details
- Born: 30 January 1870; Sárospatak, Zemplén County, Austria-Hungary
- Died: 23 January 1949 (aged 78); Sárospatak, Hungary
- Profession: jurist

Dr. Ferenc Finkey (30 January 1870 – 23 January 1949) was a Hungarian jurist, who served as Crown Prosecutor of Hungary from 1935 to 1940.

He became an ordinary member of the Hungarian Academy of Sciences in 1929. He was elected to the House of Magnates in 1939. His work is lasting value in the area of substantive criminal law and criminal procedural law.

== Publications ==
- Az egység és többség tana a büntetőjogban (Sárospatak, 1895)
- A magyar büntetőeljárás tankönyve (Budapest, 1899)
- A börtönügy jelen állapota és reformkérdései (Budapest, 1904)
- A tételes jog alapelvei és vezéreszméi (Budapest, 1908)
- A magyar büntető perjog tankönyve (Budapest, 1916)
- A magyar anyagi büntetőjog jelen állapota (Budapest, 1923)
- Büntetéstani problémák (Budapest, 1933)

Legal offices
Preceded by Endre Gáll	Crown Prosecutor; 1935–1940	Succeeded by Zoltán Timkó
