= Endre Gáll =

Hungarian jurist

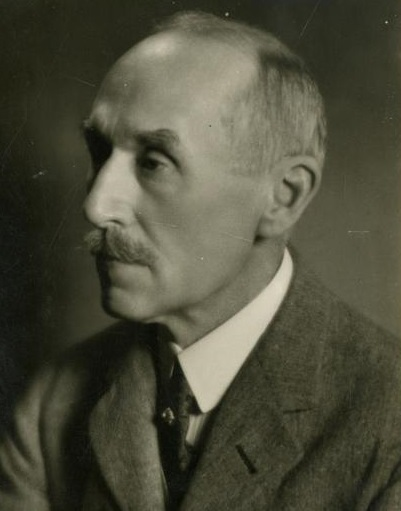
- Endre Gáll in 1934

Crown Prosecutor
- In office 1 October 1934 – 14 June 1935
- Preceded by: István Magyar
- Succeeded by: Ferenc Finkey

Personal details
- Born: 16 July 1868 Nagykőrös, Austria-Hungary
- Died: 10 December 1935 (aged 67) Budapest, Hungary
- Profession: jurist

Dr. Endre Gáll (16 July 1868 – 10 December 1935) was a Hungarian jurist, who served as Crown Prosecutor of Hungary between 1 October 1934 and 14 June 1935.

== Biography ==
Endre Gáll was born in Nagykőrös on 16 July 1868 into a Calvinist famil, the son of vice-notary and archivist Endre Gáll Sr. and Judit Ács. His father later became the first President of the Royal Court of Kecskemét. Endre Jr. finished his secondary studies at Piarist gymnasiums of Wiener Neustadt and Kecskemét. He earned his law degree at University of Budapest and Heidelberg University. He became prosecutor in 1898 and relocated to Budapest. He passed the bar exam in 1904. He was appointed to the Crown Prosecution of Pest County in 1905.

Gáll was prosecutor in the trial of the Dános murders from 1907 to 1908. Later he called this role the "greatest criminal investigation" in his life. In 1915 he was appointed President of the Crown Prosecution of Pest County in 1915. On 1 October 1934, he was appointed Crown Prosecutor by Minister of Justice Andor Lázár, thus also became a member of the House of Magnates. He soon fell ill and retired on 14 June 1935. He died on 10 December 1935.

Legal offices
Preceded by István Magyar	Crown Prosecutor; 1934–1935	Succeeded by Ferenc Finkey
