= Zoltán Timkó =

Crown Prosecutor
- In office 1940–1944
- Preceded by: Ferenc Finkey
- Succeeded by: László Mendelényi

Personal details
- Born: 11 June 1874 Kassa, Austria-Hungary (today: Košice, Slovakia)
- Died: 11 April 1946 (aged 71)
- Profession: jurist

Dr. Zoltán Timkó (11 June 1874 – 11 April 1946) was a Hungarian jurist, who served as Crown Prosecutor of Hungary from 1940 to 1944.

Legal offices
Preceded by Ferenc Finkey	Crown Prosecutor; 1940–1944	Succeeded by László Mendelényi
