= Ferenc Vargha =

Hungarian jurist (1858–1940)

Crown Prosecutor
- In office 1923–1930
- Preceded by: Jenő Pongrácz
- Succeeded by: Lajos Halász

Personal details
- Born: 26 November 1858; Kecskemét, Kingdom of Hungary
- Died: 30 September 1940 (aged 81); Budapest, Kingdom of Hungary
- Profession: jurist

Dr. Ferenc Vargha (26 November 1858 – 30 September 1940) was a Hungarian jurist, who served as Crown Prosecutor of Hungary from 1923 to 1930.

Legal offices
| Preceded by Jenő Pongrácz | Crown Prosecutor; 1923–1930 | Succeeded by Lajos Halász |
