= Soponya =

- Large village
- Coat of arms

- Location of Fejér county in Hungary

- Location of Soponya
- Coordinates: 47.01317°N 18.45547°E
- Country: Hungary
- County: Fejér
- District: Székesfehérvár

Area
  - Total: 49.96 km^{2} (19.29 sq mi)

Population (2004)
  - Total: 2,077
  - Density: 41.57/km^{2} (107.7/sq mi)
- Time zone: UTC+1 (CET)
  - Summer (DST): UTC+2 (CEST)
- Postal code: 8123
- Area code: (+36) 22

Soponya is a large village in Fejér county, Hungary.

== Gallery ==
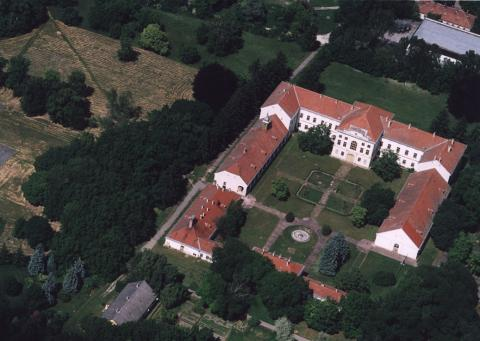
Soponya, palace from a bird's eye view

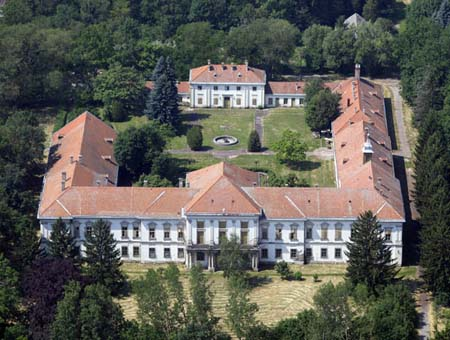

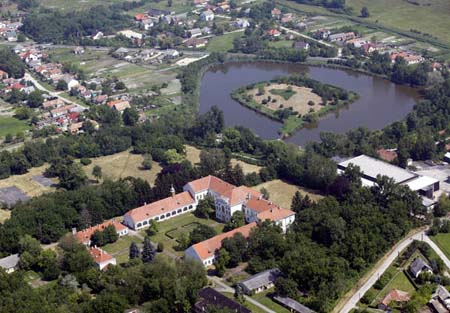
