= Tésa =

- Location of Tésa in Hungary
- Coordinates: 48°1′51.31″N 18°50′37.18″E
- Country: Hungary
- Region: Central Hungary
- County: Pest
- Subregion: Szobi
- Rank: Village

Area
  - Total: 4.38 km^{2} (1.69 sq mi)

Population (1 January 2015)
  - Total: 82
  - Density: 19/km^{2} (48/sq mi)
- Time zone: UTC+1 (CET)
  - Summer (DST): UTC+2 (CEST)
- Postal code: 2635
- Area code: +36 27
- KSH code: 19248
- Website: http://tesa.fw.hu/

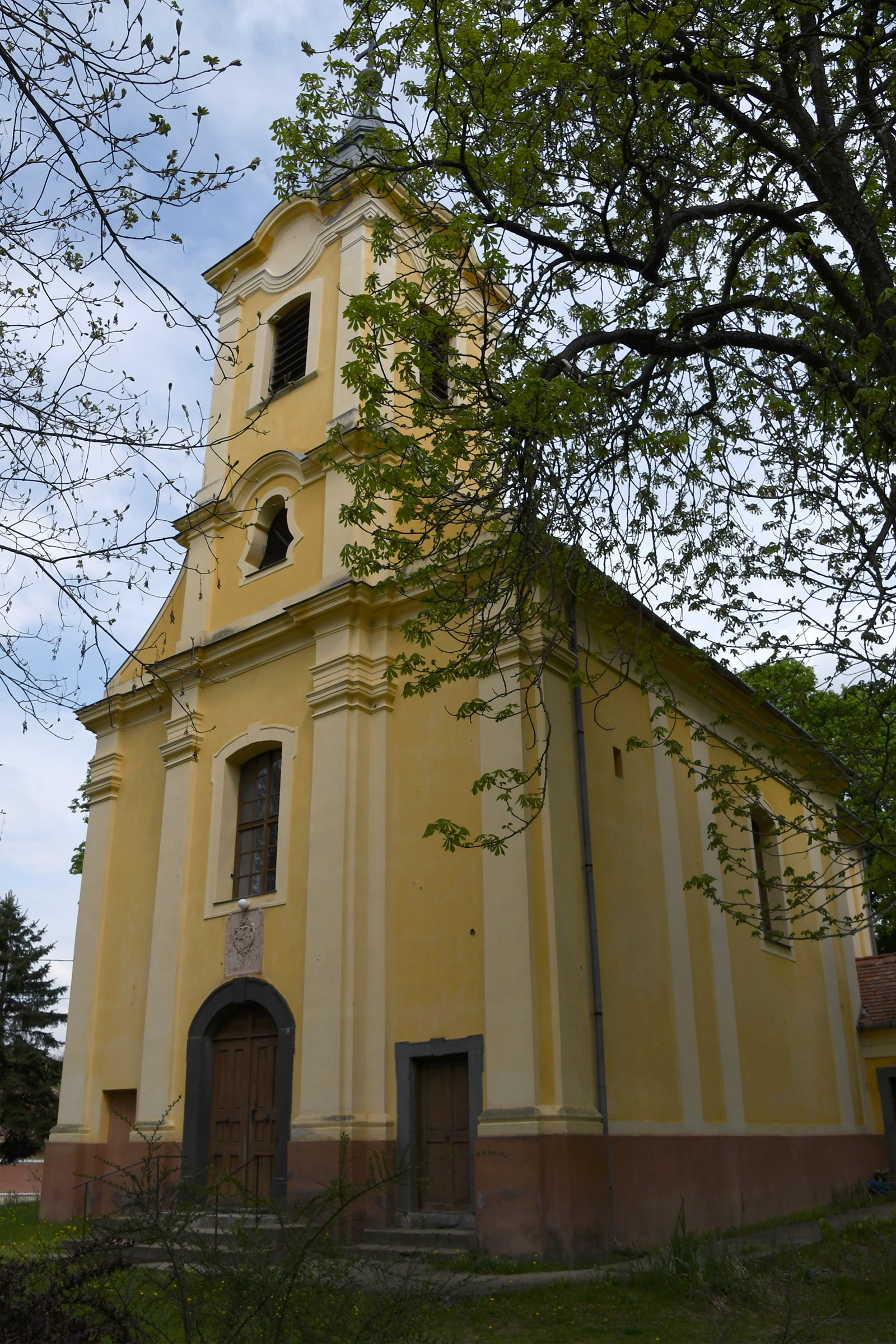
Photograph of a Roman Catholic church in Tésa, Hungary

Tésa is a village in Pest county, Hungary.
