= Sirena Borkanyuk =

Szerena Akerman in 1928

Sirena Borkanyuk (1914-1971), née Szerena Akerman, also known as Serena, Sara or Tsika, was a communist activist from Subcarpathian Rus'/Transcarpathian Ukraine. After returning from exile in the Soviet Union during World War II, she was a member without portfolio of the governing People's Council of Transcarpathian Ukraine. She held various key government and party posts in Transcarpathia from 1944 and 1950.

== Youth ==
Szerena Akerman was born in Mukachevo on February 23, 1914, into a religious Jewish family. Her Jewish name was Surah. Her father Ignatz Akerman was a wine merchant. Growing up, she was the fourth among eight siblings. Her nick-name was Tsyka.

She became active in communist mass organization politics from 1932 onward, becoming a member of the Young Communist League of Czechoslovakia. She graduated from the Mukachevo Trade Academy 1933-1934. After graduation Szerena began working at an insurance company. She joined the Communist Party of Czechoslovakia in 1936. Szerena began working with the communist newspaper Karpatska Pravda, which was published by the parliamentarian Oleksa Borkanyuk. Szerena and Oleksa fell in love, and they got married and the couple rented an apartment in Mukachevo in 1936.

Szerena and Oleksa's marriage caused a major controversy in the Jewish community in Mukachevo. Her parents were vehemently opposed the relationship, as Oleksa was not Jewish. Szerena's mother observed a week-long shiva mourning ritual, declaring her daughter dead. Oleksa and Serena moved to Uzhhorod, as the situation of pressure and rumours in Mukachevo became unbearable. Szerena's father was reportedly killed in the Mukachevo synagogue in 1937, due to his daughter's marriage to a non-Jewish man.

Szerena was an active cadre for the Subcarpathian Regional Committee of the Communist Party of Czechoslovakia, worked as secretary-typist and translator for the committee. She assisted the Subcarpathian Regional Committee with the distribution of underground correspondence and worked with the underground publishing house of the Regional Committee. She was active in organizations such as the Friends of the Soviet Union and the Federation of Proletarian Physical Culture (she served as the regional secretary for Subcarpathian Rus' of the organization, and in 1937 she became a Central Committee member). Her daughter Olga was born 1939.

== Exile ==
On March 16, 1939, as Hungarian forces occupied Transcarpathia, Oleksa fled to the Soviet Union. In May 1939 Szerena took her daughter and migrated to the Soviet Union - joining her husband there. She had various jobs in the Soviet Union - teaching Ukrainian language in Moscow, working at an enterprise in Stalingrad, working in the Interhelpo commune near Frunze and teaching at an orphanage in Frunze. Her husband returned to Transcarpathia in secret, where he organized partisan movement there. Oleksa Borkanyuk was captured by the German forces, handed over to the Hungarian authorities, and was executed in Budapest.

In late 1942 she was called to Moscow, and directed to work in the Hungarian section at the Communist International. She worked for Research Institute No. 205 1943-1944. She worked in the editorial offices of Radio L. Kossuth and, later, Golos Zakarpattia, as editor and announcer. She was also a member of the editorial board of Československé listy. She worked with the All-Slavic Anti-Fascist Committee.

== Return to Transcarpathia ==
In late 1944 she was instructed by Klement Gottwald to go to Transcarpathia. She left Moscow on November 14, 1944, as part of a Foreign Bureau of the Communist Party of Czechoslovakia fact-finding mission led by Josef Krosnář, arriving in Uzhhorod on November 21, 1944. During the journey, she was elected as a Central Committee of the Communist Party of Transcarpathian Ukraine on November 19, 1944 in absentia. She headed the cadre department of the party. She was a delegate to the November 26, 1944 First Congress of People's Committees of Trancarpathian Ukraine and elected to the People's Council of Transcarpathian Ukraine (the provisional government of the area) without portfolio. After her return to Transcarpatian Ukraine, she worked as editor of Munkás Újság. In January 1945, she was elected to head the Audit Commission of the Trade Union Council of Transcarpathian Ukraine. She remarried in 1945, marrying party cadre Mykhailo Lyalko. Her son Yuri was born in 1948. The couple later underwent divorce.

After the merger of Transcarpathian Ukraine with Soviet Ukraine, she the Women's Department of the Transcarpathian Regional Party Committee of the Communist Party (Bolsheviks) of Ukraine. She was elected to the Transcarpathian Region and Mukachevo City soviets. In 1946 she was awarded the medal "For Valiant Labour in the Great Patriotic War 1941–1945". In 1948 she graduated from cadre course at the party school of the Central Committee of the Communist Party (Bolsheviks) of Ukraine. She was awarded the Order of the Badge of Honour in 1948.

== Later years ==
In 1950 she requested to be relieved from her post as the head of the Transcarpathia Regional Party Committee Women's Department, due to family circumstances. After retiring from party work she worked as the head of the personnel department of a garment factory in Mukachevo. She died on July 5, 1971 in Uzhhorod, in a domestic accident.
