= Communist Party of Transcarpathian Ukraine =

Communist Party of Transcarpathian Ukraine Комуністична партія Закарпатської України
- First Secretary: Ivan Turyanitsa
- Governing body: Central Committee
- Founded: November 19, 1944
- Newspaper: Zakarpatska Pravda
- Membership (1945): 4,279
- Ideology: Marxism–Leninism

The Communist Party of Transcarpathian Ukraine (Ukrainian: Комуністична партія Закарпатської України, abbreviated KPZU) was a political party in Transcarpathia 1944–1945, set up in the area after the Soviet Red Army took over the territory. Previously Transcarpathian communists were organized in the Communist Party of Czechoslovakia, but the KPZU had no linkage with that party. The KPZU dominated the provisional government of the territory. In December 1945 the KPZU merged into the Communist Party (Bolsheviks) of Ukraine.

== Background ==
The region known as Transcarpathia, Carpathian Ruthenia or Subcarpathian Rus', which became part of Czechoslovakia after World War I, was one of the main strongholds of the Communist Party of Czechoslovakia. In the 1924 elections of deputies from Subcarpathian Rus' to the Czechoslovak parliament, the Communist Party won over 100,000 votes (nearly 40% of the votes cast). The communist movement operated underground during the Hungarian occupation of the region, and partisan units assisted the arrival of the Red Army. In 1942 the partisan leader and First Secretary of the Subcarpathian Regional Committee of the Communist Party of Czechoslovakia, Oleksa Borkanyuk, was hanged by the Hungarian authorities.

With the defeat of the Hungarian forces in Carpathian Ruthenia/Transcarpathia, communist organizations that had operated in the underground started emerging into the open. The first legal public meeting of communists in Mukachevo was held on October 31, 1944, four days after Liberation. The first public call for unification of Transcarpathia with Soviet Ukraine was made at a meeting at the Mukachevo city theater on November 3, 1944.

== Founding congress ==
The First Conference of Communist Organizations of Transcarpathia was held in Mukachevo on November 19, 1944. The gathering would become the founding congress of the Communist Party of Transcarpathian Ukraine as an independent party. It was held in the city theater. Ivan Turyanitsa, chairman of the organizing committee, opened the meeting. In his speech Turyanitsa made no references to the Communist Party of Czechoslovakia whatsoever. All elections at the conference were done by acclamation. The conference elected Joseph Stalin, Mikhail Kalinin, Vyacheslav Molotov, Nikita Khrushchev, Lazar Kaganovich, Georgy Zhukov and Kliment Voroshilov as members of the honorary presidium of the conference.

The conference had 418 participants – 294 delegates and 124 guests. The 294 delegates represented some 3,500 party members. Around half of the delegates came from the peasantry, 35% were workers and 15% from the working intelligentsia.

The two main agenda points of the conference was reunification with Soviet Ukraine and party program. Ivan Kercha delivered the report on reunification with Soviet Ukraine. According to the conference protocol, his speech received a stormy ovation from the attendees. After Kercha's speech Vasil Rusin read out a draft resolution on the topic. The resolution On the reunification of Transcarpathian Ukraine with Soviet Ukraine was adopted unanimously by the conference delegates. The resolution argued that Transcarpathian Ukrainians had been placed under the rule of the Czechoslovak Republic against their will, later to handed over to 'Hungarian slavery'. Per the resolution it was the wish of the Transcarpathian Ukrainians to reunite "with their elder brother - the people of Soviet Union". Furthermore the resolution that that "[f]rom now on, we are not a small people in need of protection. We are an integral part of the great Ukrainian people."

The other main resolution adopted at the conference was titled "On the immediate tasks of the Communist Party of Transcarpathian Ukraine". The resolution stated that main objective of the party was "the organization of the popular forces for the final defeat of Hitler Germany, the destruction of fascist tyranny and the resolution of national, cultural and social issues through unification with Soviet Ukraine". The resolution stressed that one of the main tasks of the party is the fight for redistribution of lands to landless peasants by expropriating lands belonging to the nobility and the multinational company Latorica. The resolution called for the implementation of eight-hour workday, re-establishing trade unions, expropriation of factories, reconstruction of forest and wood industry enterprises, establishing schools with education in native language, opening a State University of Transcarpathian Ukraine and rebuilding cities and towns. It called for the creation of youth and peasants organizations. The resolution ended with a call to convene a congress of people's committees on November 26, 1944 and to elect a people's council.

The conference sent congratulatory telegrams to Stalin and Khrushchev. The message to Stalin expressed gratitude for the liberation of Transcarpathia, but also touched upon the issue of unification with Soviet Ukraine, reading "Only you, Joseph Vissarionovich, only the Ukrainian and Russian peoples can understand our feelings and our aspirations [...] Return us to the bosom of our motherland — the Ukrainian state. Our people will be eternally grateful to you for this assistance." The desire of the party to promote unification with Ukraine was also the key theme of the telegram to Khruschev, which referred to the recipient as 'the leader of the Ukrainian people, the leader of the Ukrainian Bolsheviks'.

== Central Committee ==
The KPZU founding conference elected a 24-member Central Committee. The party leadership included both returnees from the Soviet Union and local communist organizers. The Central Committee included a number of functionaries of the Subcarpathian Regional Committee of the Communist Party of Czechoslovakia who were returning from the Soviet Union, like Samuel Weiss, S. Borkanyuk, M. Klimpotyuk, P. Varha and D. Tarakhonych. The Central Committee also included a number of staff from the Czechoslovak Army Corps; I. Vash, I. Ledney and M. Matskaniuk - all from the group of Bedřich Reicin. A list of the Central Committee members was published in Zakarpatska Pravda on November 21, 1944;

- Turyanytsia, Ivan Ivanovych (1901–1955) – Born in Mukachevo. Joined the Hungarian Red Army in 1919. Took part in the proclamation of the Slovak Soviet Republic in Prešov on June 16, 1919. The defeat of the Hungarian and Slovak soviet republics, he returned to Mukachevo and would lead the organization of the Communist Party of Czechoslovakia there, and later leading the party organization in Uzhhorod. Studied at the Ukrainian Communist Institute for Journalism in Kharkiv 1930–1933. Arrested in connection with the December 1935 forest workers strike, but released after popular protest movement. Escaped to the Soviet Union after the Hungarian occupation. In the Soviet Union he worked at MOPR, and later at the Voroshilovgrad Locomotive Works. Volunteered to join the Czechoslovak Battalion in 1942. In October 1944 he arrived in Khust along with minister František Němec and general Antonín Hasal, but on November 4, 1944 defected from the Czechoslovak armed forces and would dedicate himself for the cause of unification with Soviet Ukraine.
- Weiss, Samuel Leopoldovich (1899–1971) –Born in Dunaszerdahely, in a Jewish working class family. Studied at the Veszprém Trade School between 1914 and 1917. In 1919 he joined the Hungarian Red Army, in August 1919 he joined the left wing of the Czechoslovak Social Democratic Workers Party. Weiss became a member of the Communist Party of Czechoslovakia in 1921. He worked at a brewery in Nové Zámky, but was fired for political reasons. Migrated to the Soviet Union in 1928, to join the Interhelpo commune. He returned to Czechoslovakia in 1930, and he would lead party organization in Košice, Nové Zamky, Žilina and České Budějovice. He was frequently arrested for his political activities. Between 1934 and 1935 Weiss studied at the International Lenin School in Moscow. After returning again to Czechoslovakia, he served as secretary of the Red Trade Unions in Nitra. In 1937 he was sent to Subcarpathian Rus' to conduct political work among the Hungarian-speaking population there. He led several strike actions in Subcarpathian Rus'. He was a member of the Subcarpathian Ruthenian Regional Committee of the Communist Party of Czechoslovakia. Escaped to the Soviet Union after the Hungarian occupation, and would work in Luhansk and Alma-Ata, as well as working at the Czech and Hungarian language editorial offices of Radio Moscow. In May 1944 began working at the political department of the 4th Ukrainian Front. Soon after the Liberation of Transcarpathian Ukraine, he took charge as first secretary of the Uzhhorod City Party Committee. Delegate of Uzhhorod at the First Congress of People's Committees of Transcarpathian Ukraine. Elected to the People's Council of Transcarpathian Ukraine (in charge Industry and Trade). After the merger into the Soviet Union, he served as deputy chairman of the regional executive committee. Awarded the Order of the Red Star.
- Vash, Ivan Mikhailovich (1904–1966) –Born in Loza into a poor peasant family, became a labourer at age 12. Attending Kharkiv Party School 1931-1933. Labour organizer in Subcarpathian Rus' and took part in many workers agitations, leader of the 1935 Bohdan loggers strike. In 1939 he escaped to the Soviet Union, where he was arrested and placed in labour camp. He joined the Czechoslovak Army Corps. Delegate at the First Congress of People's Committees of Transcarpathian Ukraine, and was elected member of the People's Council of Transcarpathian Ukraine (in charge of internal affairs and state security). After the merger into the Soviet Union, he served as the secretary of the Regional Executive Committee and first secretary of the regional party committee. Elected to the Supreme Soviet of the USSR four times. Brother of Karel Vaš.
- Ledney, Ivan Dmitrievich (1904–1969) – Born in Repynne village in a poor peasant family. Could not finish his secondary school studies due to economic hardship, and would work at a lumber mill. Joined the Communist Party of Czechoslovakia in 1926. Studied at the party school in Kiev 1930-1932, and then at the Ukrainian Communist Institute for Journalism in Kharkiv 1932-1935. Returning to Subcarpathian Rus' he was a cadre of the Subcarpathian Ruthenian Regional Committee of the Communist Party of Czechoslovakia, and held posts of secretary of the Uzhhorod and (later) Tiachiv Party District Committees. Escaped to the Soviet Union after the Hungarian invasion in 1939. Worked at the MOPR Central Committee in Moscow. In 1943 he joined the Czechoslovak Army Corps as a platoon commander, and took part in combat against German forces in Kiev and other Ukrainian cities. In 1944 he served as the chairman of the Mukachevo District People's Committee, and was a delegate in the First Congress of People's Committees of Transcarpathian Ukraine. In April 1946 he was elected as the first secretary of the Mukachevo City Party Committee. Awarded Badge of Honour.
- Fushchych, Vasyl (1900–1970) – Joined the Communist Party of Czechoslovakia in 1924. In October 1926 he shifted to Kharkiv for one year of studies at party school there. As of 1932 he was secretary of the Irshava and Khust District committees of the party. Between 1932 and 1936 he worked as a cadre of Subcarpathian Ruthenian Regional Committee of the party. He became a member of the Czechoslovak National Assembly on June 4, 1936, replacing the deceased parliamentarian Pál Török.
- Matskaniuk, Mykhailo (1909–1967) – Born in a peasant family in Boronyava village. Attended Party School in Kiev 1929-1932, joined the Communist Party of Czechoslovakia. Cadre of the Subcarpathian Ruthenian Regional Committee of the party, and secretary of the Regional Committee of the Young Communist League of Czechoslovakia. Escaped to the Soviet Union in 1939 without permission from the party, for which he was reprimanded. Worked at the Rostselmash factory in Rostov-on-Don. During the war he served as a platoon leader in the Czechoslovak Army Corps. Member of the Central Committee of the Youth League of Transcarpathian Ukraine.
- Varha, Petro – From Rakoshyno. Also known as R. Shalek. Joined the Communist Party of Czechoslovakia in 1921. Elected to the Central Committee of the Communist Party of Czechoslovakia at the seventh party congress.
- Tarakhonych, Dmytro Mykhailovych (1915–1979) – Born in Repynne village, into a peasant family. Went to study at the Mukachevo Trade Academy, but was expelled before graduation due to political activism. Arrested during the Hungarian occupation for distribution of communist propaganda, but released on parole after six months due to lack of evidence. Joined the Communist Party of Czechoslovakia in 1935. In the first half of 1940 he escaped to the Soviet Union. Fought in the Czechoslovak Army Corps, took part in combat against German forces. After Liberation, he was the leader of the Volove People's Committee. Elected to the People's Council of Transcarpathian Ukraine, in charge of agriculture. Second Secretary of the Central Committee of KPZU. Secretary of the Youth League of Transcarpathian Ukraine. He later held posts such as Deputy Chairman of the Transcarpathian Regional Party Committee, Regional Party Committee secretary for agriculture, first secretary of Uzhhorod District Party Committee and head of labour resources department of the Oblast Executive Committee.
- Borkanyuk, Serena (1914–1971) – Born in Mukachevo, widow of communist leader Oleksa Borkanyuk. Joined the Communist Party of Czechoslovakia in 1936. Based in the Soviet Union during the war. Delegate to the First Congress of People's Committees of Trancarpathian Ukraine and elected to the People's Council of Transcarpathian Ukraine. Worked as editor of Munkás Újság. Headed the cadre department of KPZU. Later she would head the Women's Department of the Regional Party Committee of the Communist Party of Ukraine.
- Klympotyuk, Mykola Vasylovych (1906–1971) – Born in Velykyi Bychkiv, Klympotyuk endured hardship during his childhood. His father died in World War I, after which Klympotyuk lived in a homeless shelter for six years. He attended a Romanian school for three years. He returned to Velykyi Bychkiv and worked as a tax collector. He became involved in the youth movement there, but got expelled from the city school after an article in Zakarpatska Pravda. He was arrested 14 times and would spend three years in Czechoslovak jails. Twice he was a delegate to congresses of the Young Communist League of Czechoslovakia. He became a member of the Communist Party of Czechoslovakia in 1929, and was a delegate to the fifth party congress held the same year. In 1931 he began working at the editorial office of Zakarpatska Pravda. Upon recommendation from the Subcarpathian Ruthenian Regional Committee of the Communist Party of Czechoslovakia, Klympotyuk was sent to Moscow where he worked at the office of the Executive Committee of the Communist International. He studied at the Ukrainian Communist Institute for Journalism in Kharkiv 1932-1935, and would work at the offices of MOPR for a period. In 1936 he returned home and took over the editorship of Zakarpatska Pravda and was the secretary of the Subcarpathian Ruthenian Regional Committee of the Communist Party of Czechoslovakia. He went underground during the Hungarian occupation and by late 1939 escaped to the Soviet Union. Worked at the MOPR central office 1939-1940, and 1940-1941 as a tour guide at the Exhibition of Achievements of National Economy. In 1942 he was appointed editor of the radio station Golos Zakarpattia.
- Kercha, Ivan Greogorevich (1914–1951) –Born in Strabichevo. Studied at Charles University 1932-1937, later worked as assistant at the Slavic Seminary there and was active in Russophile student societies. He was a board member of the Russian National Autonomous Party between 1935 and 1937. During the Hungarian occupation, he worked as literary editor of Russian newspapers and was the secretary of Union of Ugro-Russian Writers. In 1944 he assisted Soviet partisan forces. Kerch took an active part in the establishment of Soviet power in the region, between October and November 1944 he was a member of the Presidium of the Mukachevo City People's Committee, and was a delegate to the First Congress of People's Committees of Transcarpathian Ukraine. He was the editor of Zakarpatska Pravda between October and November 1944. After the merger of Transcarpathia with the Soviet Union, he was head of the Department of Public Education of the oblast until 1949, and then served as the deputy chairman of the Executive Committee of the Oblast Soviet.
- Ratochka, Ivan Ivanovich - Active in the communist organization in Chynadiiovo.
- Vakula, Yuriy Mykhailovych (1909–1972) –Born in Tur'iya Pasika village in a peasant family. Joined the Communist Party of Czechoslovakia. During World War II he organized groups helping Red Army soldiers escape from Hungarian and German camps, and organizing support for Red Army paratroopers entering Transcarpathian Ukraine. After Liberation he was named as chief of the Perechyn District Police. Delegate at the First Congress of People's Committees of Transcarpathian Ukraine. Towards the end of the 1940s he was arrested accused of being a major of the ZUP rebel group, and sentenced to 10 years in prison.
- Teslovych, Vasyl Petrovych (1900–1982) –Born in Svalyava in a peasant family. Founding member of the Communist Party of Czechoslovakia. Elected secretary of the Svalyava District Organization of the Communist Party of Czechoslovakia. Arrested in 1924, after a rally in Svalyava during which Czechoslovak gendarmes killed three workers. Elected secretary of the Svalyava District of the Communist Party of Transcarpathian Ukraine. Delegate at the First Congress of People's Committees of Transcarpathian Ukraine, elected member of the People's Council of Transcarpathian Ukraine (without portfolio).
- Tymko, Oleksa Ivanovich (1904–1960) –Born in Boronyava village, worked as cattle herder in his youth. Joined Communist Party of Czechoslovakia in 1924. Moved to Khust to work in construction, became a labour leader there. At Party School in Kiev 1931-1933. Organized underground activities during Hungarian occupation. Delegate at the First Congress of People's Committees of Transcarpathian Ukraine. Was the First Secretary of the Khust District of the Communist Party of Transcarpathian Ukraine.
- Zhelizko, Ivan Mikhailovich (1907–1982) – Born in Nevitske village, hailing from a peasant family. Joined the Communist Party of Czechoslovakia in 1931. In 1933 led a six-month long strike of the workers at the construction of the Uzhhorod-Nevitske canal. During the Hungarian occupation Zhelizko was imprisoned at the Derdyovteldesh camp in Transylvania, managed to escape before Liberation. Elected chairman of the Nevitske Village People's Committee, and was a delegate at the First Congress of People's Committees of Transcarpathian Ukraine.
- Shimon, Ivan Iosypovych – Born in 1895 in Zhdeniievo, his father was Slovak and his mother German. He worked as a lumberjack before being drafted into the Austro-Hungarian Army in World War I. He would spend five years as a prisoner of war in Russia. He organized a local branch of the Communist Party of Czechoslovakia in Zhdeniievo in 1923, and emerged as an important local labour leader. In 1935 he was elected as a deputy of the Svalyavsky District Council. He led an underground group in the area during the Hungarian occupation. He was arrested in August 1944 and sent to concentration camp.
- Pupchak, Mykhailo Mykhailovych (1897–1982) – Born in Uzhhorod. Delegate at the First Congress of People's Committees of Transcarpathian Ukraine.
- Chernychko, Mykola Ivanovich – Hailed from a poor peasant family. Joined the Communist Party of Czechoslovakia in the early 1920s. In Ukrainian SSR, he was elected deputy chairman of the Mukachevo City Council.
- Handera, Mykhailo Ivanovich (1900–1982) – Hailing from a poor peasant family from Sevlyush. Drafted into Austro-Hungarian Army during World War I, joined the Hungarian Red Army at the end of the war. Became a member of the Communist Party of Czechoslovakia in 1922. Elected to Sevlyush city council in 1927. Suffered economic hardship, as he was blacklisted due to political reasons. Sent to prison camp in Transylvania in 1943. His wife Olena Handera was active liaison for Soviet reconnaissance unit, but was caught by the Hungarian authorities and executed in 1944. Handera managed to escape from captivity just before Liberation. Elected chairman of Sevlyush District People's Committee.
- Fedorik, Ivan Ivanovich (1902–1991) –Peasant from Hanychi village. Was a delegate to the First Congress of People's Committees of Transcarpathian Ukraine.
- Terpol, Marta – Plachý (2021) notes that Terpol's name was removed from the Central Committee list. According to Maryina (2003), Lieutenant-General Lev Mekhlis noted that Terpol had been elected 'in absentia and by mistake', as she was a politically untrained non-party member. She had spent the war years in the Soviet Union, and by the autumn of 1944 she worked at a newspaper of the First Czechoslovak Army Corps.
- Lovha, Ivan Ivanovich (1907–1990) –born in Dovhe, worker. Active in the Communist Party of Czechoslovakia 1934-1935, engaged in underground work and transporting communists in and out of Romania. Drafted into the Hungarian army in 1939, and escaped to the Soviet Union in April 1941. Jailed in the Soviet Union for illegal entry, and sentenced to three years imprisonment by the NKVD. Released from jail on May 9, 1942 on condition that he join military operations behind enemy lines, entered Transcarpathian Ukraine with a Soviet reconnaissance unit in August 1943. When the rest of his reconnaissance unit were caught by the Hungarian forces, Lohda joined a resistance group in Dovhe. In 1944 the Dovhe partisans joined a larger partisan contingent operating the Irshava region. After Liberation, he was the chairman of the Volove People's Committee and was a delegate at the First Congress of People's Committees of Transcarpathian Ukraine. Plachý (2021) notes that Lovha would have been eliminated from the Central Committee list, but he is named as a Central Committee member in some Soviet sources.
- Horkavets, Yuri Vasilyevich (1890–1988) –forest worker from Perechyn. Born in Prešov but grew up in Perechyn, and would spend seven years in Italy after becoming a prisoner of war in World War I. Elected chairman of the Perechyn People's Committee in 1944, and was a peasant delegate at the First Congress of People's Committees of Transcarpathian Ukraine. Plachý (2021) notes that he might have been removed from the Communist Party Central Committee list, and his name is not among the Central Committees named in Soviet-era works like Zakarpatsky Oblast (1982), Vozzʹyednannya Zakarpattya z Radyansʹkoyu Ukrayinoyu u skladi SRSR – torzhestvo istorychnoyi spravedlyvosti (1980) and Narysy istoriyi Zakarpat·sʹkoyi oblasnoyi partiynoyi orhanizatsiyi: 1918-1945 pp (1968).

Turyanytsia was elected as the First Secretary of the Central Committee, Tarakhonych was elected as Second Secretary whilst Weiss and Ledney were elected as Secretaries. Two of the newly-elected Central Committee members - Borkanyuk and Klympotyuk, were not present at the conference but where travelling from Moscow to Uzhhorod, as members of a fact-finding mission of the Foreign Bureua of the Communist Party of Czechoslovakia led by Josef Krosnář.

At a later stage Andrei Andreiko (Chekanyuk) was sent from Kiev to help build the Communist Party of Transcarpathian Ukraine, and he was co-opted into the Central Committee of the party.

== Growth of the party ==
The daily communist newspaper Zakarpatska Pravda became the party organ. Klimpotyuk became the editor of the newspaper. After November 24, 1944 circulation doubled from 4,000 copies daily to 8,000.

KPZU conducted propaganda work for merge with Soviet Ukraine, and the party was setting up People's Committees. The slogan From Uzhhorod to Kremlin - Soviet Land was popularized. Heading the call of the November 19, 1944 KPZU conference the Uzhhorod People's Committee appealed for the convening of the First Congress of People's Committees of Transcarpathian Ukraine (which gathered on November 26, 1944 in Mukachevo). The November 16, 1944 gathering elected a People's Council of Transcarpathian Ukraine (NRZU) as a government body for the region. Out of 17 NRZU members, 10 were communists. KPZU leader Turyanytsia was elected NRZU chairman. The NRZU Deputy Chairmen Petro Sova and Petro Lintur had both recently joined the KPZU.

KPZU membership grew gradually, by the end of 1945 the party had 13 district organizations, 434 primary party organizations and 4,279 party members.

== Merger into the All-Union Communist Party (Bolsheviks) ==
On December 15, 1945 the Central Committee of the All-Union Communist Party (Bolsheviks) (VKP(b)) decided to approve the merger of the Communist Party of Transcarpathian Ukraine into the party. In the same resolution, the VKP(b) Central Committee instructed that a Transcarpathian Regional Party Committee of the Communist Party (Bolsheviks) of Ukraine be formed.

The transfer of members of the Communist Party of Transcarpathian Ukraine into the All-Union Communist Party (Bolsheviks) lasted for months. KPZU members were not accepted into the Soviet party en bloc, but rather each member had to undergo verification. After review, 2,553 Transcarpathian communists were accepted into the Soviet party. Turyanytsia would become the First Secretary of the Transcarpathian Regional Party Committee of the Communist Party (Bolsheviks) of Ukraine.
