= Youth League of Transcarpathian Ukraine =

Youth organization (1944–1946)

The Youth League of Transcarpathian Ukraine (Ukrainian: Спілка Молоді Закарпатської України, abbreviated SMZU) was a youth organization in Transcarpathia between 1944 and 1946. Aligned with the Communist Party of Transcarpathian Ukraine, SMZU supported the call for unification of the region into Soviet Ukraine.

== Founding congress ==
The SMZU founding congress was held on December 17, 1944, in the cinema hall in Mukachevo. The congress was attended by 552 delegates, representing 12 local organizations. 183 of the delegates were students, 167 workers, 110 employees and 92 peasants. 8 of the congress delegates had higher education, 154 had completed secondary education and 390 had primary education. 547 of the delegates were Ukrainians, 4 were Russian and one delegate was Jewish. 501 of the delegates were between 16 and 24 years old, whilst 51 delegates were aged 25 to 30 years old. There were also 218 guests attending the event.

Ivan Turyanitsa, the Secretary of the Communist Party of Transcarpathian Ukraine and chairman of the People's Council of Transcarpathian Ukraine, held a fiery speech at the meeting, arguing that on "[o]ur territory here are Czech reactionaries, who would like to Czechize our people again, who would like to oppress our people again, who would like to spill the blood of our workers and peasants fighting for a better life." The comment on Czech reactionaries referred to a Czechoslovak government delegation visiting Transcarpathian Ukraine, and congress attendees shouted 'death to them!' in response. Turyanitsa called for the building of a people's militia, stating that "if anyone seeks to terrorize us: an eye for an eye, a tooth for a tooth". The Second Secretary of the Communist Party of Transcarpathian Ukraine Dmytro Tarakhonych then addressed the crowd. Tarakhonych argued that the people of Transcarpathian Ukraine had been "subjugated and oppressed by foreign, hostile peoples – the Germans, Magyars, Czechs". A Red Army volunteer addressing the congress decried life under Czech rule, stating that "The Red Army brought us freedom. It must be defended and protected, and this can only be achieved with weapons in hand. The youth of Transcarpathian Ukraine—to the defense of the People's Council!".

A 19-member SMZU Central Committee was elected, including five communists: Tarakhonych, M.I. Babidoric (SMZU secretary), Mykhailo Matskaniuk (SMZU secretary), V.V. Khainas and O.A. Grabar. Other SMZU Central Committee members included V. Balogh, V. Dijanych, V. Zvonar, J. Lakatos, V. Margarita, I. Meshko, M. Oprendyk, M. Simulik and M. Troyan. The congress called for the signing of all people of the Manifesto of the First Congress of People's Committees of Transcarpathian Ukraine (which called for unification with Soviet Ukraine), participation in the activities of the people's committees, implementation of all resolutions and activities of the People's Council of Transcarpathian Ukraine, rebuilding of national economy after the war and voluntary enlistment in the Red Army. For the latter issue, the congress adopted the slogan "The youth of Transcarpathian Ukraine, to the Red Army-Liberators".

== Activities ==
By May 1945, SMZU reportedly had some 10,000 members, including students, workers and peasants. Molod' Zakarpattya ('Youth of Transcarpathia') was published as the organ of the Central Committee of SMZU. SMZU ran a literacy campaign, seeking to set up schools and Ukrainian language study groups.

== Merger with VLKSM ==
SMZU merged with the All-Union Leninist Young Communist League (VLKSM) on January 14, 1946, and SMZU members had their memberships transferred to VLKSM. The process of exchanges of membership cards and creation of VLKSM committees was completed by the time of the first regional conference of VLKSM held on October 5–6, 1946.
