= Vasyl Khaynas =

Ukrainian historian (1919–1999)

Vasyl Vasylovych Khaynas (Ukrainian: Хайнас Василь Васильович; 21 February 1919 – 17 April 1999) was a Ukrainian historian. Khaynas was active in youth movement in Transcarpathia during and after World War II, and joined partisan detachment. He was a youth organizer and newspaper editor in the years just after the war. He would go on to have a long academic career as an historian, writing several works related to the anti-fascist struggle in Transcarpathia and the process of unification of Transcarpathia with Soviet Ukraine.

== Youth ==
He was born in Lokhovo on 21 February 1919, hailing from a peasant family. He studied at village folk school, but his teachers advised him to try to get admitted into a city school. As an external student he managed to write entry exam and get admitted to the third year at the Mukachevo Gymnasium. During his studies at Mukachevo Gymnasium, Khaynas was active in underground politics - distributing literature and painting slogans against the Hungarian occupation of Transcarpathia. He graduated from the Mukachevo Gymnasium in 1941. He joined the Third Partisan Detachment led by Oleksandr Tkanko.

== Post-war years ==
After Liberation, Khaynas was a delegate of the 26 November 1944 First Congress of People's Committees of Transcarpathian Ukraine (which elected the People's Council of Transcarpathian Ukraine as the government of the region and called for unification with Soviet Ukraine). Khaynas joined the Communist Party of Transcarpathian Ukraine in 1944. He worked as the head of the culture section of the newspaper Zakarpatska Pravda during 1944 and 1945. Khaynas was actively involved in the preparations for the 17 December 1944 founding congress of the Youth League of Transcarpathian Ukraine, and at the congress he was elected to the Central Committee of the organization. He was the editor-in-chief of the newspaper Molod' Zakarpattya ('Youth of Transcarpathia') from January 1945 to 1949.

== Historian ==
In 1946 Khaynas was admitted to the Faculty of History of the Uzhhorod State University as a correspondence student. He graduated in 1952. Between 1949 and 1953 he served as the Deputy Head of the department for Cultural and Educational Institutions of the Transcarpathia Regional Executive Committee of Soviets. He studied social science teachers course at the Kiev State University named after Taras Shevchenko 1953–1954. In 1954 he began working at Uzhhorod State University - as a lecturer at the Department of History of the Communist Party of the Soviet Union at Uzhhorod State University (1954–1958), senior lecturer (1958–1960), associate professor (1960–1975) and professor (1975–1986, 1989–1990).

As a historian, Khaynas's main topics of research were Hungary in the interwar period and the history of Transcarpathia 1938–1945. In 1959 he successfully defended his thesis on the process of unification of Transcarpathia with Soviet Ukraine at the Kiev State University named after Taras Shevchenko. The thesis was adapted into a brochure titled Roky velykykh podiy ('Years of Great Events'). From 1964 to 1975 he was the head of the Department of History of the Communist Party of the Soviet Union at Uzhhorod State University. Khaynas successfully defended his doctoral thesis The Struggle of the Progressive Forces of Hungary for a United Workers' and People's Front, Against Fascism and War (1933-1939) at the Lviv State University named after Ivan Franko in 1972. He obtained his doctorate in Historical Sciences in 1975. Obtained Professor degree in 1977.

Khaynas was awarded the anniversary medal Jubilee Medal "In Commemoration of the 100th Anniversary of the Birth of V.I. Lenin" (1970) and the Diploma of the Presidium of the Supreme Soviet of the Ukrainian SSR (1972). Khaynas retired on 30 June 1986, but he would continue to take part in some pedagogical activities, scientific conferences and lectures. He died in Uzhhorod on 17 April 1999.

== Bibliography ==
Khaynas wrote over 70 articles and books. Notable works include,

- Borotʹba trudyashchykh Zakarpattya pid kerivnytstvom Komunistychnoyi partiyi za vozzʺyednannya z Radyansʹkoyu Ukrayinoyu (1944–1945) ('The struggle of the workers of Transcarpathia under the leadership of the Communist Party for reunification with Soviet Ukraine (1944–1945)'), Uzhhorod, 1959
- Zdiysnennya mriyi: Z istoriyi Zakarpatsʹkoyi komunistychnoyi orhanizatsiyi 1938–1945 rokiv ('Realization of a dream: The history of the Transcarpathian communist organization 1938–1945'), Uzhhorod, 1963
- Torzhestvo istorychnoyi spravedlyvosti : Zakonomirnistʹ vozz'yednannya zakhidnoukrayinsʹkykh zemelʹ v yedyniy Ukrayinsʹkiy Radyansʹkiy derzhavi ('The Triumph of Historical Justice: The Lawfulness of the Reunification of Western Ukrainian Lands in a United Ukrainian Soviet State.'), co-author, Lviv, 1968
- Ystoryya Venhryy, Vol. 3 ('History of Hungary'), co-author, Moscow, 1972
- Torzhestvo leninsʹkoyi natsionalʹnoyi polityky na Zakarpatti: Navchalʹnyy posibnyk , prysvyachenyy 30 - richchyu vyzvolennya Zakarpattya Radyansʹkoyu Armiyeyu ta vozz'yednannya yoho z URSR ('The triumph of Lenin's national policy in Transcarpathia: A textbook dedicated to the 30th anniversary of the liberation of Transcarpathia by the Soviet Army and its reunification with the Ukrainian SSR'), co-author, Uzhhorod, 1974
