= József Gáti =

Hungarian politician

Dr. József Gáti (1885, in Ungvár – 1945) was an ethnic Hungarian communist politician from Subcarpathian Rus'. Gáti lived in Užhorod. He held a doctorate in Fine Arts. Around 1910 he worked at the newspaper Határszéli Ujság ('Frontier Newspaper').

He was one of the most active members of the communist group that emerged in Subcarpathian Rus' in 1920. Gáti served as editor of Ungvári Munkás ('Užhorod Workers') and Munkás Újság ('Workers Newspaper'). Gáti was elected to the Chamber of Deputies of Czechoslovakia in the 1924 Užhorod electoral district by-election.
