= Trade Union Council of Transcarpathian Ukraine =

Membership booklet of the Trade Union Council of Transcarpathian Ukraine

The Trade Union Council of Transcarpathian Ukraine (Ukrainian: Рада профспілок Закарпатської України) was a central body of trade unions in Transcarpathian Ukraine in 1945.

== Background ==
During the Hungarian occupation of Transcarpathia, Red Trade Union went underground, engaging in sabotage efforts and joining partisan detachments. After Liberation in 1944, trade union organizations began to re-emerge from the underground. Preparations for the creation of a united trade union organization began in late 1944, with organizing activities taking place at companies, industries, mines and other workplaces. There were 14 primary organizations across Transcarpathia, with a total of 809 union members.

== First Congress of Trade Unions of Transcarpathian Ukraine ==
The First Congress of Trade Unions of Transcarpathian Ukraine was held on January 21, 1945 in the local cinema hall in Mukachevo. The congress was attended by delegates from all 12 districts of Transcarpathian Ukraine. There were 592 voting delegates at the congress, and 78 delegates with consultative vote. Among the delegates and guests there were 396 blue-collar workers, 181 white-collar employees and 93 teachers. Among the persons in attendance, 47 had been partisans during the Second World War.

=== Reunification issue ===
The chairman of the People's Council of Transcarpathian Ukraine, Ivan Turyanitsa, held a speech to the congress titled 'On Reunification of Transcarpathian Ukraine with Soviet Ukraine'. The speech was followed by discussion in plenary session. The congress unanimously decided to endorse the Manifesto adopted by the November 26, 1944 First Congress of Peoples Committees of Transcarpathian Ukraine, calling for merger of the territory into Soviet Ukraine.

=== Tasks of trade unions ===
The congress then heard the report by Ivan Petrushchak titled 'On the tasks of trade unions in Transcarpathian Ukraine'. Reviewing the priorities of trade union work, the congress mainly focused on strategic and tactical questions on how to confront the new context following the end of the war. The congress outlined the role of the trade union movement in the reconstruction effort after the war, to promote economic revival. The congress called trade unions to work together with the People's Council of Transcarpathian Ukraine and local people's committees in order to immediately restore production at nationalized enterprises, to take part in setting up management bodies for nationalized enterprises and appointing key staff for their operation.

At companies that were still in private hands, the trade unions were tasked by the congress to check on the management, and to combat any attempt by capitalists to hide fuel and material reserves, to thwart any attempts to halt production and ensure that essential goods would reach the public. The congress called on resolute combat against speculators. It called on garden land to be distributed to workers, to ensure small-scale vegetable farming. Moreover, the congress adopted specific instructions for the trade unions at each of the key sectors - forestry, food industry, railways, trade, state institutions, etc.

In the cultural field, the congress appealed to trade unions to conduct literacy campaigns among workers, and to organize cultural and sporting activities. The congress defined the political education of the members as the primary task of trade unions.

=== Social policy ===
The congress adopted resolutions on topics relating to labour protection, wages and social security. The meeting called on the People's Council of Transcarpatian Ukraine to introduce 8-hour working day (with a 6-hour working day for adolescents under 18 years of age). Moreover, it demanded two-weeks of paid leave for workers having completed one year of employment at a company, as well as eight weeks of paid leave for pregnant women.

=== Elections ===
The congress elected a 42-member Trade Union Council of Transcarpathian Ukraine. Ivan Petrushchak was elected chairman of the Council. During the war, Petrushschak had been a member of the Czechoslovak National Council in London. He had recently returned home, as part of the Czechoslovak Minister František Němec's administrative delegation. Ivan Shimon was elected deputy chairman of the Central Council. The congress also elected an 11-member Audit Commission, headed by Serena Borkanyuk.

== Organizations ==
The Trade Union Council of Transcarpathian Ukraine held its first meeting on January 28, 1945, in Uzhhorod. At this meeting the organizational structure was defined. The Council was led by a Presidium, and the financial management of the organization was handled by the chairman, secretary and treasurer. Eleven sections were created within the Central Council of Trade Unions, including a sections for teachers, forest workers, chemical industry, construction material industries, agricultural and wine making enterprises, and others. There were ten secretaries working at the Trade Union Council office, each responsible for a section.

== Merger with the Soviet trade union movement ==
On September 12, 1945 the Trade Union Council of Transcarpathian Ukraine, issued an appeal to the All-Union Central Council of Trade Unions with a request to accept the trade unions of Transcarpathia Ukraine into the Soviet trade union movement. As of December 1, 1945 the trade unions in Transcarpathian Ukraine had 21,969 members (out of a total of approximately 49,000 workers in the region). On December 6, 1945 the All-Union Central Council of Trade Unions decided to grant the entry of the Transcarpathian Ukraine trade unions into its fold. On January 26, 1946 the Central Council of Trade Unions of Transcarpathian Ukraine held its Third Extended Plenum, at which it noted 'with great joy' the decision of the All-Union Central Council of Trade Unions to grant the request for entry of the trade unions of Transcarpathian Ukraine into the Soviet trade union movement. The January 26, 1946 plenum a governing body of the Presidium of a regional council of trade unions for the Transcarpathian Region (of the Ukrainian SSR) was elected and nine departments of the regional council were created. A separate district committee was created for railway workers. The regional council of trade unions was constituted at a later stage.

On January 21, 2025 an 80th anniversary celebration on the founding of the Trade Union Council of Transcarpathian Ukraine was organized in Uzhhorod.
