= Marxist Left in Slovakia and the Transcarpathian Ukraine =

Early Czechoslovak far-left political party

The Marxist Left in Slovakia and the Transcarpathian Ukraine (Russian: Марксистская левая Словакии и Закарпатской Украины) was a political organisation in eastern parts of the First Czechoslovak Republic. It was one of the forerunners of the Communist Party of Czechoslovakia.

After the defeat of the Hungarian Soviet Republic, many revolutionary refugees arrived in Czechoslovakia and intermingled with the local political movements. The emergence of the Marxist Left originated in a split in the Slovak Social Democratic Party in 1920, among sections dissatisfied with the counterrevolutionary line of the Czechoslovak Social Democratic Workers Party towards the Hungarian Soviet Republic. A communist split was also brewing in the Hungarian-German Social Democratic Party. During the 1920 election campaign, the Hungarian-German social democrats in the Košice 20th electoral district ran a distinctively pro-communist campaign. The pro-communist forces gathered a majority at the September 1920 party congress of the Hungarian-German Social Democratic Party, declaring the Bratislava reformist leadership expelled. In the region of Subcarpathian Rus', the International Socialist Party of Subcarpathian Rus' had emerged among supporters of the Hungarian Soviet Republic and returned prisoners of war from Soviet Russia.

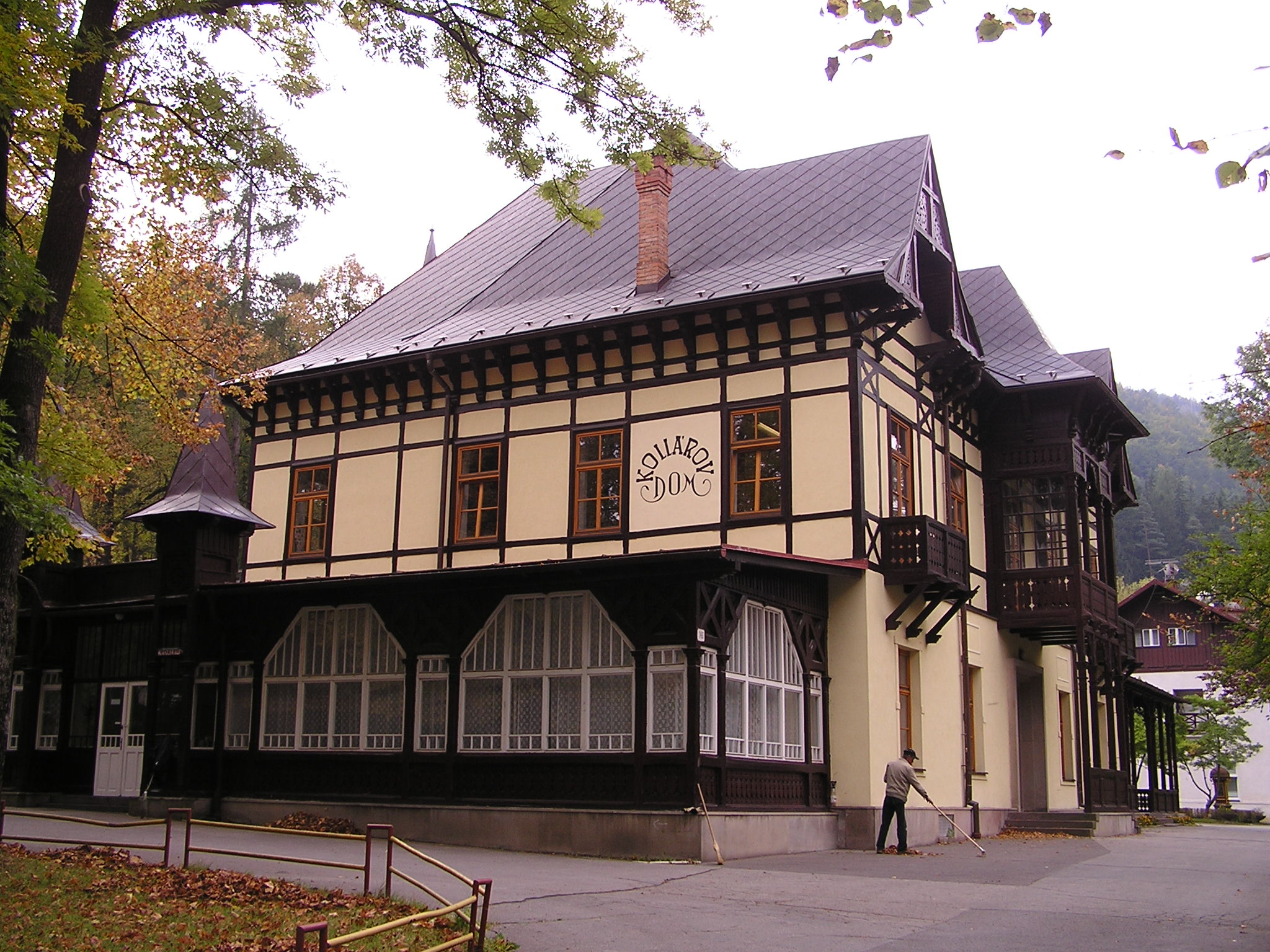
Kollár House, the building where the Marxist Left in Slovakia and the Transcarpathian Ukraine was founded

The Marxist Left in Slovakia and the Transcarpathian Ukraine held its founding congress at the Kollár House in Ľubochňa on January 16, 1921. The founding congress had then been delayed for about two months, due to the December events.

The founding congress reportedly had 149 delegates (according to another account, 153), representing the different nationalities of Slovakia and the Subcarpathian Rus'. Reportedly 88 delegates were Slovaks (or 92, according to the other account), 36 Magyars, 15 Germans, 6 Ukrainians and 4 Jews (from Poale Zion). Invited guests from the Czech Lands also participated in the proceedings. The congress approved a resolution on party organization elaborated by the Magyar section. The congress endorsed the twenty-one conditions of the Communist International, with the exception of the 17th condition (which called on all sections of the International to adopt the name 'Communist Party'). The Ľubochňa congress was of the opinion that the name of the all-Czechoslovak party to be formed had to be decided at a national founding party congress of the new party.

The proceedings of the Ľubochňa congress was broken up by the Gendarmerie. Some of the delegates secretly met the following day, January 17, at Ružomberok. The meeting adopted a programme of action and approved four central press organs of the party; Pravda chudoby, Hlas ľudu, Kassai Munkás and Volksstimme. The Ružomberok meeting set up a Regional Action Committee, to be seated in Ružomberok. Under the Regional Action Committee, the Ružomberok meeting set up five District Executive Committees. One of the District Executive Committees, based in Užhorod, was in-charge of the party activities in the Transcarpathian Ukraine.

The Marxist Left in Slovakia and the Transcarpathian Ukraine sent 56 delegates to the May 14–16 founding conference of the Communist Party of Czechoslovakia.

== Leaders ==
The trade unionist Ivan Prechtl was a prominent labour leader of the party, and had participated in its founding.
