= International Socialist Party of Subcarpathian Rus' =

The International Socialist Party of Subcarpathian Rus' (Russian: Интернациональная социалистическая партия Подкарпатской Руси) was a political party in Subcarpathian Rus', eastern Czechoslovakia. The party was formed in March 1920, by supporters of the now defeated Hungarian Soviet Republic and prisoners of war having returned from Soviet Russia. The party was one of the forerunners of the Communist Party of Czechoslovakia.

== Founding congress ==
The party was founded at a congress held in Uzhgorod on March 21, 1920. Over fifty delegates took part in the congress, representing 69 communist and left socialist party organizations. The founding party congress adopted party statutes and resolved that the party would join the Czechoslovak Social Democratic Workers Party. However, although the International Socialist Party had pledged to merge into the Czechoslovak social democracy, it was politically closer to the Marxist left.

The founding party congress elected a Central Executive Committee consisting of Ivan Mondok (Mukachevo), K. Syuto (Uzhgorod), I. Balash (Chop), F. Astalosh (Svalyava) and M. Shimon (Berehove). The issue of founding a trade union centre for Subcarpathian Rus' was postponed to a later date. Outside the congress venue, some 600 workers gathered to greet the delegates and celebrate first anniversary of the establishment of the Hungarian Soviet Republic.

== Leadership ==
The Central Executive Committee meeting held April 24, 1920 elected I. Mondok and B. Fusi as party secretaries. Hungarian-speaking urban Jews had played a key role in the leadership in the Hungarian Soviet Republic in Subcarpathian Rus', and after the annexation of the area by Czechoslovak forces many joined the International Socialist Party. Around half of the party leadership was Jewish.

== Party press ==
The party published the weekly Munkás Újság ('Workers' Gazette') in Hungarian from Uzhgorod and the Ukrainian-language weekly Pravda ('Truth'), also from Uzhgorod. Whilst Munkás ujság existed before the party was founded, the first issue of Pravda was published on April 30, 1920.

== Elections and May Day ==
The International Socialist Party protested against the suspension of voting in Subcarpathian Rus' in the April 1920 parliamentary election.

On International Workers' Day 1920, the International Socialist Party organized a large manifestation with some 20,000 participants.

== December struggle ==
The International Socialist Party played an important role in Subcarpathian Rus' during the December 1920 general strike. The party organized mass protests in at Uzhgorod, Mukachevo, Svalyava, Perechyn, Berehove, Khust, Solotvyno and Velikiy Bychkov, calling for wage increase, land reform, end to military rule, release of political prisoners and workers' control over industries.

== Merger with the Slovak left ==
On January 16, 1921 the International Socialist Party merged with the leftist faction of the Social Democratic Party of Slovakia, forming the Marxist Left in Slovakia and the Transcarpathian Ukraine. When the Communist Party of Czechoslovakia was established at a congress held May 14–16, 1921 erstwhile International Socialist Party was integrated as of the Subcarpathian regional organization of the new party.
