= Ivan Mondok =

Carpatho-Ukrainian politician (1893–1941)

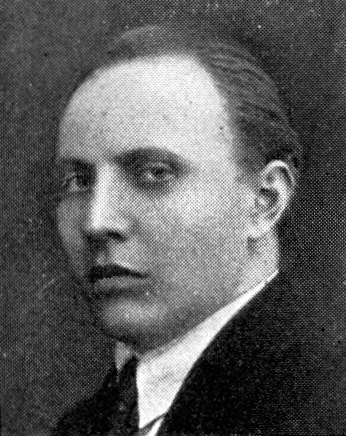
Ivan Mondok

Ivan Mondok (1893 – 1941) was a Carpatho-Ukrainian politician. He served as the secretary of the Transcarpathian regional organization of the Communist Party of Czechoslovakia.

== Biography ==
Born 1893, Mondok was a teacher by profession. During the First World War, he fought in the Austro-Hungarian Army on the Eastern Front. He was captured and spent time in Russia as a prisoner of war. During his stay in Russia, he became a communist.

Mondok arrived in Budapest in 1919, and joined the ranks of the Hungarian Soviet Republic. In 1920, he moved back to Užhorod. He founded the International Socialist Party of Subcarpathian Rus' (one of the forerunners of the Communist Party of Czechoslovakia), and became the secretary of the party.

He became a member of the Central Committee of the Communist Party of Czechoslovakia in 1923.

Mondok was elected to the Czechoslovak Chamber of Deputies in the 1924 Užhorod by-election. He was re-elected in the 1925 Czechoslovak parliamentary election. He served as editor of Karpatska Pravda between 1927 and 1928.

In 1928, he was elected to the International Control Commission of the Communist International. As Klement Gottwald rose to power in the Communist Party of Czechoslovakia, Mondok was stripped of his role in the party hierarchy. Mondok migrated to the Soviet Union in the same year. He became a member of the Communist Party (bolshevik) of Ukraine. He was purged in December 1933, accused by the 13th Plenum of the Executive Committee of the Communist International of collaboration with the class enemy and subsequently arrested. Mondok died in 1941, aged 47 or 48.
