= Czechoslovak Social Democratic Youth =

The Czechoslovak Social Democratic Youth (Czech: Československá sociálně demokratická mládež) was a youth organization in Czechoslovakia. The organization was the youth wing of the Czechoslovak Social Democratic Workers Party. The first organization was dissolved in 1921, when it was transformed into Young Communist League of Czechoslovakia.

The second organization was founded in 1921 and later dissolved in 1936, when it existed inside Czechoslovak Youth Committee. It was also known as the Movement of Democratic Youth.

During 1945–1948, the Social Democratic Youth branch existed as part of the Union of Czech Youth.
