= Munkás Újság =

Czechoslovak communist newspaper

Munkás Újság (Hungarian pronunciation: [ˈmuŋkaːʃ ˈuːjʃaːɡ], 'Workers' Gazette') was a Hungarian language weekly newspaper published from Uzhgorod, Czechoslovakia 1920-1938.

The first issue was published January 31, 1920, then known as Ungvári Munkás ('Uzhgorod Worker'). The newspaper was an organ of the International Socialist Party of Subcarpathian Rus', becoming an organ of the Communist Party of Czechoslovakia in 1921. Key personalities in the editing of the newspaper were Béla Illés, József Gáti and Herman Fejér. Although the newspaper was subject to censorship from time to time, it continued publishing up to October 23, 1938.

The newspaper re-appeared for a few months in 1945. On December 5, 1945 it was replaced by Kárpáti Igaz Szó (the Hungarian edition of Zakarpatska Pravda).
