= Young Communist League of Czechoslovakia =

Czechoslovak communist youth organisation

- Founded: 1921
- Dissolved: 1936
- Succeeded by: Youth League (Czech); Slovak Youth League; German Youth; Hungarian Youth League
- Headquarters: Prague
- Ideology: Communism; Marxism–Leninism
- Mother party: Communist Party of Czechoslovakia
- International affiliation: Young Communist International

The Young Communist League of Czechoslovakia (Czech: Komunistický svaz mládeže Československa), nicknamed Komsomol, was a youth organisation in Czechoslovakia, active between 1921 and 1936. The organisation was the youth wing of the Communist Party of Czechoslovakia. The organisation was the Czechoslovak section of the Young Communist International.

In October 1920 the majority of the Czechoslovak Social Democratic Youth voted to approve the twenty-one conditions of the Communist International and to join the Young Communist International. The Young Communist League of Czechoslovakia was founded on 20 February 1921, through the merger of Czech, Slovak, and German youth groups. The membership fluctuated between 8,000 and 13,000, later reaching a peak of about 24,000 members in the 1930s. In 1922 a pioneer movement was started as a subsection of the Young Communist League.

Jan Šverma, K. Aksamit, Emil Hršel, O. Synek, V. Synek, J. Zika, J. Černý and M. Krásný were leading figures in the Young Communist League. The organisation issued several publications, such as Mladý komunista, Komunistická mládež, Pravda mládeže, and Mladá garda.

The organisation was dissolved in 1936, being substituted by different ethnic youth organisations; the Youth League (Czech), the Slovak Youth League, the German Youth and the Hungarian Youth League.
