= Ivan Turyanytsia =

Czechoslovak, Ukrainian and Soviet politician

1st secretary of Zakarpattia regional committee of CP(b)U until 1946 as 1st secretary of the Communist Party of Transcarpathian Ukraine
- In office 1944–1948
- Preceded by: position created
- Succeeded by: Ivan Kompanets

Chairman of the People's Council of Zakarpattia Ukraine
- In office 1944–1946
- Preceded by: position created
- Succeeded by: unknown

Chairman of the Ispolkom of the Zakarpattia Oblast Council
- In office 1946–1951
- Preceded by: position created
- Succeeded by: Ivan Vash
- In office 1952–1955
- Preceded by: Ivan Vash
- Succeeded by: Ivan Harahonych

Personal details
- Born: 25 May 1901 Rápigy, Máramaros County, Austria-Hungary
- Died: 27 March 1955 (aged 53) Uzhhorod, Ukrainian SSR, Soviet Union
- Party: Communist Party of Czechoslovakia (1925–1939); All-Union Communist Party (bolsheviks) (1939–1955); Communist Party (b) of Ukraine

Ivan Ivanovych Turyanytsia (Ukrainian: Іван Іванович Туряниця; 25 May 1901 – 27 March 1955) was a Czechoslovak, Ukrainian and Soviet politician, who served as the chairman of the People's Council of Zakarpattia Ukraine from 1944 to 1946 and the First secretary of the Communist Party of Zakarpattia Ukraine.

On several occasions he was elected to the Central Committee of the Communist Party (b) of Ukraine. During World War I, he served in the Austro-Hungarian army, and in 1943–1944 he commanded a brigade of the Soviet Czechoslovak Corps.

== Biography ==
Turyanytsia was born on 25 May 1901 in a village of Rápigy (now Ryapid) near Munkács, Hungary, Austria-Hungary (now Mukachevo, Ukraine).

During World War I, he served as a soldier of the Austro-Hungarian army, later in 1919 in the Zakarpattia Red Guards of the Hungarian Soviet Republic. The same year Turyanytsia was arrested and placed in concentration camp in Prešov, but by December 1919 he was released.

In 1924–1925 Turyanytsia served in the Czechoslovak Army and after that joined the Communist Party of Czechoslovakia (KSČ). In 1927–1928 he was a chairman of the Mukacheve Trade Union of Builders and then in 1928–1929 a secretary of the Mukacheve city committee of the KSČ. In 1929 Turyanytsia was arrested again, but then soon was released.

In 1930 Turyanytsia was a secretary of the Uzhhorod zupa committee KSČ. In 1930–1933 he studied in the Soviet Union and graduated the Kharkiv Communist Institute of Journalism. In 1933–1939 he was a secretary of the Subcarpathian regional council of Red Trade Unions. During that period in 1936 he was arrested one more time, but again soon was released.

In March 1939 Turyanytsia emigrated to the Soviet Union and joined the International Red Aid organization (1939–1940). In 1940–1941 he worked as an economist planner at the Steam Locomotive Factory of the October Revolution (today Luhanskteplovoz) in Voroshilovgrad.

In 1943–1944, Turyanytsia commanded the 3rd Brigade of the Soviet Czechoslovak Corps. Upon liberation of the Carpathian Ruthenia in 1944, he became the 1st secretary of the Communist Party of Zakarpattia Ukraine and a chairman of the People's Council of Zakarpattia Ukraine. In 1944–1945, he also played a key role in the deportation of the local Hungarian and German-speaking civilian population out of Zakarpattia first to Szolyva, then to Galicia and the rest of the Soviet Union.

Since 1947, Turyanytsia was a member of the Presidium of the Verkhovna Rada and since 1949 the Central Committee of the Communist Party (Bolsheviks) of Ukraine. He was a member of the Supreme Soviet of the Soviet Union 2nd and 3rd convocations and the Verkhovna Rada's 2nd to 4th convocations.

He died on 27 March 1955 in Uzhhorod.
