= Zakarpattia Regional Committee of the Communist Party of Ukraine =

The Zakarpattia Regional Committee of the Communist Party of Ukraine, commonly referred to as the Zakarpattia CPU obkom, was the position of highest authority in the Zakarpattia Oblast, in the Ukrainian SSR of the Soviet Union.

On 19 November 1944 there was established position of the First Secretaries of the Communist Party of Zakarpattian Ukraine. On 26 November 1944 there was established People's Council of Zakarpattian Ukraine which declared its intention to unite Zakarpattian Ukraine with the Ukrainian SSR. On 29 June 1945 Czechoslovakia and the Soviet Union signed the treaty transferring Zakarpattian Ukraine to the Soviet Union, which was ratified on 30 January 1946. On 30 January 1946 Zakarpattian Ukraine had officially become Zakarpattia Oblast. On 26 February 1946 the position of the First Secretary of the Communist Party of Zakarpattian Ukraine was merged into the Communist Party of Ukraine as the First Secretary of the Communist Party of Zakarpattia Oblast.

The First Secretary was a de facto appointed position usually by the Central Committee of the Communist Party of Ukraine or the First Secretary of the Republic.

== List of First Secretaries of the Communist Party of Zakarpattia Oblast (Zakarpattian Ukraine) ==
Name	Term of Office		Life years
Name	Start	End	Life years
First Secretaries of the Oblast Committee of the Communist Party
Ivan Turyanytsia	19 November 1944	27 January 1948	1901–1955
Ivan Kompanets	27 January 1948	7 September 1952	1904–1969
Ivan Vash	7 September 1952	28 May 1959	1904–1966
Pylyp Shcherbak	28 May 1959	February 1962	1907–1969
Yuriy Ilnytskyi	5 February 1962	2 December 1980	1924–2016
Henrikh Bandrovskyi	2 December 1980	9 February 1990	1929–2008
Mykhailo Voloshchuk	9 February 1990	2 July 1991	1934–2017
Vasyl Khymynets	2 July 1991	26 August 1991	1948–

== See also ==
- Zakarpattia Oblast

== Sources ==
- World Statesmen.org
