= Transcarpathia =

Historic region located in the northeastern Carpathian Mountains

Coordinates: 48°20′N 23°14′E

Transcarpathia Закарпаття Zakarpatsko
- Historical area
- Zakarpattia Oblast
- Transcarpathia (Zakarpattia) in modern-day Ukraine

Area
  - Total: 12,800 km^{2} (4,900 sq mi)

Population
  - Estimate: 1,240,000
- Demonym: Transcarpathians
- Time zone: Eastern European Standard Time

Transcarpathia (Note: Also Transcarpathian Ruthenia, Transcarpathian Ukraine, Carpathian Ruthenia, Rusinsko, Subcarpathian Rus', Subcarpathia) (Note: Ukrainian: Закарпаття, romanized: Zakarpattia, pronounced [zɐkɐrˈpɑtʲːɐ]; Rusyn: Пудкарпатьска Русь, romanized: Pudkarpat'ska Rus'; Slovak: Podkarpatská Rus; Hungarian: Kárpátalja; Romanian: Transcarpatia; Polish: Zakarpacie; Russian: Закарпатье, romanized: Zakarpat'ye; Czech: Podkarpatská Rus; German: Karpatenukraine) is a historical region on the border between Central and Eastern Europe, mostly located in western Ukraine's Zakarpattia Oblast.

From the Hungarian conquest of the Carpathian Basin (at the end of the 9th century) to the end of World War I (Treaty of Trianon in 1920), most of this region was part of the Kingdom of Hungary. In the interwar period, it was part of the First and Second Czechoslovak Republics. Before World War II, the region was annexed by the Kingdom of Hungary once again when Germany dismembered the Second Czechoslovak Republic.

After the war, it was annexed by the Soviet Union and became part of the Ukrainian Soviet Socialist Republic. Transcarpathia remained part of Ukraine as the Soviet Union dissolved in 1991.

It is an ethnically diverse region, inhabited mostly by people who regard themselves as ethnic Ukrainians, Rusyns, Hungarians, Romanians, Slovaks, and Poles. It also has small communities of Jewish and Romani minorities. Prior to World War II, many more Jews lived in the region, constituting over 13% of its total population in 1930. The most commonly spoken languages are Rusyn, Ukrainian, Hungarian, Romanian, Slovak, and Polish.

== Toponymy ==
The name Carpathian Ruthenia is sometimes used for the contiguous cross-border area of Ukraine, Slovakia and Poland inhabited by Ruthenians. The local Ruthenian population self-identifies in different ways: some consider themselves to be a separate and unique Slavic group of Rusyns and some consider themselves to be both Rusyns and Ukrainians. To describe their home region, most of them use the term Zakarpattia (English: Trans-Carpathia, lit. 'beyond the Carpathian mountains'). This is contrasted implicitly with Prykarpattia (English: Ciscarpathia, lit. 'near the Carpathians'), an unofficial geographical region in Ukraine, to the immediate north-east of the central area of the Carpathian Range, and potentially including its foothills, the Subcarpathian basin and part of the surrounding plains.

From a Hungarian (and to an extent Slovak and Czech) perspective, the region is usually described as Subcarpathia (literally "below the Carpathians"), although technically this name refers only to a long, narrow basin that flanks the northern side of the mountains.

During the period in which the region was administered by the Hungarian states, it was officially referred to in Hungarian as Kárpátalja (literally: "the base of the Carpathians") or the north-eastern regions of medieval Upper Hungary, which in the 16th century was contested between the Habsburg monarchy and the Ottoman Empire.

The Romanian name of the region is Maramureș, which is geographically located in the eastern and south-eastern portions of the region.

During the period of Czechoslovak administration in the first half of the 20th century, the region was referred to for a while as Rusinsko (Ruthenia) or Karpatske Rusinsko, and later as Subcarpathian Rus (Czech and Slovak: Podkarpatská Rus) or Subcarpathian Ukraine (Czech and Slovak: Podkarpatská Ukrajina), and from 1928 as Subcarpathian Ruthenian Land. (Czech: Země podkarpatoruská, Slovak: Krajina podkarpatoruská).

Alternative, unofficial names used in Czechoslovakia before World War II included Subcarpathia (Czech and Slovak: Podkarpatsko), Transcarpathia (Czech and Slovak: Zakarpatsko), Transcarpathian Ukraine (Czech and Slovak: Zakarpatská Ukrajina), Carpathian Rus/Ruthenia (Czech and Slovak: Karpatská Rus) and, occasionally, Hungarian Rus/Ruthenia (Czech: Uherská Rus; Slovak: Uhorská Rus).

The region declared its independence as Carpatho-Ukraine on 15 March 1939, but was occupied and annexed by Hungary on the same day, and remained under Hungarian control until the end of World War II. During this period the region continued to possess a special administration and the term Kárpátalja was locally used.

In 1944–1946, the region was occupied by the Soviet Army and was a separate political formation known as Transcarpathian Ukraine or Subcarpathian Ruthenia. During this period the region possessed some form of quasi-autonomy with its own legislature, while remaining under the governance of the Communist Party of Transcarpathian Ukraine. After the signing of a treaty between Czechoslovakia and the Soviet Union as well as the decision of the regional council, Transcarpathia joined the Ukrainian SSR as the Zakarpattia Oblast.

The region has subsequently been referred to as Zakarpattia (Ukrainian: Закарпаття) or Transcarpathia, and on occasions as Carpathian Rus’ (Ukrainian: Карпатська Русь, romanized: Karpatska Rus), Transcarpathian Rus’ (Ukrainian: Закарпатська Русь, romanized: Zakarpatska Rus), or Subcarpathian Rus’ (Ukrainian: Підкарпатська Русь, romanized: Pidkarpatska Rus).

== Geography ==
Lands bordering the Carpathian Ruthenia region

Carpathian Ruthenia rests on the southern slopes of the eastern Carpathian Mountains, bordered to the east and south by the Tisza River, and to the west by the Hornád and Poprad Rivers. The region borders Poland, Slovakia, Hungary, and Romania, and makes up part of the Pannonian Plain.

The region is predominantly rural and infrastructurally underdeveloped. The landscape is mostly mountainous; it is geographically separated from Ukraine, Slovakia, and Romania by mountains, and from Hungary by the Tisza river. The two major cities are Uzhhorod and Mukachevo, both with populations around 100,000. The population of the other five cities (including Khust and Berehove) varies between 10,000 and 30,000. Other urban and rural populated places have a population of less than 10,000.

== History ==
=== Prehistoric cultures ===
During the Late Bronze Age in the 2nd millennium BC, the region was characterized by Stanove culture; however, it only gained more advanced metalworking skills with the arrival of Thracians from the South with Kushtanovytsia culture in the 6th-3rd century BC. In the 5th-3rd century BC, Celts arrived from the West, bringing iron-melting skills and La Tène culture. A Thracian-Celtic symbiosis existed for a time in the region, after which appeared the Bastarnae. At that time, the Iranian-speaking Scythians and later a Sarmatian tribe called the Iazyges were present in the region. Proto-Slavic settlement began between the 2nd-century BCE and 2nd century CE, and during the Migration Period, the region was traversed by Huns and Gepids (4th century) and Pannonian Avars (6th century).

=== Slavic settlement ===
By the 8th and 9th century, the valleys of the Northern and Southern slopes of the Carpathian Mountains were "densely" settled by Slavic tribe of White Croats, who were closely related to East Slavic tribes who inhabited Prykarpattia, Volhynia, Transnistria and Dnieper Ukraine. Whereas some White Croats remained behind in Carpathian Ruthenia, others moved southward into the Balkans in the 7th century. Those who remained were conquered by Kievan Rus' in the late 10th century.

=== Hungarian arrival ===
In 896 the Hungarians crossed the Carpathian Range and migrated into the Pannonian Basin. Nestor's Chronicle wrote that Hungarian tribes had to fight against the Volochi and settled among Slavs when on their way to Pannonia. Prince Laborec fell from power under the efforts of the Hungarians and the Kievan forces. According to Gesta Hungarorum, the Hungarians defeated a united Bulgarian and Byzantine army led by Salan in the early 10th century on the plains of Alpár, who ruled over territory that was finally conquered by Hungarians. During the tenth and for most of the eleventh century the territory remained a borderland between the Kingdom of Hungary to the south and the Kievan Rus' Principality of Halych to the north.

Slavs from the north (Galicia) and east—who actually arrived from Podolia via the mountain passes of Transylvania—continued to settle in small numbers in various parts of the Carpathian borderland, which the Hungarians and other medieval writers referred to as the Marchia Ruthenorum—the Rus' March. These new immigrants, from the north and east, like the Slavs already living in Carpathian Ruthenia, had by the eleventh century come to be known as the people of Rus', or Rusyns. Local Slavic nobility often intermarried with the Hungarian nobles to the south. Prince Rostislav, a Ruthenian noble unable to continue his family's rule of Kiev, governed a great deal of Transcarpathia from 1243 to 1261 for his father-in-law, Béla IV of Hungary. The territory's ethnic diversity increased with the influx of some 40,000 Cuman settlers, who came to the Pannonian Basin after their defeat by Vladimir II (Monomakh) in the 12th century and their ultimate defeat at the hands of the Mongols in 1238.

During the early period of Hungarian administration, part of the area was included into the Gyepű border region, while the other part was under county authority and was included into the counties of Ung, Borsova and Szatmár. Later, the county administrative system was expanded to the whole of Transcarpathia, and the area was divided between the counties of Ung, Bereg, Ugocsa, and Máramaros. At the end of the 13th and beginning of the 14th century, during the collapse of the central power in the Kingdom of Hungary, the region was part of the domains of semi-independent oligarchs Amadeus Aba and Nicholas Pok. Although King Leo I of Galicia–Volhynia (Lev Danylovych) attempted to extend his influence over parts of the Carpathian region during the late 13th century, there is no reliable historical evidence that north-western Carpathian Ruthenia was permanently annexed to his kingdom. A document from 1299 proves vassal relations of the Count of Bereg with "Leo, Prince of Ruthenians", but Galician rulers are not mentioned in latter documents from the area. Contemporary Hungarian royal charters from the period confirm that the region — including key fortresses like Huszt and Munkács — remained under the control of the Kingdom of Hungary.

Historians such as Gyula Kristó and Pál Engel agree that Leo's interventions were temporary and opportunistic, taking advantage of internal conflicts within Hungary, but they did not lead to lasting occupation.

Thus, the claim that north-western Carpathian Ruthenia belonged to the Kingdom of Galicia–Volhynia between 1280 and 1320 is not supported by primary sources or mainstream historical scholarship.

The assumption that Transcarpathia briefly came under the rule of the Kingdom of Galicia–Volhynia is, in this context, primarily the result of Ukrainian historiography’s attempt to establish historical rights and continuity over the region — suggesting that "medieval Ukraine" had annexed it even before 1946.

This narrative is further reinforced by the frequent appearance of Transcarpathia on maps of Kievan Rus' as if it had been part of, or directly linked to, Kievan Rus'. However, this claim is not supported by either archaeological or historical evidence. On the contrary, both the historical sources — which indicate the settlement of Ruthenians in the region during the 13th and 14th centuries — and the archaeological record — which shows a lack of Orthodox church remains from that period — argue against such interpretations.

Between the 12th and 15th centuries, the area was probably colonized by Eastern Orthodox groups of Vlach (Romanian) highlanders with accompanying Ruthenian populations. Initially, the Romanians were organized into the Voivodeship of Maramureș, formally integrated into Hungary in 1402. All the groups, including local Slavic population, blended together, creating a distinctive culture from the main Ruthenian-speaking areas. Over time, because of geographical and political isolation from the main Ruthenian-speaking territory, the inhabitants developed distinctive features.

=== Part of Hungary and Transylvania ===
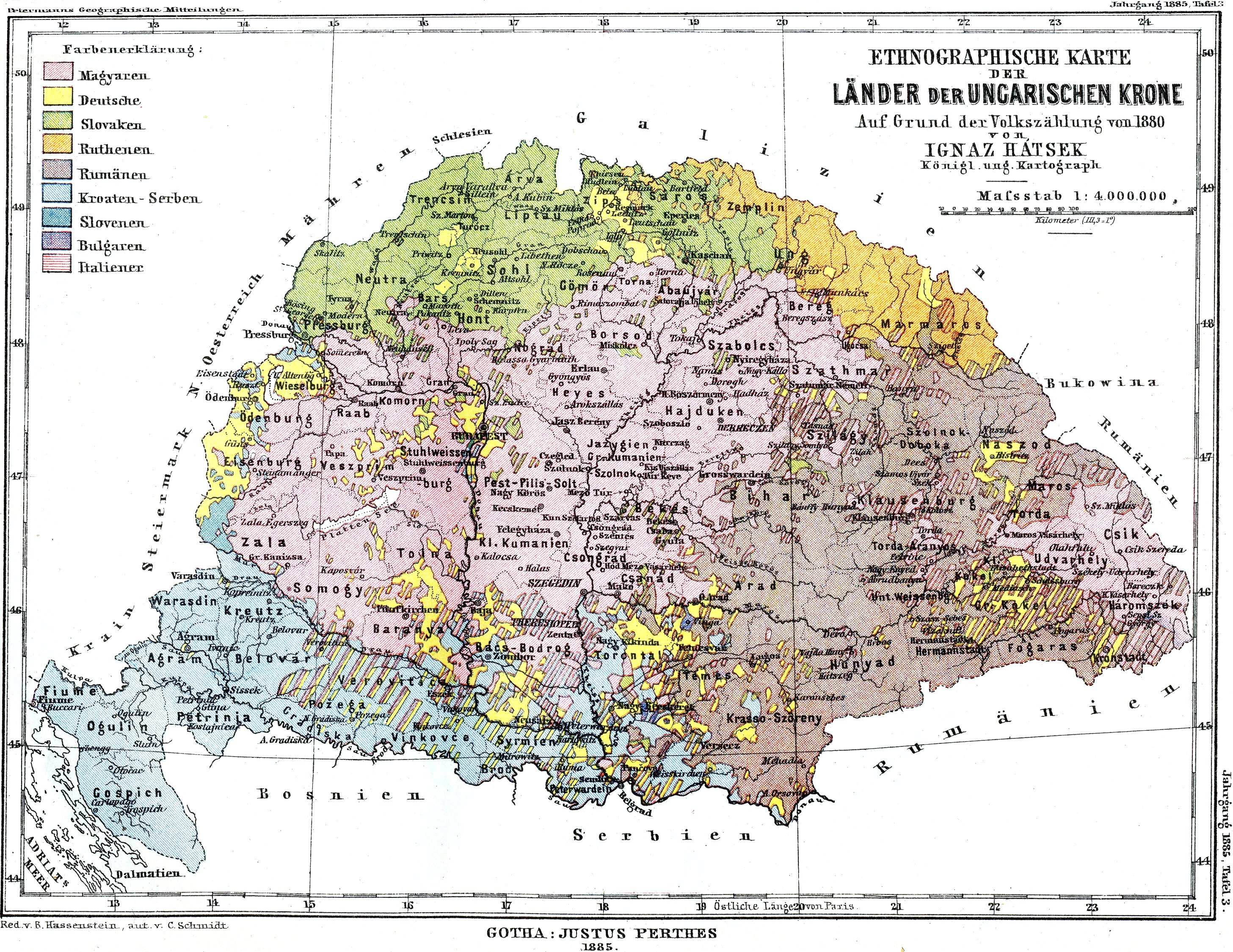
1885 ethnographic map of the Hungarian Crown Ruthenians

In 1526 the region was divided between the Habsburg Kingdom of Hungary and the Eastern Hungarian Kingdom. Beginning in 1570 the latter transformed to the Principality of Transylvania, which soon fell under Ottoman suzerainty. The part of Transcarpathia under Habsburg administration was included into the Captaincy of Upper Hungary, which was one of the administrative units of the Habsburg Kingdom of Hungary. During this period, an important factor in the Ruthenian cultural identity, namely religion, came to the forefront. The Union of Brest (1595) and Union of Uzhhorod (1646) were instituted, causing the Byzantine Orthodox Churches of Carpathian and Transcarpathian Rus' to come under the jurisdiction of Rome, thus establishing the so-called "Unia" of Eastern Catholic churches, the Ruthenian Catholic Church and the Ukrainian Greek Catholic Church.

In the 17th century (until 1648) the entire region was part of the Principality of Transylvania and between 1682 and 1685 its north-western part was administered by the Ottoman vassal state of Upper Hungary, while the south-eastern parts remained under the administration of Transylvania. From 1699 the entire region eventually became part of the Habsburg monarchy, divided between the Kingdom of Hungary and the Principality of Transylvania. Later, the entire region was included into the Kingdom of Hungary. Between 1850 and 1860 the Habsburg Kingdom of Hungary was divided into five military districts, and the region was part of the Military District of Kaschau.

=== Lands of the Crown of Saint Stephen ===
Former Hungarian counties in Zakarpattia Oblast: Ung Bereg / Ugocsa Northern Maramureș

After 1867, the region was administratively included into Transleithania or the Hungarian part of Austria-Hungary.

In the 19th and 20th centuries, many nationalist groups vied for unification or alignment with many different possible nationalities, all arguing that the Rus people would be better off uniting with that nation for security or staying within the nation of Hungary. Many of these groups utilized the ethnic makeup of the region, with ideas such as the Lemko-Boiko-Hutsul schema looking to prove the Slavic nature of the Rus, and therefore justifying union with Russia (or later a Ukrainian state) under the claim that the Rus were part of that Slavic cultural sphere. These Rus or Ruthenians would argue this point until the early 1900s when action would be taken.

In 1910, the population of Transcarpathia was 605,942, of which 330,010 (54.5%) were speakers of Ruthenian, 185,433 (30.6%) were speakers of Hungarian, 64,257 (10.6%) were speakers of German, 11,668 (1.9%) were speakers of Romanian, 6,346 (1%) were speakers of Slovak or Czech, and 8,228 (1.4%) were speakers of other languages.

- Ung County, Ungvár (Uzhhorod)
- Bereg County, Beregszász (Berehove)
- Ugocsa County, Nagyszőllős (Vynohradiv)
- Máramaros County (only the northern part), Máramarossziget (Sighetu Marmației)

=== Transitional period (1918–1919) ===
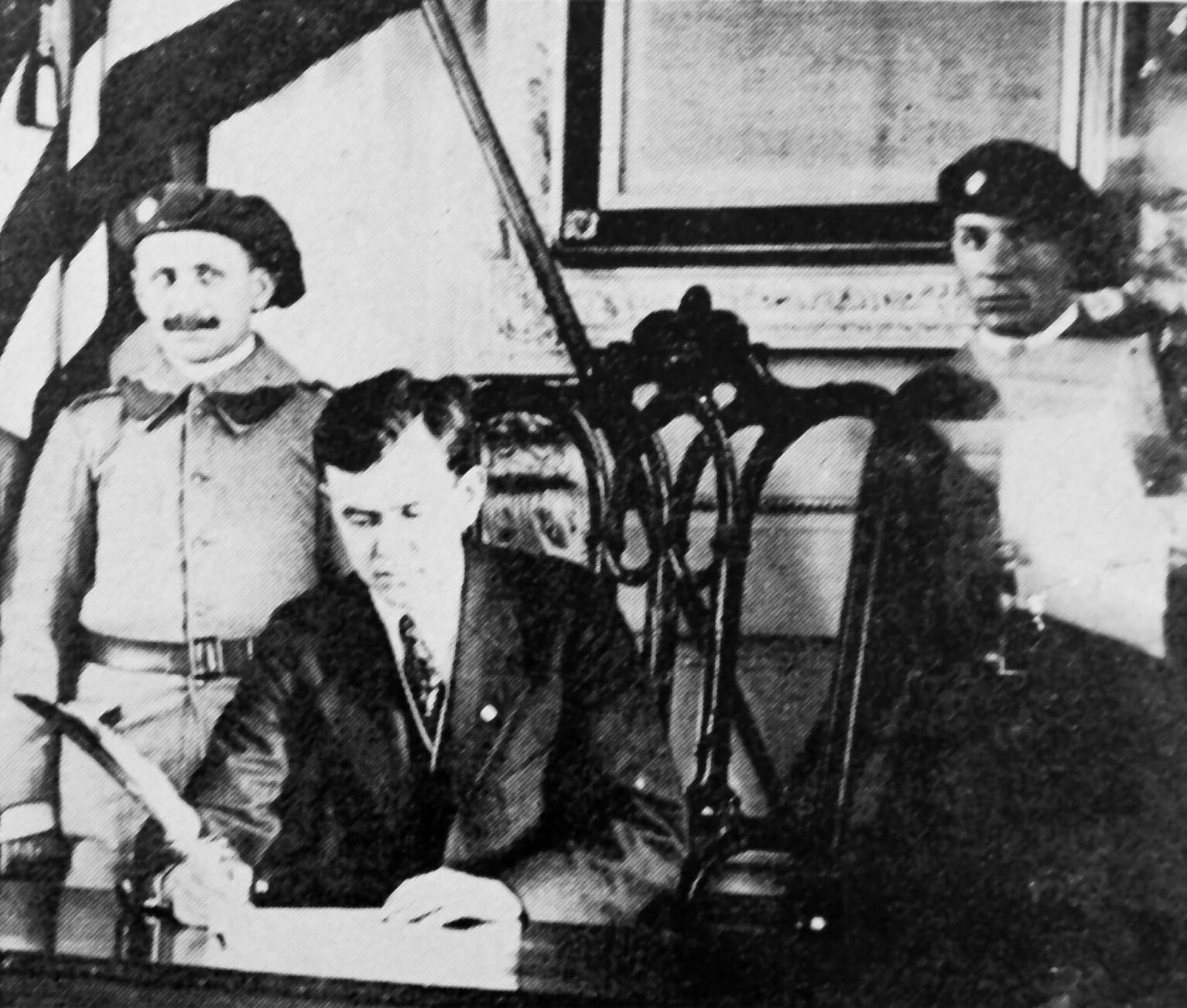
Gregory Žatkovich signing the Declaration of Common Aims at Independence Hall, Philadelphia 26 Oct 1918.

After World War I, the Austro-Hungarian monarchy collapsed and the region was briefly (in 1918 and 1919) claimed as part of the independent West Ukraine Republic. However, for most of this period the region was controlled by the newly formed independent Hungarian Democratic Republic, with a short period of West Ukrainian control.

On 8 November 1918, the first National Council (the Ľubovňa Council, which later reconvened as the Prešov Council) was held in western Ruthenia. The first of many councils, it simply stated the desire of its members to separate from the newly formed Hungarian state but did not specify a particular alternative—only that it must involve the right to self-determination.

Other councils, such as the Carpatho-Ruthenian National Council meetings in Huszt (Khust) (November 1918), called for unification with the West Ukrainian People's Republic. Only in early January 1919 were the first calls heard in Ruthenia for union with Czechoslovakia.

==== Rus'ka Krajina ====
Throughout November and the following few months, councils met every few weeks, calling for various solutions. Some wanted to remain part of the Hungarian Democratic Republic, but with greater autonomy; the most notable of these, the Uzhhorod Council (9 November 1918), declared itself the representative of the Rusyn people and began negotiations with Hungarian authorities. These negotiations ultimately resulted in the passage of Law no. 10 by the Hungarian government on 21 December 1918, thereby establishing the autonymous Rusyn province of Rus'ka Krajina from the Rusyn-inhabited parts of four eastern counties (Máramaros County, Ugocha County, Bereg County, Ung County.

On 5 February 1919, a provisional government for Rus'ka Krajina was established. The "Rus'ka rada" (or Rusyn Council), was made up of 42 representatives from the four constituent counties and headed by a chairman, Orest Sabov, and vice-chairman, Avhustyn Shtefan. The following month, on 4 March, elections were held for a formal diet of 36 deputies. Upon election, the new diet requested the Hungarian government define the borders of the autonomous region, which had not yet been elaborated; without an established territory, the deputies argued that the diet was useless.

On 21 March 1919, the Democratic Republic of Hungary was replaced by the Hungarian Soviet Republic, which then announced the existence of a "Soviet Rus'ka Krajina". Elections organized by the new Hungarian government of a people's soviet (council) on 6 and 7 April 1919 led to Rus'ka Krajina then had two councils: the original diet, and the newly elected soviet. Representatives from both councils then decided to join, forming the Uriadova rada ("Governing Council) of Rus'ka Krajina.

==== Fall of Soviet Hungary ====
Prior to this, in July 1918, Rusyn immigrants in the United States had convened and called for complete independence. Failing that, they would try to unite with Galicia and Bukovina; and failing that, they would demand autonomy, though they did not specify under which state. They approached the American government and were told that the only viable option was unification with Czechoslovakia. Their leader, Gregory Zatkovich, then signed the "Philadelphia Agreement" with Czechoslovak President Tomáš Garrigue Masaryk, guaranteeing Rusyn autonomy upon unification with Czechoslovakia on 25 October 1918. A referendum was held among American Rusyn parishes in November 1918, with a resulting 67% in favor. Another 28% voted for union with Ukraine, and less than one percent each for Galicia, Hungary and Russia. Less than 2% desired complete independence.

In April 1919, Czechoslovak control on the ground was established, when Czechoslovak Army troops acting in coordination with Royal Romanian Army forces arriving from the east—both acting under French auspices—entered the area. In a series of battles they defeated and crushed the local militias of the newly formed Hungarian Soviet Republic, which had created the Slovak Soviet Republic and whose proclaimed aim was to "unite the Hungarian, Rusyn and Jewish toilers against the exploiters of the same nationalities". Communist sympathizers accused the Czechoslovaks and Romanians of atrocities, such as public hangings and the clubbing to death of wounded prisoners. This fighting prevented the arrival of Soviet aid, for which the Hungarian Communists hoped in vain; the Bolsheviks were also too preoccupied with their own civil war to assist.

In May 1919, a Central National Council convened in the United States under Zatkovich and voted unanimously to accept the admission of Carpathian Ruthenia to Czechoslovakia. Back in Ruthenia, on 8 May 1919, a general meeting of representatives from all the previous councils was held, and declared that "The Central Russian National Council... completely endorse the decision of the American Uhro-Rusin Council to unite with the Czech-Slovak nation on the basis of full national autonomy." Note that the Central Russian National Council was an offshoot of the Central Ruthenian National Council and represented a Carpathian branch of the Russophiles movement that existed in the Austrian Galicia. (Note: Similarly as in Galicia, Subcarpathian Ruthenia also had two main movements for self determination (Ukrainophile and Russophile).)

The Hungarian left-wing writer Béla Illés claimed that the meeting was little more than a farce, with various "notables" fetched from their homes by police, formed into a "National Assembly" without any semblance of a democratic process, and effectively ordered to endorse incorporation into Czechoslovakia. He further asserts that Clemenceau had personally instructed the French general on the spot to get the area incorporated into Czechoslovakia "at all costs", so as to create a buffer separating Soviet Ukraine from Hungary, as part of the French anti-Communist "Cordon sanitaire" policy, and that it was the French rather than the Czechoslovaks who made the effective decisions.

=== Part of Czechoslovakia (1920–1938) ===
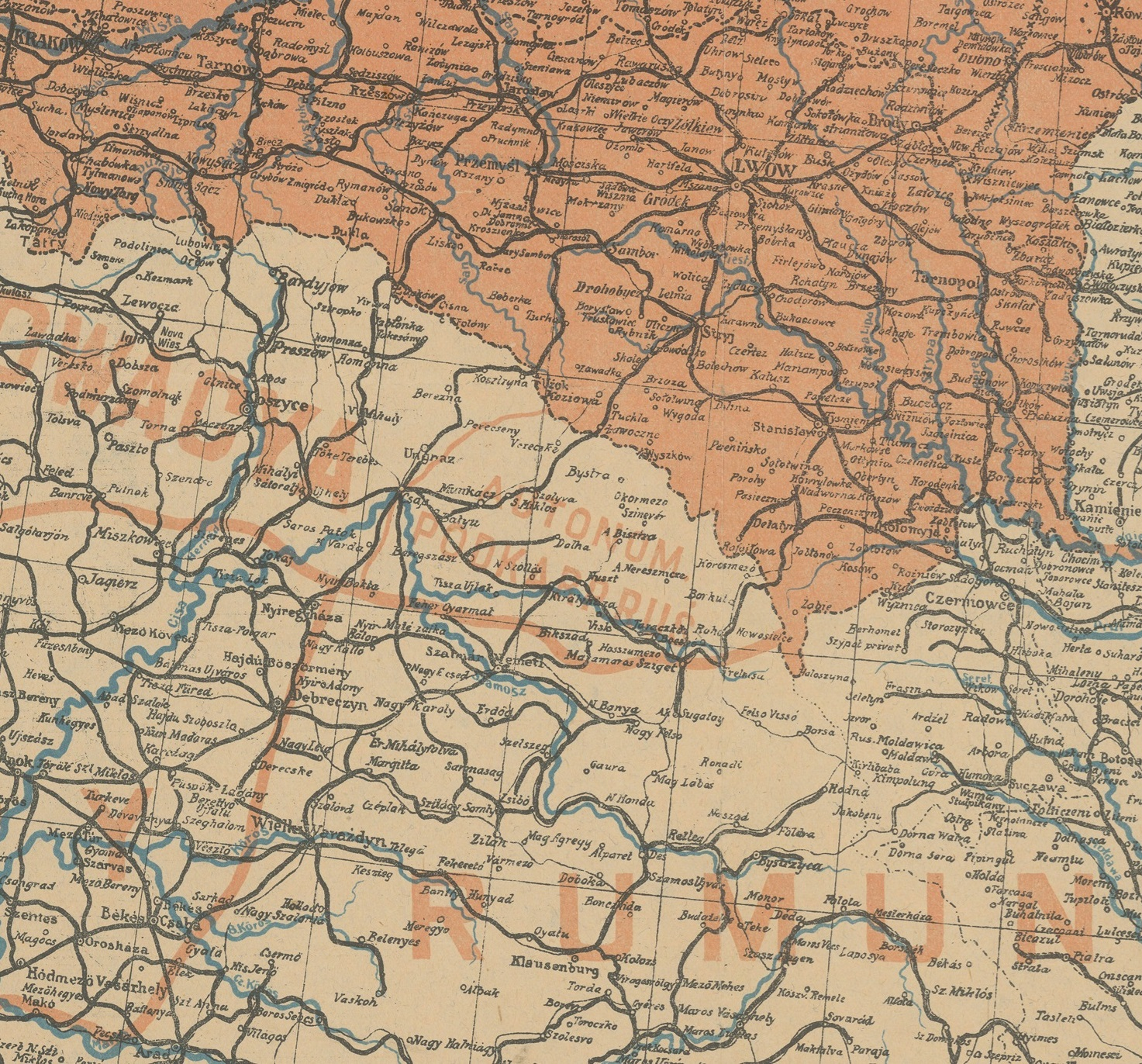
Map of Ruthenians autonomy in Czecho-Slovak state, which was promised in Treaty of Versailles in Article 81 and confirmed in Treaty of St. Germain (Jan Zabiełło 1920). Visible cities Csap (Chop), Munkacz (Mukachevo), Beregszász (Berehove), Dolhe (Dovhe), Tiszaújlak (Vylok), Királyháza (Korolevo), Huszt (Khust).

The Article 53, Treaty of St. Germain (10 September 1919) granted the Carpathian Ruthenians autonomy, which was later upheld to some extent by the Czechoslovak constitution. Some rights were, however, withheld by Prague, which justified its actions by claiming that the process was to be a gradual one; and Ruthenians representation in the national sphere was less than that hoped for. Carpathian Ruthenia included former Hungarian territories of Ung County, Bereg County, Ugocsa County and Máramaros County.

After the Paris Peace Conference, Transcarpathia was awarded to Czechoslovakia. The Allies had few alternatives: Hungary had lost the war, while Ukraine was seen as politically unviable and Russia was in the midst of a civil war. Whether this was widely popular among the mainly peasant population, is debatable; clearly, however, what mattered most to Ruthenians was not which country they would join, but that they be granted autonomy within it. After their experience of Magyarization, few Carpathian Rusyns were eager to remain under Hungarian rule, and they desired to ensure self-determination. According to the Czechoslovak Constitution of 1920, the former region of the Kingdom of Hungary, Ruthenian Land (Ruszka Krajna), was officially renamed to Subcarpathian Ruthenia (Podkarpatská Rus).

In 1920, the area was used as a conduit for arms and ammunition for the anti-Soviet Poles fighting in the Polish-Soviet War directly to the north, while local Communists sabotaged the trains and tried to help the Soviet side. During and after the war many Ukrainian nationalists in East Galicia who opposed both Polish and Soviet rule fled to Carpathian Ruthenia.

Gregory Žatkovich was appointed governor of the province by Masaryk on 20 April 1920, and resigned almost a year later, on 17 April 1921, to return to his law practice in Pittsburgh, Pennsylvania, US. The reason for his resignation was dissatisfaction with the borders with Slovakia. His tenure is a historical anomaly as the only American citizen ever acting as governor of a province that later became a part of the USSR.

=== Subcarpathian Rus (1928–1939) ===
Subcarpathian Rus Podkarpatská Rus
- Region of Czechoslovakia
- 1928–1939
- Flag of Czechoslovakia Coat of arms

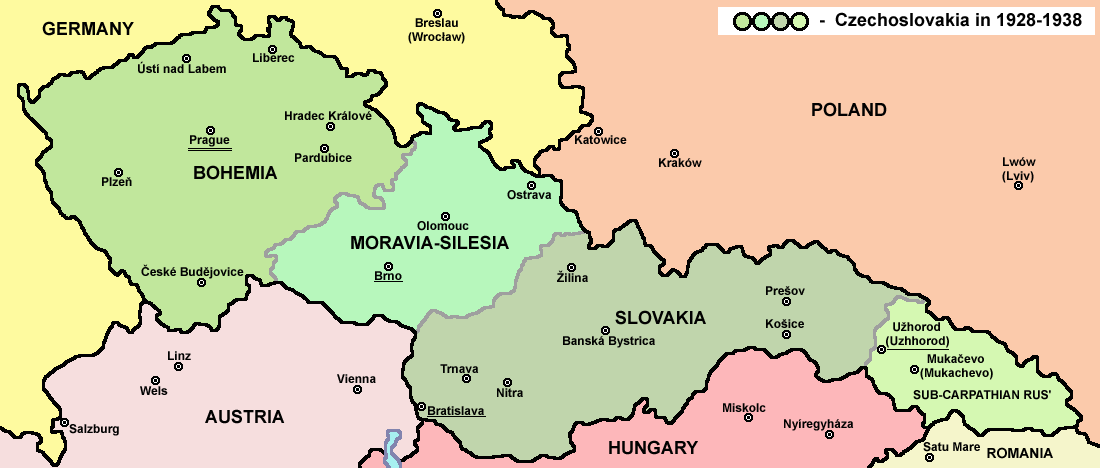
- Subcarpathian Rus' within Czechoslovakia (1928)
- Capital: Užhorod (1928–1938); Chust (1938–1939)
- Area
  - 1921: 12,097 km^{2} (4,671 sq mi)
- Population
  - 1921: 592,044
- Historical era: Interwar period
  - Region established: 1928
  - First Vienna Award: 2 November 1938
  - Autonomy: 22 November 1938
  - Name changed to Carpathian Ukraine: 30 November 1938
  - Proclamation of independence as Carpatho-Ukraine: 15 March 1939
Preceded by	Succeeded by
First Czechoslovak Republic	Carpatho-Ukraine
- Today part of: Ukraine

In 1928, Czechoslovakia was divided into four provinces: Bohemia, Moravia-Silesia, Slovakia, and the Subcarpathian Rus. The main town of the region, and its capital until 1938, was Užhorod. It had an area of 12,097 square kilometres (4,671 sq mi), and its 1921 population was estimated as being 592,044.

In the period 1918–1938 the Czechoslovak government attempted to bring the Subcarpathian Rus, with 70% of the population illiterate, no industry, and a herdsman way of life, up to the level of the rest of Czechoslovakia. Thousands of Czech teachers, policemen, clerks and businessmen went to the region. The Czechoslovak government built thousands of kilometers of railways, roads, airports, and hundreds of schools and residential buildings. The Ukrainian language was not actively persecuted in Czechoslovakia during the interwar period, unlike in Poland and Romania. 73 percent of local parents voted against Ukrainian language education for their children in a referendum conducted in Subcarpathian Rus' in 1937.

=== Carpathian Ukraine (1938–1939) ===
Carpatho-Ukraine in 1939

In November 1938, under the First Vienna Award—a result of the Munich Agreement—Czechoslovakia ceded southern Carpathian Rus to Hungary. The remainder of Subcarpathian Rus' received autonomy, with Andrej Bródy as prime minister of the autonomous government. After the resignation of the government following a local political crisis, Avhustyn Voloshyn became prime minister of the new government. In December 1938, Subcarpathian Rus' was renamed to Carpathian Ukraine.

Following the Slovak proclamation of independence on 14 March 1939, and the Nazis' seizure of the Czech lands on 15 March, Carpathian Ukraine declared its independence as the Republic of Carpatho-Ukraine, with Avhustyn Voloshyn as head of state, and was immediately occupied and annexed by Hungary, restoring provisionally the former counties of Ung, Bereg and partially Máramaros.

=== Governorate of Subcarpathia (1939–1945) ===
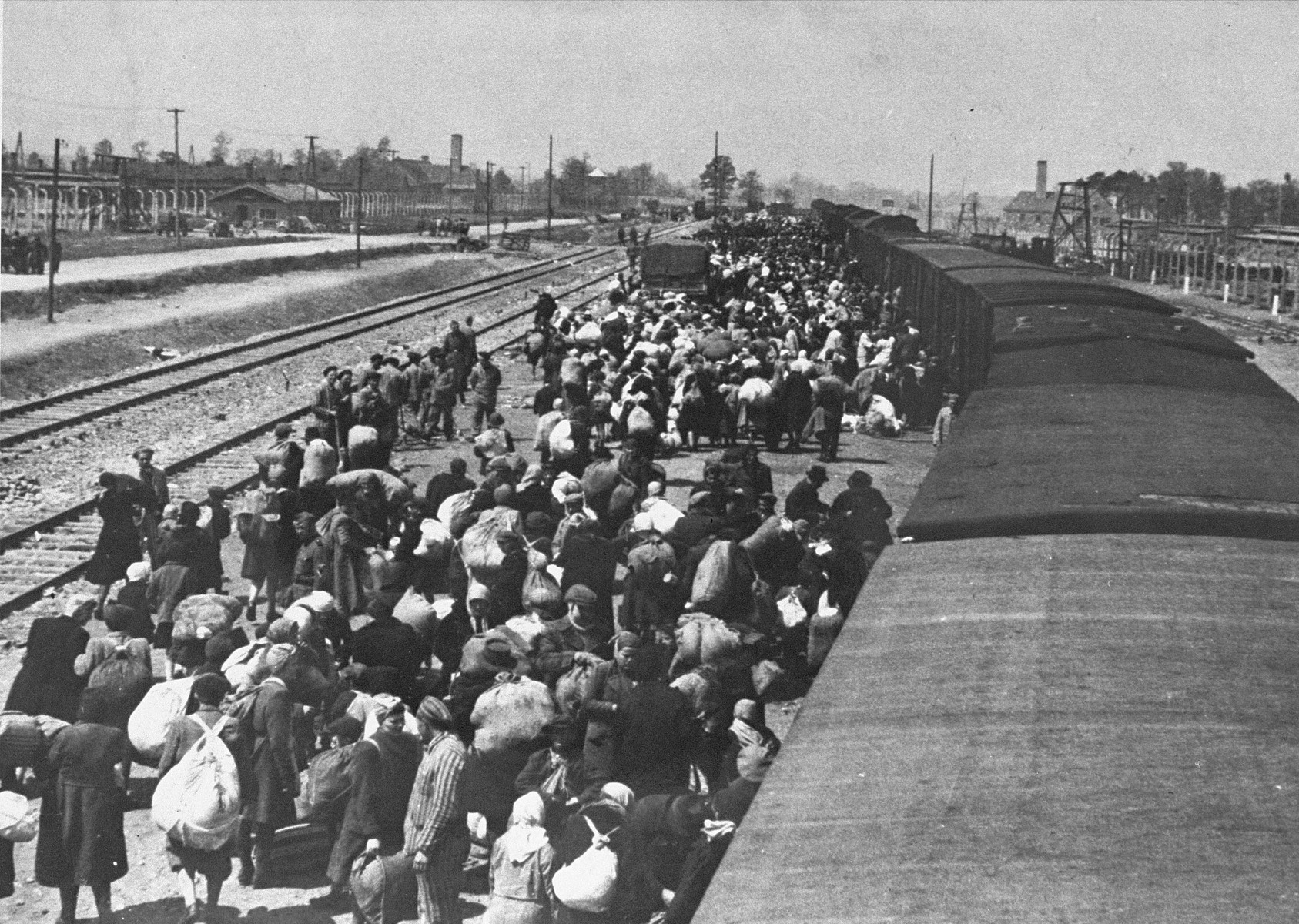
Carpathian Ruthenian Jews arrive at Auschwitz–Birkenau, May 1944. Without being registered to the camp system, most were killed in gas chambers hours after arriving.

On 23 March 1939, Hungary annexed further territories disputed with Slovakia bordering with the west of the former Carpatho-Rus. The Hungarian invasion was followed by a few weeks of terror in which more than 27,000 people were shot dead without trial and investigation. Over 75,000 Ukrainians decided to seek asylum in the Soviet Union; of those almost 60,000 of them died in Gulag prison-camps. Others joined the remaining Czech troops from the Czechoslovak army-in-exile.

Upon liquidation of Carpatho-Ukraine, in the territory annexed the Governorate of Subcarpathia was installed and divided into three, the administrative branch offices of Ung (Hungarian: Ungi közigazgatási kirendeltség), Bereg (Hungarian: Beregi közigazgatási kirendeltség) and Máramaros (Hungarian: Máramarosi közigazgatási kirendeltség) governed from Ungvár, Munkács and Huszt respectively, having Hungarian and Rusyn language as official languages.

Memoirs and historical studies provide much evidence that in the nineteenth and early twentieth centuries Rusyn-Jewish relations were generally peaceful. In 1939, census records showed that 80,000 Jews lived in the autonomous province of Ruthenia. Jews made up approximately 14% of the prewar population; however, this population was concentrated in the larger towns, especially Mukachevo, where they constituted 43% of the prewar population. After the German occupation of Hungary (19 March 1944) the pro-Nazi policies of the Hungarian government resulted in emigration and deportation of Hungarian-speaking Jews, and other groups living in the territory were decimated by war. During the Holocaust, 17 main ghettos were set up in cities in Carpathian Ruthenia, from which all Jews were taken to Auschwitz for extermination. Ruthenian ghettos were set up in May 1944 and liquidated by June 1944. Most of the Jews of Transcarpathia were killed, though a number survived, either because they were hidden by their neighbours, or were forced into labour battalions, which often guaranteed food and shelter.

The end of the war had a significant impact on the ethnic Hungarian population of the area: 10,000 fled before the arrival of Soviet forces. Many of the remaining adult men (25,000) were deported to the Soviet Union; about 30% of them died in Soviet labor camps. As a result of this development since 1938, the Hungarian and Hungarian-speaking population of Transcarpathia was recorded differently in various censuses and estimations from that time: 1930 census recorded 116,548 ethnic Hungarians, while the contested Hungarian census from 1941 shows as many as 233,840 speakers of Hungarian language in the region. Subsequent estimations are showing 66,000 ethnic Hungarians in 1946 and 139,700 in 1950, while the Soviet census from 1959 recorded 146,247 Hungarians.

=== Transition to Soviet takeover and control (1944–1945) ===
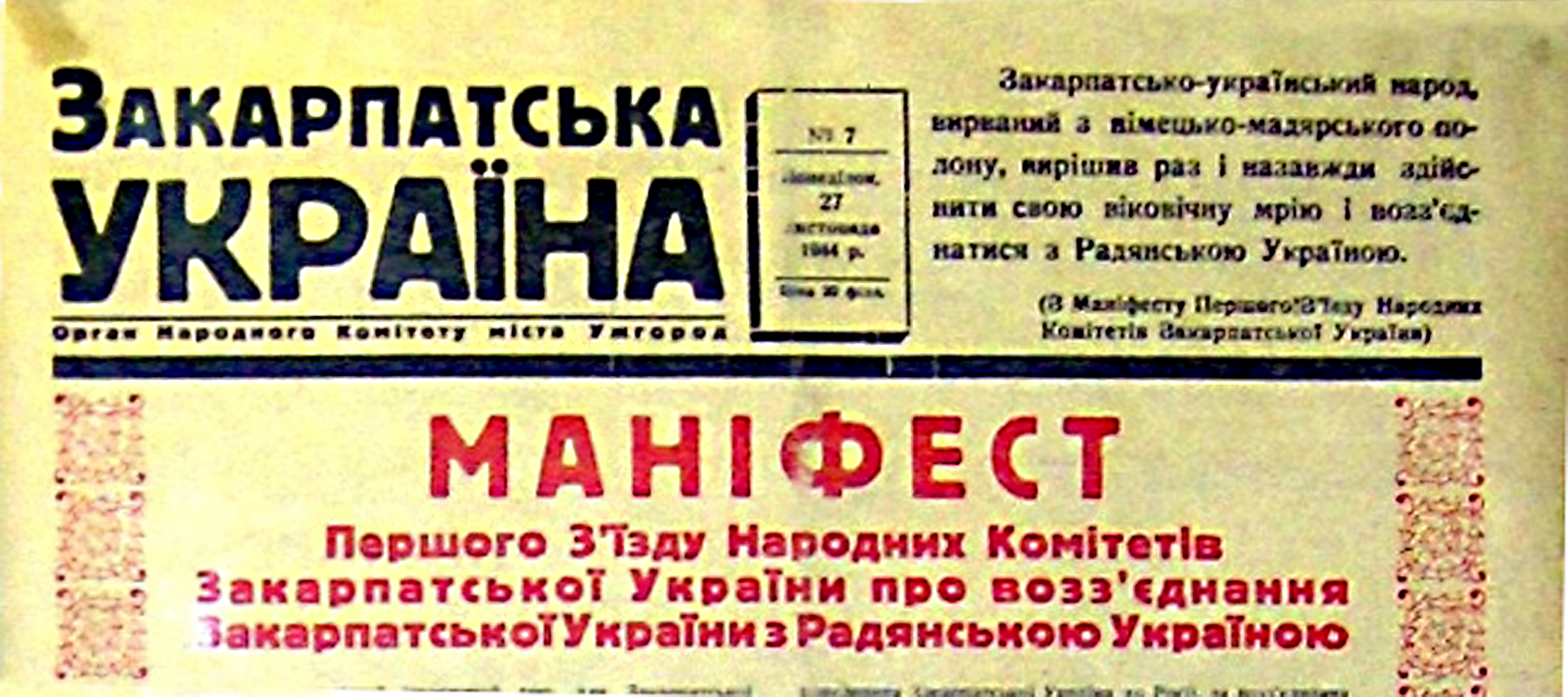
Front page of the Zakarpattia Ukraine newspaper (1944) with manifest of unification with Soviet Ukraine

The Soviet takeover of the region started with the East Carpathian Strategic Offensive in the fall of 1944. This offensive consisted of two parts: the Battle of the Dukla Pass in effort to support the Slovak National Uprising; and the Battle of Uzhgorod to break through to the Hungarian plains and encircle German troops in Transylvania. On 28 October 1944, upon conclusion of the offensive campaign, most of Subcarpathian Ruthenia was secured by the Workers-Peasants Red Army (RKKA).

The Czechoslovak government delegation led by minister František Němec arrived in Khust to establish the provisional Czechoslovak administration, according to the treaties between the Soviet and Czechoslovak governments on 8 May 1944. According to the Soviet–Czechoslovak treaty, it was agreed that once any liberated territory of Czechoslovakia ceased to be a combat zone of the Red Army, those lands would be transferred to full control of the Czechoslovak state. However, after a few weeks, the Red Army and NKVD started to obstruct the Czechoslovak delegation's work. Communications between Khust and the government center in exile in London were obstructed and the Czechoslovak officials were forced to use underground radio.

On 14 November 1944 the underground radio "Vladislav" transmitted the following message from Khust to London: "The Red Army is subjugating everything to it. We are requesting information, whether it is discussed with the government. Our situation is critical. An open campaign is ongoing for uniting Subcarpathian Ukraine with the Soviet Union. Forced recruitment to the ranks of the Red Army. People are uneducated. Awaiting your recommendations. We urgently need instructions from the government."

On 5 November 1944, in anticipation of Soviet rule, the Uzhgorod city council introduced Moscow time (2 hours ahead of Central European Time). According to Magdalena Lavrincova, this was perceived by many as a sign of the totalitarianism to come.

In November 1944, in Mukachevo, there was a meeting of representatives of Communist Party organization from local districts, who created an organization committee to call for a party conference. On 19 November 1944 at the conference in Mukachevo, the Communist Party of Zakarpattia Ukraine was established. The conference also decided to unite Carpathian Ruthenia with the Ukrainian SSR, to strengthen People's committees as organs of revolutionary authority, and to organize help for the Red Army. The conference also elected its central committee and its first secretary, Ivan Turyanytsia, and agreed to hold a congress of the People's committees on 26 November 1944.

The "National Council of Transcarpatho-Ukraine" was set up in Mukachevo under the protection of the Red Army. On 26 November this committee, led by Ivan Turyanitsa (a Rusyn who deserted from the Czechoslovak army) proclaimed the will of Ukrainian people to separate from Czechoslovakia and join Soviet Ukraine. After two months of conflicts and negotiations the Czechoslovak government delegation departed from Khust on 1 February 1945, leaving Carpathian Ukraine under Soviet control.

=== Transcarpathian Ukraine–Soviet Union (1945–1991) ===
On 29 June 1945, Czechoslovakia signed a treaty with the Soviet Union, officially ceding the region. Between 1945 and 1947, the new Soviet authorities fortified the new borders, and in July 1947 declared Transcarpathia as a "restricted zone of the highest level", with checkpoints on the mountain passes connecting the region to mainland Ukraine.

In December 1944 the National Council of Transcarpatho-Ukraine set up a special people's tribunal in Uzhgorod to try and condemn all collaborationists with the previous regimes—both Hungary and Carpatho-Ukraine. The court was allowed to hand down either 10 years of forced labour, or the death penalty. Several Ruthenian leaders, including Andrej Bródy and Shtefan Fentsyk, were condemned and executed in May 1946. Avgustyn Voloshyn also died in prison. The extent of the repression showed to many Carpatho-Ruthenian activists how it would not have been possible to find an accommodation with the coming Soviet regime as it had been with all previous ones.

After breaking the Greek Catholic Church in Eastern Galicia in 1946, Soviet authorities pushed for the return to Orthodoxy of Greek-Catholic parishes in Transcarpathia too, including by engineering an accident leading to the death of recalcitrant bishop Theodore Romzha on 1 November 1947. In January 1949 the Greek-Catholic Eparchy of Mukachevo was declared illegal; remaining priests and nuns were arrested, and church properties were nationalised and parcelled for public use or lent to the Russian Orthodox Church (Moscow Patriarchate), the only accepted religious authority in the region.

Cultural institutions were also forbidden, including the Russophile Dukhnovych Society, the Ukrainophile Prosvita, and the Subcarpathian Scholarly Society. New books and publications were circulated, including the Zakarpatsk'a Pravda (130,000 copies). The Uzhhorod National University was opened in 1945 and over 816 cinematographs were open by 1967. The Ukrainian language was the first language of instruction in schools throughout the region, followed by Russian, which was used in academia. Most new generations had a passive knowledge of Rusyn language, but no knowledge about local culture. XIX-century Rusyn intellectuals were labelled as "members of the reactionary class and instruments of Vatican obscurantism". The Rusyn anthem and hymn were banned from public performance. Carpatho-Rusyn folk culture and songs, which were promoted, were presented as part of Transcarpathian regional culture as a local variant of Ukrainian culture.

In 1924, the Comintern declared all East Slavic inhabitants of Czechoslovakia (Rusyns, Carpatho-Russians, Rusnaks) to be Ukrainians. Starting with the 1946 census, all Rusyns were recorded as Ukrainians; anyone clinging to the old label was considered a separatist and a potential counter-revolutionary.

In February 1945, the National Council confiscated 53,000 hectares of land from large landowners and redistribute it to 54,000 peasant households (37% of the population). Collectivisation of land started in 1946; around 2,000 peasants were arrested during protests in 1948–49 and sent for forced labour in the gulags. Collectivisation, including of mountain shepherds, was completed by May 1950. Central planning decisions set Transcarpatia to become a "land of orchards and vineyards" between 1955 and 1965, planting 98,000 hectares with little results. Attempt to cultivate tea and citrus also failed due to the climate. Most vineyards were uprooted twenty years later, during Gorbachev's anti-alcohol campaign in 1985–87.

The Soviet period also meant the upscaling of industrialization in Transcarpathia. State-owned lumber mills, chemical and food-processing plants widened, with Mukachevo's tobacco factory and Solotvyno's salt works as the biggest ones, providing steady employment to the residents of the region, beyond the traditional subsistence agriculture. And while traditional labour migration routes to the fields of Hungary or the factories of the United States were now closed, Carpathian Ruthens and Romanians could now move for seasonal work in Russia's North and East.

The inhabitants of the region grew steadily in the Soviet period, from 776,000 in 1946 to over 1.2 million in 1989. Uzhgorod's population increased five-fold, from 26,000 to 117,000, and Mukachevo likewise from 26,600 to 84,000. This population increase also reflected demographic changes. The arrival of the Red Army meant the departure of 5,100 Magyars and 2,500 Germans, while 15–20,000 Jewish survivors of the Holocaust also decided to move out before the borders were sealed. By 1945, around 30,000 Hungarians and Germans had been interned and sent for labour camps in Eastern Ukraine and Siberia; while amnestied in 1955, around 5,000 did not come back. In January 1946, 2,000 more Germans were deported. In return, a large number of Ukrainians and Russians moved to Transcarpathia, were they found jobs in the industry, the military, or the civilian administration. By 1989, around 170,000 Ukrainians (mainly from nearby Galizia) and 49,000 Russians were living in Transcarpatia, mainly in new residential blocks in the main towns of Uzhgorod and Mukachevo, where the dominant language had soon turned from Hungarian and Yiddish to Russian. They kept being considered newcomers (novoprybuli) due to their disconnect from the Rusyn- and Hungarian-speaking countryside.

=== Transition to independent Ukraine (1991–) ===
In July 1991 the Ukrainian SSR adopted a law about referendums that lasted until 2012. Soon after the August coup in Moscow (19–22), on 24 August 1991 the Verkhovna Rada (Ukrainian parliament) of the Ukrainian SSR proclaimed declaration about its independence and also prohibited the Communist Party in the republic. The local nomenklatura remained in confusion for several days following those events. The local People's Movement of Ukraine (Rukh) and other activists were organizing protests across the whole oblast (region). The local council of Uzhhorod city renamed the Lenin Square to People's Square. On 30 August 1991 during a protest in Uzhhorod a monument of Lenin was removed. Monuments of Lenin were also removed in other settlements; however, this decision was not universally accepted and faced resistance in some instances. In Tiachiv, a municipality which also adopted the decision to remove the monument faced resistance from local "supporters of Lenin" of Roma ethnicity who clashed with Rukh activists. Due to support of the Zakarpattia regional council of the putsch organizers in Moscow (GKChP), the local "democratic forces" were requesting for the council to announce its dissolution. Among those "democratic forces" were members of the Uzhhorod city council, deputies of "Democratic platform" in the regional council, National Movement of Ukraine, Ukrainian Republican Party, Democratic Party of Ukraine, Hungarian Cultural Federation in Transcarpathia (KMKSZ), Shevchenko Association of Ukrainian Language and the regional branch of Prosvita.

Because of the situation in the region, on 26 August 1991 the deputy chairman of the regional council Yuriy Vorobets signed an order to hold an extraordinary session of the council on 30 August, but on 29 August the head of the council Mykhailo Voloshchuk (formerly the 1st secretary of the Zakarpattia regional communist party committee) postponed it by a separate order. On 28 August 1991 the demand for the extraordinary session was supported by the Zakarpattia Democratic League of Youth that previously was part of the Komsomol of Ukraine (LKSMU). To relieve the pressure, Voloshchuk approved a composition of provisional deputy commission for inspection of activity of officials during the putsch that consisted of 17 members mostly of the recently dissolved Communist Party and couple of Rukh members (Mykhailo Tyvodar and Lyubov Karavanska). At the same time Voloshchuk was urgently seeking for other managing positions for other party officials who lost their job with recent liquidation of the party. Concurrently, the regional ispolkom (executive committee) suddenly registered 208 religious communities and transferred property ownership of 83 church buildings to them.

The government of Zakarpattia decided to bet on separatist actions. On 27 August 1991 the Mukachevo city council decided to ask the Zakarpattia regional council to adopt a decision about proclamation of the region as the "Zakarpattia autonomous land of Ukraine". In two days the Mukachevo Raion council has decided to ask the regional council to petition before the Verkhovna Rada (Ukrainian parliament) to "grant the Zakarpattia Oblast status of autonomous republic". The latter decision was supported by the Berehove Raion council, Uzhhorod city council and Svaliava Raion council. On 1 September 1991 in Mukachevo, the Association of Carpatho-Rusyns organized a picket with anti-Ukrainian slogans and accusations in "forceful Ukrainization of Rusyns". At the gathering were adopted statement with demand for autonomy and carrying out a regional referendum on the issue. On 15 September 1991 the same demand were put forward by KMKSZ. Those Rusyns questioned legality of Zakarpattia unification with the Ukrainian SSR in 1945.

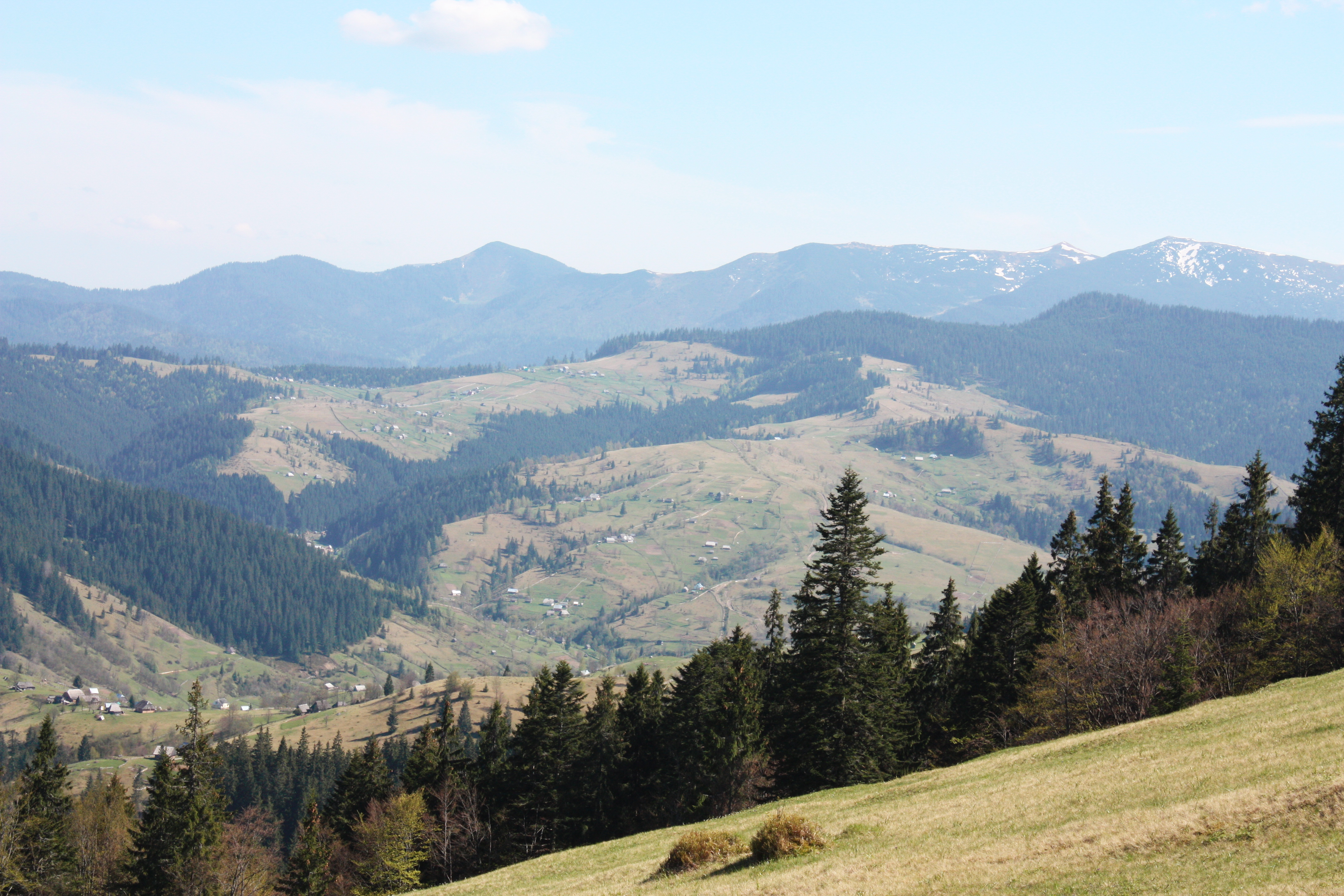
Carpathian Ruthenia in 2014

By the end of September 1991 in Zakarpattia Oblast has formed two opposing political camps. One camp pro-Ukrainian has united around the National Movement of Ukraine also included URP, DemPU, Party of Greens, Shevchenko Association of Ukrainian Language, regional branches of Prosvita, Memorial and others. The camp also supported by students of the Uzhhorod State University, several members of the Uzhhorod city council, Greek Catholic Eparchy of Mukachevo, and small faction of deputies in the regional council. The pro-Ukrainian camp was seeking to reelect the regional council. The other camp consisted of sympathizers of the regional nomenklatura officials (and formerly communist) who were supported by Association of Carpatho-Rusyns, later it was joined by KMKSZ (Association of Hungarian Culture of Zakarpattia). The latter camp also was supported by the Zakarpattia eparchy of Russian Orthodox Church, selected members of the Greek Catholic Eparchy of Mukachevo as well as by the majority of the regional council. The camp was aimed to prevent reelection of the regional council and obtain autonomous status for the region.

On 27 September 1991 it was finally announced about the extraordinary session of the regional council. The leadership of the council planned to end its work the same day, but the session stretched until 31 October 1991 and the center of political life in Zakarpattia Oblast had relocated to the regional council and the People's Square in front of the council's building.

In December 1991 Zakarpattia became a part of independent Ukraine. A majority 92.59% of voters of Zakarpattia oblast approved the Declaration of Independence of Ukraine. On the same day in Zakarpattia Oblast a regional referendum also took place. 78 percent of voters voted for autonomy within Ukraine, which was not granted.

On 27 January 2024 Hungarian László Toroczkai said at a conference that his party Mi Hazánk Mozgalom would lay claim to Transcarpathia if the Ukraine-Russia war led to Ukraine losing its statehood.

== Demographics ==
=== Ethnic groups ===
Census	Ruthenians, Ukrainians and Rusyns	"Czechoslovaks" (Czechs and Slovaks)	Germans	Hungarians	Jews	Romanians	Others	Total population
1880	244,742 (59.8%)	8,611 (2.1%)	31,745 (7.8%)	105,343 (25.8%)	(not a census option)	16,713 (4.1%)	1,817 (0.4%)	408,971 (100%)
1921	372,884 (63.0%)	19,737 (3.3%)	10,460 (1.8%)	102,144 (17.3%)	80,059 (13.5%)	(with "others")	6,760 (1.1%)	592,044 (100%)
1930	450,925 (62.2%)	34,511 (4.8%)	13,804 (1.9%)	115,805 (16.0%)	95,008 (13.1%)	12,777 (1.8%)	2,527 (0.4%)	725,357 (100%)
1959	686,464 (74.6%)	Slovaks; 12,289 (1.3%); Czechs; 964 (0.1%)	3,504 (0.4%)	146,247 (15.9%)	12,169 (1.3%)	18,346 (2%)	Russians; 29,599 (3.2%)	920,173 (100%)
1970	808,131 (76.5%)	Slovaks; 9,573 (0.9%); Czechs; 721 (0.1%)	4,230 (0.4%)	151,949 (14.4%)	10,856 (1%)	23,454 (2.2%)	Russians; 35,189 (3.3%)	1,056,799 (100%)
1979	898,606 (77.8%)	Slovaks; 8,245 (0.7%); Czechs; 669 (0.1%)	3,746 (0.3%)	158,446 (13.7%)	3,848 (0.3%)	27,155 (2.3%)	Russians; 41,713 (3.6%)	1,155,759 (100%)
1989	976,749 (78.4%)	Slovaks; 7,329 (0.6%)	3,478 (0.3%)	155,711 (12.5%)	2,639 (0.2%)	29,485 (2.4%)	Russians; 49,456 (4.0%); Romani (1.0%)	1,245,618 (100%)
2001	Ukrainians; 1,010,100 (80.5%); Rusyns; 10,100 (0.8%)	Slovaks; 5,600 (0.5%)	3,500 (0.3%)	151,500 (12.1%)	no data	32,100 (2.6%)	Russians; 31,000 (2.5%); Roma; 14,000 (1.1%); Others (0.4%)	(100%)

=== Religion ===
Religion in Zakarpattia Oblast (2015)
1. Eastern Orthodoxy (68.0%)
2. Eastern Catholicism (19.0%)
3. Roman Catholicism (7.00%)
4. Unaffiliated Christian (3.00%)
5. Protestantism (1.00%)
6. No religion (1.00%)
7. Undecided (1.00%)

According to a 2015 survey, 68% of the population of Zakarpattia Oblast adheres to Eastern Orthodoxy, while 19% are followers of the Ruthenian Greek Catholic Church and 7% are Roman Catholics. Protestants and unaffiliated generic Christians make up 1% and 3% of the population respectively. Only one percent of the population does not follow any religion.

The Orthodox community of Zakarpattia is divided as follows:

- Ukrainian Orthodox Church – Kyiv Patriarchate – 42%
- Ukrainian Orthodox Church of the Moscow Patriarchate – 33%
- Non-denominational – 25%

=== Issue with self-identity: Ukrainians or Rusyns ===
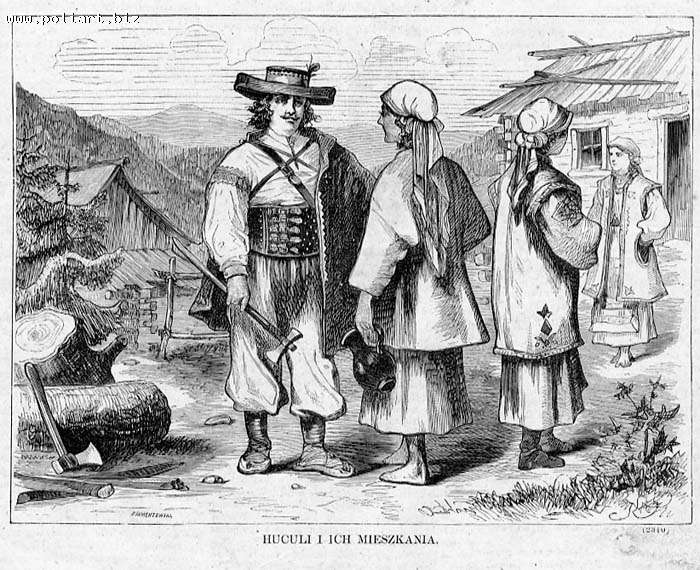
Hutsuls and their habitations, Carpathian Mountains, c. 1872

Carpathian Ruthenia is inhabited mainly by people who self-identify as Ukrainians, many of whom may refer to themselves as Rusyns, Rusnak or Lemko. Places inhabited by Rusyns also span adjacent regions of the Carpathian Mountains, including regions of present-day Poland, Slovakia, Hungary, and Romania. Ruthenian settlements exist in the Balkans as well.

In the 19th century and the first part of the 20th, the inhabitants of Transcarpathia continued to call themselves "Ruthenians" ("Rusyny"). After Soviet annexation the ethnonym "Ukrainian", which had replaced "Ruthenian" in eastern Ukraine at the turn of the century, was also applied to Ruthenians/Rusyns of Transcarpathia. Most present-day inhabitants consider themselves ethnically Ukrainians, although in the most recent census 10,100 people (0.8% of Zakarpattia Oblast's 1.26 million) identified themselves as ethnically Rusyn.

=== Hungarians ===
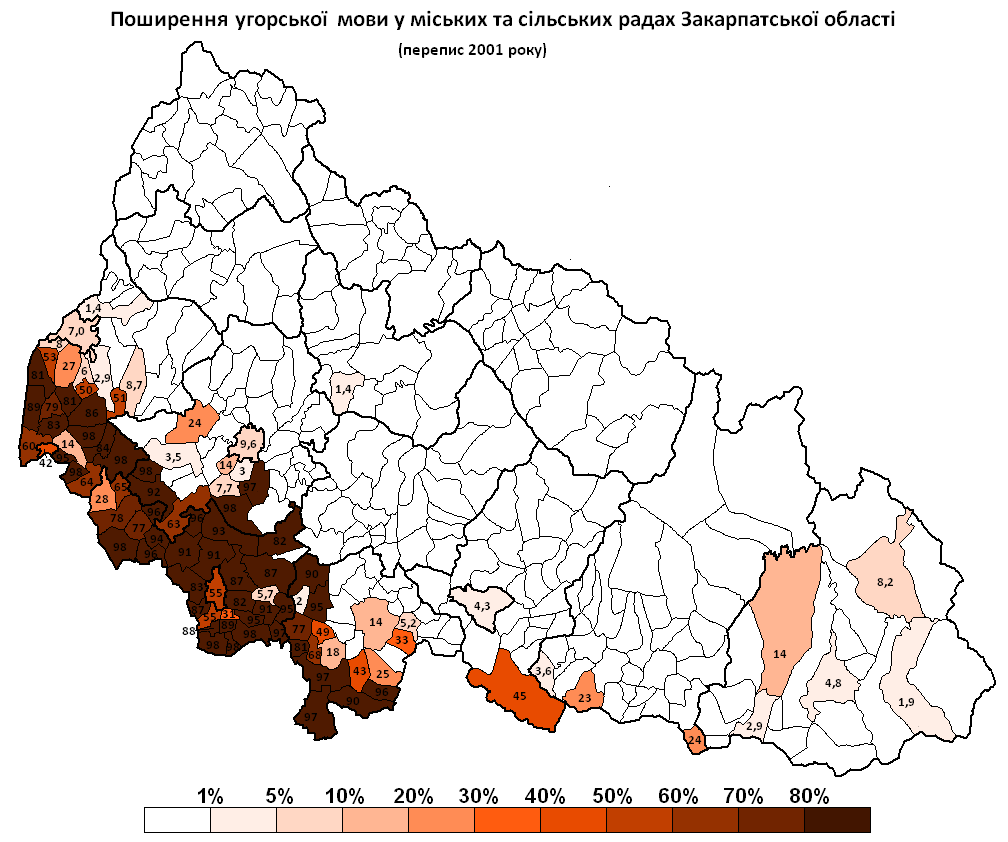
Percentage of Hungarian native speakers in Zakarpattia oblast according to 2001 census

The following data is according to the Ukrainian census of 2001.

The 1910 Austro-Hungarian census showed 185,433 speakers of the Hungarian language, while the Czechoslovak census of 1921 showed 111,052 ethnic Hungarians and 80,132 ethnic Jews, many of whom were speakers of the Hungarian language. Much of the difference in these censuses reflects differences in methodology and definitions rather than a decline in the region's ethnic Hungarian (Magyar) or Hungarian-speaking population. According to the 1921 census, Hungarians constituted about 17.9% of the region's total population.

The end of World War II had a significant impact on the ethnic Hungarian population of the area: 10,000 fled before the arrival of Soviet forces. Many of the remaining adult men (25,000) were deported to the Soviet Union; about 30% of them died in Soviet labor camps. As a result of this development since 1938, the Hungarian and Hungarian-speaking population of Transcarpathia was recorded differently in various censuses and estimations from that time: 1930 census recorded 116,548 ethnic Hungarians, while the contested Hungarian census from 1941 shows as much as 233,840 speakers of Hungarian language in the region. Subsequent estimations are showing 66,000 ethnic Hungarians in 1946 and 139,700 in 1950, while the Soviet census from 1959 recorded 146,247 Hungarians.

As of 2004, about 170,000 (12–13%) inhabitants of Transcarpathia declare Hungarian as their mother tongue. Homeland Hungarians refer to Hungarians in Ukraine as kárpátaljaiak.

=== Jews ===
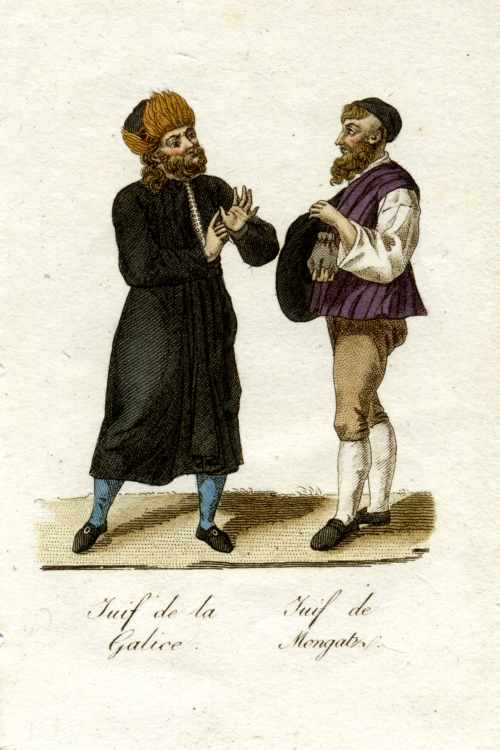
Jews from Galicia (left) and Mukachevo (right), 1821

Memoirs and historical studies provide much evidence that in the nineteenth and early twentieth centuries Rusyn-Jewish relations were generally peaceful. In 1939, census records showed that 80,000 Jews lived in the autonomous province of Ruthenia. Jews made up approximately 14% of the prewar population; however, this population was concentrated in the larger towns, especially Mukachevo, where they constituted 43% of the prewar population. Most of them perished during the Holocaust.

=== Germans ===
See Carpathian Germans for more information (mainly Germans from Bohemia, Moravia and the territories from present-day central and eastern Germany) about their settlement in the 16th to 18th centuries.

=== Czechs ===
Czechs in Carpathian Ruthenia are ethnoculturally distinct from other West Slavic groups like the Slovaks, as they originated from Czech-speaking groups from Bohemia and Moravia instead of Slovakia.

=== Romani ===
There are approximately 25,000 ethnic Romani in present-day Transcarpathia. Some estimates point to a number as high as 50,000 but a true count is hard to obtain as many Roma cannot afford ID documents for themselves and their children. Additionally, many Romani will claim to be Hungarian or Romanian when interviewed by Ukrainian authorities.

They are by far the poorest and least-represented ethnic group in the region and face intense prejudice. The years since the fall of the Soviet Union have not been kind to the Romani of the region, as they have been particularly hard hit by the economic problems faced by peoples all over the former USSR. Some Romani in western Ukraine live in major cities such as Uzhhorod and Mukachevo, but most live in ghettos on the outskirts of cities. These ghettos are known as "taberi" and can house up to 300 families. These encampments tend to be fairly primitive with no running water or electricity.

=== Romanians ===
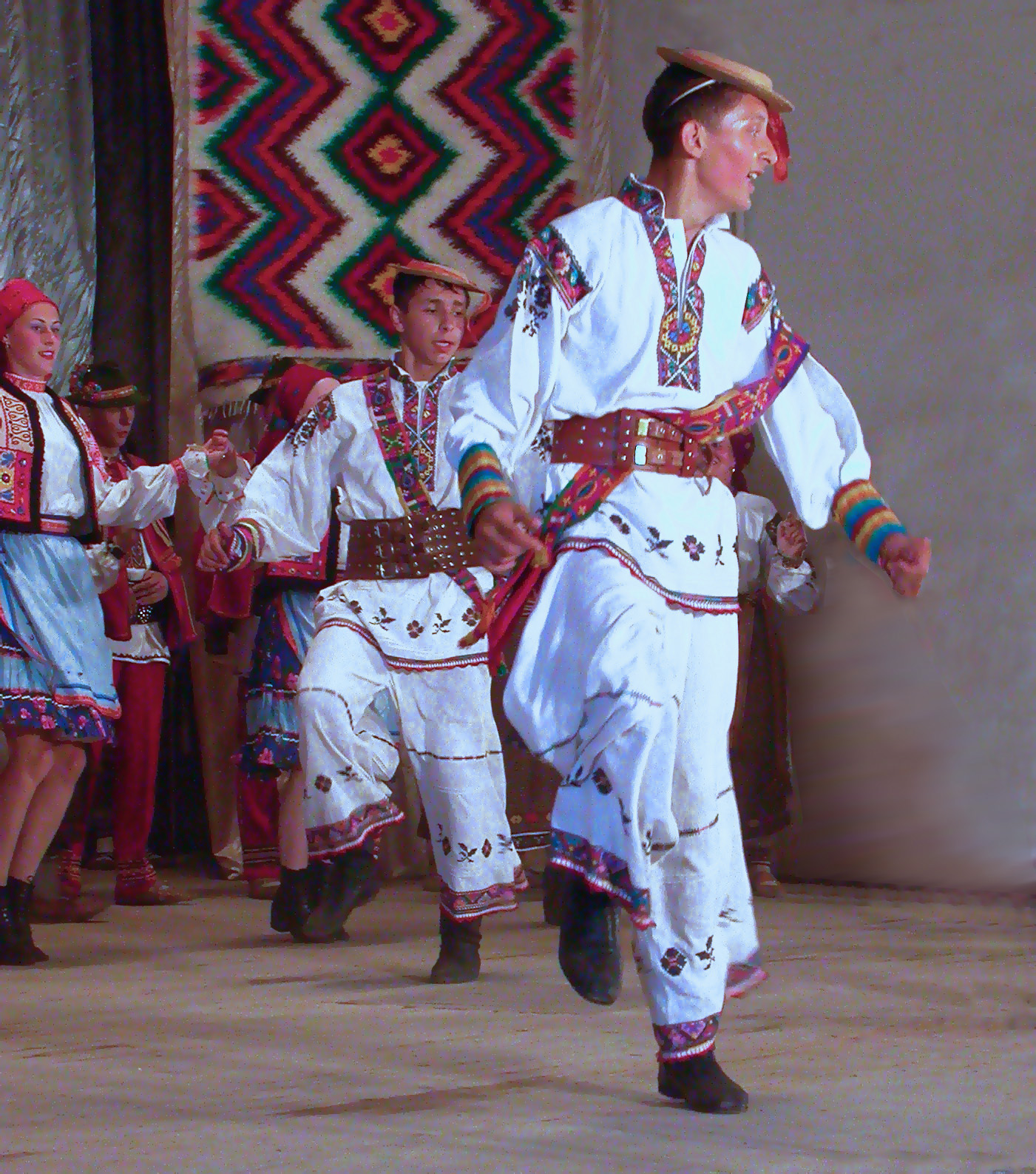
Stylized traditional folk costume of Romanians of Zakarpattia

Today some 30,000 Romanians live in this region, mostly in northern Maramureș, around the southern towns of Rahău/Rakhiv and Teceu Mare/Tiachiv and close to the border with Romania. However, there also are Romanians in Carpathian Ruthenia living outside Maramureș, mostly in the village of Poroshkovo. They are usually called volohi in Romanian and live closer to Poland and Slovakia than Romania.

=== Greeks ===
There are a few Greeks in Carpathian Ruthenia. They are also known as Carpatho-Greeks and Greek-Carpathians.

== Transcarpathian influence on Ruritania ==
For 19th-century west-European readers, Ruthenia was an inspiration for "Ruritania", a rustic province lost in forested mountains. Conceived as a Central European kingdom, Ruritania was the setting for several of Anthony Hope's novels, including The Prisoner of Zenda (1894).

A century later Vesna Goldsworthy, in Inventing Ruritania: the Imperialism of the Imagination (1998), theorizes on ideas underpinning western views of Europe's "Wild East", especially Ruthenia and some Slavic Balkan areas. She sees these ideas as highly applicable to Transcarpathia and describes "an innocent process: a cultural great power seizes and exploits the resources of an area, while imposing new frontiers on its mind-map and creating ideas which, reflected back, have the ability to reshape reality."

== See also ==
- Black Ruthenia
- Red Ruthenia
- White Ruthenia
- Military history of Carpathian Ruthenia during World War II
- Ruthenians and Ukrainians in Czechoslovakia (1918–1938)
- Eparchy of Mukačevo and Prešov
- Alexander Dukhnovych
- Avgustyn Voloshyn
- Ukrainian dialects
- Kárpátalja football team
- Magyaron

== Sources ==
- Baerlein, Henri (1938). In Czechoslovakia's Hinterland, Hutchinson. ASIN B00085K1BA
- Boysak, Basil (1963). The Fate of the Holy Union in Carpatho-Ukraine, Toronto-New York.
- (in Russian) Fentsik, Stefan A. (1935). Greetings from the Old Country to all of the American Russian people! (Pozdravlenije iz staroho Kraja vsemu Amerikanskomu Karpatorusskomu Narodu!). ASIN B0008C9LY6
- Nemec, Frantisek, and Vladimir Moudry (2nd ed., 1980). The Soviet Seizure of Subcarpathian Ruthenia, Hyperion Press. ISBN 0830500855
- (in German) Ganzer, Christian (2001). Die Karpato-Ukraine 1938/39: Spielball im internationalen Interessenkonflikt am Vorabend des Zweiten Weltkrieges. Hamburg (Die Ostreihe – Neue Folge, Heft 12).
- (in German) Kotowski, Albert S. (2001). "Ukrainisches Piemont"? Die Karpartenukraine am Vorabend des Zweiten Weltkrieges, in Jahrbücher für Geschichte Osteuropas 49, Heft 1. S. 67–95.
- Krofta, Kamil (1934). Carpathian Ruthenia and the Czechoslovak Republic. ASIN B0007JY0OG
- Magocsi, Paul R. (1973). "An Historiographical Guide to Subcarpathian Rus'" (PDF). Austrian History Yearbook. 9: 201–265. doi:10.1017/S006723780001910X. S2CID 144778333. Archived from the original (PDF) on 5 December 2019.
- Magocsi, Paul R. (1975). "The Ruthenian Decision to Unite with Czechoslovakia" (PDF). Slavic Review. 34 (2): 360–381. doi:10.2307/2495193. JSTOR 2495193. S2CID 155615547. Archived from the original (PDF) on 28 April 2019.
- Magocsi, Paul R. (1978). The Shaping of a National Identity: Subcarpathian Rus', 1848–1948. Cambridge: Harvard University Press. ISBN 978-0674805798.
- Magocsi, Paul R. (1983). Galicia: A Historical Survey and Bibliographic Guide. Toronto: University of Toronto Press. ISBN 978-0802024824.
- Magocsi, Paul R. (1988). Carpatho-Rusyn Studies: An Annotated Bibliography. Vol. 1. New York: Garland. ISBN 978-0824012144.
- Magocsi, Paul R. The Rusyn-Ukrainians Of Czechoslovakia Archived 19 October 2006 at the Wayback Machine
- Magocsi, Paul R. – Pop, Ivan. Encyclopedia of Rusyn history and culture, Univ. of Toronto Press, 2005. ISBN 0802035663
- (in Czech) Pop, Ivan. Dějiny Podkarpatské Rusi v datech. Libri, Praha 2005. ISBN 8072772376
- (in Ukrainian) Rosokha, Stepan (1949). Parliament of Carpatho-Ukraine (Coйм Карпатськoї України), Ukrainian National Publishing Co., Ltd. for Culture and Knowledge (Культура й ocвiтa).
- Shandor, Vincent (1997). Carpatho-Ukraine in the Twentieth Century: A Political and Legal History. Cambridge, Massachusetts: Harvard University Press for the Harvard Ukrainian Research Institute. ISBN 0916458865.
- Stercho, Peter (1959). Carpatho-Ukraine in International Affairs: 1938–1939, Notre Dame.
- Subtelny, Orest (3rd ed., 2000). Ukraine: A History, University of Toronto Press ISBN 0802083900
- Wilson, Andrew (2nd ed., 2002). The Ukrainians: Unexpected Nation, Yale University Press. ISBN 0300093098.
- Winch, Michael (1973). Republic for a day: An eye-witness account of the Carpatho-Ukraine incident, University Microfilms. ASIN B0006W7NUW
- Nykolaj Beskyd. "Who Was Aleksander Duchnovyc?" Narodny Novynky. Prešov, Slovakia. No. 17. 28 April 1993. Translated by John E. Timo.
- Paul Robert Magocsi (1995) The Carpatho-Rusyns.
- "Nation Building or Nation Destroying? Lemkos, Poles and Ukrainians in Contemporary Poland." Polish Review. XXXV 3/4. New York 1990.
- John Slivka. The History of the Greek Rite Gatholics in Pannonia, Hungary, Czechoslovakia and Podkarpatska Rus 863–1949. 1974.
- Ivan Panjkevic (1938) Українськi Говори Пiдкарпатської Руси i Сумeжних Областeй: Prague.
- Aleksej L. Petrov (1998) Medieval Carpathian Rus, New York.
