= Béla (given name) =

Béla (Hungarian: [ˈbeːlɒ]; Slavic variants are Bela or Belo) is a common Hungarian male given name. Its most likely etymology is from old Hungarian bél ("heart; insides" in Old Hungarian and "intestines" in modern Hungarian; in both the symbolism is "guts" i.e. bravery and character). Another possible source is a Turkic word boila/boyla – "noble, distinguished" (which was a title of high nobility among the Bulgars and Göktürks), or a variant of Ábel.

Due to the fame and importance of Saint Adalbert of Prague (~956–997) for early mediaeval Hungarian, Czech and Polish cultural history, the name Béla has been artificially assigned to the Germanic name Adalbert ("noble bright") and the Slavonic name Vojtěch/Wojciech ("consolator of troops"), although there is no linguistic relationship among these names.

== People ==
- Béla of Hungary
  - Béla I of Hungary (1020–1063), King of Hungary
  - Béla II of Hungary (1109–1141), King of Hungary and Croatia
  - Béla III of Hungary (1148–1196), King of Hungary and Croatia
  - Béla IV of Hungary (1206–1270), King of Hungary and Croatia
- Béla of Macsó (1243–1272), Duke of Macsó and Bosnia
- Bela of Saint Omer (died 1258), French knight, Lord of one half of Thebes
- Bela of Britonia (fl. 675), Galician clergyman, Bishop of Britonia
- Béla Nagy Abodi (1918–2012), Hungarian painter
- Béla Apáti Abkarovics (1888–1957), Hungarian painter and graphic artist
- Béla Bacsó (disambiguation)
  - Béla Bacsó (1891–1920) Hungarian journalist and writer
  - Béla Bacsó (1952) aesthete
- Béla Bácskai (1912–1994), Hungarian field hockey player
- Béla Bakosi (born 1957), Hungarian triple jumper
- Béla Balázs (1884–1949), Hungarian film critic, writer and poet
- Béla Balogh (1885–1945), Hungarian film director
- Béla Balogh (born 1984), Hungarian footballer
- Béla Bánáthy (disambiguation)
  - Béla H. Bánáthy (1919–2003), American linguist and systems scientist
  - Béla A. Bánáthy (born 1943), American systems scientist
- Béla Bánhidy (1836–1890), Hungarian politician
- Béla Barabás (1855–1934), Hungarian politician, jurist and author
- Béla Barényi (1907–1997), Hungarian-Austrian engineer
- Béla Bartalos (born 1948), Hungarian handball player
- Béla Bartók (1881–1945), Hungarian composer and pianist
- Béla Bay (1907–1999), Hungarian fencer
- Béla Békessy (1875–1916), Hungarian fencer
- Béla Belicza, Hungarian sprint canoer
- Béla Berger (1931–2005), Hungarian-Australian chess player
- Béla Bicsérdy (1872–1951), Hungarian alternative medicine advocate, lecturer and author
- Béla Biszku (1921–2016), Hungarian politician
- Béla Bodó (born 1959), Hungarian hurdler
- Béla Bodonyi (born 1956), Hungarian footballer
- Béla Bollobás (born 1943), Hungarian-British mathematician
- Bela Borsodi, Austrian photographer
- Béla Bugár (born 1958), Slovak politician
- Bela Čikoš Sesija (1864–1931), Croatian painter
- Béla Csécsei (1952–2012), Hungarian educator and politician
- Béla Czóbel (1883–1976), Hungarian painter
- Béla Dankó (born 1969), Hungarian politician
- Béla Drahos (born 1955), Hungarian conductor and flautist
- Béla Egresi (1922–1999), Hungarian footballer
- Béla Ernyey (born 1942), Hungarian actor
- Béla Fleck (born 1958), American banjo player
- Béla Gaál (1893–1945), Hungarian film director
- Béla Glattfelder (born 1967), Hungarian politician
- Béla Goldoványi (1925–1972), Hungarian sprinter
- Béla Grunberger (1903–2005), French psychologist
- Béla Guttmann (1899–1981), Hungarian footballer and coach
- Béla Gyarmati (born 1942), Hungarian fencer
- Béla Hamvas (1897–1968), Hungarian writer, philosopher, and social critic
- Béla Háray (1915–1988), Hungarian ice hockey and field hockey player
- Béla Hatvany (born 1938), American computer scientist, inventor and entrepreneur
- Bela S. Huntington (1858–1934), American lawyer and politician
- Béla Illés (1895–1974), Hungarian writer and journalist
- Béla Illés (born 1968), Hungarian footballer
- Béla Imrédy (1891–1946), Hungarian politician
- Béla Ivády (1873–1962), Hungarian politician
- Béla Iványi-Grünwald (1867–1940), Hungarian painter
- Béla Jankovich (1865–1939), Hungarian politician
- Béla Tibor Jeszenszky (1962–2008), Hungarian singer
- Béla Juhász (1921–2002), Hungarian long-distance runner
- Béla Julesz (1928–2003), Hungarian neuroscientist
- Béla Jurcsek (1893–1945), Hungarian politician
- Béla Kádár (1877–1956), Hungarian painter
- Béla Károlyi (1942-2024), Romanian gymnastics coach
- Béla Kárpáti (1929–2003), Hungarian footballer
- Béla Kathi (1979–2025), Hungarian weightlifter
- Béla Katona (born 1944), Hungarian politician
- Béla Katzirz (born 1953), Hungarian footballer
- Béla von Kehrling (1891–1937), Hungarian tennis, table tennis, football and ice-hockey player and bobsledder
- Béla Kéler (1820–1882), Hungarian composer and conductor
- Béla Kerékjártó (1898–1946), Hungarian mathematician
- Béla Király (1912–2009), Hungarian military officer, politician and historian
- Béla Kiss (1877–?), Hungarian serial killer
- Béla Komjádi (1892–1933), Hungarian water polo player and coach
- Béla Kondor (1931–1972), Hungarian artist and author
- Béla Kontuly (1904–1983), Hungarian painter and art teacher
- Béla Köpeczi (1921–2010), Hungarian cultural historian and politician
- Béla Koplárovics (born 1981), Hungarian footballer
- Béla Kovács (disambiguation)
  - Béla Kovács (1910–1980), Hungarian politician and jurist
  - Béla Kovács (1908–1959), Hungarian politician
  - Béla Kovács (1937–2021), Hungarian clarinetist
  - Béla Kovács (born 1960), Hungarian politician
  - Béla Kovács (born 1977), Hungarian footballer
- Béla Kuharszki (1940–2016), Hungarian footballer
- Béla Kun (1886–1937?), Hungarian politician
- Béla Lajta (1873–1920), Hungarian architect
- Béla Lakatos (born 1984), Hungarian footballer
- Béla Linder (1876–1962), Hungarian military officer and politician
- Béla Lugosi (1882–1956), Hungarian-American actor
- Bela Lugosi, Jr. (born 1938), American lawyer
- Béla Macourek (1889–?), Hungarian flying ace
- Béla Magyari (1949–2018), Hungarian military officer and aerospace engineer
- Béla Markó (born 1951), Romanian politician
- Béla Mavrák (born 1966), Hungarian tenor singer
- Béla Mező (1883–1954), Hungarian sprinter and long jumper
- Béla Mezőssy (1870–1939), Hungarian politician
- Béla Mikla (1921–?), Hungarian fencer
- Béla Miklós (1890–1948), Hungarian military officer and politician
- Béla Molnar (1951-2020), American educator
- Bela De Nagy (1893–1945), American fencer
- Béla Orczy (1822–1917), Hungarian politician
- Béla Ormos (1899–1945), Hungarian actor
- Béla Pálfi (1923–1995), Serbian footballer
- Béla Pállik (1845–1908), Hungarian artist, opera singer and theater director
- Bela Papp (born 1994), Finnish figure skater
- Béla Pásztor (born 1938), Hungarian politician
- Béla Perczel (1819–1888), Hungarian politician and jurist
- Béla Perényi (1953–1988), Hungarian chess master
- Béla Petrovics, Hungarian sprint canoer
- Bela Pratt (1867–1917), American sculptor
- Béla Rajki (1909–2000), Hungarian swimming and water polo coach
- Béla Rerrich (1917–2005), Hungarian fencer
- Béla Réthy (born 1956), German sports reporter
- Béla Sárosi (1919–1993), Hungarian football player and manager
- Béla Schwalm (1941–2008), Hungarian ice hockey player
- Béla Scitovszky (1878–1959), Hungarian politician
- Béla Sebestyén (1885–1959), Hungarian footballer
- Bela Šefer (fl. 1924), Yugoslav footballer
- Béla Serényi (1866–1919), Hungarian politician
- Béla Síki (1923–2020), Hungarian pianist
- Béla Simon (born 1988), Hungarian rower
- Béla Spányi (1852–1914), Hungarian painter
- Béla Szabados (disambiguation)
  - Béla Szabados (1867–1936), Hungarian composer
  - Béla Szabados (born 1974), Hungarian Olympic swimmer
- Béla Szántó (1881–1951), Hungarian politician
- Béla Szászy (1865–1931), Hungarian politician and jurist
- Béla Székely (1889–1939), Hungarian politician
- Béla Szekeres (disambiguation)
  - Béla Szekeres (born 1933), Hungarian cyclist
  - Béla Szekeres (1938–2000), Hungarian runner
- Béla Székula (1881–1966), Hungarian philatelist and forger
- Béla Szende (1823–1882), Hungarian politician
- Béla Szepes (1903–1986), Hungarian skier, athlete, graphic designer and journalist
- Béla Szőkefalvi-Nagy (1913–1998), Hungarian mathematician
- Béla Szombati (born 1955), Hungarian diplomat
- Béla Takács (born 1974), Hungarian footballer
- Béla Tallián (1851–1921), Hungarian politician
- Béla Tarr (1955–2026), Hungarian film director
- Béla Tomka (born 1962), Hungarian historian
- Béla Turi-Kovács (1935–2023), Hungarian politician
- Béla Vágó (1881–1939), Hungarian politician
- Béla Várady (1953–2014), Hungarian footballer
- Béla Varga (disambiguation)
  - Béla Varga (1888–1969), Hungarian wrestler
  - Béla Varga (1903–1995), Hungarian politician and priest
- Béla Virág (born 1976), Hungarian footballer
- Béla Volentik (1907–1990), Hungarian football player and manager
- Béla Vörösmarty (1844–1904), Hungarian jurist and politician
- Béla Wenckheim (1811–1879), Hungarian politician
- Bela Zaboly (1910–1985), American cartoonist
- Béla Zoltán (1865–1929), Hungarian politician and jurist
- Béla Zsedényi (1894–1955), Hungarian jurist and politician
- Béla Zsitkovszky (1867–1930), Hungarian cinematographer and film director
- Béla Zsitnik (1924–2019), Hungarian rower
- Béla Zsolt (1895–1949), Hungarian author
- Béla Zulawszky (1869–1914), Hungarian fencer

== See also ==
- Běla, female given name of Czech origin
- Adalbert
- Vojtěch
