= Piroska Hévizi =

- Born: 1911; Kolozsvár, Austria-Hungary (now Cluj-Napoca, Romania)
- Died: 1994 (aged 82–83)

Piroska Hévizi (1911–1994) was a Hungarian Jewish painter, photographer, fashion designer, and Holocaust survivor. Born in Kolozsvár (now Cluj-Napoca, Romania), she built an early career as a successful portrait photographer before moving into painting and design. A survivor of the Bergen-Belsen concentration camp, she later created a deeply personal series of expressionist artworks based on her wartime experiences, culminating in the 1986 exhibition Mementó in Budapest. Her work is held in the collection of the Hungarian Jewish Museum and Archives in Budapest.

== Early life and education ==
Hévizi was born in 1911 into a Transylvanian Jewish family in Kolozsvár, Austria-Hungary (now Cluj-Napoca, Romania). She trained as a photographer and operated a prestigious portrait studio in her hometown for eight years, photographing notable public figures including actors, politicians, and artists. Seeking further artistic expression, she moved to Budapest to study painting at the free schools of Tibor Gallé, Béla Iványi Grünwald, and Péter Szüle. She also studied fashion design and became a designer for the Fenyves Department Store. During this period, she participated in fashion shows in Paris and traveled for study tours in Italy, Transylvania, Poland, Czechoslovakia, and the United States.

== Holocaust and postwar work ==
Hévizi’s career was interrupted by World War II. She was deported to the Bergen-Belsen concentration camp, where she remained until liberation on 15 April 1945. After the war, she traveled throughout Hungary visiting factories and teaching art to young people. During the rebuilding of the Széchenyi Chain Bridge in Budapest, she overcame a fear of heights to photograph bridge workers up close. In a 1983 interview, she described feeling compelled to capture the "living history" of the postwar city, stating:

“The stones of the ruined city, the bent backs of the workers, their tireless hands, and the enthusiastic work of hungry laborers all came under my pen and ink... I roamed the streets all day. I drew everything in sight.”

Although she survived Bergen-Belsen, Hévizi did not begin producing Holocaust-themed artwork until nearly 40 years later. In her 70s, she wrote:

"I am increasingly determined... that I must return to the world of the concentration camps once more, and after forty years, I must paint about it again in an artistically clear way... it is important to remember the horrors, and in doing so, strengthen the millions fighting for peace."

Between 1983 and 1986, she created a series of expressionist paintings confronting her memories of Bergen-Belsen. These works, marked by simplified forms and vivid color, were described as reminiscent of children's drawings—emotionally direct but visually stylized.

In October 1985, an exhibition titled Mementó, featuring Piroska Hévizi’s Holocaust-themed works, was held in a school gallery in Dunaújváros, an industrial city in Hungary. The exhibition, likely organized by local educators, included paintings such as Éhség (Hunger), A barakk (The Barrack), and A kivégzés (The Execution). The show was publicly recommended in the local newspaper by Gábor Ö. Pogány, then director of the Hungarian National Gallery, underscoring its cultural and educational significance despite the political constraints of the time.

== Legacy ==
Her painting Éhség from the Mementó series is part of the permanent collection of the Hungarian Jewish Museum and Archives. Art historian Gábor Ö. Pogány noted that the power of Hévizi’s work “lies not in the realistic closeness of 'epic horror', but in the means of artistic expression.” Her late works stand as an important postwar attempt to artistically confront trauma through a personal visual language.
