= Balatonlelle =

Town in Southern Transdanubia, Hungary

Balatonlelle Boglárlelle (1979–1991, together with Balatonboglár)
- Town
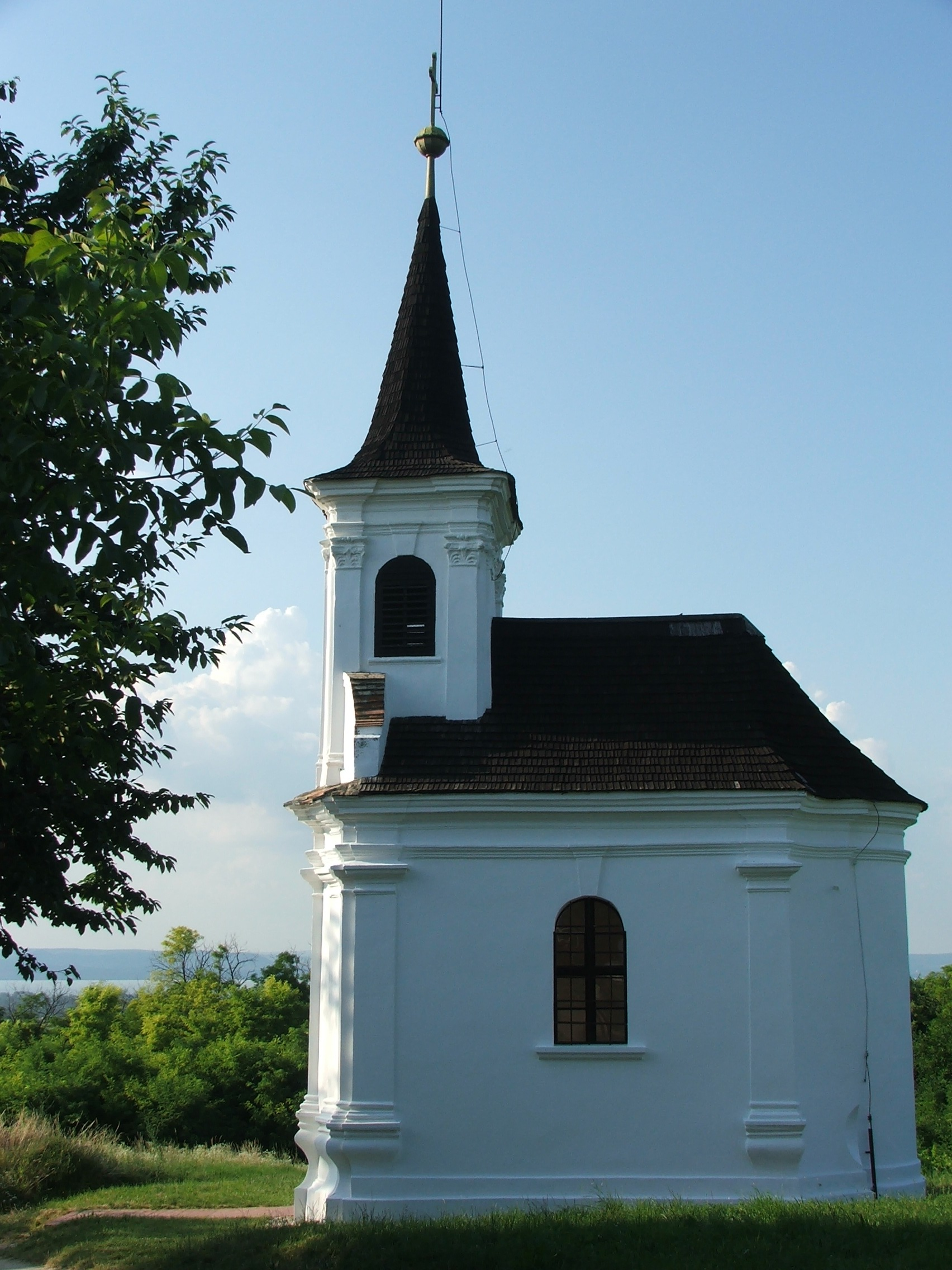
- St. Donatus Chapel, Kishegy, Balatonlelle

- Flag Coat of arms

- Location of Somogy county in Hungary

- Location of Balatonlelle
- Coordinates: 46.78225°N 17.67566°E
- Country: Hungary
- Region: Southern Transdanubia
- County: Somogy
- District: Fonyód
- RC Diocese: Kaposvár

Area
  - Total: 43.23 km^{2} (16.69 sq mi)

Population (2023)
  - Total: 5,018
  - Density: 116.1/km^{2} (300.6/sq mi)
- Demonyms: lellei, balatonlellei
- Time zone: UTC+1 (CET)
  - Summer (DST): UTC+2 (CEST)
- Postal code: 8638
- Area code: (+36) 85
- Patron Saint: Holy Trinity
- Motorways: M7
- Distance from Budapest: 140 km (87 mi) Northeast
- NUTS 3 code: HU232
- MP: József Attila Móring (KDNP)
- Website: Balatonlelle Online

Balatonlelle is a resort town located in Hungary on the southern shore of Lake Balaton, about 35 km west of Siófok. During the summer, the town becomes a holiday destination for many Hungarian and German families, and is known for its tourist attractions, including a 3 km long beach, an aqua park, a go-cart course, an annual wine festival, and numerous bars and restaurants. It is accessible from Budapest by train, taking approximately 2.5 hours.

Since the settlement forms part of the Balatonboglár wine region, a wine festival is often held in the first week of August.

== History ==
In 1211, the area around Balatonlelle came under the jurisdiction of the Tihany Abbey. The first written mention of a settlement here from a 1229 letter, referring to the village as "Lela". In 1550, the town fell under Turkish control. Its population fell dramatically under Turkish occupation, and Turkish tax documents only record 8 families living here by 1580.

In the 18th century, the land was controlled by Hungarian noble families; first the Majthényi family, and later the Szalay family. The town's first school was opened in the 1720s, however, notes from a 1778 canonical visitation reveal that this first school burned down not long after it was built.

In 1848, the town was elevated to market town status, and in 1864 it gained its current name of "Balatonlelle". In 1895, a two-classroom schoolhouse was constructed, and during the short-lived 1919 Hungarian Soviet Republic, a third room was added to the school. A public elementary school was built in the town between 1941 and 1942.

Between 1979 and 1991 Balatonlelle formed a single settlement together with Balatonboglár under the name Boglárlelle.

== Demographics ==
As of 2023, the town's total population was 5018. As of the 2022 national census, the town was 87.3% Hungarian, 2.1% German, and 2.1% of non-European origin. The population was 38.9% Roman Catholic, and 5.8% Reformed.

== Sport ==
- Balatonlelle SE, association football team

== Gallery ==
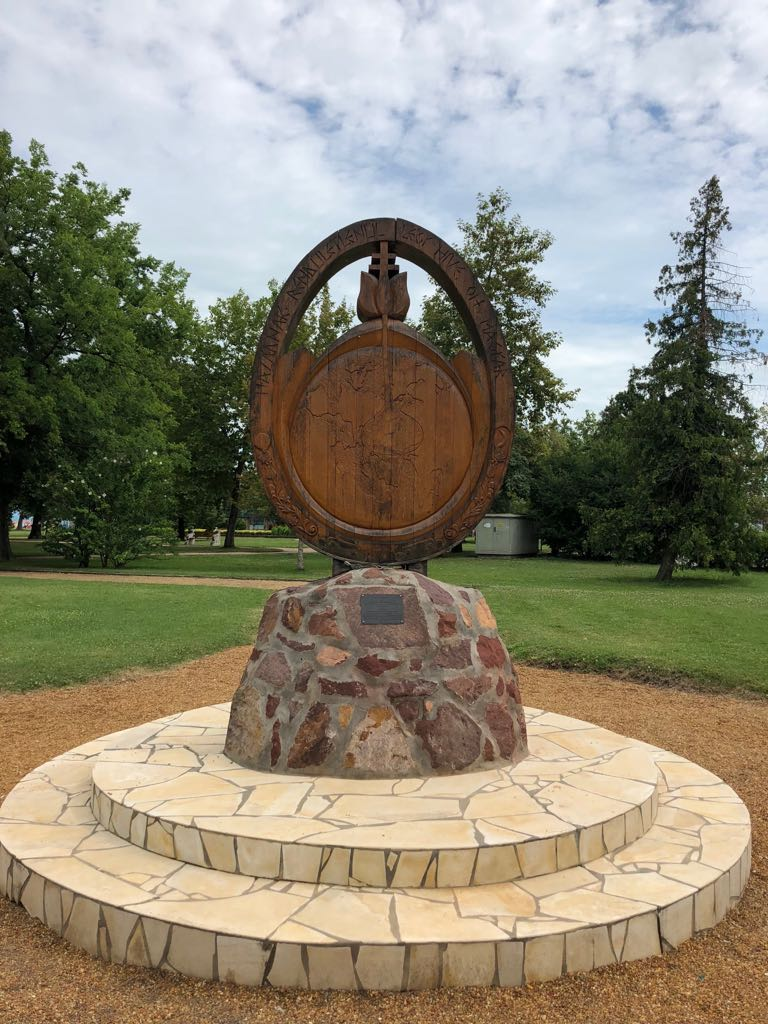
Wooden sculpture

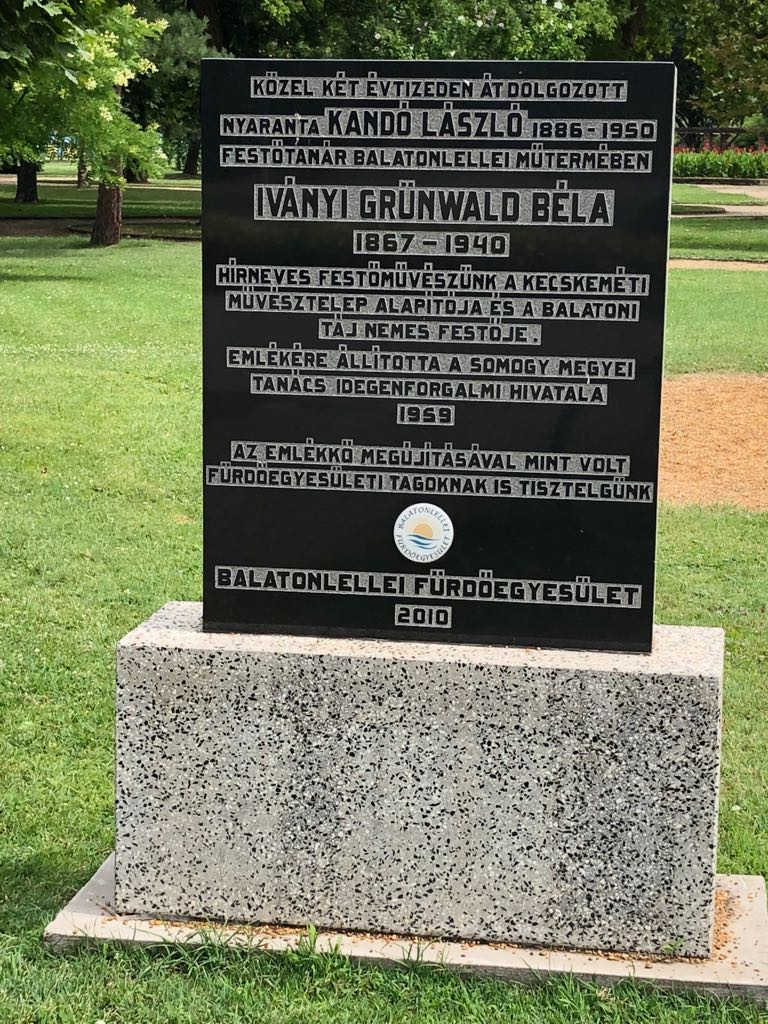
Plaque of Béla Iványi-Grünwald

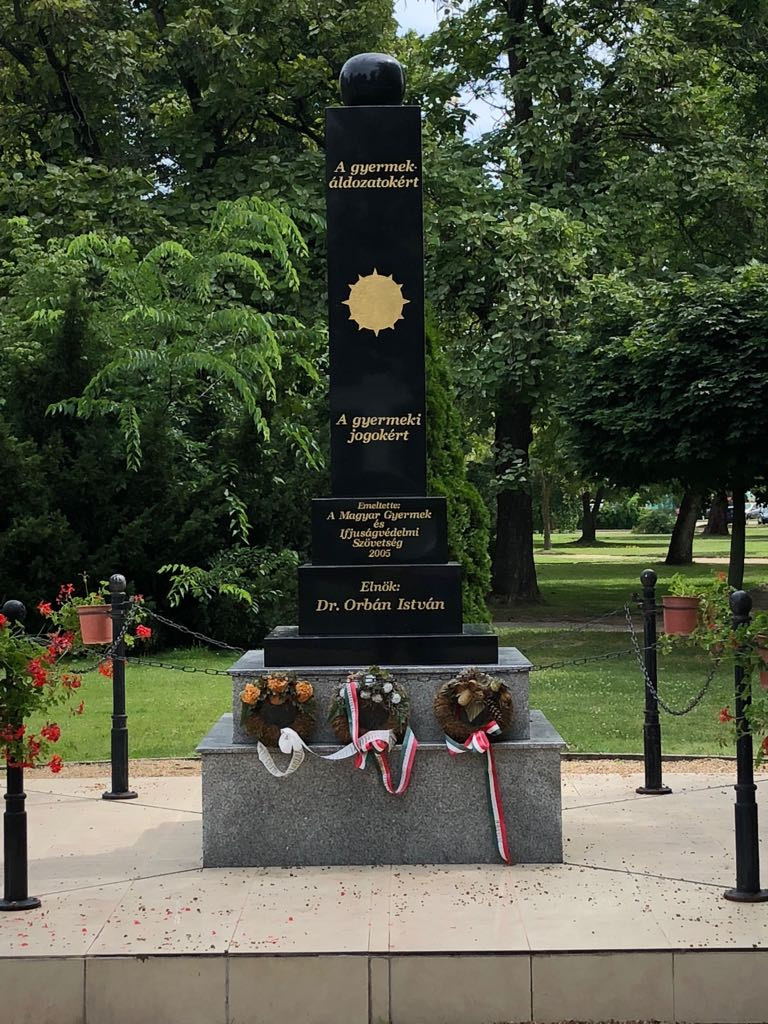
Obelisk for the rights of children

== Twin towns – sister cities ==
Balatonlelle is twinned with:

- Vlăhița, Romania
- Ramstein-Miesenbach, Germany
- Loučná nad Desnou, Czech Republic
