= Gyarmati =

Gyarmati is a Hungarian surname. Notable people with the surname include:

- Andrea Gyarmati (born 1954), Hungarian swimmer
- Anna Gyarmati (born 1993), Hungarian snowboarder
- Béla Gyarmati (born 1942), Hungarian fencer
- Dezső Gyarmati (1927–2013), Hungarian water polo player
- János Gyarmati (1910–1974), Hungarian footballer and manager
- Olga Gyarmati (1924–2013), Hungarian athlete
