= Boglárlelle =

Coordinates: 46°47′N 17°42′E

- Town
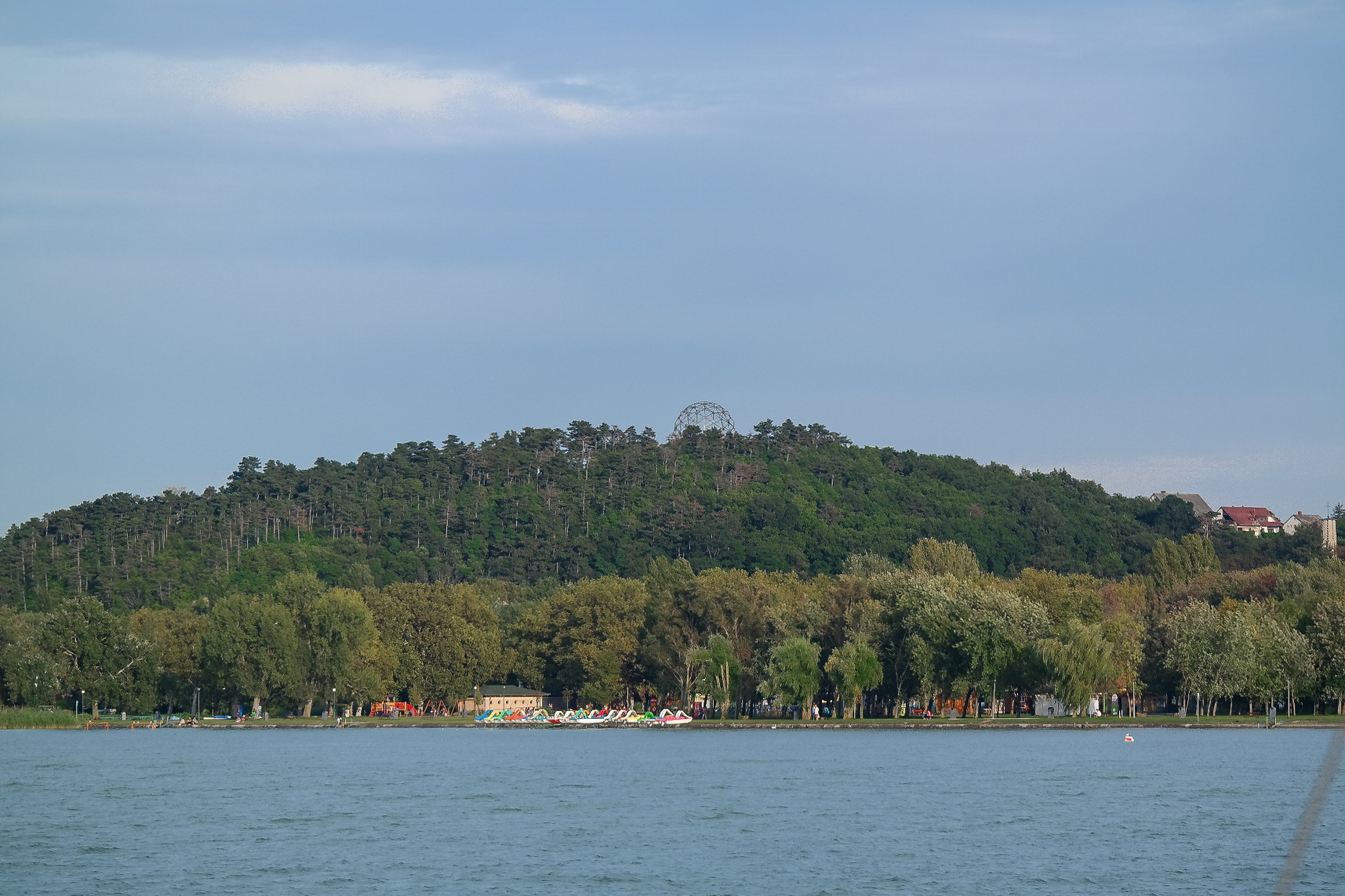
- Skyline of Balatonboglár

- Location within Hungary
- Country: Hungary
- Region: Southern Transdanubia
- County: Somogy
- District: Fonyód
- RC Diocese: Kaposvár
- Demonym: boglárlellei
- Time zone: UTC+1 (CET)
  - Summer (DST): UTC+2 (CEST)
- Area code: (+36) 85
- Motorways: M7
- Distance from Budapest: 140 km (87 mi) Northeast

Boglárlelle was a resort town in Somogy County, Hungary, on the south shore of Lake Balaton. It was created on December 31, 1978, by merging the villages of Balatonboglár and Balatonlelle. On January 1, 1984, it was elevated to "village with town status" (a special status for villages that did not meet the requirement for town status but were appointed to be centers of their districts). On January 1, 1986, it was finally granted town status, and merged with the nearby village Szőlőskislak.

In 1991 Balatonboglár and Balatonlelle became independent again, and both were granted town status. Szőlőskislak remained a part of Balatonboglár.

== Sources ==
- History of Boglárlelle (Hungarian)
