= Tomka =

Tomka may refer to:

- Béla Tomka (b. 1962), Hungarian historian
- István Tomka, musician
- Peter Tomka (b. 1956), Slovak diplomat
- An alternate spelling of Tom kha kai, a soup in Lao and Thai cuisine.
- Tomka gas test site, German chemical weapons facility in Soviet Union (1928-1931)
- Tomka River, a river in Novosibirsk Oblast, Russia
