= Béla Mezőssy =

Hungarian politician (1870–1939)

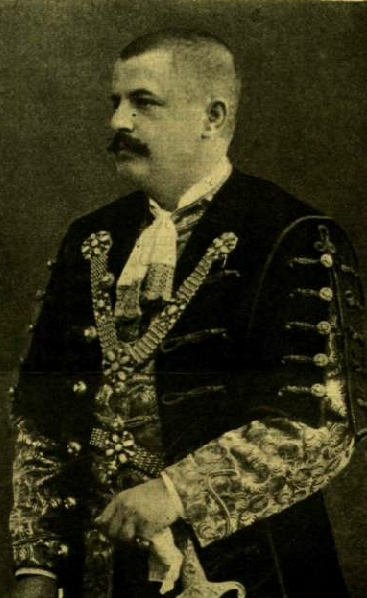

Minister of Agriculture of Hungary
- In office 15 June 1917 – 25 January 1918
- Prime Minister: Móric Esterházy; Sándor Wekerle
- Preceded by: Imre Ghillány
- Succeeded by: Sándor Wekerle

Personal details
- Born: 13 November 1870 Tolcsva, Kingdom of Hungary, Austria-Hungary
- Died: 19 January 1939 (aged 68) Újfehértó, Kingdom of Hungary
- Party: Independence Party of 48, Independence Party of 48 (Kossuth Party)
- Profession: politician

Béla Mezőssy (13 November 1870 – 19 January 1939) was a Hungarian politician, who served as Secretary of Agriculture from 1906 to 1910 and Minister of Agriculture between 1917 and his retirement in 1918.

Political offices
Preceded by Imre Ghillány	Minister of Agriculture; 1917–1918	Succeeded by Sándor Wekerle
