= Imre Ghillány =

Hungarian politician (1860–1922)

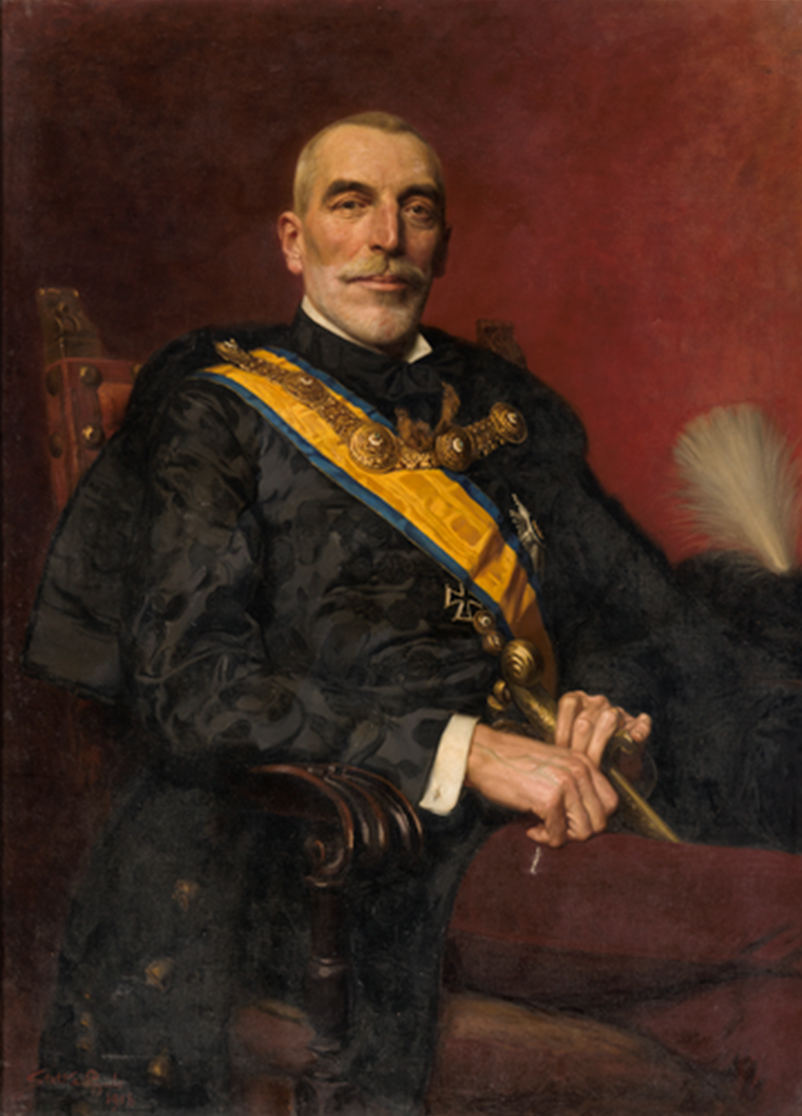

Minister of Agriculture of Hungary
- In office 10 June 1913 – 15 June 1917
- Prime Minister: István Tisza
- Preceded by: Béla Serényi
- Succeeded by: Béla Mezőssy

Personal details
- Born: 28 July 1860 Frics, Kingdom of Hungary, Austrian Empire
- Died: 23 September 1922 (aged 62) Sashalom puszta (now: part of Hatvan), Kingdom of Hungary
- Party: Party of National Work, Unity Party
- Profession: politician

Baron Imre Ghillány (28 July 1860 – 23 September 1922) was a Hungarian politician, who served as Minister of Agriculture between 1913 and 1917. He was the főispán of Sáros County from 1903 until his resignation in 1905. He became a member of the Diet of Hungary in 1910 as representative of Eperjes. Ghillány was one of the deputy chairmen of the Party of National Work. During the Regency he was one of the first politicians who joined to the Unity Party, which founded by István Bethlen. He was a member of the House of Magnates until his death.

Political offices
| Preceded by Béla Serényi | Minister of Agriculture; 1913–1917 | Succeeded by Béla Mezőssy |
