= Church of Saint Anne, Budapest =

Church in Buda, Budapest, Hungary

Coordinates: 47.5058°N 19.0383°E

Church of St. Anne
- Parish Church of St. Anne
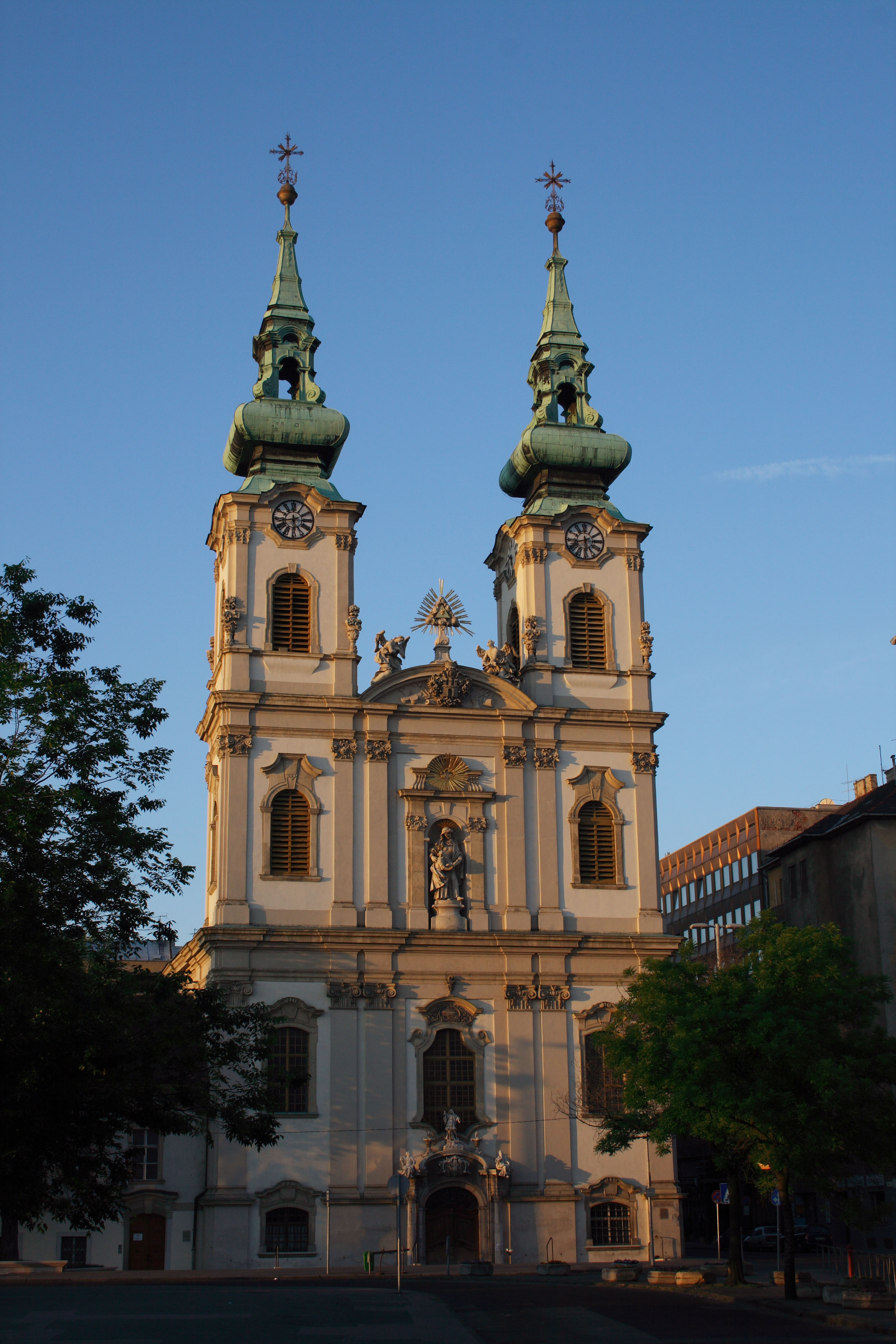
- The church of St. Anne
- Church of St. Anne
- Location: Budapest
- Country: Hungary
- Denomination: Roman Catholic

History
- Founded: 1740
- Dedicated: Saint Anne
- Consecrated: 4 August 1805

Architecture
- Style: Baroque
- Years built: 1740–1762

Administration
- Diocese: Esztergom-Budapest
- Parish: St. Anne

The Church of St. Anne is a Roman Catholic Church located in Buda, Budapest, Hungary, located on Batthyány Square. The church was built between 1740 and 1762 following a baroque style. The church has served as parish church for the parish of St. Anne.

== History ==
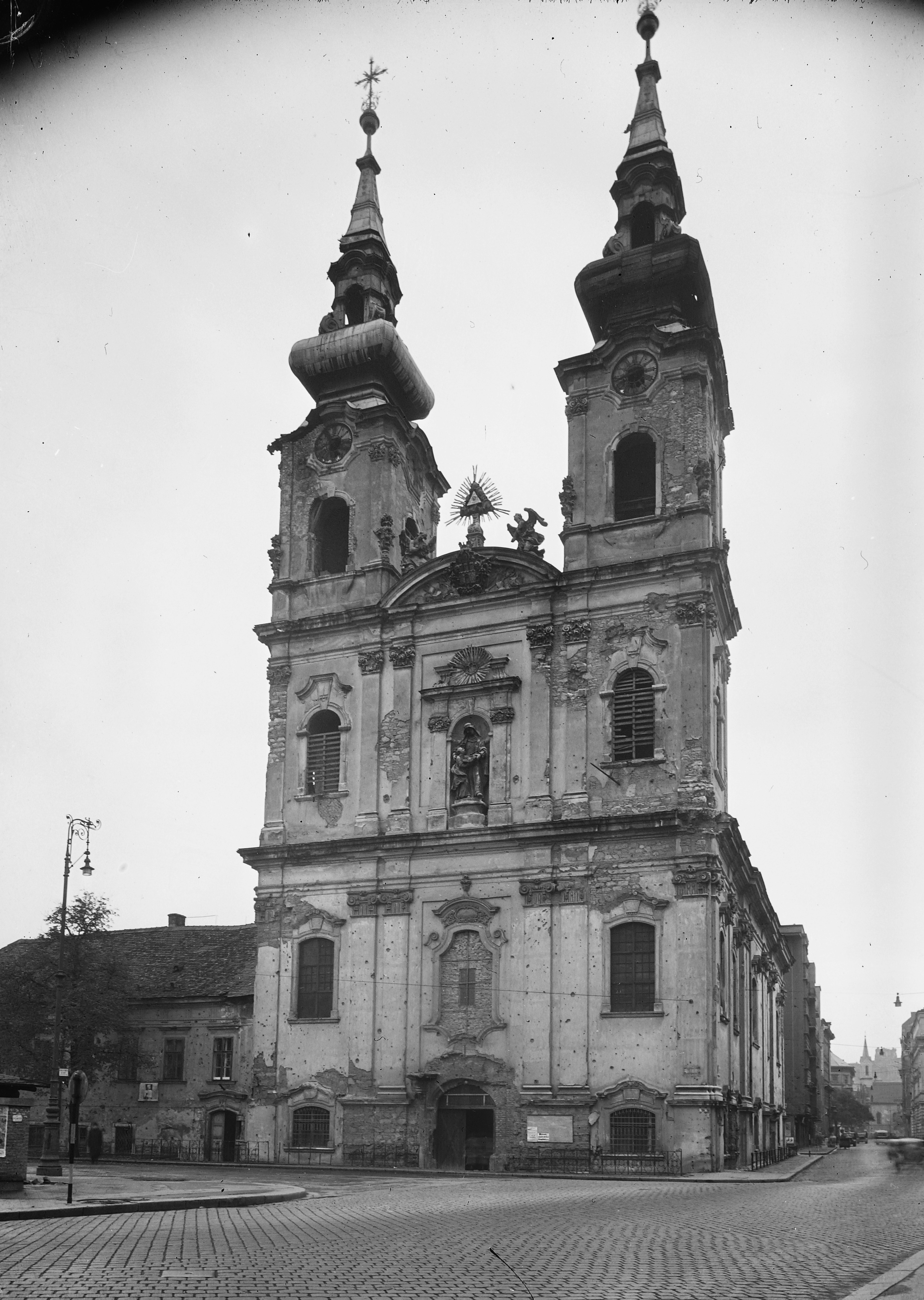
The church in 1952, before its renovations

Construction began in 1740 and concluded in 1762. The building was designed by Kristóf Hamon and Máté Nepauer. By 1746 the majority of the church was completed and thus it opened for worshippers. The church was constructed following an increase in the population of the area, replacing an earlier structure located not far from the current one. Following an earthquake in 1763, the church was partially rebuilt by Ádám Kögl SJ and János Hamon (the latter was the son of Kristóf Hamon). It was consecrated on 4 August 1805.The church suffered repeated damage due to flooding, earthquake, and wars, and by the 1950s, the church was in such poor condition that authorities had planned to destroy the building so that new buildings could be constructed, including a metro station stop. The building suffered decades of neglect and structural problems, but in 1954 a plan to save the church was approved and in 1970 restorations began. Restorations lasted for 14 years, ending in 1984. Another set of renovations were conducted between 1992 and 1997. The restorations stabilised the building and restored it to its original appearance.

== Architecture ==
=== Exterior ===
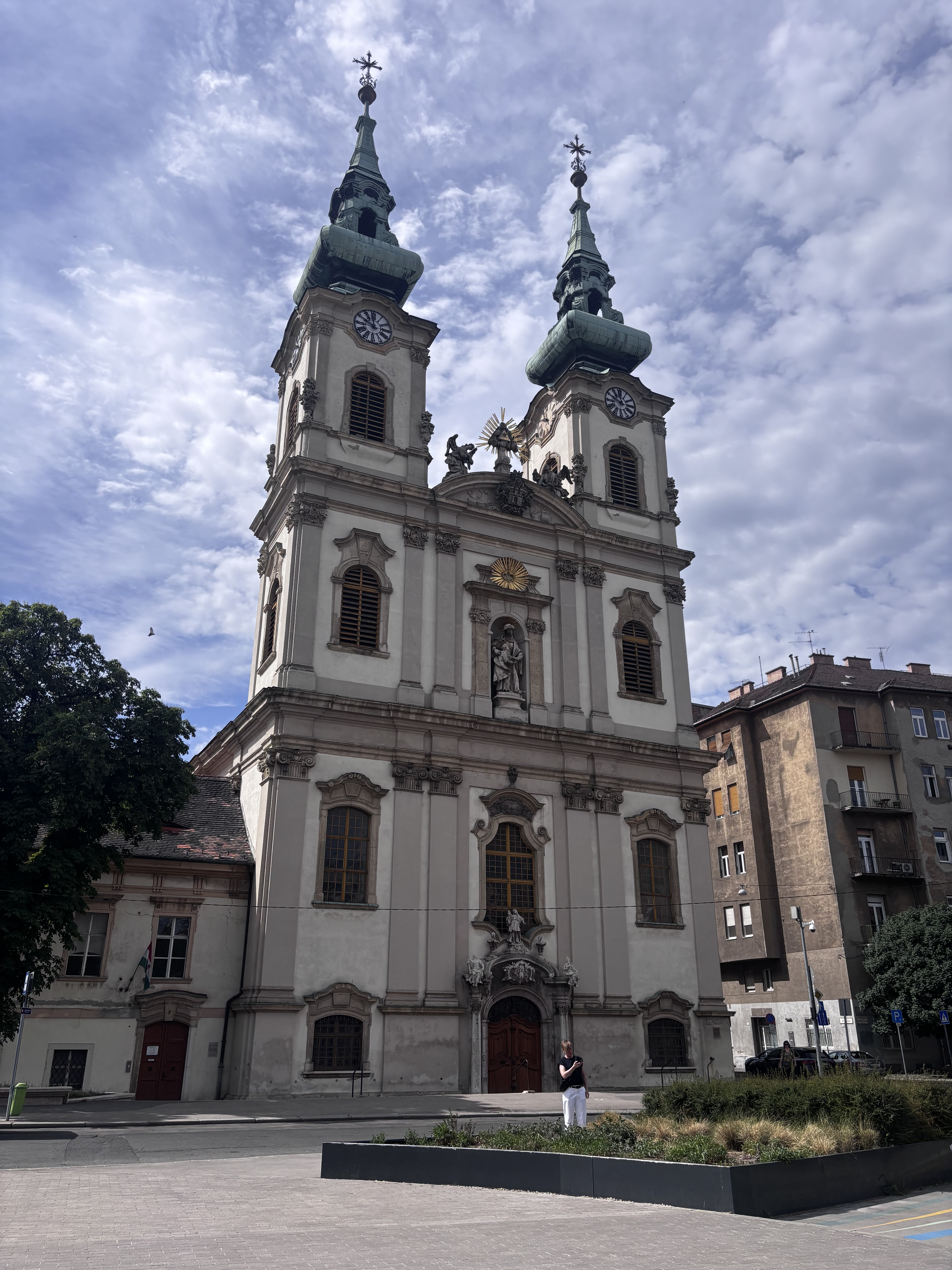
The church in 2026

The church was constructed following an Italian Baroque style as chosen by its two main architects in 1740. The church is considered as one of the most beautiful baroque structures in Budapest. It has two distinct bell towers, both 55 meters tall. The central façade features an allegorical representation of Hope, Faith, and Charity. Above the main portal a statue depicting Saint Anne presenting the Virgin Mary can be seen. The portal also contains the coat of arms of Buda. The top of the façade features a representation of the ‘Eye of God’ surrounded by angels.

=== Interior ===
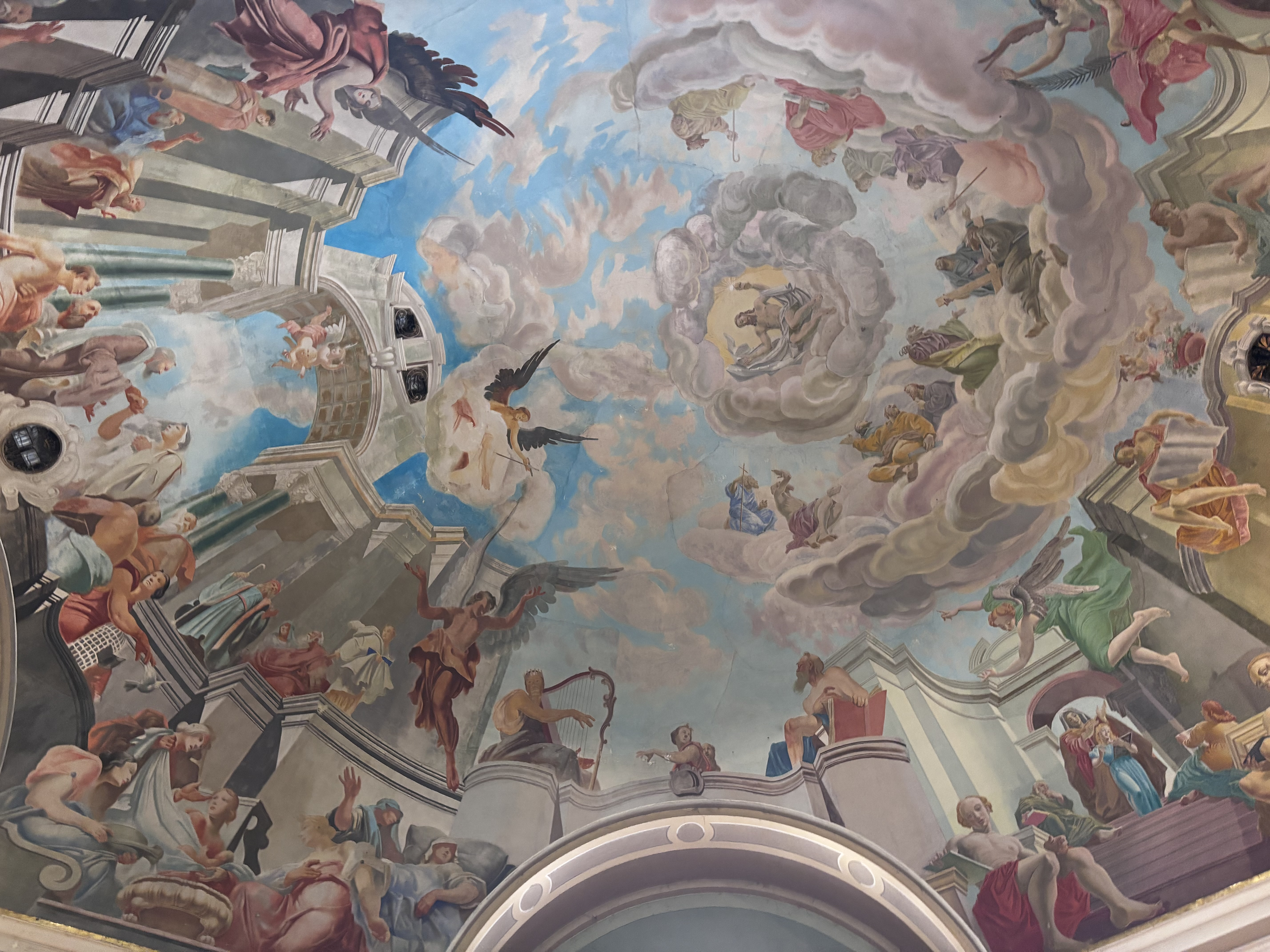
The ceiling fresco

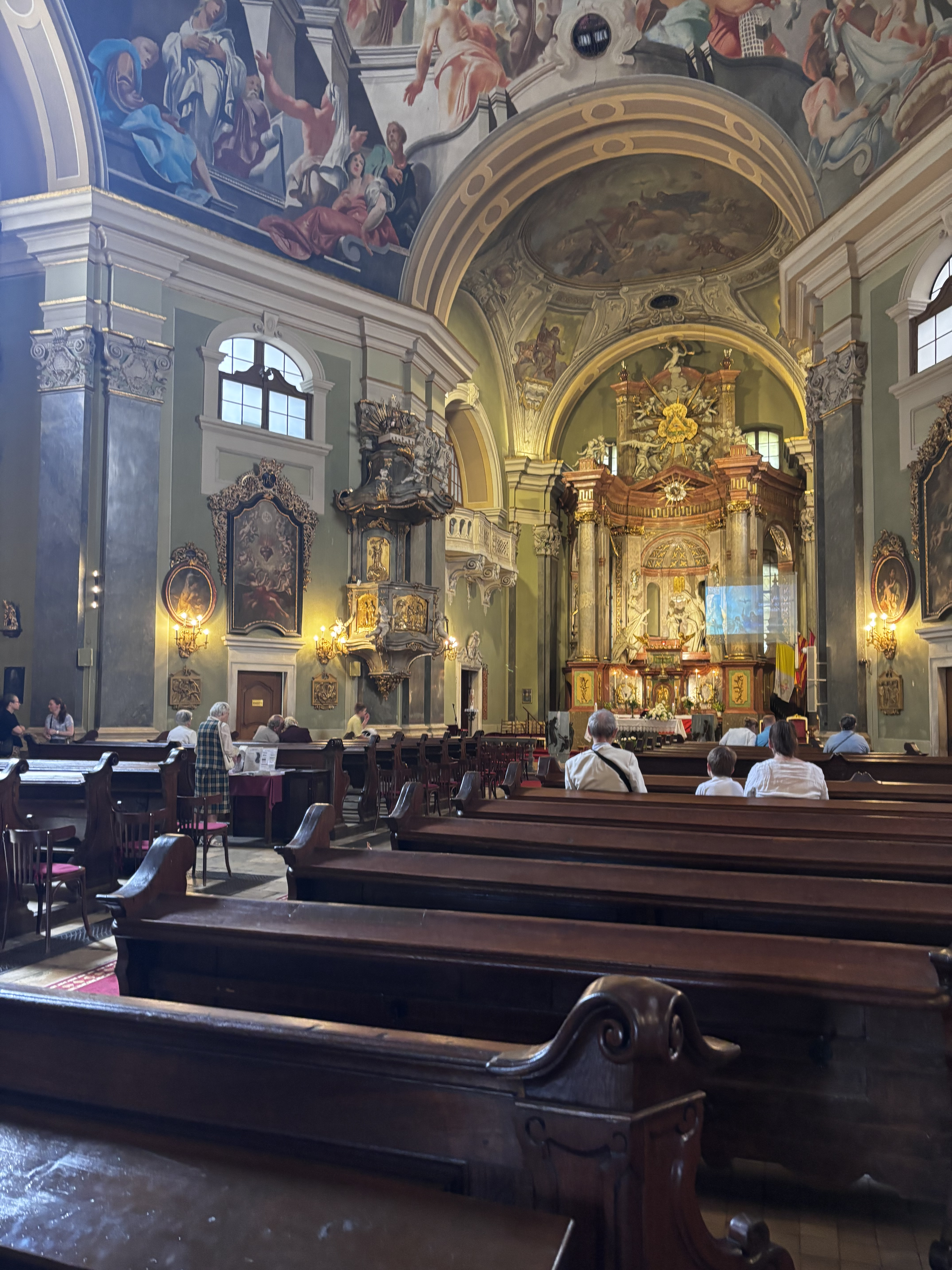
The interior

The interior of the church follows a Baroque centralised spatial design, organised around an oval dome covering an octagonal nave. The layout includes a northern entrance vestibule located beneath the organ and a southern sanctuary accessed through an arch. The dome is decorated with frescoes, including a depiction of the Holy Trinity by Gergely Vogl and a later Eucharistic composition by Béla Kontuly and C. Pál Molnár from 1938. The interior is structured with composite pilasters and includes four staircases leading to upper levels, as well as side chapels and a northern organ loft. The main altar represents the Temple of Jerusalem, featuring a sculptural group of six figures including Saint Anne, the Virgin Mary, Joachim, Zechariah, Elizabeth, and King David, created by Károly Bebo in the 18th century.
