= Běla =

Běla is female given name of Czech origin, meaning white, clear. It is the Czech form of Italian name Bianca and German name Blanka. The name is pronounced byeh-lah.

== Name Days ==
- Czech: 21 January

== Famous bearers ==
- Bjela Hrabková
- Běla Kolářová, Czech artist and photographer
- Běla Šarayová, Czech model
- Běla Fialová, Czech photographer
- Běla Hlaváčková, Czech swimmer
- Běla Hejná, Czech politician and medicine doctor
- Běla Jurdová, Czech actress
- Běla Gran Jensen
- Běla Sochorová, Czech breeder

== See also ==
- Béla, masculine given name of Hungarian origin
