= Szőlőskislak =

Former village in Hungary

Coordinates: 46°46′N 17°40′E

Szőlőskislak (also Szőllőskislak, Szőlős-Kislak) was a village in Somogy County, Hungary, but is now part of Balatonboglár.

== People ==
- Theodore von Kármán (Hungarian-American aerospace engineer and physicist. Full name refers to the Kármán family of Szőllőskislak)
