= Béla Szabados =

Béla Szabados may refer to:

- Béla Szabados (composer) (1867–1936), Hungarian composer
- Béla Szabados (swimmer) (born 1974), Hungarian Olympic swimmer
