= Béla Kovács =

Béla Kovács may refer to:

- Béla Kovács (clarinetist) (1937-2021), Hungarian clarinetist
- Béla Kovács (communist) (1910–1980), Hungarian politician and jurist, Minister of Justice, 1953–1954
- Béla Kovács (footballer) (born 1977), Hungarian football player
- Béla Kovács (politician, 1908) (1908–1959), Hungarian politician, Minister of Agriculture, 1945–1946
- Béla Kovács (politician, 1960) (born 1960), Hungarian politician and Member of the European Parliament
- Béla Turi-Kovács, (1935–2023), Hungarian politician
