= Som, Hungary =

Som
- Village
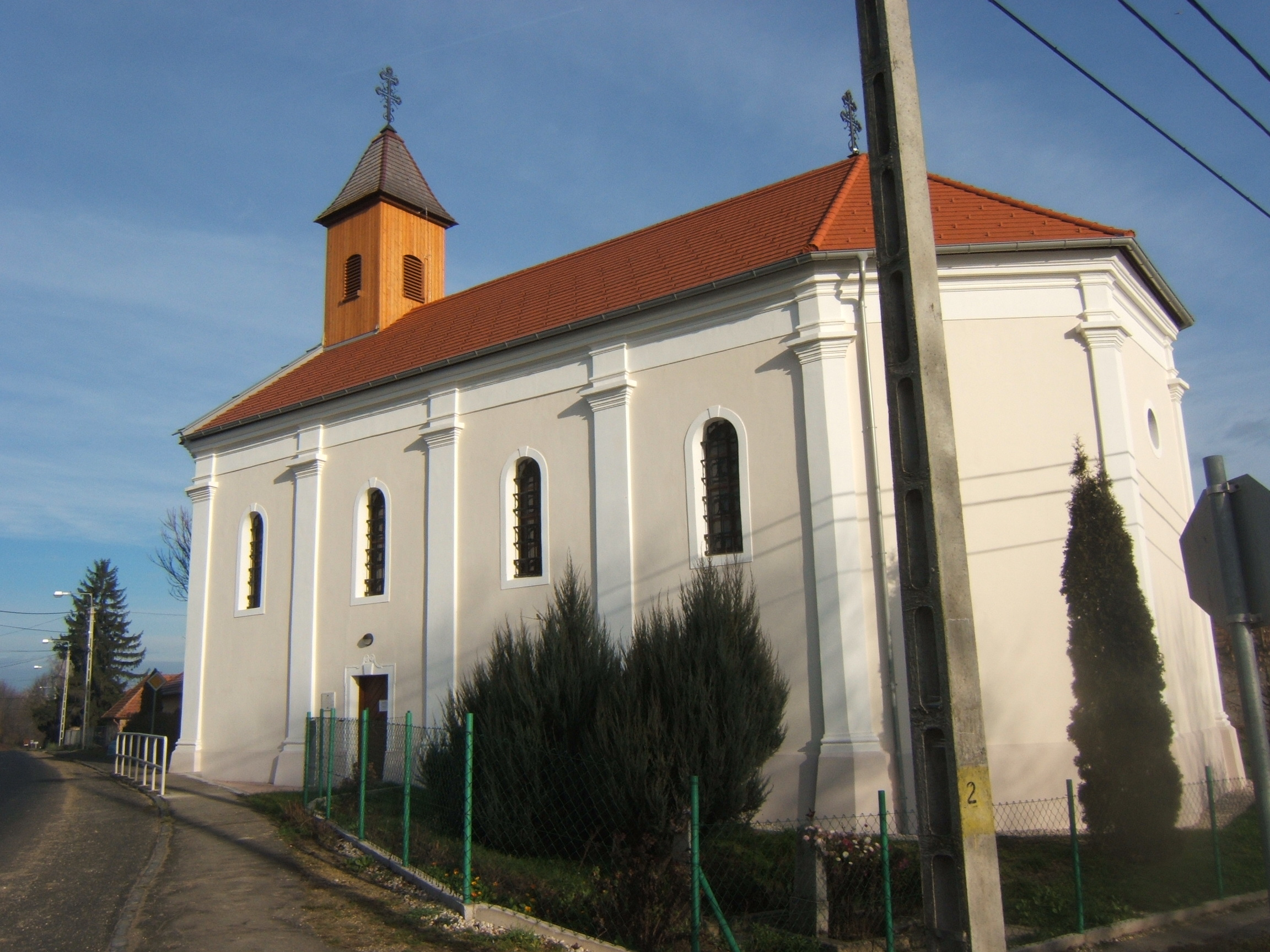
- Catholic church of Som

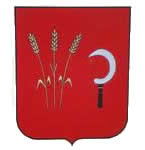
- Coat of arms

- Location of Somogy county in Hungary

- Location of Som, Hungary
- Coordinates: 46.80560°N 18.14252°E
- Country: Hungary
- Region: Southern Transdanubia
- County: Somogy
- District: Siófok
- RC Diocese: Kaposvár

Area
  - Total: 23.35 km^{2} (9.02 sq mi)

Population (2017)
  - Total: 650
  - Density: 28/km^{2} (72/sq mi)
- Demonym: somi
- Time zone: UTC+1 (CET)
  - Summer (DST): UTC+2 (CEST)
- Postal code: 8655
- Area code: (+36) 84
- NUTS 3 code: HU232
- MP: Mihály Witzmann (Fidesz)
- Website: Som Online

Som is a village in Siófok District, Somogy County, Hungary.

== Notable people ==
- Béla Iványi-Grünwald - painter
