= Bela De Nagy =

American fencer

Personal information
- Born: July 13, 1893
- Died: August 27, 1945 (aged 52) Manhattan, New York, United States

Sport
- Sport: Fencing

Bela De Nagy (July 13, 1893 – August 27, 1945) was an American fencer. He competed in the team sabre event at the 1936 Summer Olympics.
