= Béla Ormos =

Hungarian actor (1899–1945)

- Born: Béla Spitzer; 1 March 1899; Budapest, Hungary
- Died: 13 April 1945 (aged 46); Mauthausen concentration camp, Nazi Germany
- Occupation: Actor
- Years active: 1920–1939

Béla Ormos (born Béla Spitzer; 1 March 1899 – 13 April 1945) was a Hungarian actor. He was active in theatre and film between 1920 and 1939. A Jew, he was called up for labour service following the German occupation of Hungary and died in Mauthausen concentration camp weeks before the end of the Second World War.

== Selected filmography ==
- Iza néni (1933)
