= Béla Kathi =

Hungarian bodybuilder (1979–2025)

Béla Kathi (4 May 1979 – 31 July 2025) was a Hungarian bodybuilder.

== Life and career ==
Kathi was born in Hajdúböszörmény on 4 May 1979. In 2010, he set an unofficial world record in squatting with 360 kilograms, without a powerlifting suit. He then turned to bodybuilding, where he won the WABBA world championship title, among others, and won the Hungarian Superbody competition twice.

He stopped competing in 2012, focusing on his business ventures, including building the Cutler gym network, and returned to competing in 2017 and finished second at the Australian Arnold Classic in the over 100 kg category.

Kathi died in a bicycle collision in Cyprus, on 31 July 2025, at the age of 46. Local police said he died of head injuries near Ayia Napa.
