= Béla Kontuly =

Hungarian painter and art teacher

- Born: Béla Kontuly; 1904; Miskolc
- Died: 1983 (aged 78–79); Budapest
- Movement: School of Rome Novecento

Béla Kontuly (1904 in Miskolc – 1983 in Budapest) was a Hungarian painter and art teacher.

== His life ==
He completed his studies at the Academy of Fine Arts in Prague and the Academy of Fine Arts in Budapest, under István Réti and Andor Dudits. His works were already exhibited in the Eastern Slovakia Museum in Košice (Kassa) while he was still in college. From 1928 to 1930, he was a scholarship recipient of the Hungarian Academy in Rome together with his wife, Hajnalka Fuchs.

In 1932, he organized a collection exhibition of his works at the Ernst Museum. In 1934, he joined the Munkácsy Céh Art Association. He created the frescoes of the staircase of the University of Szeged, the Hermina út chapel in Budapest, the Church of the Holy Spirit in Herminamező and the Catholic church in Komárom, and in 1939 the murals of the St. Anne’s Church; the latter together with C. Pál Molnár.

His significant works also include: the decoration of the Vác Cathedral and the Domonkos Church on Thököly út in Budapest, as well as the fresco titled the 'Announcement of the Golden Bull' in the hall of the Székesfehérvár town hall. In 1940, he received the Székesfőváros award for his painting called 'The Resurrection of Jairus's Daughter'.

From 1939 to 1947 he taught at the College of Fine Arts. After 1945, he mainly restored frescoes on commission and painted murals for churches. In 1974, he organized a collection exhibition of his works in Tokyo, which was also his last exhibition.
