= Béla Kádár =

Hungarian painter

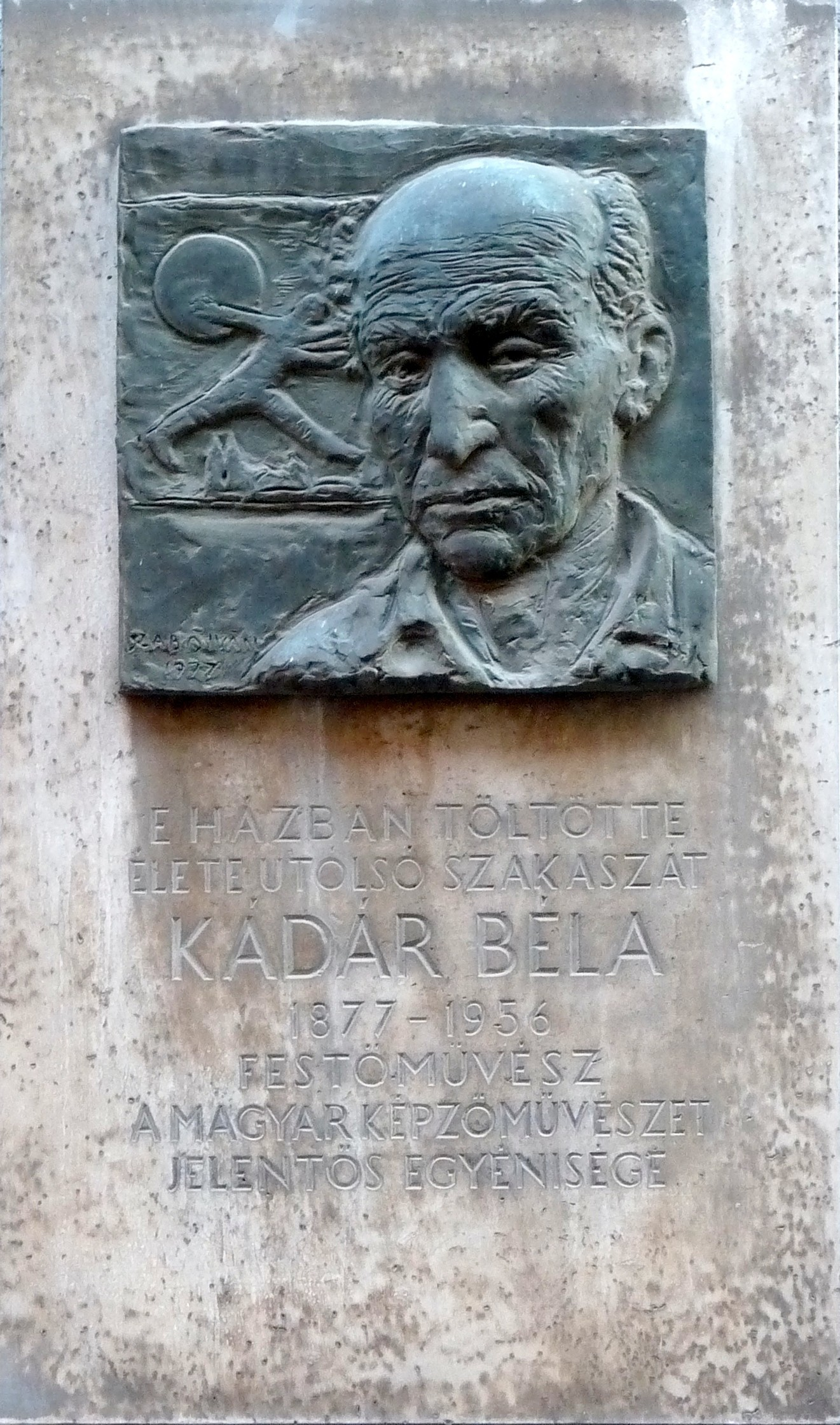
- Béla Kádár commemorative plaque with relief in Budapest, Hungary
- Born: 1877
- Died: 1956 (aged 78–79)
- Occupation: painter

Béla Kádár (1877–1956) was a Hungarian painter influenced by Der Blaue Reiter, Cubism, Futurism, Neo-Primitivism, Constructivism, and Metaphysical painting.

== Biography ==
Kádár was born into a working-class Jewish family. After only six years of schooling he was apprenticed as an iron-turner. He began painting murals in Budapest. He visited Paris and Berlin in 1910 and by 1918 had moved to western Europe. He had his first important exhibition in October 1923 at Herwarth Walden's Galerie Der Sturm, in Berlin, showing work in an expressionist style. During the exhibition he met Katherine Dreier, who put on two exhibitions of his work at the Brooklyn Museum of Art in New York City, the second of which, in September 1928, Kádár attended.
