= Balatonboglár =

Balatonboglár Boglárlelle (1979–1991, together with Balatonlelle)
- Town
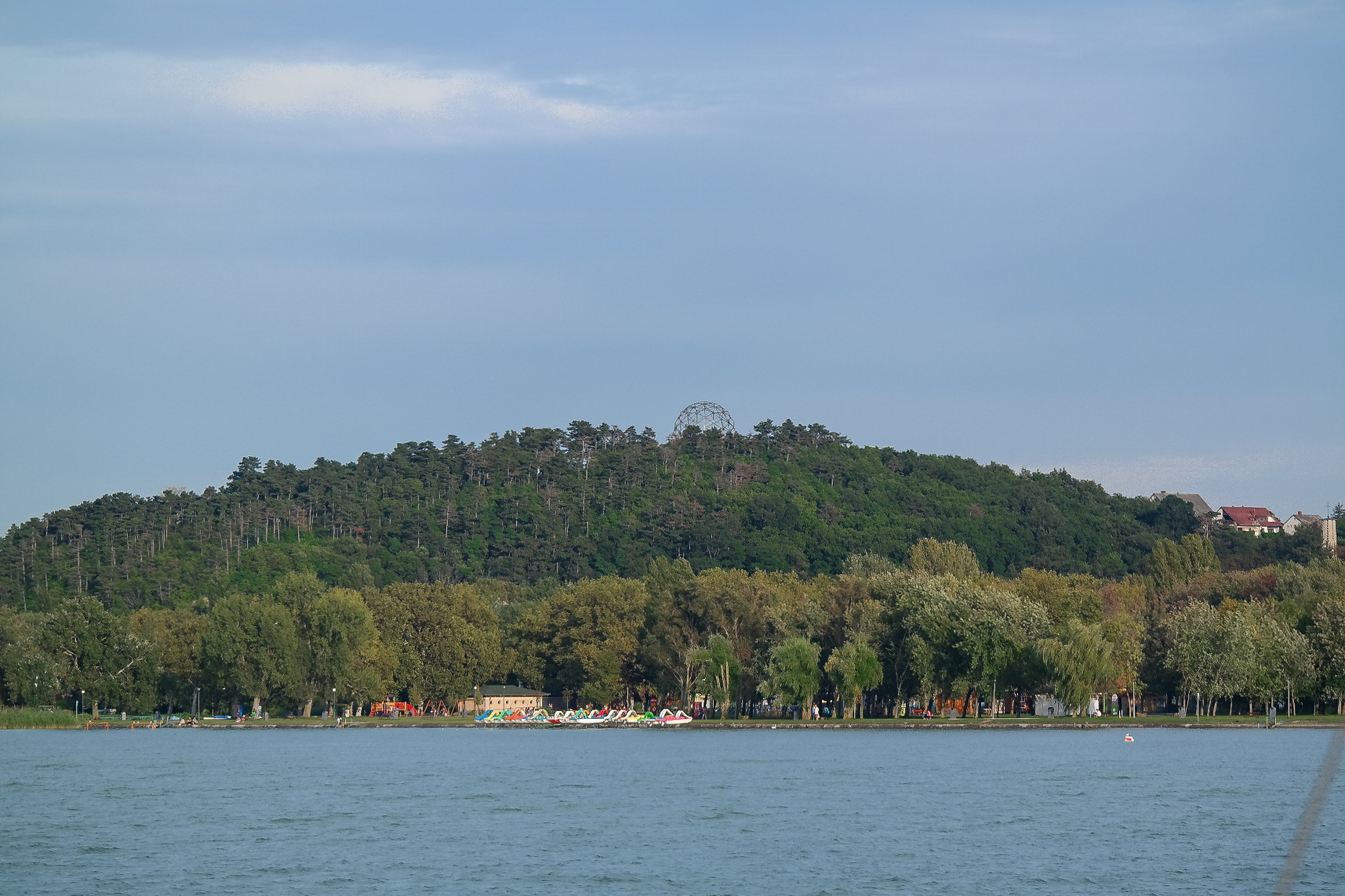
- Skyline of Balatonboglár

- Flag Coat of arms

- Location of Balatonboglár
- Coordinates: 46.77845°N 17.65488°E
- Country: Hungary
- Region: Southern Transdanubia
- County: Somogy
- District: Fonyód
- RC Diocese: Kaposvár

Area
  - Total: 32.04 km^{2} (12.37 sq mi)

Population (2017)
  - Total: 5,568
  - Density: 173.8/km^{2} (450.1/sq mi)
- Demonym(s): boglári, balatonboglári
- Time zone: UTC+1 (CET)
  - Summer (DST): UTC+2 (CEST)
- Postal code: 8630
- Area code: (+36) 85
- Motorways: M7
- Distance from Budapest: 144 km (89 mi) Northeast
- NUTS 3 code: HU232
- MP: József Attila Móring (KDNP)
- Website: Balatonboglár Online

Balatonboglár is a resort town situated on the south shore of Lake Balaton in Somogy County, Hungary. It is the official centre of the Balatonboglár wine region, and is often called the "town of grapes and wine."

Between 1979 and 1991 Balatonboglár formed a single settlement together with Balatonlelle under the name Boglárlelle.

== History ==
The region has been populated for more than six thousand years. The area was first documented in 1211. The first bathing association was established in 1904, and Balatonboglár was declared a medicinal bath in 1912. Balatonboglár and Balatonlelle were unified as Boglárlelle from 1979 until October 1, 1991.

The Xantus look-out tower, the symbol of the city, resides on top of a hill and is well lit at night. It is named for John Xantus de Vesey.

== Main sights ==
=== Statue of Pál Teleki ===
The city is host to a statue honoring a controversial figure in Hungarian history, Pál Teleki, who was twice prime minister of Hungary. Teleki was regarded by some as a flawed hero and he remained a controversial person long after his death. This was reflected in a public dispute covered in the Hungarian media during early 2004 over a statue of him, marking the 63rd anniversary of his death. The statue by sculptor Tibor Rieger was originally to be installed opposite the President's official residence in Budapest. However, the Minister of Culture István Hiller, following pressure from the Wiesenthal Center, canceled these plans. On 5 April 2004, the statue was finally placed in the courtyard of the Catholic Church in Balatonboglár. Balatonboglár had during World War II been host to thousands of Polish refugees who opened in that town one of only two secondary schools for Poles in Europe during 1939-1944. They credited Teleki with opening Hungary's borders to them and named a street in Warsaw for him after the war ended.

== Gallery ==
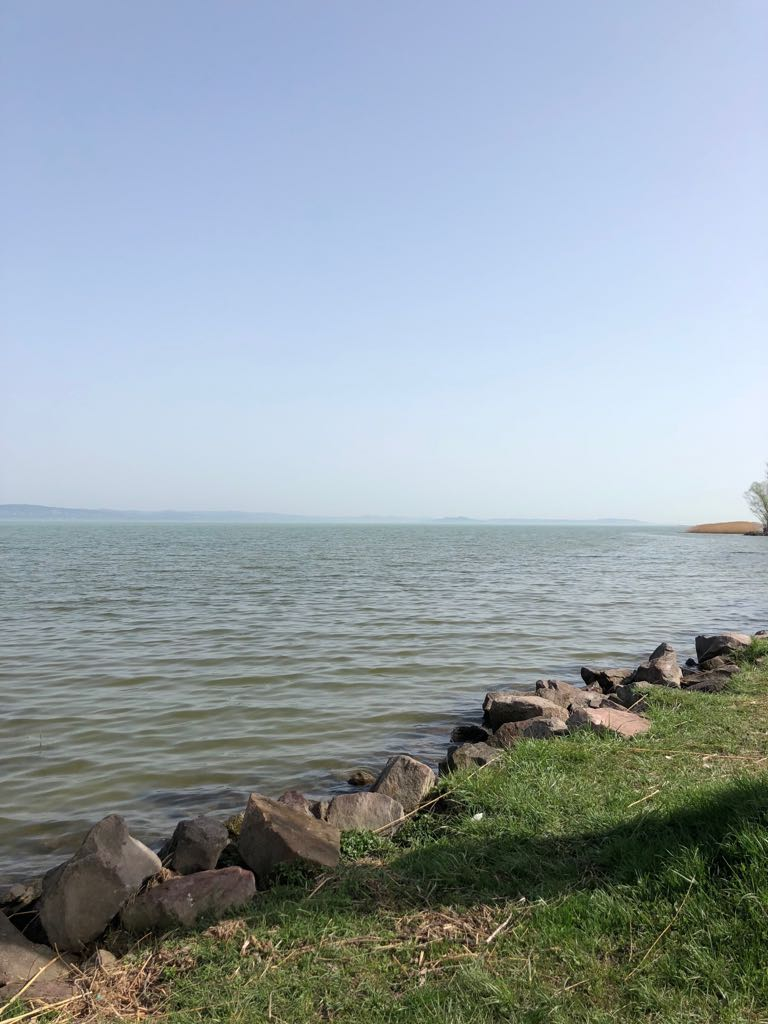
Lake Balaton in Balatonboglár

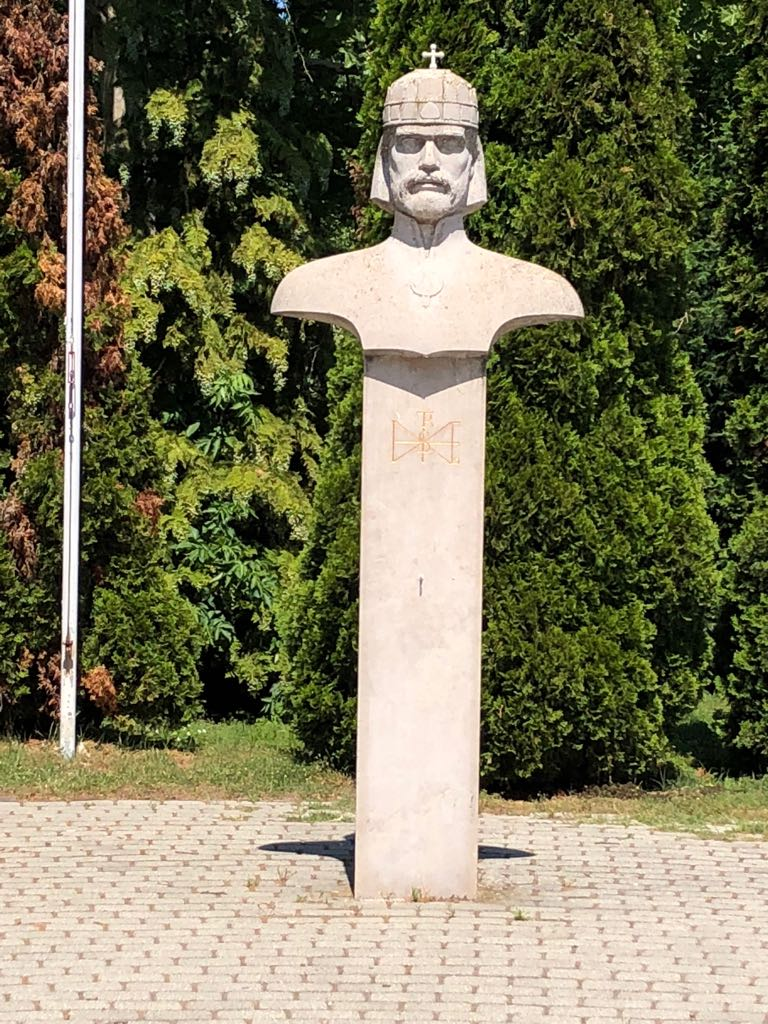
Saint Stephen of Hungary Statue

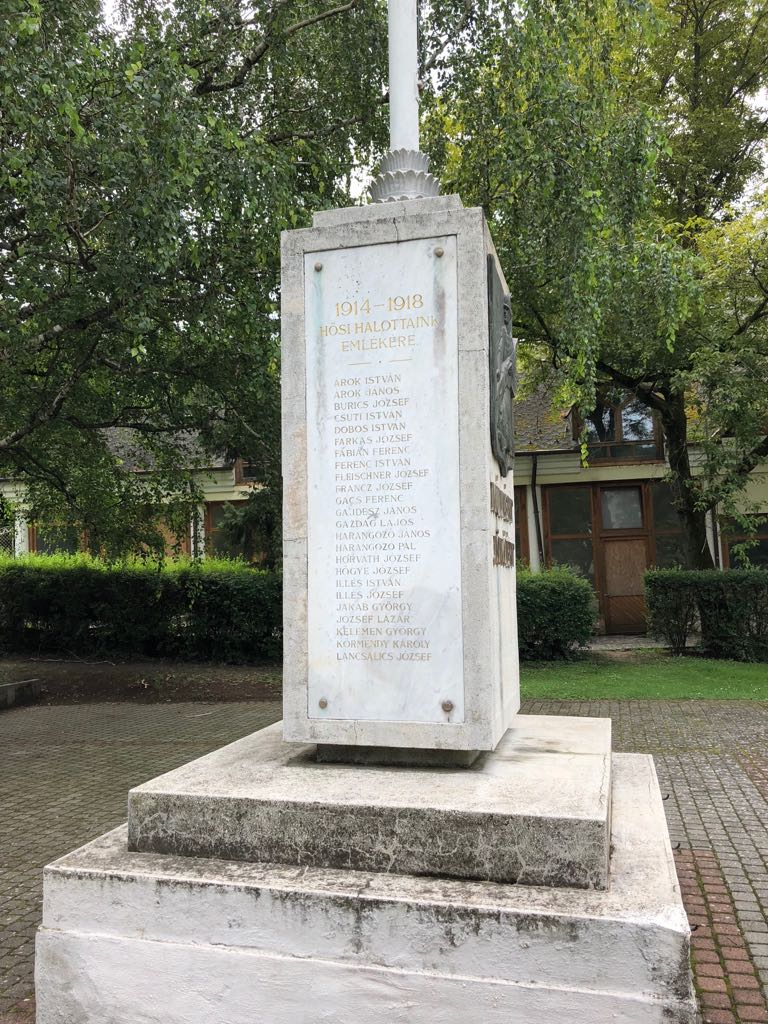
War Memorial - Plaque of those who died in the First World War

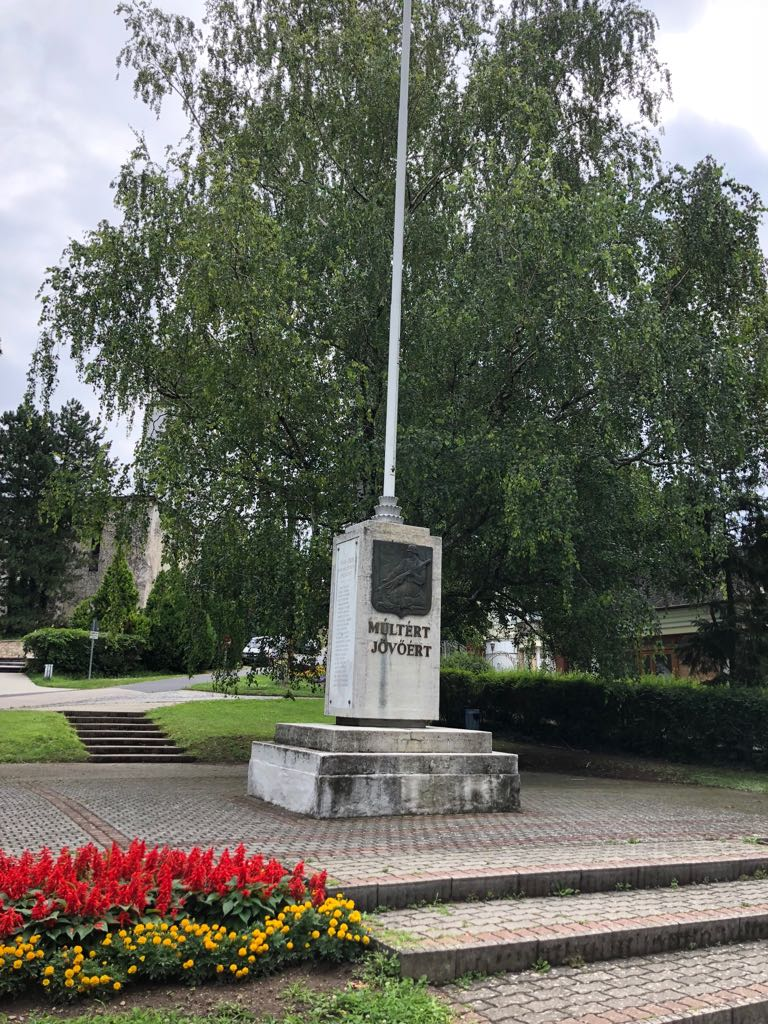
War Memorial

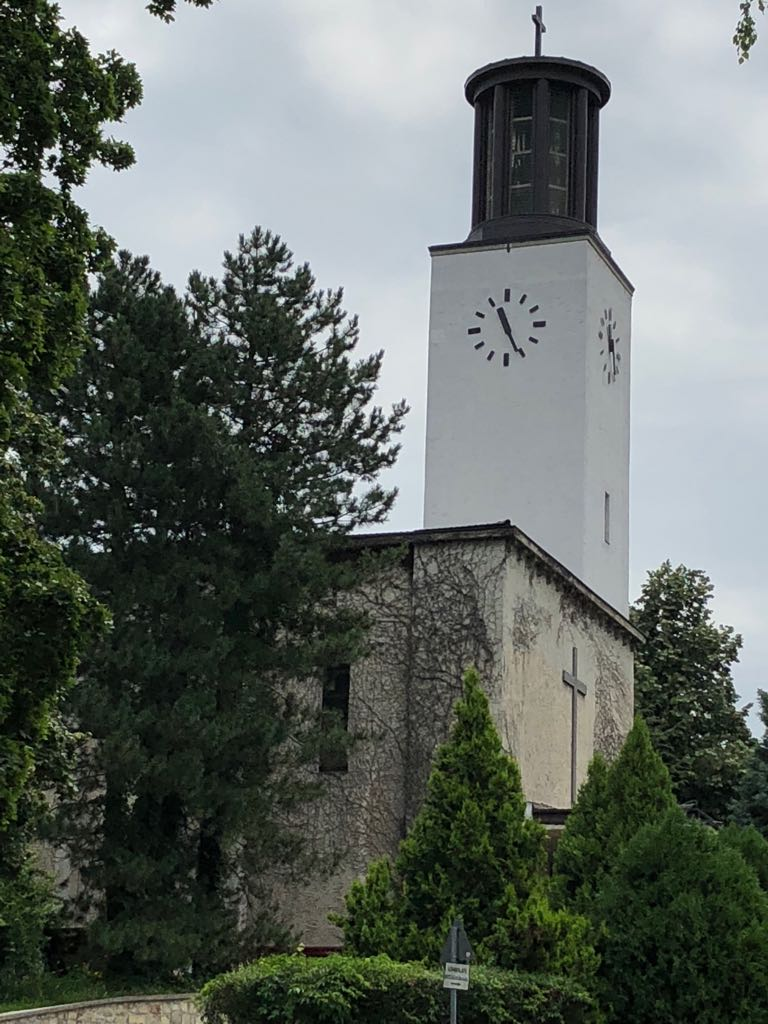
Roman Catholic Church of the Assumption

== See also ==
- List of places in Hungary whose names were changed
