= Béla Szekeres =

Béla Szekeres may refer to:

- Béla Szekeres (cyclist) (born 1933), Hungarian cyclist
- Béla Szekeres (runner) (1938–2000), Hungarian middle-distance runner
