= Béla Illés (writer) =

Hungarian writer and journalist

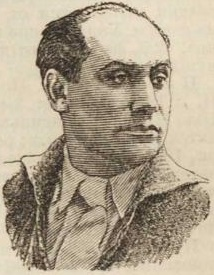
Illustration of Béla Illés in the Great Soviet Encyclopedia, 1933

Béla Illés (Born: Béla Lipner from Kassa, Austria-Hungary; now Košice, Slovakia), March 22, 1895 – Budapest, January 5, 1974) was a Hungarian left-wing and Communist writer and journalist of Jewish descent, who spent over 20 years of his life in exile in the Soviet Union. In 1945 he returned to Hungary in Soviet uniform as a major in the Red Army.

In now Communist Hungary, he was not particularly appreciated by the Minister of Culture, József Révai, nor by György Lukács. However, he was used as a writer of articles intended for the masses glorifying the communist system and the Soviet Union. He himself took the model role for literary Socialist realism. He was awarded the Kossuth Prize twice, in 1950 and 1956. In 1948, he came up with the (almost certainly fictional) story of the Belarusian cavalry captain Alexei Gusev, who had opposed the tsarist intervention in the suppression of the 1848 revolution in Hungary in 1848, and had been executed for it in Minsk along with six companions. In 1948, a Hungarian delegation travelled to the Soviet Union to pay their respects at the graves of Gusev and his companions. However, the graves and the archival documents cited by Illés were nowhere to be found. (Illés claimed he had found information about Gusev in the Minsk archives. However, the archives were burnt to the ground during the Second World War, so there was nothing left to research.) Although Béla Illés never admitted to the forgery, historians saw it as proven by the mid-1950s. However, in contemporary Communist propaganda, Gusev became a symbol of the (purported) centuries-old Russian-Hungarian and then Soviet-Hungarian "friendship", coincidentally with the centennial of the 1848 revolution, which was celebrated in Hungary on a grand scale. His writing was printed en masse, and streets were named after Gusev.

== Publications ==
- Illés, Béla (1987). Karpats'ka rapsodiia : roman, opovidannia [Carpathian rapsody] (in Ukrainian). Uzhgorod: Karpati. OCLC 224121020. Carpathian Rapody was fst published in English in 1963 by Corvina, trans. Grace Blair the wife of Emil Gardos
