= Béla Varga =

Béla Varga may refer to:

- Béla Varga (wrestler) (1888–1969), Hungarian Olympic wrestler
- Béla Varga (politician) (1903–1995), Hungarian Catholic priest and politician
