= Béla Serényi =

Hungarian politician (1866–1919)

Dr. Serényi Béla.jpg
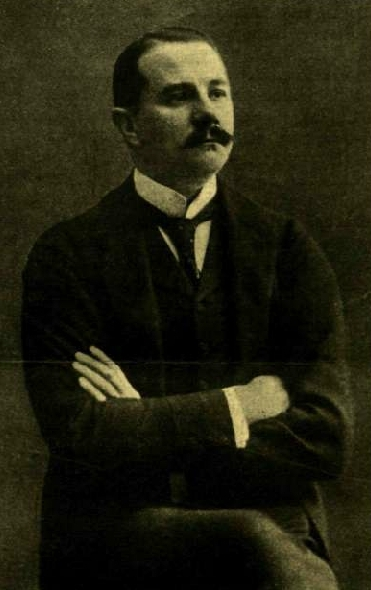

Minister of Agriculture of Hungary
- In office 17 January 1910 – 10 June 1913
- Prime Minister: Károly Khuen-Héderváry; László Lukács
- Preceded by: Ignác Darányi
- Succeeded by: Imre Ghillány
- In office 11 February 1918 – 31 October 1918
- Prime Minister: Sándor Wekerle
- Preceded by: Sándor Wekerle
- Succeeded by: Barna Buza

Personal details
- Born: 16 June 1866 Pest, Kingdom of Hungary
- Died: 14 October 1919 (aged 53) Budapest, Hungary
- Party: Liberal Party, Party of National Work
- Profession: politician

Count Béla Serényi de Kis-Serény (16 June 1866 – 14 October 1919) was a Hungarian politician, who served as Minister of Agriculture twice: between 1910–1913 and in 1918.

He was born into a Hungarian noble family in Pest. His parents were Count László Serényi, a landowner in Putnok and Countess Ludmilla Bubna de Lititz. He finished his studies in the Theresianum, Vienna and studied law in Budapest. He was a member of the House of Magnates, where he supported the government's religion politics in his speeches. Later he politicized in the House of Representatives. He served as Minister of Trade from 1917 to 1918. Serényi left the Party of National Work in 1916.

Political offices
Preceded by Ignác Darányi	Minister of Agriculture; 1910–1913	Succeeded by Imre Ghillány
Preceded by Sándor Wekerle	Minister of Agriculture; 1918	Succeeded by Barna Buza
