= Móric Esterházy =

Hungarian politician (1881–1960)

Count Móric Esterházy de Galántha et Fraknó
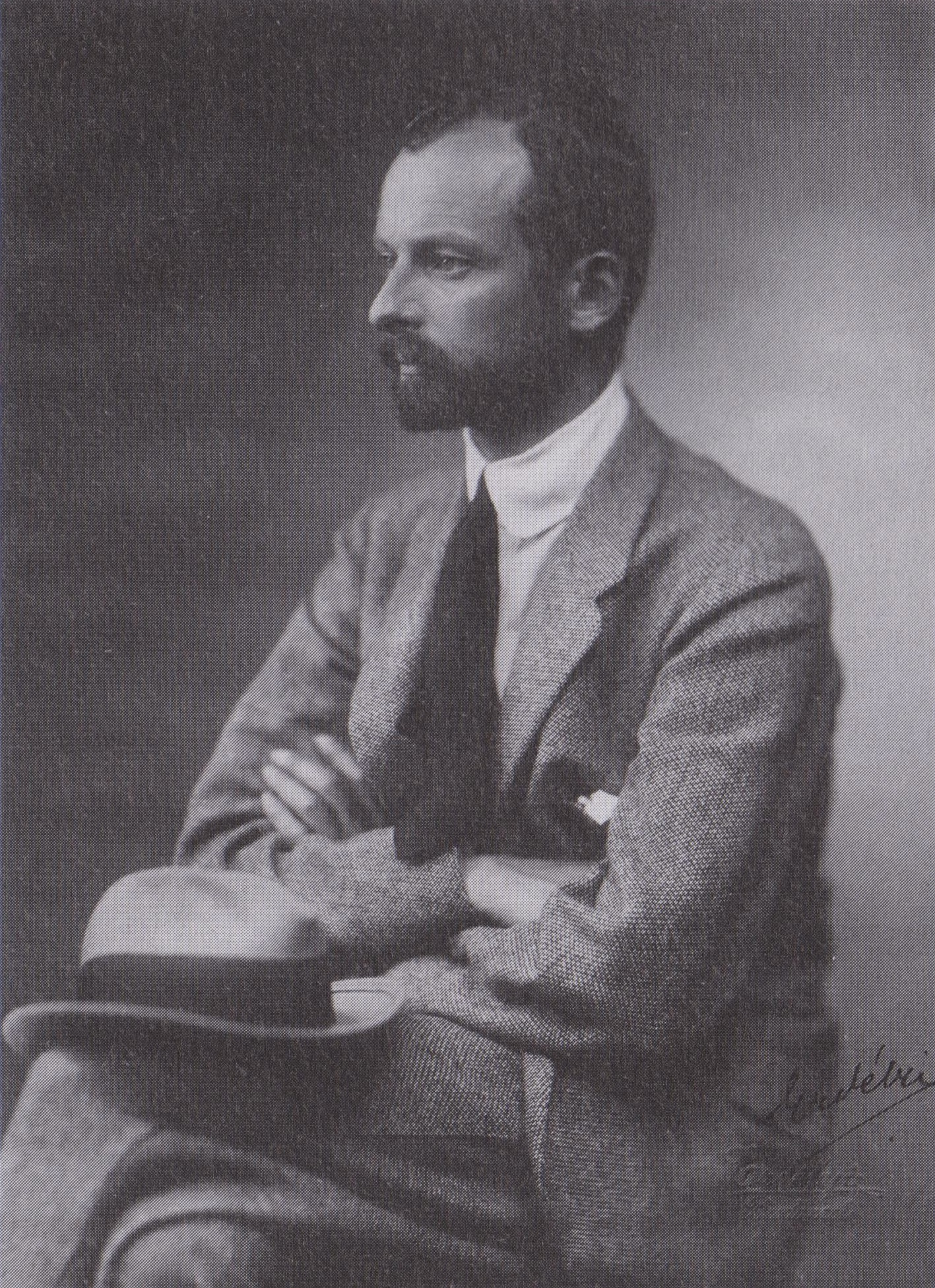

Prime Minister of the Kingdom of Hungary
- In office 15 June – 20 August 1917
- Monarch: Charles IV
- Preceded by: István Tisza
- Succeeded by: Sándor Wekerle

Personal details
- Born: 27 April 1881 Majk (today Oroszlány), Kingdom of Hungary, Austria-Hungary
- Died: 28 June 1960 (aged 79) Vienna, Austria
- Spouse: Countess Margit Károlyi de Nagykároly
- Children: Mátyás Benedek Esterházy; Marcel Gyula Esterházy; Menyhert Alajos Esterházy; Monika Margit Esterházy

Count Móric Esterházy de Galántha et Fraknó (Hungarian: [ˈɛstɛrɦaːzi ˈmoːrit͡s], 27 April 1881 – 28 June 1960) was a Hungarian aristocrat and politician.

== Life ==
He served as prime minister for a few months during World War I, after the fall of István Tisza. His attempts at reform were defeated by Tisza's conservative forces, and he quickly resigned, to be replaced by the weak administration of Sándor Wekerle. After the war he devoted himself to the management of his large estate. For the Christian Economic Party, he became a member of the Hungarian Parliament again in 1931 and a representative of his party in the important Economic Committee.

== Family and ancestry ==
Móric Esterházy was the grandfather of football player Márton Esterházy (1956– ) and writer Péter Esterházy (1950–2016).

Ancestors of Móric Esterházy

16. Count János Esterházy de Galántha
8. Count Miklos Janos Esterházy de Galántha
17. Maria Anna, Countess Pálffy ab Erdöd
4. Count Móric Esterházy de Galántha
18. Philippe Albert de Baudry, Marquis de Roisin
9. Marie Françoise de Baudry, Marquise de Roisin
19. Françoise de Retz de Bressoles, Comtesse de Chanclos
2. Count Miklós Esterházy de Galántha et Fraknó
20. Anton Isidor, Prince Lobkowicz
10. August Longin, Prince Lobkowicz
21. Maria Sidonia, Countess Kinská z Vchynic a Tetova
5. Princess Maria Polyxena Lobkowicz
22. Joseph Johann, Prince zu Schwarzenberg, Duke of Krumau
11. Bertha, Princess zu Schwarzenberg
23. Pauline, Princess and Duchess d'Arenberg
1. Count Móric Esterházy de Galántha et Fraknó
24. Joseph Johann, Prince zu Schwarzenberg, Duke of Krumau
12. Johann Adolph II, Prince zu Schwarzenberg
25. Pauline, Princess and Duchess d'Arenberg
6. Adolph Joseph, Prince zu Schwarzenberg, Duke of Crumau
26. Moritz, Prince von und zu Liechtenstein
13. Eleonore, Princess von und zu Liechtenstein
27. Maria Leopoldine, Princess Esterházy de Galántha
3. Princess Franziska zu Schwarzenberg
28. Johann I Joseph, Prince of Liechtenstein
14. Aloys II, Prince of Liechtenstein
29. Landgravine Josepha of Fürstenberg-Weitra
7. Princessin Ida von und zu Liechtenstein
30. Count Franz de Paula Joseph of Wchinitz and Tettau
15. Countess Franziska Kinsky of Wchinitz and Tettau
31. Countess Therese of Wrbna and Freudenthal

Political offices
Preceded by István Tisza	Prime Minister of Hungary; 1917	Succeeded by Sándor Wekerle
