= Béla Bánáthy =

Béla Bánáthy may refer to:

- Béla H. Bánáthy (1919–2003), American linguist and systems scientist
- Béla A. Bánáthy (born 1943), American systems scientist
