= Béla Szabados (composer) =

Hungarian composer (1867–1936)

Béla Szabados (3 June 1867 – 5 September 1936) was a Hungarian composer.

Szabados was born in Pest. He first studied composition and the piano with Gyula Erkel, later with Robert Volkmann, Hans Koessler and Sándor Nikolits. In 1888 he joined the staff of the Academy of Music and Dramatic Art as accompanist and coach, and in 1893 was appointed piano teacher and coach at the reorganized Academy of Music. His first string quartet was awarded the Milleniumi Király-dij (Millennial King’s Prize) in 1896. He was appointed professor of singing at the academy in 1920 and two years later he became head of the newly established department for training professors of singing. In 1927 he was appointed principal of the National Conservatory, in which position he remained until his death in Budapest.

Szabados's music, at once poetic and restrained, is essentially conservative in character; his language never advanced beyond that of the late Romantics. He was principally known as a composer for the theatre and also as a singing teacher: his pedagogical works were in official use by the academy. He composed two operas, Maria (1905), Fanny (1927).

== Sources ==
- John S. Weissmann/Péter P. Várnai. The New Grove Dictionary of Opera, edited by Stanley Sadie (1992), ISBN 0-333-73432-7 and ISBN 1-56159-228-5
