= Béla Gyarmati =

Hungarian fencer

Personal information
- Born: 5 May 1942 (age 84) Budapest, Hungary

Sport
- Sport: Fencing

Béla Gyarmati (born 5 March 1942) is a Hungarian fencer. He competed in the team foil event at the 1964 Summer Olympics.
