= Béla Kovács (clarinetist) =

Hungarian clarinetist (1937–2021)

Béla Kovács (1 May 1937 – 7 November 2021) was a Hungarian clarinetist and composer.

== Education ==
Kovács was born in Tatabánya, Hungary. He graduated from the Franz Liszt Academy of Music in Budapest, Hungary.

== Career ==
Kovács was principal clarinetist with the Hungarian State Opera Orchestra and the Budapest Philharmonic Orchestra from 1956 to 1981.

Kovács was a Professor of Clarinet at the Franz Liszt Academy of Music in Budapest from 1975 through 2020 and at the University of Music and Dramatic Arts in Graz, Austria beginning in 1989. He is best known for his "Hommages," a set of ten pieces each based on the style of a different composer.

== Compositions ==
Hommages for Solo Clarinet

- Hommage à J.S. Bach
- Hommage à G. Gershwin
- Hommage à N. Paganini
- Hommage à C.M. von Weber
- Hommage à C. Debussy
- Hommage à M. de Falla
- Hommage à R. Strauss
- Hommage à B. Bartók
- Hommage à Z. Kodály
- Hommage à A. Khachaturian

Studies and Exercises

- I Learn to Play the Clarinet 1
- I Learn to Play the Clarinet 2
- Everyday Scale Exercises
- After you, Mr. Gershwin!
