= Béla Tomka =

Hungarian historian

Béla Tomka (born 8 May 1962 in Salgótarján) is a Hungarian historian and a professor at the Department of History, University of Szeged, founder and head of the Department of Contemporary History. His main research area is 20th century social and economic history, with a special emphasis on international comparisons.

== Studies and degrees ==
He earned a master's degree in History and History of Eastern Europe at the University of Szeged, followed by postgraduate studies in economic and social history at the Corvinus University Budapest, in the United States (Minneapolis), and in Germany (Münster). He gained the dr. univ. degree in History in 1995, while a year later he received his PhD title in Economic and Social History. In his dissertation, later published as a book, he analyzed the relationship between banks and industry in Hungary at the turn of the 19th and 20th century, based on a wide range of archival sources. At the same time his aim was to reevaluate the arguments developed by R. Hilferding and A. Gerschenkron that have been influencing international economic history for many years. Tomka defended his habilitation thesis (‘venia legendi’) in 2004. In 2010 the Hungarian Academy of Sciences awarded him the Higher Doctorate (DSc) title. This dissertation aimed at determining the place of Hungary in the system of 20th-century European social and economic convergences and divergences with the systematic empirical analysis of several social and economic fields.

== Research ==
Within the social and economic history of 20th century Hungary and Europe, Tomka's research has centred on changes of population and family patterns, and the welfare state. His latest works have focused on the comparative history of economic growth, consumption and the quality of life in East Central Europe. His research interest also encompasses the history of violence, propaganda, European integration, as well as globalization in the 20th and 21st centuries.

== Professional affiliations ==
Since 1992, Tomka has been co-editor of Aetas, a Quarterly Journal of History and Related Disciplines, and a member of other editorial boards of academic periodicals: Esély, a Journal of Social Policy; The Hungarian Historical Review, Demográfia. In 2010 he became a board member of the International Social History Association (ISHA, Amsterdam), and since 2011 he has been the editor of the newsletter of this association.

Between 2016-2022, Tomka was the president of the István Hajnal Society of Social History. He is also an external founding member of the Social and Economic History PhD program at Eötvös University (ELTE, Budapest). He is the founder and head of the Doctoral Programme in Contemporary and Comparative History at the University of Szeged (2015). He is the leader of the MTA-SZTE-ELTE History of Globalization Research Group established by two universities and the Hungarian Academy of Sciences in 2019.

== Publications and awards ==
Tomka is the author of 17 books, the editor of several other volumes, and has published a number of scholarly articles. Tomka has been invited by several research institutes and universities in Europe and North-America as research fellow and visiting professor (Amsterdam, Mannheim, Berlin, Oxford, Edinburgh, Portland (OR), Regensburg, Hradec Králové, Jena). His major awards include the Bolyai Award for Outstanding Scholarly Contributions (2010) by the Bolyai Foundation Budapest, the Award of the Academy (for Distinguished Scholarly Achievement) endowed by the Hungarian Academy of Sciences in 2010, and Outstanding Academic Title 2013 Award by Choice, American Library Association (for A Social History of Twentieth-Century Europe, London and New York: Routledge, 2013). In 2021 he received the Best Publication Award in the field of humanities and social sciences from the University of Szeged.

== Selected works ==
- Korszakok és korszakhatárok: Jelenkortörténeti tanulmányok. (Budapest: Osiris, 2023). ISBN 9789632764863. English: Historical Eras and Historical Divides: Studies in Contemporary History
- Globalizáció Kelet-Közép-Európában a második világháború után: narratívák és ellennarratívák. (Pécs: Kronosz, 2023). ISBN 9786156604088. English: Globalization in East-Central Europe after the Second World War: Narratives and Counter-narratives
- Austerities and Aspirations: A Comparative History of Growth, Consumption and Quality of Life in East Central Europe since 1945. (Budapest and New York: Central European University Press, 2020). ISBN 9789633863510.
- Európa társadalomtörténete a 20. században. (Budapest: Osiris Kiadó, 2020). ISBN 9789632764184. English: A Social History of 20th Century Europe, fully revised second edition
- A social history of twentieth-century Europe. (London and New York: Routledge, 2013). ISBN 9780415628457. Regarded as "a work of substantial benefit to a broad readership".
- Gazdasági növekedés, fogyasztás és életminőség: Magyarország nemzetközi összehasonlításban az első világháborútól napjainkig. (Budapest: Akadémiai Kiadó, 2011). ISBN 9789630597210. English: Economic Growth, Consumption and Quality of Life: Hungary in an International Comparison, 1918 to Present
- Welfare in East and West: Hungarian Social Security in an International Comparison, 1918-1990. (Berlin: Akademie Verlag, 2004). ISBN 9783050038711.
- Családfejlődés a 20. századi Magyarországon és Nyugat-Európában: konvergencia vagy divergencia? (Budapest: Osiris Kiadó, 2000). ISBN 9633794846. English: Family Development in Hungary and Western Europe in the 20th Century: Convergence or Divergence?
