= Béla Iványi-Grünwald =

Hungarian painter (1867–1940)

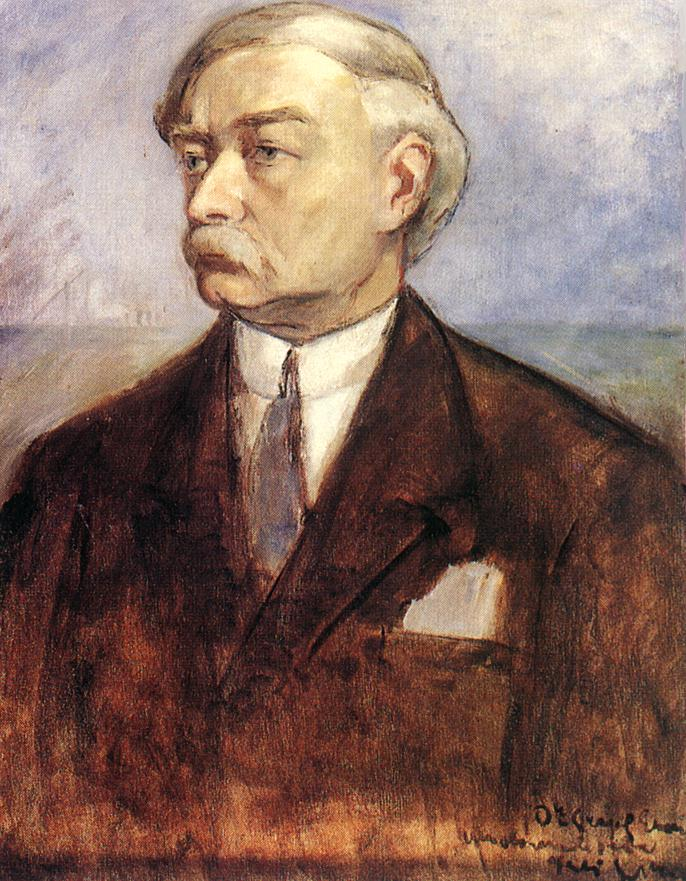
- Self-portrait, ca. 1903
- Born: 6 May 1867; Som, Hungary
- Died: 24 September 1940 (aged 73)
- Education: Academy of Fine Arts (Budapest), Académie Julian
- Known for: Painting
- Movement: Naturalism, Fauvism, Baroque

Béla Iványi-Grünwald (6 May 1867 – 24 September 1940) was a Hungarian painter, a leading member of the Nagybánya artists' colony and founder of the Kecskemét artists' colony.

== Life ==
Born in Som, Iványi-Grünwald began his artistic studies under Bertalan Székely and Károly Lotz at the Academy of Fine Arts in Budapest (1882–1886) and continued them at Munich in 1886–87 and at the Académie Julian in Paris from 1887 to 1890. From 1891 he again worked in Munich; in 1894 he travelled with Ferenc Eisenhut to Egypt, where he painted several oriental-themed works. Beginning in 1889 he had regular exhibitions at the Palace of Art in Budapest. Characteristic of his early pictures is A Hadúr kardja ("The Warrior's Sword", 1890), a proto-Symbolist treatment of rural genre showing the influence of Jules Bastien-Lepage. After his return to Munich, Iványi-Grünwald painted a large-scale genre painting entitled Nihilisták sorsot húznak ("Nihilists Drawing Lots", 1893), a work as notable for its dramatic use of chiaroscuro as for its deeply felt subject-matter. In response to a state commission for the 1896 Millennium Exhibition in Budapest he produced an enormous academic history painting, Béla király visszatérése a tatárjárás után ("King Béla IV's Return following the Invasion Suffered at the Hands of the Tartars").

In 1896, together with Simon Hollósy and his circle (whom he had known at Hollósy's anti-academic painting school in Munich), Iványi-Grünwald arrived at Nagybánya (from 1918 Baia Mare, Romania) in order to concentrate on plein-air landscape painting; there, he became an important member of the Nagybánya artists' colony. Two years later he married Irén Bilcz, the daughter of a Greek Catholic priest, and settled in the city. After Hollósy's departure in 1901 he became one of the professors at the free painting academy there. At the Budapest National Salon in 1909 he won great acclaim for his paintings in a new style (Secessionism), which gained him the support he asked from the mayor of the small town of Kecskemét, who asked him to set up an artists' colony. Thus from 1911 to 1918 he led and worked at the Kecskemét artists' colony. After 1920 he lived in Pest, painting near Lake Balaton in summer. That year he was among the founders of the Szinyei Merse Pál Society. He received a number of important commissions, for instance painting a monumental canvas for the University of Debrecen Library. From 1928 he was president of the Szentendre Painters' Association. Along the years he had regular exhibitions in Budapest and displayed his paintings at the Fränkel Salon a number of times. He died in Budapest in 1940.

== Style ==
Iványi-Grünwald was keenly aware of the various currents of modernism that developed during his career. At first he was influenced by French naturalism (Ave Maria, 1891; Juhász és parasztasszony — "Shepherd and Peasant Woman", 1892). At Nagybánya, undoubtedly the most accomplished phase of his career, he focused on plein air and costume scenes (Holdkelte — "Moonrise", 1897; Bércek között — "Between Crags", 1901; Itatás — "Watering", 1902; Háromkirályok — "The Three Magi", 1903; Ruhaszárítás — "Drying Clothes", 1903). By this time his work had distanced itself from the influence of Bastien-Lepage to concentrate on the changing effects of atmosphere. He emphasized, for example, the mood produced by light at various times of the day and night, as in Evening by the Cattle Pen (1896), and used extremely bright colours, not entirely typical of the Nagybánya school as a whole, as with the brilliant greens of A völgyben ("In the Valley", ca. 1901). His subjects were taken from his immediate surroundings and the human figure is shown as an integral part of the landscape. Iványi-Grünwald also taught in Hollósy's Nagybánya school until he took up an award in 1905 that enabled him to spend a year in Rome. In 1906 he held an exhibition of his works in the Ernst Museum in Budapest, and this event effectively announced the end of his Nagybánya period, although he remained there a few more years.

A gradual change was brought about in Iványi-Grünwald's work by the influence of younger Hungarian painters returning from Paris and working in the style of the Fauves. More direct inspiration was provided by the exhibition of modern French Impressionist and Post-Impressionist painting held in Budapest in 1907; his paintings became more decorative and stylised, his outlines bolder, and his compositions based on flat shapes, as in Nagybányai táj a Gutinnal ("View of Nagybánya with the River Gutin", 1906–08). Decorative principles already dominated in the large panel of 1909 for the Révai Villa in Budapest, Tavasz ("Spring"), and Paul Gauguin in particular exerted an influence on his art (Római villa — "Villa in Rome", 1905; Cigánylányok a Lápos partján — "Gypsy Girls by the Banks of the Lápos", 1909). The major work of his Kecskemét phase is Kecskeméti piac télen ("Market of Kecskemét in Winter", 1912), of which he painted a number of versions. In style these scenes recalled Gauguin's Brittany paintings, with boldly outlined planes of deep colour. He was also able to paint monumental frescoes at the time (Fürdés után — "After Bathing", ca. 1914). After the mid-1910s his innovative period came to an end and he executed bucolic scenes and a series of pretty landscapes, for the most part vigorously painted and impressionistic in effect (Oxen on the Shore of Lake Balaton, 1920; the realistic Tájkép gémeskúttal — "Sweep-Pole Well", 1924; Balaton, 1936). In his last years, he painted pictures with movement typical of Baroque, then simple and realistic ones; his still lifes and pictures of Gypsies from this period were less significant.

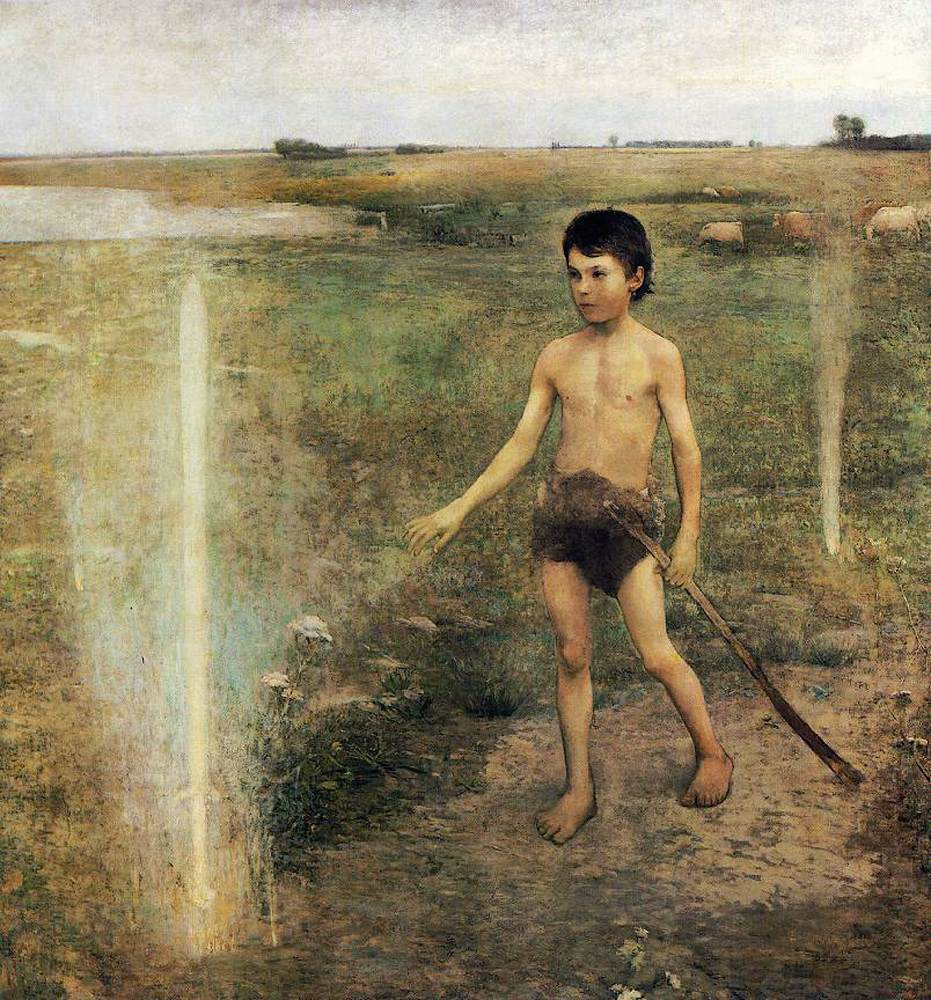
The Warrior's Sword (1890)

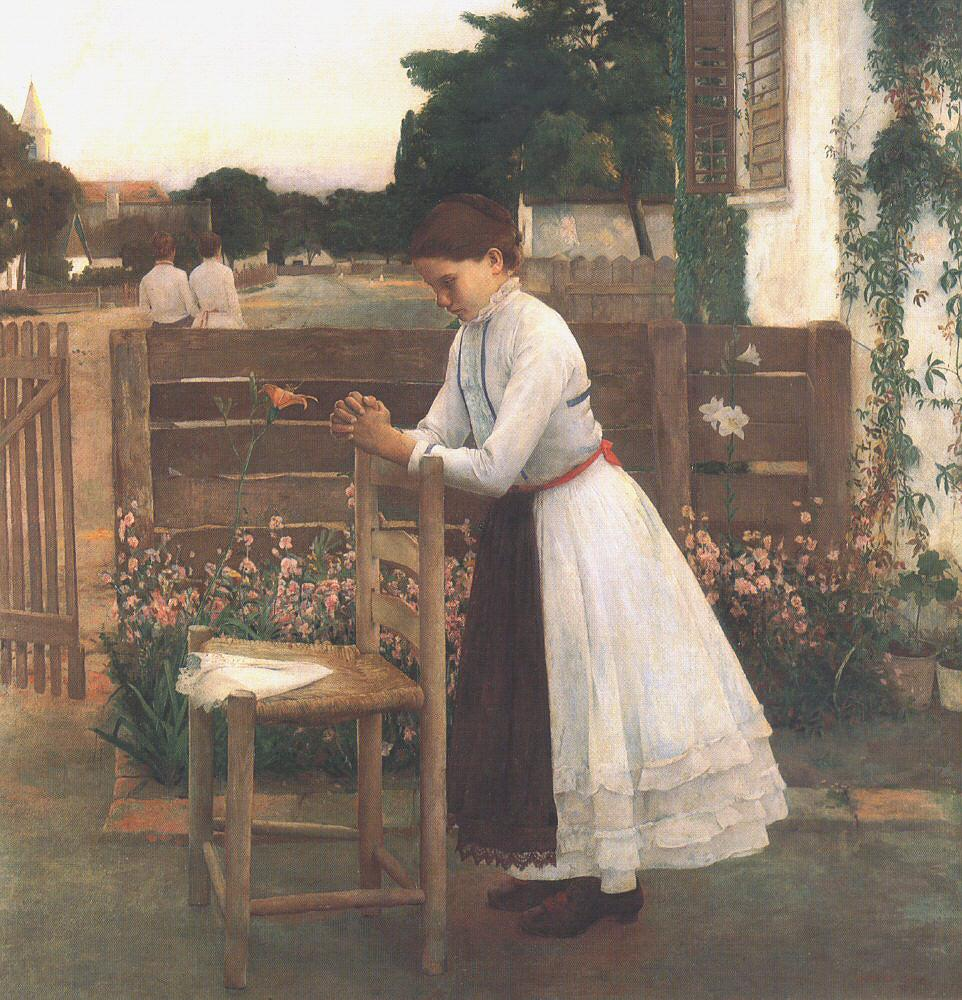
Ave Maria (1891)

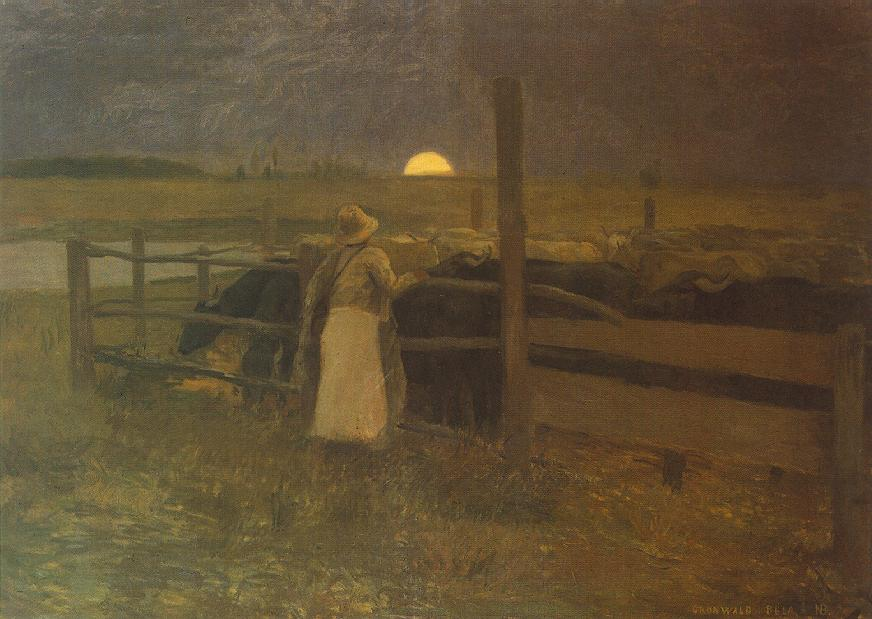
Moonrise (1897)

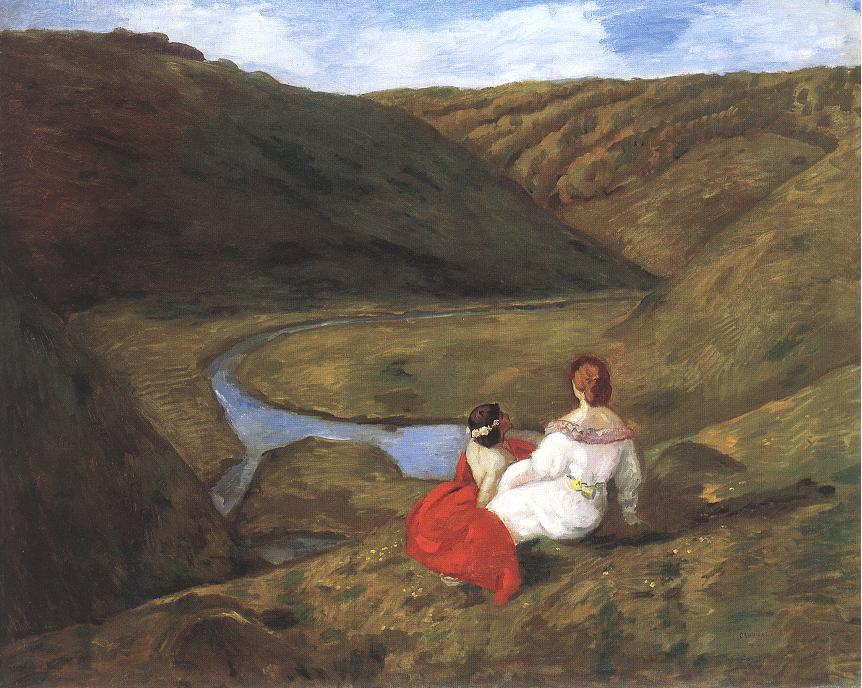
In the Valley (ca. 1901)

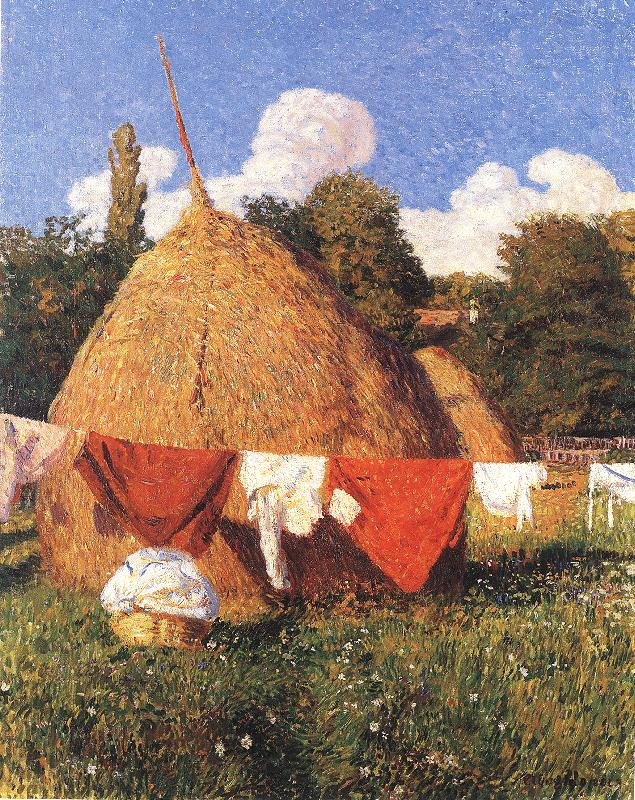
Drying Clothes (1903)

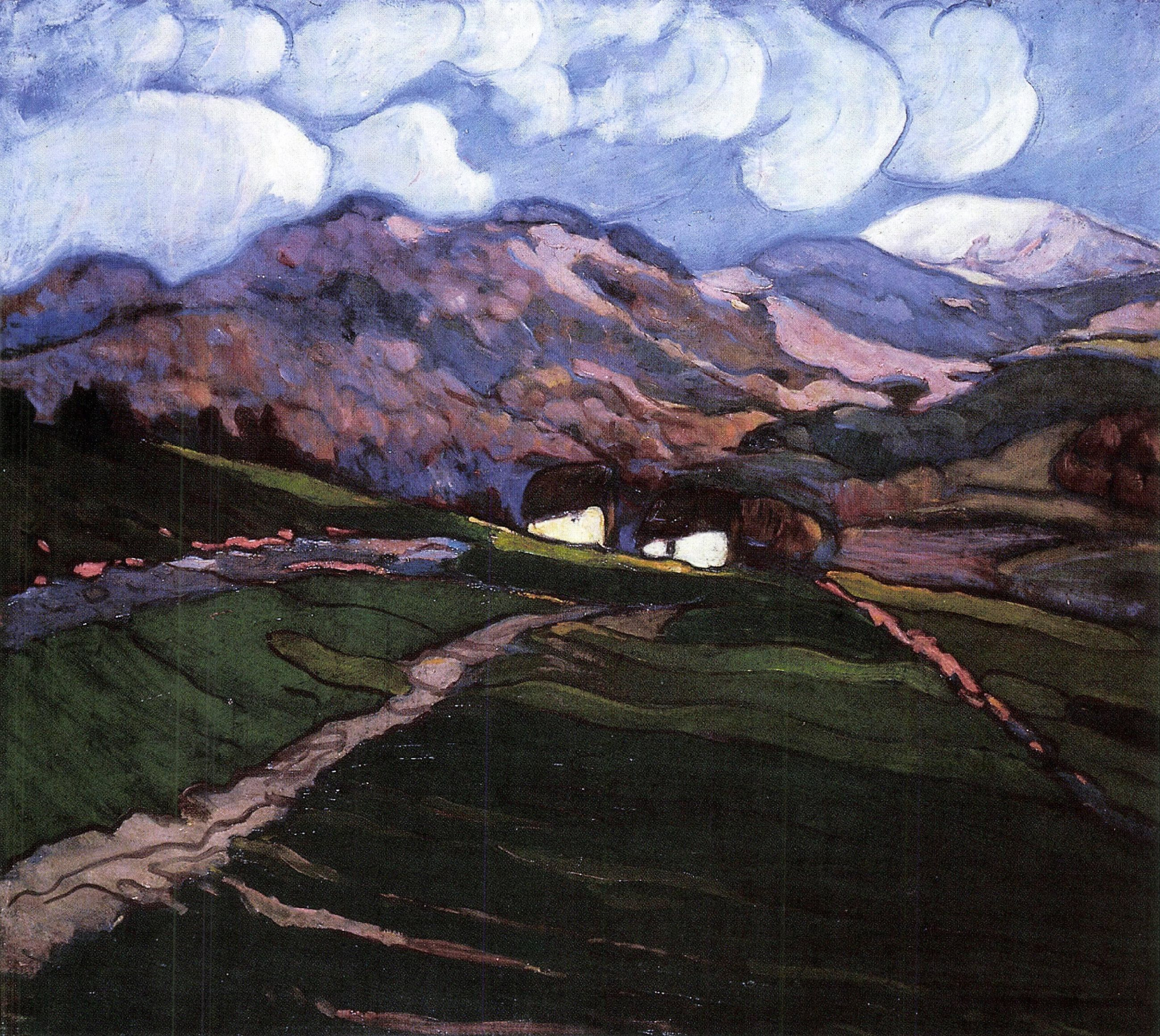
View of Nagybánya with the River Gutin (ca. 1906–08)

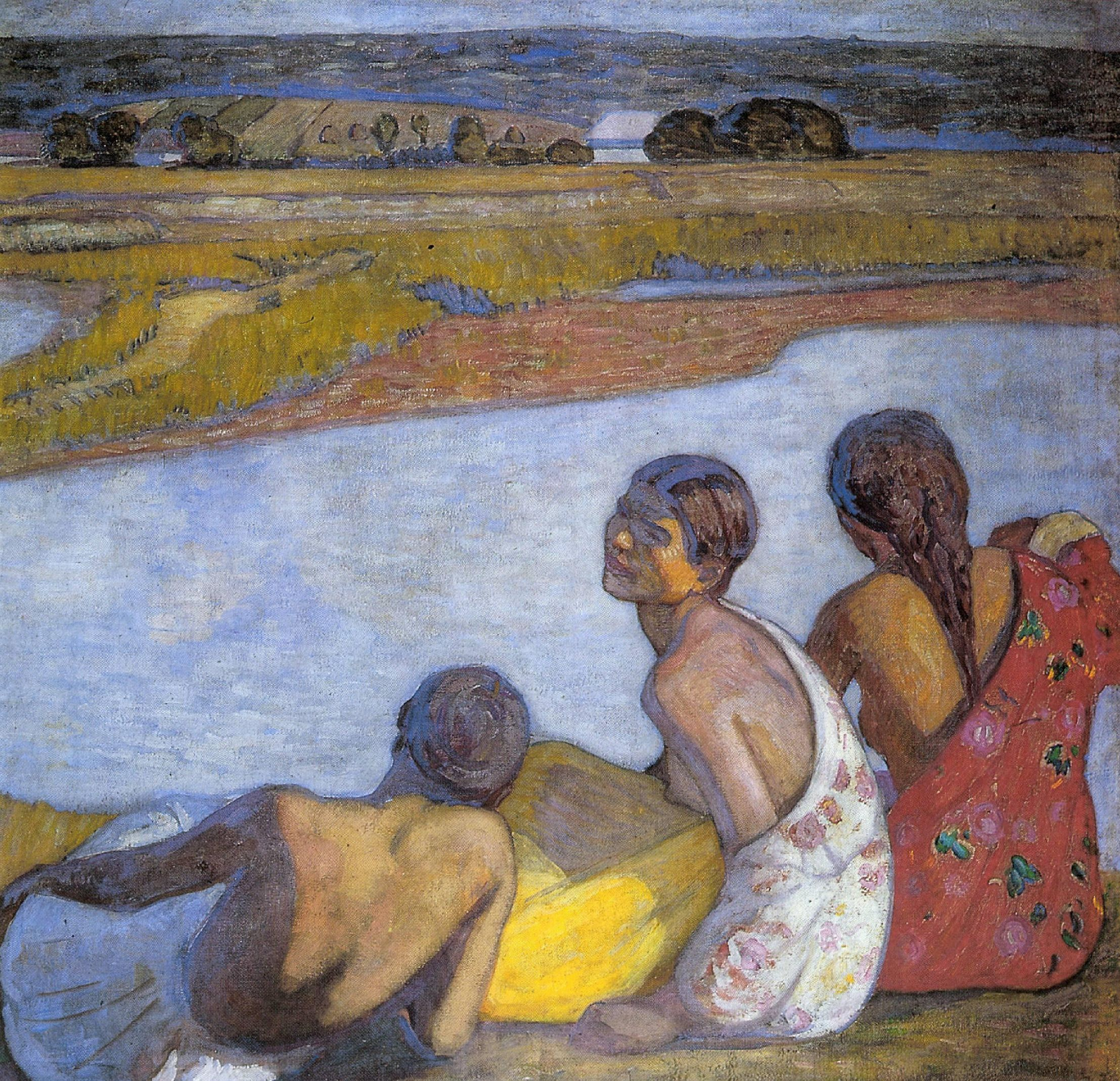
Gypsy Girls by the Banks of the Lápos (1909)

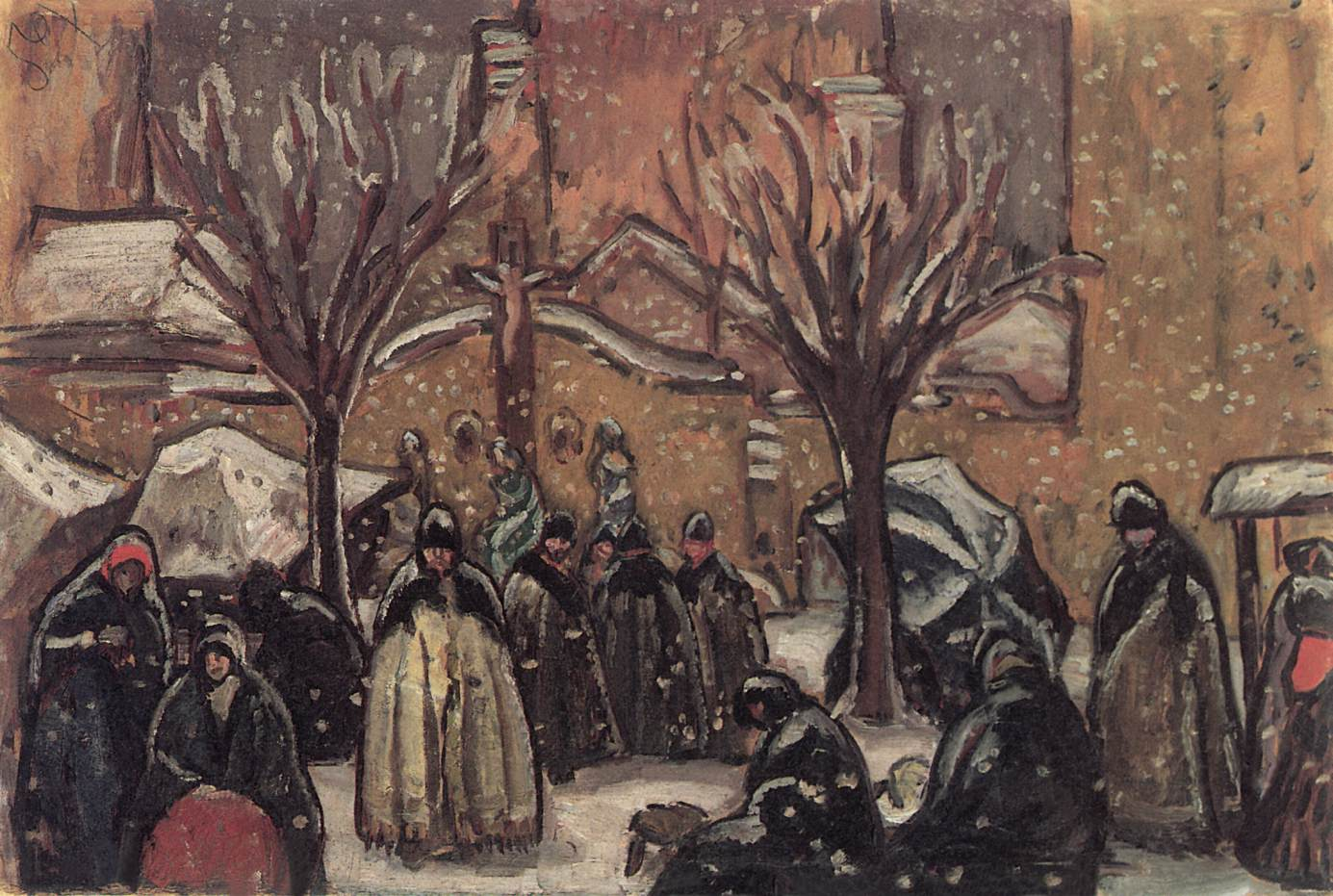
Market of Kecskemét in Winter (1912)
