= Andrási =

Andrási, sometimes spelled Andraši, Andrași or Andrássy, is a Hungarian surname. Notable people with the surname include:

- The House of Andrássy, a Hungarian noble family
- Aladár Andrássy (1827–1903), Hungarian soldier and politician
- Alexandru Andrași (born 1965), Romanian footballer
- Gyula Andrási (1927–1950), Hungarian sprint canoeist
- Gyula Andrássy (1823–1890), Prime Minister of Hungary and Foreign Minister of Austria-Hungary
- Gyula Andrássy the Younger (1860–1929), Hungarian politician
- István Andrássy (1650–1720), Hungarian general
- Károly Andrássy (1792–1845), Hungarian politician
- Katinka Andrássy (1892–1985), Hungarian noblewoman
- Klára Andrássy (1898–1941), Hungarian noblewoman and British agent
- Manó Andrássy (1821–1891), Hungarian painter, caricaturist, collector, traveler, and politician
- Tivadar Andrássy (1857–1905), Hungarian politician, painter, and art collector
