= Katinka =

- Pronunciation: /kəˈtɪŋkə/
- Gender: female

Origin
- Origin: Russian
- Meaning: pure
- Region of origin: Eastern European

Other names
- Related names: Katerina, Catherine

Katinka is a female name possibly originating in Hungary. It is the pet form of Katerina or Ekaterina, meaning "pure" and cognate to the English name Catherine. It may also refer to:

== People ==
- Katinka Andrássy (1892–1985), Hungarian noblewoman
- Katinka Barysch, German economist and financial commentator
- Katinka Bock (born 1976), German sculptor and visual artist
- Katinka Faragó (born 1936), Swedish film producer
- Katinka Heyns (born 1947), South African actor, director and filmmaker
- Katinka Hosszú (born 1989), Hungarian swimmer
- Katinka Kendeffy (1830–1896), Hungarian noblewoman
- Katinka Larsen (1905–1999), English diver
- Katinka Mann (1925–2022), American artist and sculptor
- Katinka Simonse (born 1979), Dutch artist professionally known as Tinkebell
- Katinka Szijj (born 1993), Hungarian sport shooter
- Sugár Katinka Battai (born 2003), Hungarian fencer

== Arts and entertainment ==
- Katinka (film), a 1988 film directed by Max von Sydow
- Katinka (operetta), a 1915 operetta by Otto Harbach and Rudolf Friml
- "Katinka" (song), a 1962 Dutch entry to the Eurovision Song Contest performed by De Spelbrekers
- Katinka (novel), an English translation of Ved Vejen, an 1886 novel written by Herman Bang
- Katinka Ingabogovinana, a character in the 2001 film Zoolander

== Animals ==
- Katinka's shrew (Crocidura katinka), found in Western Asia
- Loepa katinka (golden emperor moth), found in Southeast and South Asia

== Places ==
- Katinka Village, Wisconsin, an unincorporated town in Presque Isle, WI, United States
- Katinka, Croatia, a village near Lukač
