= The Red Countess =

1985 film

- Directed by: András Kovács
- Written by: Mihályné Károlyi; András Kovács
- Produced by: József Bajusz
- Starring: Juli Básti
- Cinematography: Miklós Bíró
- Release date: 7 March 1985
- Running time: 180 minutes
- Country: Hungary
- Language: Hungarian

The Red Countess (Hungarian: A vörös grófnő) is a 1985 Hungarian drama film directed by András Kovács. It was entered into the 14th Moscow International Film Festival.

== Cast ==
- Juli Básti as Katus, gróf Károlyi Mihályné, Andrássy Katinka
- Ferenc Bács as Gróf Károlyi Mihály
- Ferenc Kállai as Gróf Andrássy Gyula
- Hédi Temessy as Gróf Andrássy Gyuláné
- Klári Tolnay as Geraldin, Károlyi's foster mother
- Ildikó Molnár as Kája, Katus' sister
- Gábor Reviczky as Pallavichini György
- András Bálint as Jászi Oszkár
- Géza Tordy as Tisza István
- Teri Tordai as Madeleine, Károlyi's lover
- László Tahi Tóth as Kéry Pál
