= Klára Andrássy =

Hungarian noblewoman, later a Czechoslovak Communist and revolutionist

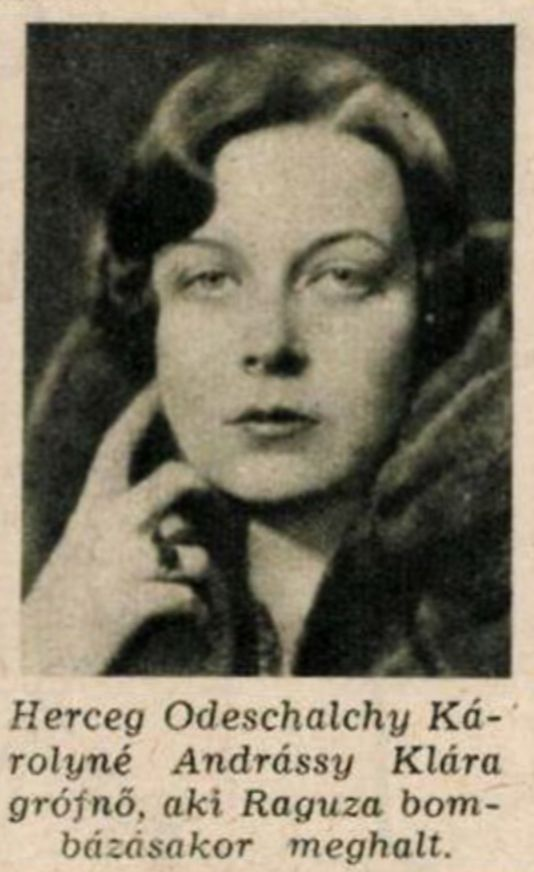
- Klára Andrássy, 1941
- Born: 18 January 1898; Budapest, Hungary
- Died: 12 April 1941 (aged 43); Dubrovnik, Independent State of Croatia
- Spouse: Károly Odescalchi
- Children: 1
- Parents: Tivadar Andrássy (father); Eleonóra Zichy (mother)
- Relatives: Gyula Andrássy (paternal grandfather); Katinka Kendeffy (paternal grandmother); Katinka Andrássy (sister)

Countess Klára Andrássy de Csíkszentkirály et Krasznahorka (later Princess Caja Odescalchi) was a Hungarian noblewoman, social and political activist and British agent between autumn 1939 and April 1941.

== Life ==
Born in Budapest in 1898, Klára was the youngest granddaughter of Count Gyula Andrássy, the statesman. She had three elder sisters: Ilona, Borbála and Katalin. Count Tivadar Andrássy, her father, died young in 1905. In 1909, her widowed mother, Eleonora Zichy, married her brother-in-law Count Gyula Andrássy the Younger, who became step father as well as uncle, to Klára.

Klára married Prince Károly Odescalchi in October 1921 at the Batthyány manor at Polgárdi, the home of her aunt Ilona Batthyány Andrássy. Their honeymoon at Dénesfa (home of her elder sister Ilona Cziraky Andrássy) was interrupted by the arrival of King Charles in the second attempt at the restoration of the monarchy. This resulted in a short prison term under Regent Horthy for her step-father Gyula the younger, as he had been proposed as Foreign Minister in the restored government of the King.

Klára had one son Pál, born in 1923, and divorced Károly in the late 1920s. As a leading Legitimist (supporter of the restoration of the Hungarian monarchy) she was a close supporter of her uncle and step-father. Klára served as president of the Hungarian Women's Holy Crown Association until her resignation in 1937. She was also active in the support of women's issues.

In 1938, Klára visited Spain for 2 months to cover the Civil War for Danish and French newspapers. The following year, Klára was asked to become Deputy President of the Hungarian Polish Committee for Refugee Care by József Antall, State Secretary at the Ministry of the Interior. She was very active in the support of this Committee with Countess Erzsébet Szapáry and Countess Daisy Károlyi.

Klára also worked closely with British Minister to Hungary, Owen O’Malley, in assisting the escape of Polish servicemen through Hungary. It is estimated that in total up to 100,000 Polish servicemen escaped from the Nazis though Hungary. Some stayed, others travelled on to Yugoslavia. Several thousand Polish Jewish refugees also found sanctuary in Hungary.

Klara offered space in the Andrássy Palace in Budapest, to the Polish Health Services, the Polish Red Cross in Hungary and the Hungarian Polish Committee for Refugee Care, free of charge.

In April 1941, Horthy allowed Hitler to send the German Army through Hungary to attack Yugoslavia. O’Malley warned Klára that she was on the Gestapo hit list and risked imprisonment or worse if she remained in Hungary and advised that she should leave immediately. O’Malley organised for her to travel to Yugoslavia with British Naval Attache Captain Larkin in order to meet a submarine at Kotor. Klara obtained an exit permit from Horthy, which he signed personally. When they arrived in Dubrovnik, Klara was out walking in the center when two Italian Air Force planes dropped a stick of bombs in the only raid of the War. She was fatally injured and is buried there.

== Honours ==
- Virtus et Fraternitas Medal, Poland (2026)
