= Red Countess =

The Red Countess may refer to:

- Daisy Greville, Countess of Warwick (1861–1938), British socialite, philanthropist and socialist
- Constance Markievicz (1868–1927), Irish politician, suffragette and socialist
- Hermynia Zur Mühlen (1883–1951), Austrian writer and translator
- Katinka Andrássy (1892–1985), Hungarian noblewoman and wife of Mihály Károlyi
  - The Red Countess, a 1985 Hungarian film, based on the life of Katinka Andrássy
- Marion Dönhoff (1909–2002), German journalist active in the anti-Nazi resistance
