= Etelka Szapáry =

Hungarian noblewoman (1798–1876)

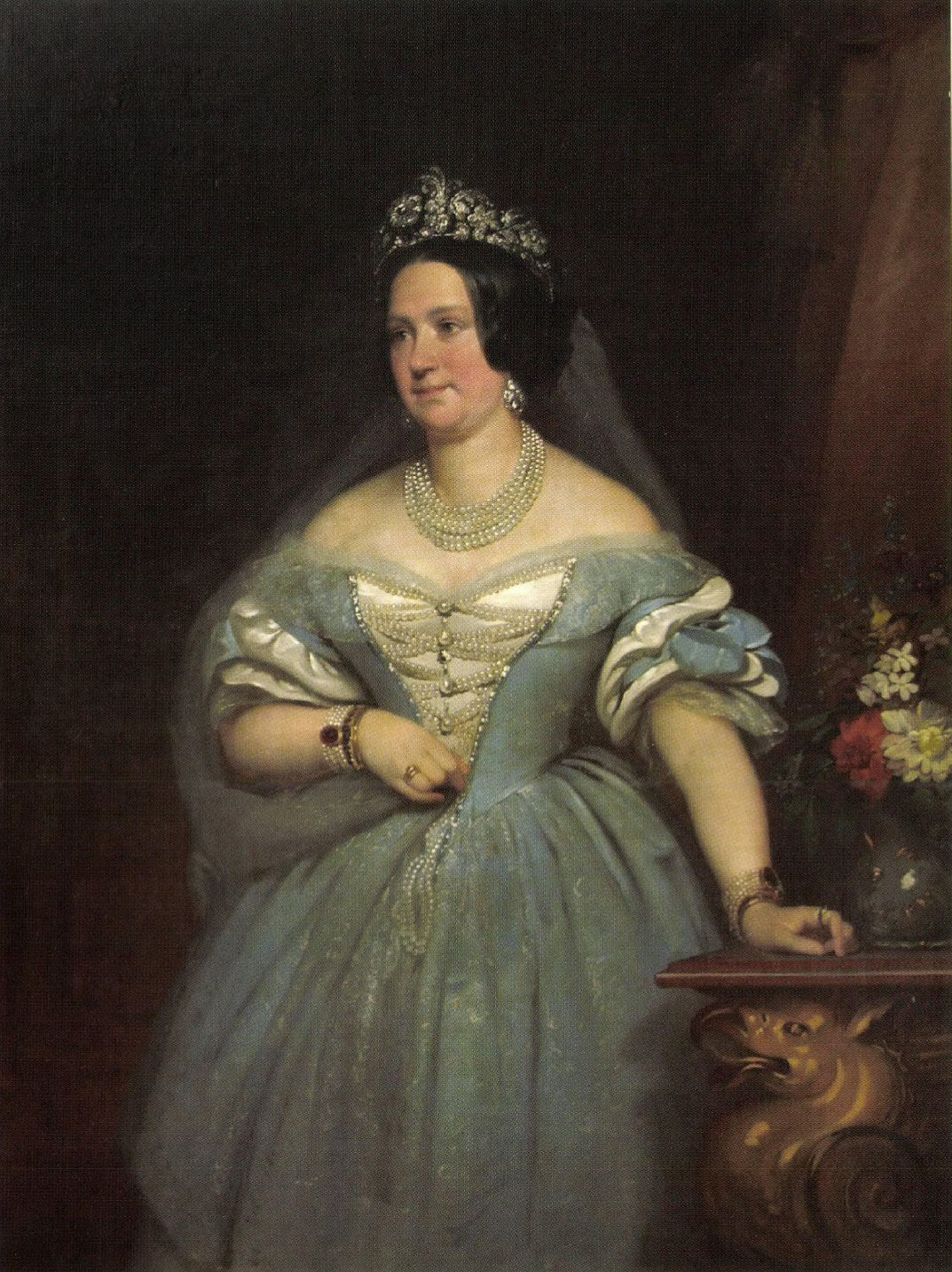
- Portrait by Miklós Barabás
- Born: 26 September 1798
- Died: 10 November 1876 (aged 78); Szőlőske, Austria-Hungary
- Spouse: Károly Andrássy de Csíkszentkirály és Krasznahorkai
- Parent(s): 4, including Manó, Gyula, and Aladár

Countess Etelka (Adelhaid) Szapáry de Szapár, Muraszombat et Széchy-Sziget (26 September 1798 – 10 November 1876) was a Hungarian noblewoman and a landowner.

== Early life ==
Born as a member of an old noble House of Szapáry, she was the second daughter of Count Péter Szápáry de Muraszombath, Széchysziget et Szapár (1766–1827) and his wife, Countess Júlia Csáky de Körösszeg et Adorján (1770–1827).

== Biography ==
Etelka Szapáry possessed the Letenye castle, which was built by her father. The mansion became the property of the Andrássy family as her dowry. Today, it operates as a community center.

She is buried in the Andrássy Mausoleum in Tőketerebes (Trebišov). Her sarcophagus rests in the crypt.

== Family ==
She married Count Károly Andrássy de Csíkszentkirály és Krasznahorkai in Betlér, 1809. They had four children:

- Countess Kornélia (1820–1836)
- Count Manó (1821–1891): married to Countess Gabriella Pálffy de Erdőd (1833–1914)
- Count Gyula (1823–1890): Prime Minister of Hungary, Minister of Foreign Affairs of Austria-Hungary, married to Countess Katinka Kendeffy de Malomvíz
- Count Aladár (1827–1903): married Baroness Leontina Wenckheim de Wenckheim (1841–1921).

== Sources ==
- Alexandra Schmal (ed.): Levelek az Andrássy-házból (1864–1869). General Press Kiadó, Budapest, 2007.
