= Tivadar Andrássy =

Hungarian politician (1857-1905)

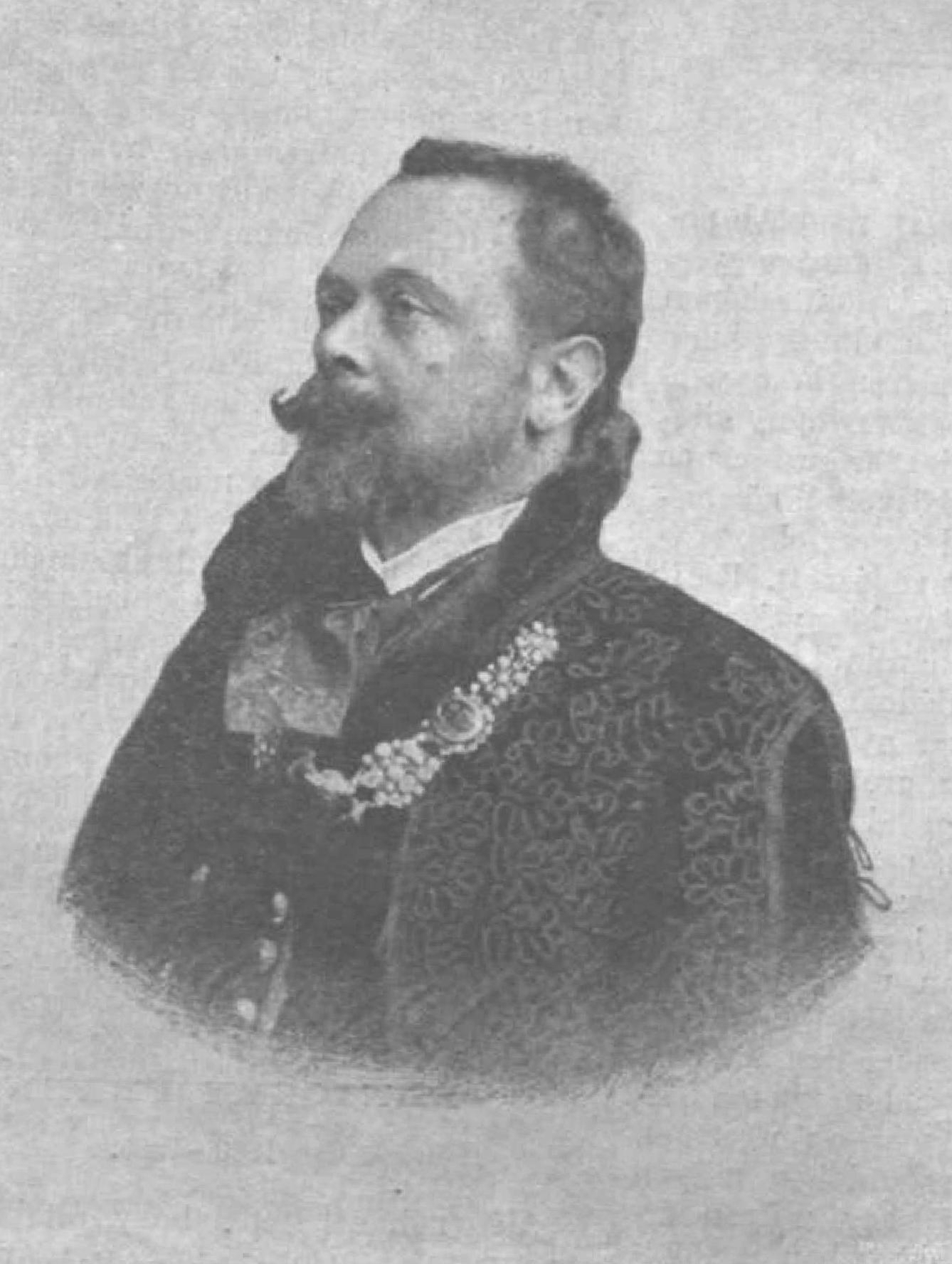
- Born: 10 July 1857; Paris, Second French Empire
- Died: 13 May 1905 (aged 47); Budapest, Austria-Hungary
- Occupations: politician painter nobleman
- Political party: Liberal Party (1881–1898, 1899–1904)
- Spouse: Eleonóra Zichy (m. 1885–1905)
- Children: Ilona; Borbála; Katinka; Klára
- Parent(s): Gyula Andrássy; Katinka Kendeffy

Count Tivadar Andrássy de Csíkszentkirály et Krasznahorka (10 July 1857 – 13 May 1905) was a Hungarian politician, Member of Parliament, painter, and art collector. He served as a member of the Hungarian Academy of Sciences, the National Museum, the Metropolitan Board of Public Works, and the House of Representatives economics committee.

== Biography ==
Andrássy was born in 1857 in Paris. His father was Gyula Count Andrássy de Csíkszentkirály et Krasznahorka (1823–1890), a Hungarian statesman, who served as Prime Minister of Hungary (1867–1871) and Foreign Minister of Austria-Hungary (1871–1879). His mother was Countess Katinka Kendeffy de Malomvíz (1830–1896). Andrássy had two younger siblings, a sister, Ilona (1858–1952), who married Lajos Batthyány, Governor of Flume, and a brother, Gyula Andrássy the Younger (1860–1929), a politician. He was educated in Vienna and Budapest.

In 1881, he was elected Member of Parliament for Tőketerebes district. He was President of the House of Representatives Committee on conflict of interest, but resigned circa 1897. An art collector, he was also a painter, mainly painting landscapes. In Trebišov, he financially supported the arts. Beginning in 1890, he served as president of the Hungarian University of Fine Arts. In 1907, two years after his death, the Fine Arts Society exhibited 80 of his works.

== Personal life ==
He married Countess Eleonóra Zichy de Zich et Vásonkeő on 24 June 1885; they had four daughters:

- Ilona (1886–1967)
- Borbála (1890–1968)
- Katalin (1892–1985); wife of Count Mihály Károlyi
- Klára (1898–1941), Communist partisan

== Death ==
Andrássy died in Budapest in 1905. Four years after her husband's death, his widow married her former brother in law, Gyula the Younger.
