= Aladár Andrássy =

Hungarian soldier and politician (1827–1903)

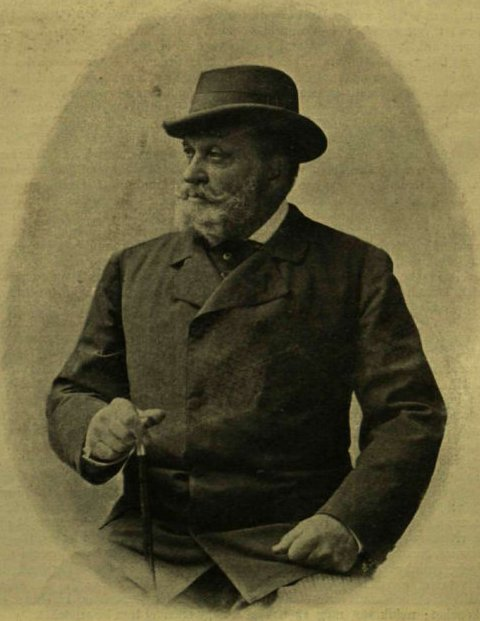
- Born: February 17, 1827; Pest, Kingdom of Hungary
- Died: April 2, 1903 (aged 76); Budapest, Austria-Hungary
- Occupations: soldier, politician
- Spouse: Baroness Leontina Wenckheim de Wenckheim
- Parents: Count Károly Andrássy (father); Countess Etelka Szapáry (mother)

Count Aladár Andrássy de Csíkszentkirály et Krasznahorka (February 17, 1827 – April 2, 1903) was a Hungarian soldier and politician.

He participated in the Hungarian Revolution of 1848, serving as aide-de-camp to Lieutenant General Józef Bem. After the defeat he lived in emigration. He returned in 1865. He became Count (comes) of Gömör és Kis-Hont County. He was a member of the House of Magnates. Andrássy was awarded the Order of the Golden Fleece.

== Family ==
His parents were Count Károly Andrássy, a politician and Countess Etelka Szapáry. His brothers were Gyula Andrássy Sr., Prime Minister of Hungary, Minister of Foreign Affairs of Austria-Hungary and painter and politician Manó Andrássy. He married Baroness Leontina Wenckheim de Wenckheim (1841–1921).
