= Gyula Batthyány =

Hungarian painter and graphic artist

- Born: Gyula Batthyány; 10 May 1887; Ikervár
- Died: 20 January 1959 (aged 71); Budapest, Hungary
- Resting place: Farkasréti Cemetery
- Education: Hungarian Academy of Fine Arts; Académie Julian
- Parent(s): Lajos Batthyány; Ilona Andrássy

Gyula Batthyány (Ikervár, 10 May 1887 – Budapest, 20 January 1959) was a Hungarian painter and graphic artist whose works are in the collection of the Hungarian National Gallery as well as other museums around the world.

== Early life ==
His father is Count Lajos Batthyány, governor of Fiume, member of parliament, and his mother is Count Ilona Andrássy. He is the great-grandson of Count Lajos Batthyány, the first Hungarian Prime Minister.

In 1890, when he was barely three years old, he made his first drawing. He began his education at the Hungarian Academy of Fine Arts studying under János Vaszary, later going to Munich in 1907 to work with Angelo Jank. He studied at The Académie Julian in Paris from 1910 to 1913 where he became friends with Léon Bakst. Only a year after Paris, his paintings would be exhibited at the Ernst Museum in Budapest.

== Career ==
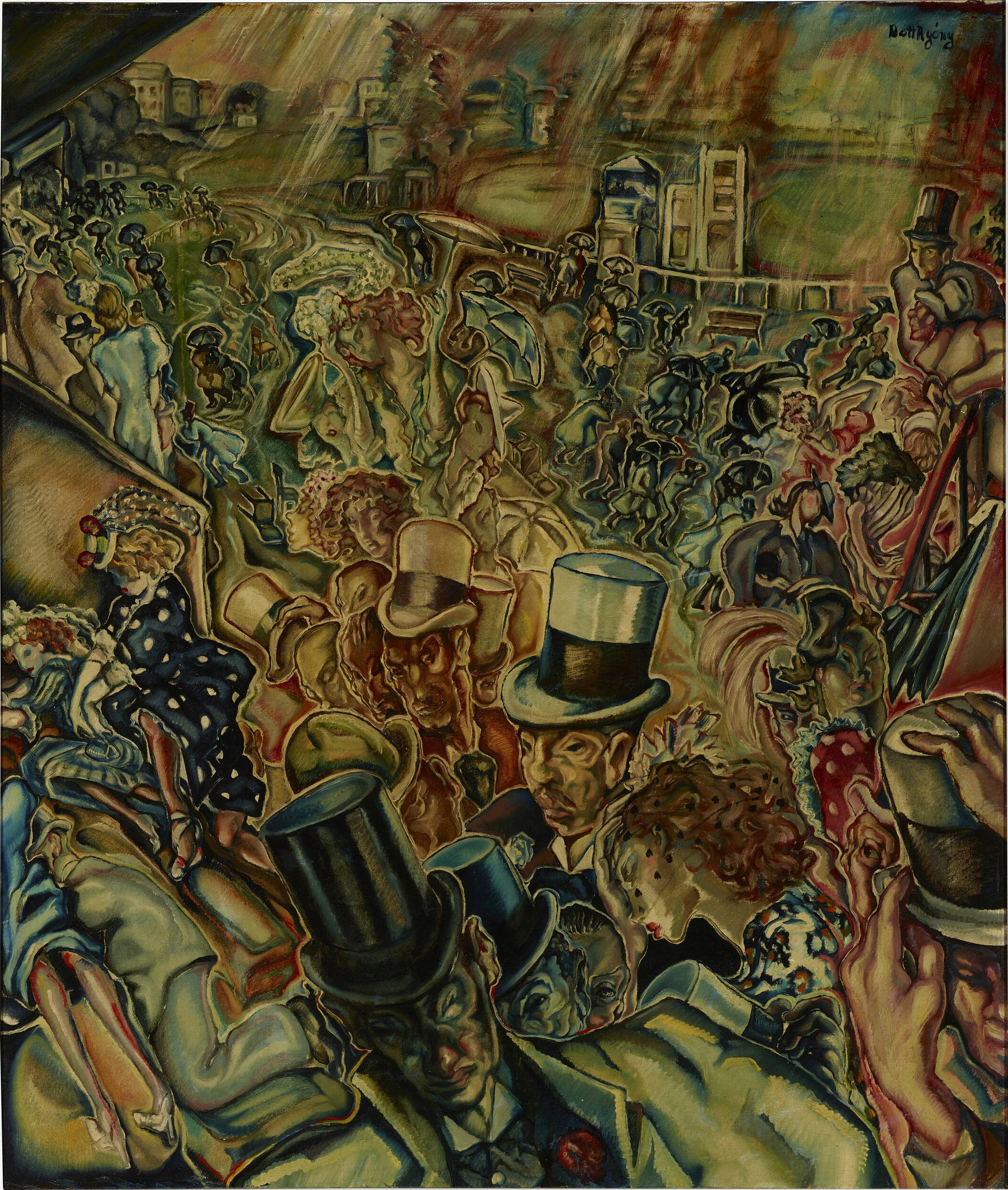
"Top Hats" by Batthyány

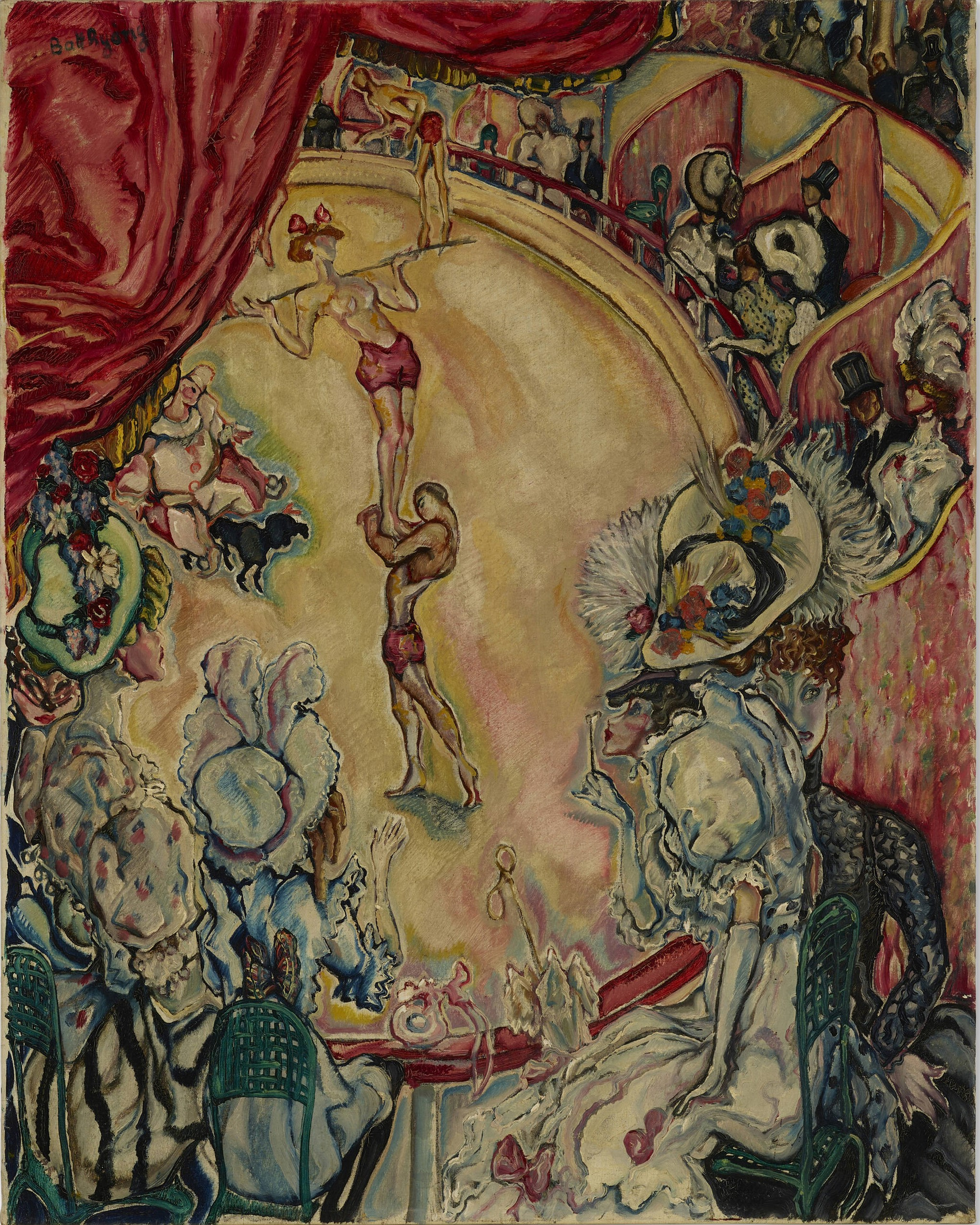
"Circus" by Batthyány

In 1914 he had an exhibition together with Beck Ö. Fülöp in the Ernst Museum. His works were regularly displayed in the Art Gallery and the National Salon between 1921 and 1938. In 1922, he established an artist colony in Bicske, where he lived at that time. From the 1920s, he started designing theater decorations under the influence of Sergei Diaghilev's set designer, Leonid Bakszt.

=== Other art ===
In addition to painting, he was a well-known theater set and costume designer, and also created numerous book illustrations. His series of Hungarian historical drawings were reproduced and published in an album. As a graphic artist, he also illustrated the works of Ferenc Herczeg and Cécile Tormay. His painting can be related to late Art Nouveau, his pictures are characterized by gracefully elongated figures and satirical representation. He often chose glittering, aristocratic social scenes as the subject of his paintings. He uniquely portrayed luxurious pleasure girls, elegant gentlemen, gangsters, the posing, theatrical, hollow characters of the aristocratic milieu full of sultry eroticism. In addition to Daumier, his elongated figures also remind us of El Greco's manneristic undulating depictions of people. His works are often dream-like, energetically swirling organic forms form an integral part of their design world. Its decorativeness shows affinities with the illustration of surrealism and Art Deco.

== Personal life ==
A known opponent of national socialists, he was sentenced to eight years in prison for political reasons in 1952. He spent five years in prison in Márianosztra, and his property was confiscated. After his release, he lived in retirement in Polgárdi in the apartment of his former officer until his death. His more significant works are kept by the Hungarian National Gallery.

== Awards ==
- 1916: silver medal, San Francisco
- 1930: silver medal, Barcelona
- 1934: gold medal, Paris
- 1937: bronze medal at the World Exhibition in Paris
