= Juli Básti =

Hungarian actress (born 1957)

- Born: Júlia Básti; 10 August 1957 (age 69); Budapest, Hungary
- Occupation: Actress
- Years active: 1980–present

Juli Básti (born Júlia Básti; 10 August 1957) is a Hungarian actress. She has appeared in more than 40 films and television shows since 1980. She won the award for Best Actress at the 14th Moscow International Film Festival for her role in The Red Countess (1985).

== Selected filmography ==
Year	Title	Role	Notes
1985	The Red Countess	Katus, gróf Károlyi Mihályné, Andrássy Katinka	
1987	Miss Arizona	Mitzi Rozsnyai	
1989	Jesus Christ's Horoscope	Juli	
1992	The Summer Guest	Kocsmárosnő	
2015	Mom and Other Loonies in the Family	Berta Gardó / Rozál Mille	
