= Vlachovo =

Village and municipality in Slovakia

Vlachovo Oláhpatak
- Municipality

- Flag

- Location of Vlachovo in the Košice Region Location of Vlachovo in Slovakia
- Coordinates: 48.78°N 20.42°E
- Country: Slovakia
- Region: Košice Region
- District: Rožňava District
- First mentioned: 1247

Area
  - Total: 37.33 km^{2} (14.41 sq mi)
- Elevation: 403 m (1,322 ft)

Population (2025)
  - Total: 756
- Time zone: UTC+1 (CET)
  - Summer (DST): UTC+2 (CEST)
- Postal code: 492 4
- Area code: +421 58
- Vehicle registration plate (until 2022): RV
- Website: www.vlachovo.sk

Vlachovo (Hungarian: Oláhpatak, German: Lambsdorf, Lampertsdorf) is a village and municipality in the Rožňava District in the Košice Region of middle-eastern Slovakia. The name indicates an aboriginal Valachian population, confirmed as both Vlah in Slavonic and Oláh in Hungarian mean Romanian; the origin is confirmed even by the Germanic name, Lambsdorf (Lambs' Village), given the main occupation of the Middle Ages Romanians.

== History ==
In historical records the village was first mentioned in 1427 as Alahpathaka, but until the end of the 14th century it was also referred to as Lampertfalva. In 1597 it was referred to as Oláhpataka alias Lampertsdorf. Since then it was called Oláhpatak, and rarely Oláh Pataka. Slovaks referred to the commune also as Vlachov or Wlachowo. When it became part of Czechoslovakia, its name became Vlachovo. Before the establishment of independent Czechoslovakia in 1918, Vlachovo was part of Gömör and Kishont County within the Kingdom of Hungary. From 1939 to 1945, it was part of the Slovak Republic.

== Geography ==
The municipality lies at an altitude of 403 metres (1,322 ft) and covers an area of 37.33 km^{2} (14.41 sq mi) (2025).

== Population ==
Population statistic (10 years)
Year	1995	2005	2015	2025
Count	910	916	839	756
Difference		+0.65%	−8.40%	−9.89%

Population statistic
Year	2024	2025
Count	764	756
Difference		−1.04%

It has a population of 756 people (31 December 2025).

=== Ethnicity ===
Census 2021 (1+%)
Ethnicity	Number	Fraction
Slovak	769	97.96%
Not found out	14	1.78%
Other	10	1.27%
Total	785	

In year 2021 was 785 people by ethnicity 769 as Slovak, 14 as Not found out, 10 as Other, 3 as Russian, 3 as Hungarian, 1 as Czech and 1 as Rusyn.

Note on population: The difference values of population numbers in the table "Population statistic" and in the sections "Ethnicity" & "Religion" is caused by the use of various statistical methods.

=== Religion ===
Census 2021 (1+%)
Religion	Number	Fraction
Evangelical Church	458	58.34%
None	207	26.37%
Roman Catholic Church	75	9.55%
Not found out	18	2.29%
Total	785	

In year 2021 was 785 people by religion 458 from Evangelical Church, 207 from None, 75 from Roman Catholic Church, 18 from Not found out, 6 from Greek Catholic Church, 6 from United Methodist Church, 5 from Paganism and natural spirituality, 4 from Other and not ascertained christian church, 3 from Ad hoc movements, 2 from Calvinist Church and 1 from Eastern Orthodox Church.

== Culture ==
The village has a public library, a gymnasium and a swimming pool.

The village is also home to a historical blast furnace and smelter building, a branch exhibit of the Slovak Technical Museum in Košice.

== Notable people ==
- Gyula Andrássy, (1823 in Oláhpatak – 1890), Hungarian statesman, Prime Minister of Hungary (1867–1871) and Foreign Minister of Austria-Hungary (1871–1879).
