= József Kristóffy =

Hungarian politician (1857–1928)

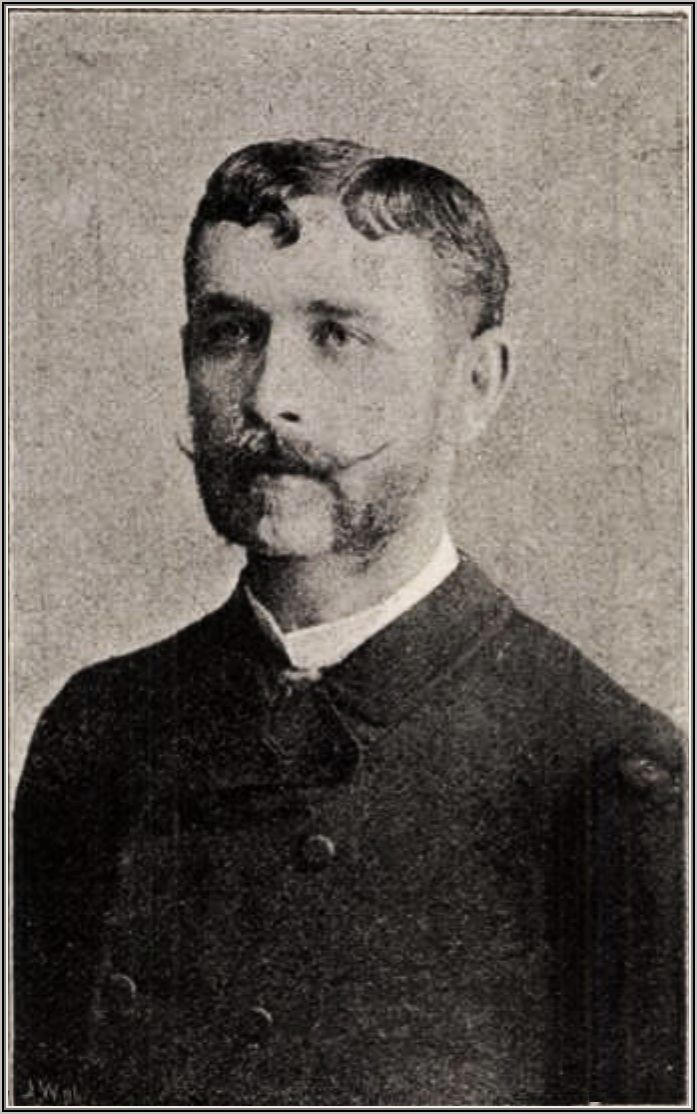

Minister of the Interior of Hungary
- In office 18 June 1905 – 8 April 1906
- Preceded by: István Tisza
- Succeeded by: Gyula Andrássy the Younger

Personal details
- Born: 17 September 1857; Makó, Hungary
- Died: 29 March 1928 (aged 70); Budapest, Hungary
- Political party: Liberal Party, Party of National Work
- Profession: politician

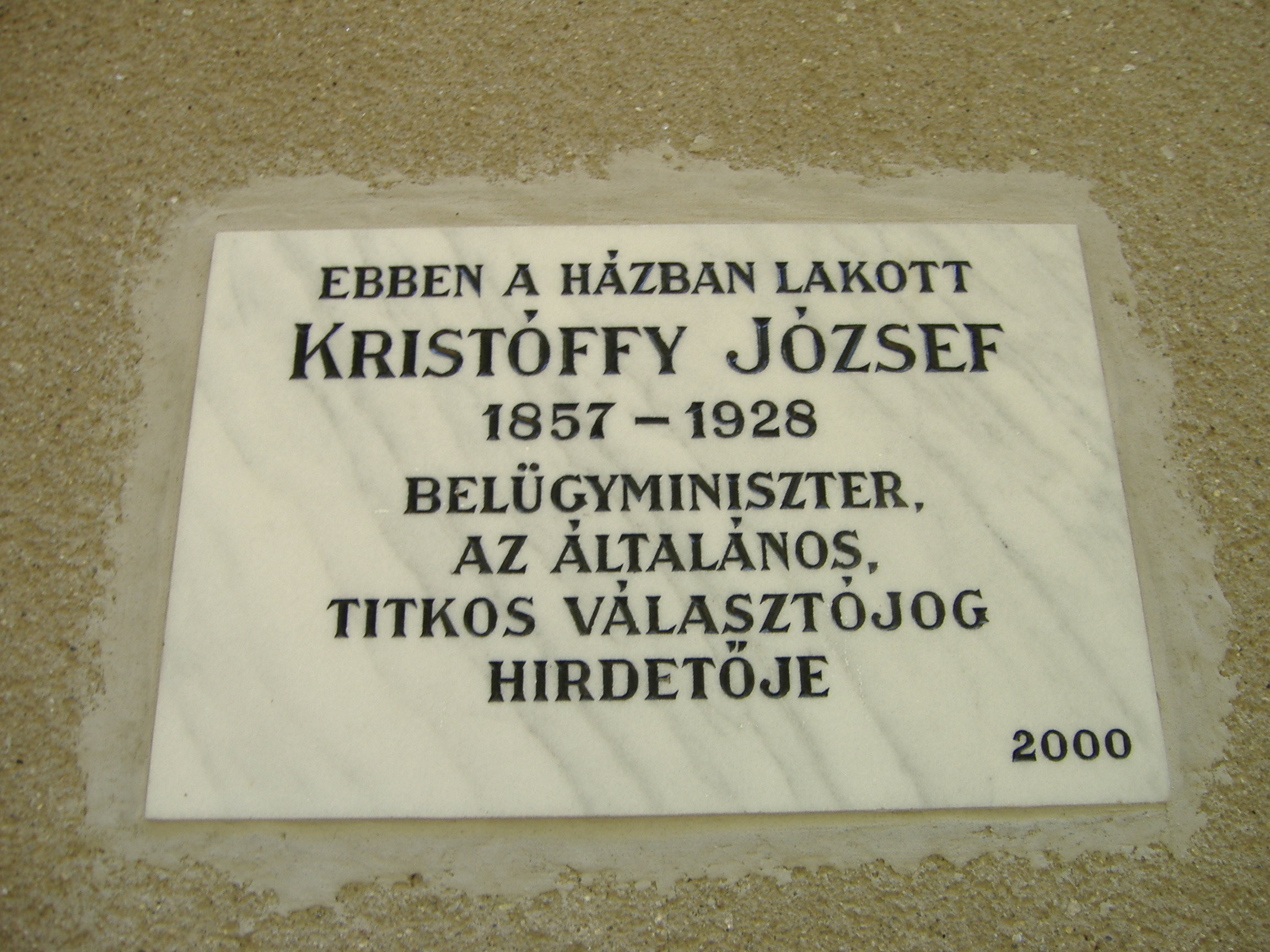
Memorial tablet of Kristóffy (Makó, birthplace)

József Kristóffy (17 September 1857 – 29 March 1928) was a Hungarian politician, who served as Interior Minister for a year (1905–1906) in Géza Fejérváry's cabinet. Universal suffrage appeared as part of this cabinet's program. Kristóffy wanted to make a coalition with the Social-Democrat Party, which was the main opposition party in Hungary during the first years of the 20th century ("Kristóffy-Garami Pact"), but failed to do so.

Political offices
Preceded by István Tisza	Minister of the Interior; 1905–1906	Succeeded by Gyula Andrássy the Younger
