= Lajos Batthyány (governor) =

Hungarian politician (1860–1951)

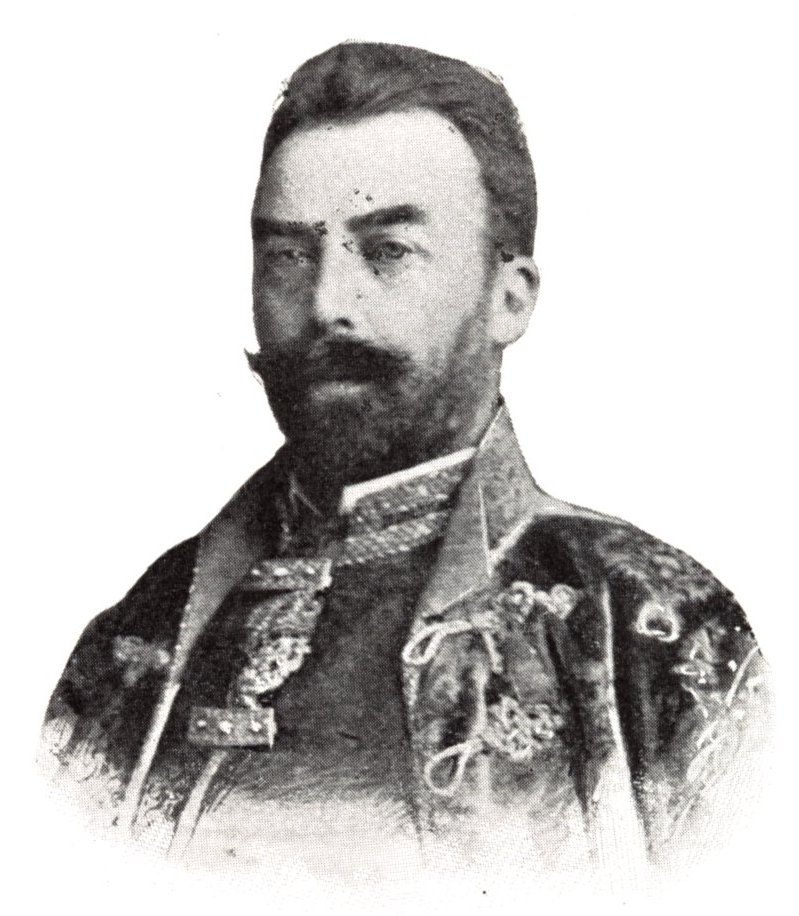

Governor of Fiume
- In office 6 March 1892 – 2 October 1896
- Preceded by: Ágost Zichy
- Succeeded by: Rezső Abele

Personal details
- Born: 27 July 1860 Egyed, Kingdom of Hungary
- Died: 27 December 1951 (aged 91) Polgárdi, People's Republic of Hungary
- Spouse: Ilona Andrássy
- Profession: politician

Count Lajos Batthyány de Németújvár (Egyed, 27 July 1860 - Polgárdi, 27 December 1951) was the main county head of Győr (Latin: comes (supremus), Hungarian: főispán), Governor (kormányzó) of Fiume, and Győr parliamentary representative.

== Early life ==
He was the eldest son of count Géza Batthyány von Németújvár (1838–1900) and Countess Emma Batthyány (1837–1902). Her father was the first prime-minister of Hungary Count Lajos Batthyány von Németújvár (1807–1849).

== Biography ==
Batthyány attended law studies at Budapest, Berlin and Paris, pursuing a diplomatic career, but later abandoned this plan. He married Gyula Andrássy's only daughter, Ilona Andrássy in 1882. When Károly Khuen-Héderváry, after serving as Győr county and city supreme count (főispán), was appointed Banus in Croatia on 1 December 1883, the King appointed Batthyány supreme count of Győr. Batthyány proved to be very successful in managing Győr by fostering industrial development. The bourgeoisie, therefore, highly respected him and he enjoyed popular support.

For this reason the Hungarian government in 1892 appointed him Governor of Fiume. After the resignation of the mayor of Fiume Giovanni de Ciotta, Batthyány resigned in turn in autumn 1896. In the same year Batthyány became a parliamentary representative of the city of Győr. In recognition of his qualities and achievements he became imperial and royal chamberlain, and royal intimate counselor.

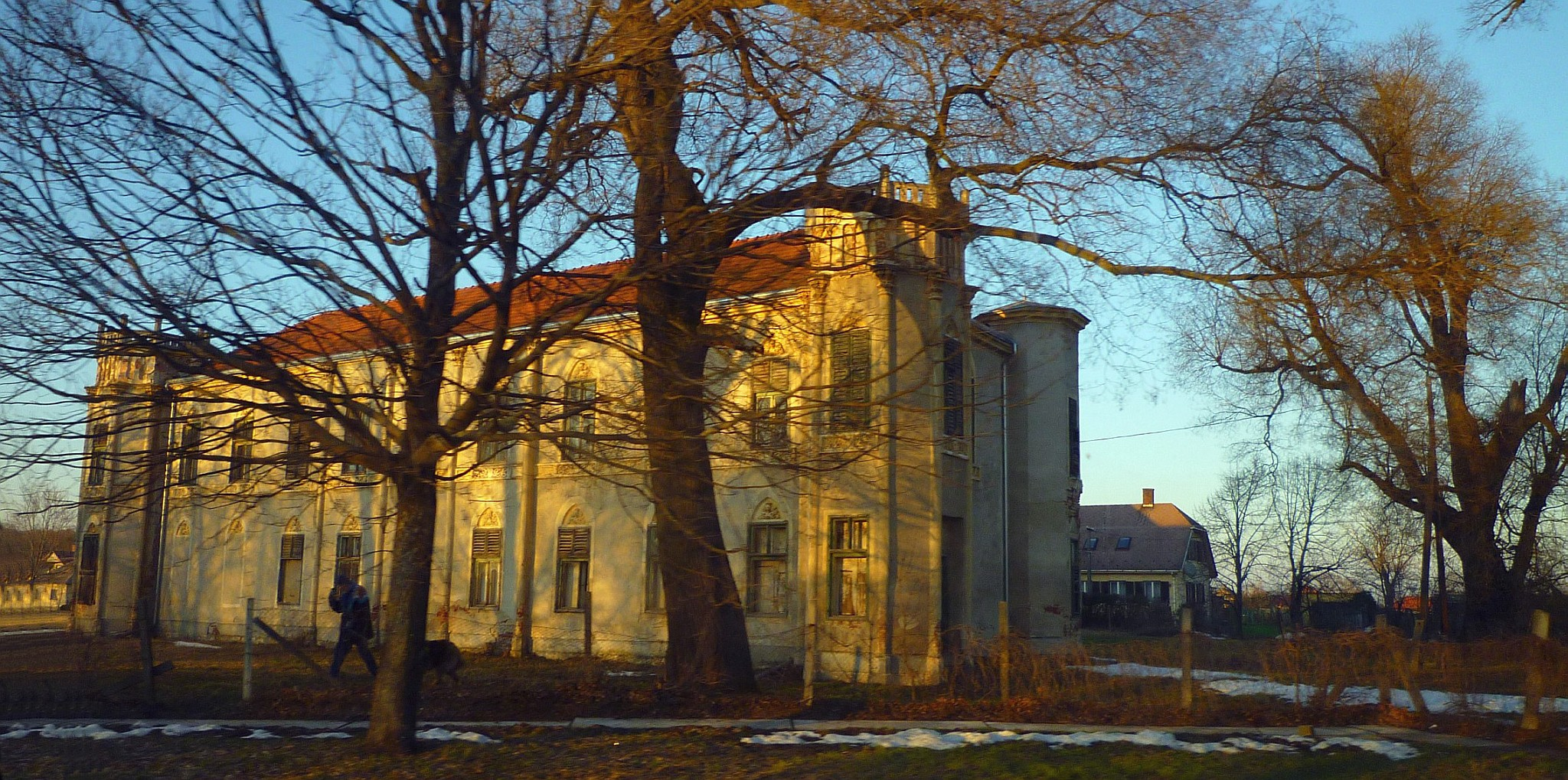
Castle Egyed (Hungary) where he was born

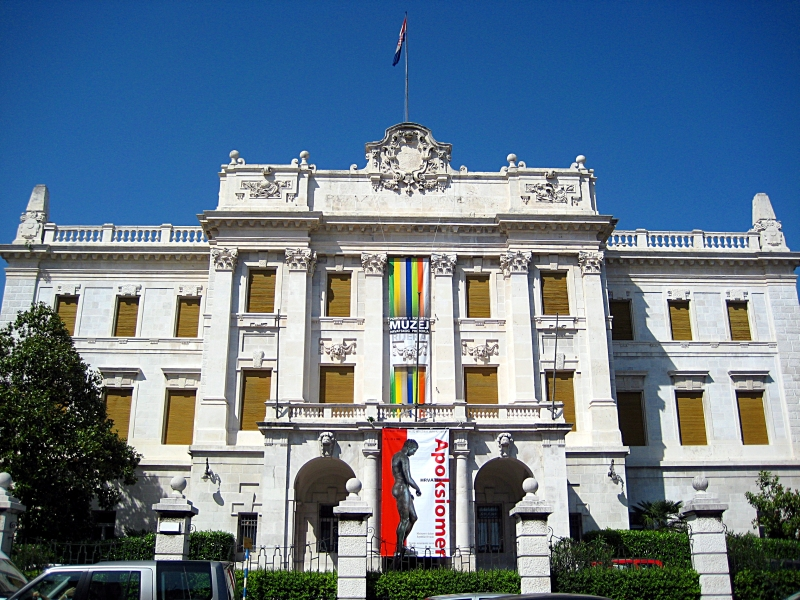
Governors palace in Fiume, today in Croatia

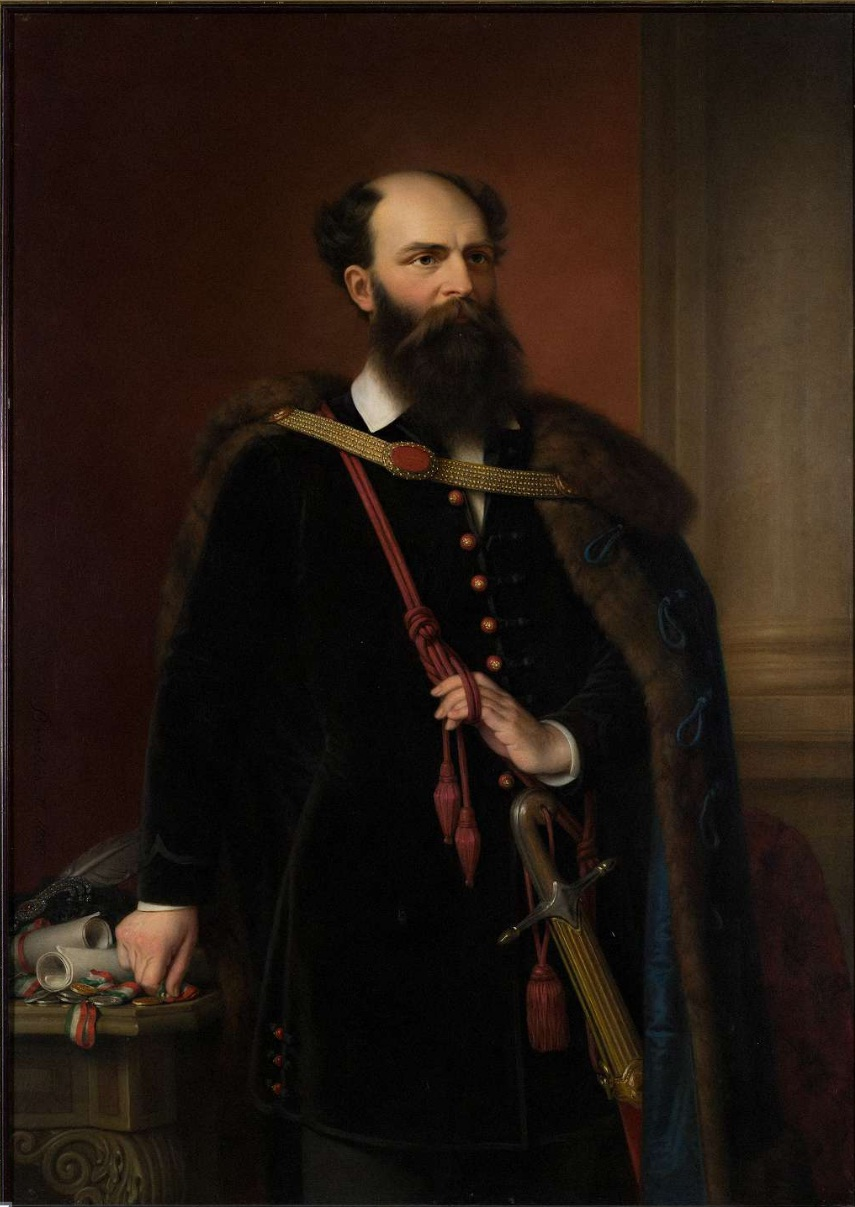
His father-in-law Lajos Batthyány von Németújvár (1807–1849)

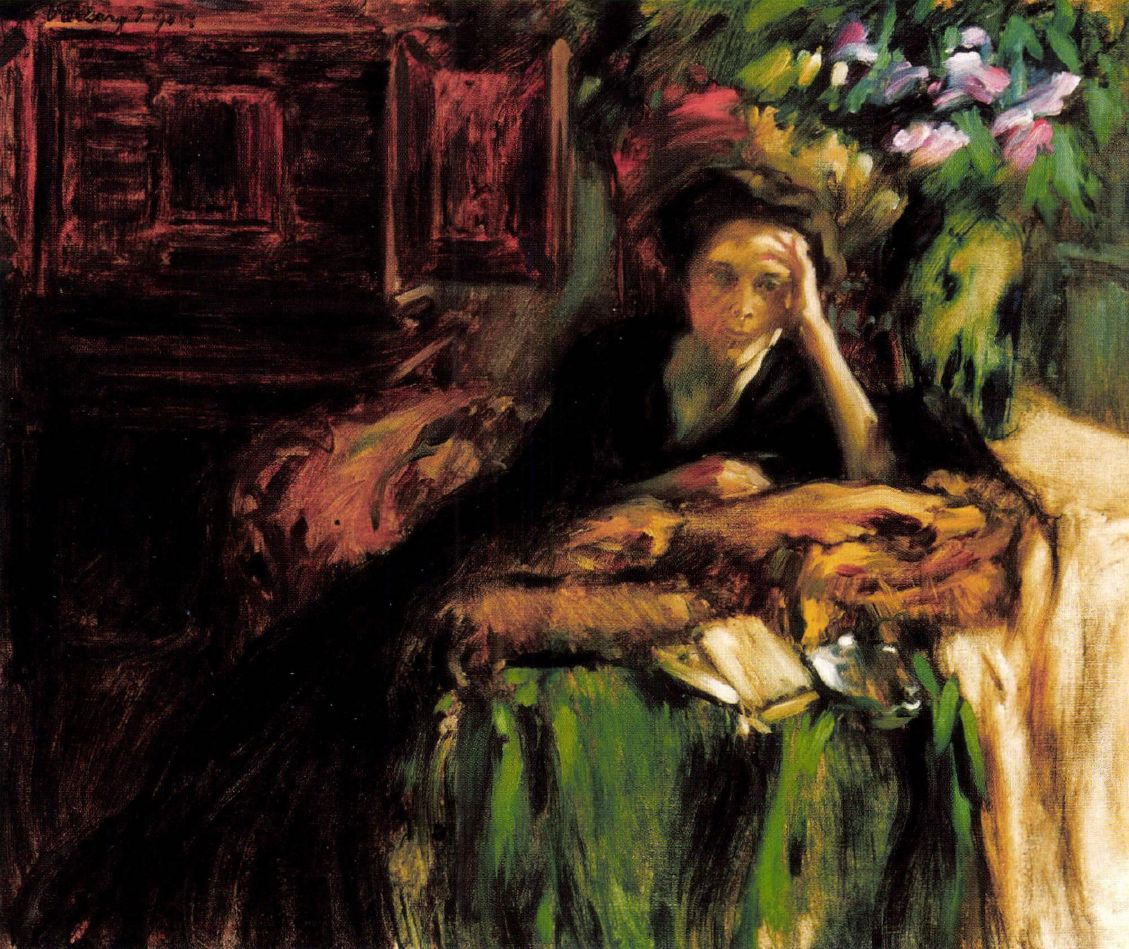
His wife Ilona Andrássy (1858–1952)

== See also ==
- Governors and Heads of State of Fiume
