= Egyed =

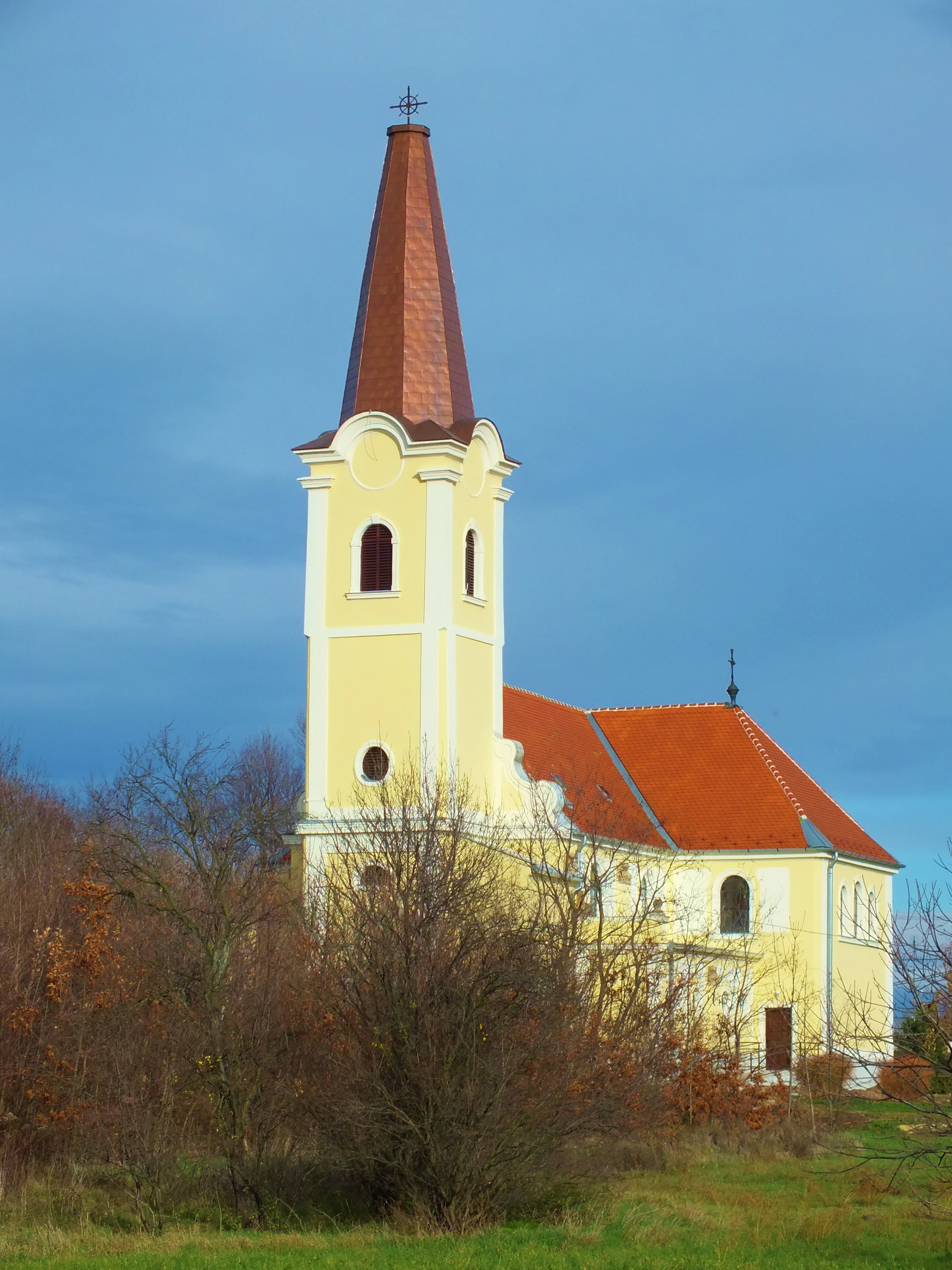

- Flag Coat of arms

- Location of Győr-Moson-Sopron county in Hungary

- Location of Egyed
- Coordinates: 47.51899°N 17.33873°E
- Country: Hungary
- County: Győr-Moson-Sopron

Area
  - Total: 13.43 km^{2} (5.19 sq mi)

Population (2004)
  - Total: 587
  - Density: 43.7/km^{2} (113/sq mi)
- Time zone: UTC+1 (CET)
  - Summer (DST): UTC+2 (CEST)
- Postal code: 9314
- Area code: 96

For people with the surname, see Egyed (surname).

Egyed is a village in Győr-Moson-Sopron county, Hungary.
