= Károly Andrássy =

Hungarian politician

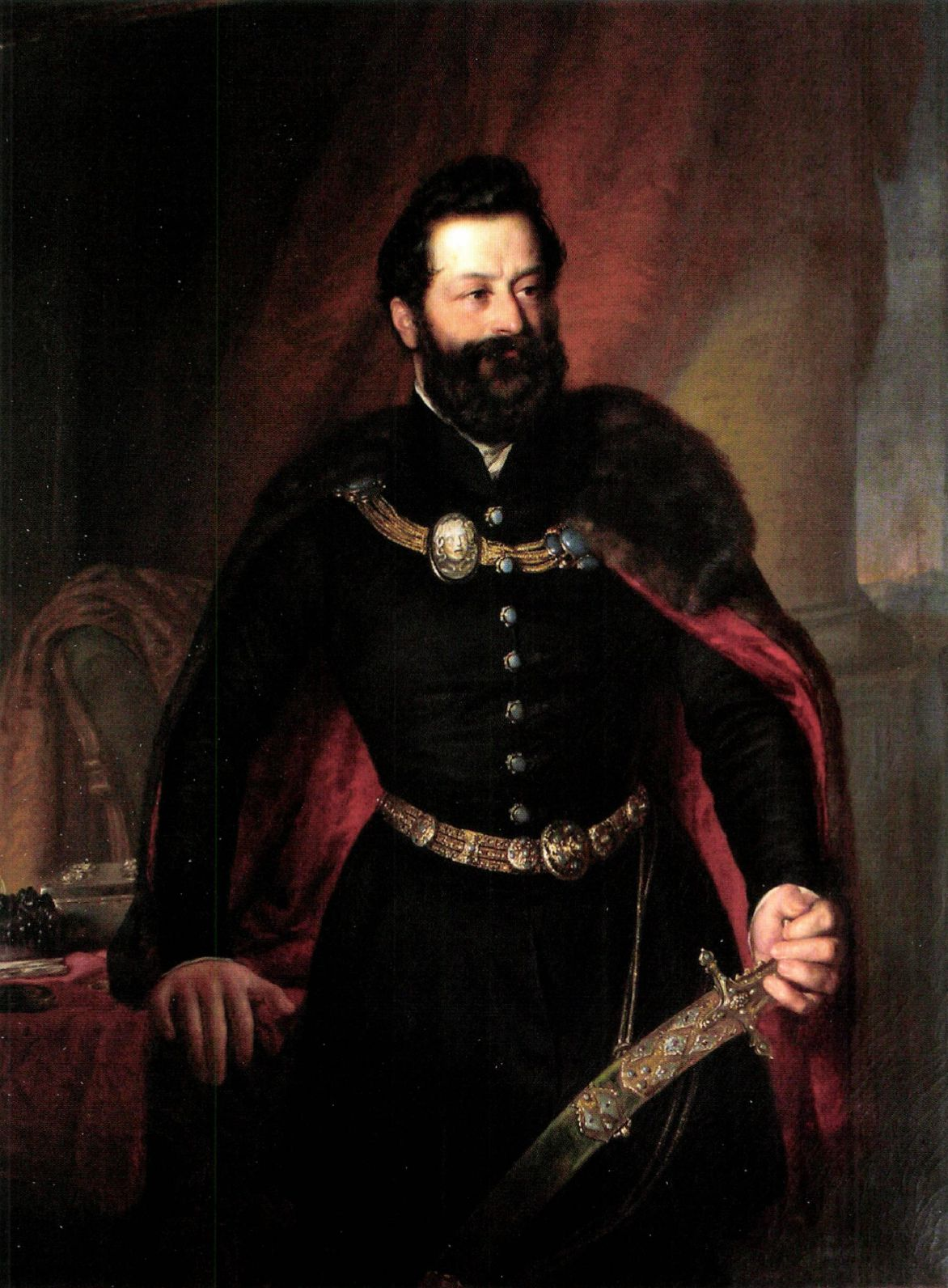
- Born: 29 February 1792; Rozsnyó, Kingdom of Hungary
- Died: 22 August 1845 (aged 53); Brussels, Belgium
- Occupation: Politician
- Political party: Opposition Party
- Spouse: Etelka Szapáry
- Children: 4, including Manó, Gyula, and Aladár

Count Károly Andrássy de Csíkszentkirály et Krasznahorka (29 February 1792 – 22 August 1845) was a Hungarian politician, who served as emissary to Gömör és Kis-Hont County in the Diets of 1839 and 1844.

== Background ==
His parents were Count József Andrássy, a military officer, and Countess Walburga Csáky de Körösszeg et Adorján. He married Countess Etelka Szapáry de Szapár, Muraszombat et Széchy-Sziget in Betlér, 1809.

They had four children:

- Kornélia (1820–1836)
- Manó (1821–1891): his wife was Countess Gabriella Pálffy de Erdőd (1833–1914)
- Gyula (1823–1890): Prime Minister of Hungary, Minister of Foreign Affairs of Austria-Hungary; his wife was Countess Katinka Kendeffy de Malomvíz
- Aladár (1827–1903): his wife was Baroness Leontina Wenckheim de Wenckheim (1841–1921).

== Works ==
- Umrisse einer möglichen Reform in Ungarn. Im Geiste des Justemilieu. 2. Abth. London, 1833. (von A... jegygyel. 2. kiadása Altenburgban jelent meg ugyanazon évben névtelenül.)
- Az utak készitéséről. Rozsnyó, 1837.
