= Ilona Andrássy =

Hungarian noblewoman (1858–1952)

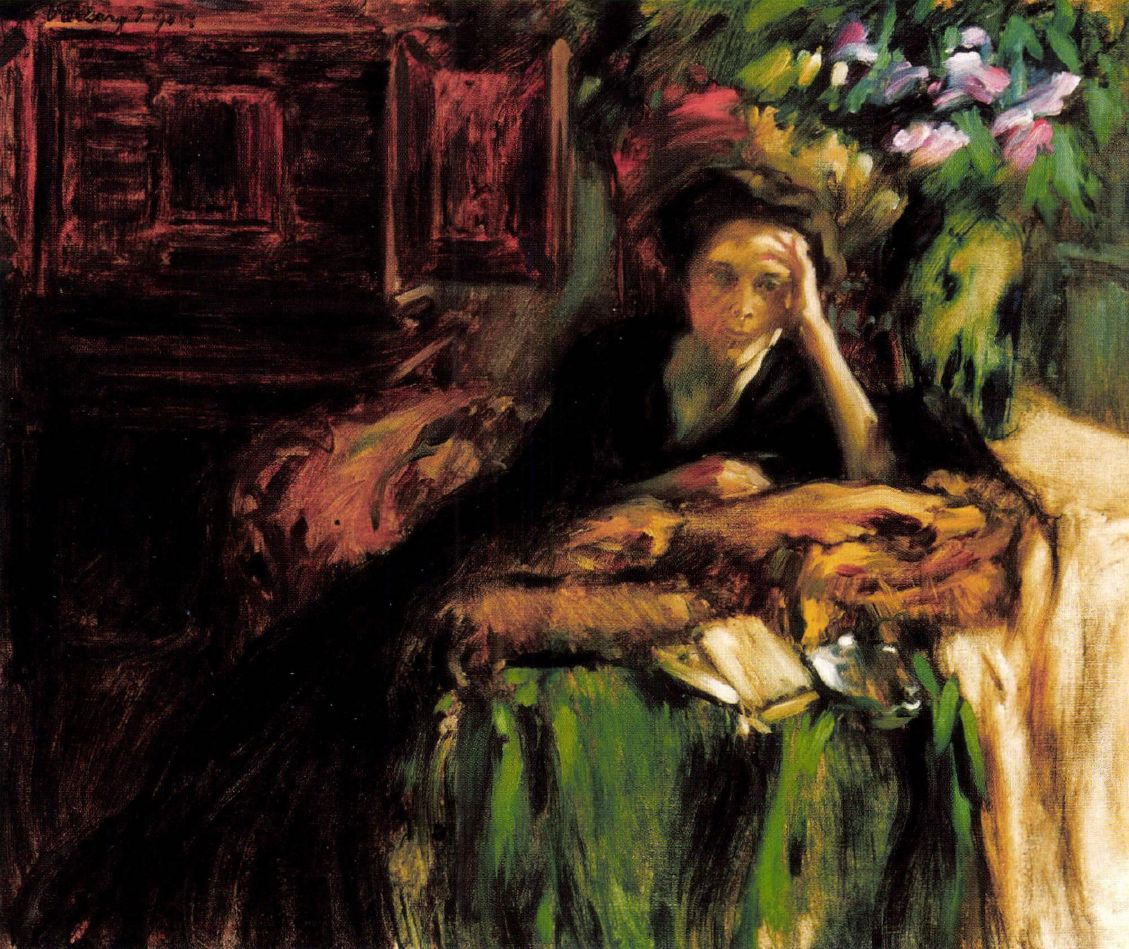
- Portrait by János Vaszary (1905)
- Born: 21 May 1858; Petronell-Carnuntum, Austrian Empire
- Died: 2 April 1952 (aged 93); Polgárdi, Hungary
- Spouse: Lajos Batthyány
- Parent(s): Gyula Andrássy; Katinka Kendeffy

Countess Ilona Andrássy de Csíkszentkirály et Krasznahorka (21 May 1858 – 2 April 1952) was a Hungarian noblewoman, wife of Count Lajos Batthyány de Németújvár (1860–1951) who served as Governor of Fiume.

== Early life ==
Her parents were Count Gyula Andrássy and his wife Countess Katinka Kendeffy. She had three siblings including Tivadar and Gyula Jr.
