= Katinka Szijj =

Hungarian sport shooter

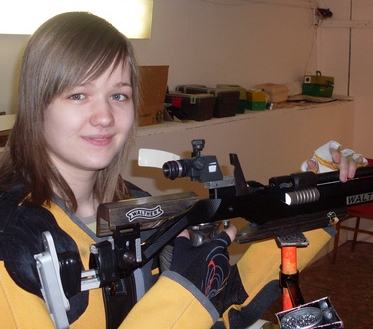

Personal information
- Nickname(s): Katus, Tunci
- Nationality: Hungarian
- Born: February 25, 1993 (age 32); Komárom, Hungary

Sport
- Sport: Shooting
- Event: 10m air rifle
- Club: Komáromi VSE

Katinka Szijj (born February 25, 1993) is a female shooter from Hungary.

She got acquainted with shooting by chance in 2004 on a local sport day. She and her family soon realized that she had a talent for the sport, and so she applied for membership at the local club, Komáromi VSE, along with her younger sister, Kamilla, who also became a shooter. She got on the podium on her first national championship with a 3rd place in 2006. Since then, she has won several titles. She participated in the 2010 Summer Youth Olympics. She qualified for the event in Meråker Municipality, Norway, on March 10, 2010, with a result of 497,1 points.
