= Egyed (surname) =

Egyed is a surname. Notable people with the surname include:

- Krisztina Egyed (born 1976), Hungarian speed skater
- Zsolt Egyed (1974–2025), Hungarian electronic technician and politician
