= Eleonóra Zichy =

Hungarian noblewoman

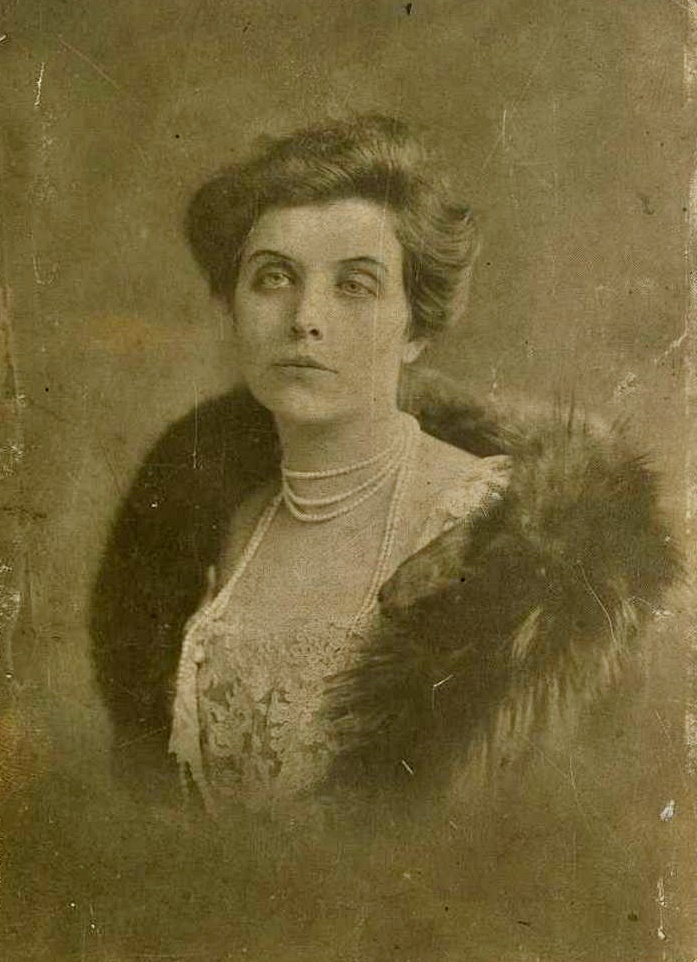
- In 1890
- Born: 28 March 1867; Budapest, Austrian Empire
- Died: 31 October 1945 (aged 78); Budapest, Hungary
- Spouse(s): Tivadar Andrássy (1885–1905); Gyula Andrássy Jr. (1909–1929)
- Children: 4 (including Katinka and Klára)

Countess Eleonóra Zichy de Zich et Vásonkeő (28 March 1867 – 31 October 1945) was a Hungarian noblewoman and a landowner.

== Early life and ancestry ==
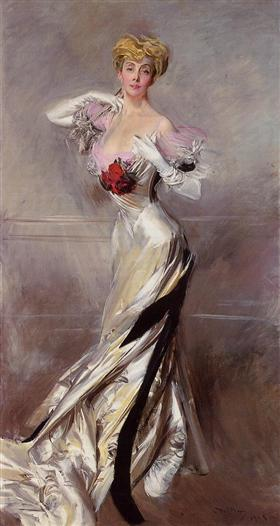
Portrait of Eleonóra Zichy (1905), by Giovanni Boldini

She was born in Budapest, into an old House of Zichy, as the second daughter ofCount Rezső Zichy de Zich et Vásonkeö (1833–1893) and his wife, Countess Jacqueline Péchy Péchy de Péch-Ujfalu (1846–1915). Her maternal grandfather was Count Emanuel Manó Péchy de Péch-Ujfalu (1817–1889), Governor of Transylvania.

== First marriage and issue ==
She married Tivadar Andrássy, son of Gyula Andrássy on 24 June 1885; they had four children:

- Ilona (1886–1967); wife of Count József Cziráky de Czirák et Dénesfalva; emigrated to Canada in 1961
- Borbála (1890–1968), wife of Markgraf György Pallavicini
- Katinka (1892–1985), Red Countess, wife of Count Mihály Károlyi
- Klára (1898–1941), Communist partisan

== Second marriage ==
In 1909, four years after her husband's death, Eleonóra Zichy married to her former brother-in-law, Count Gyula Andrássy the Younger, brother of Tivadar.
