= Manó Andrássy =

Hungarian painter, caricaturist, collector, traveler, and politician

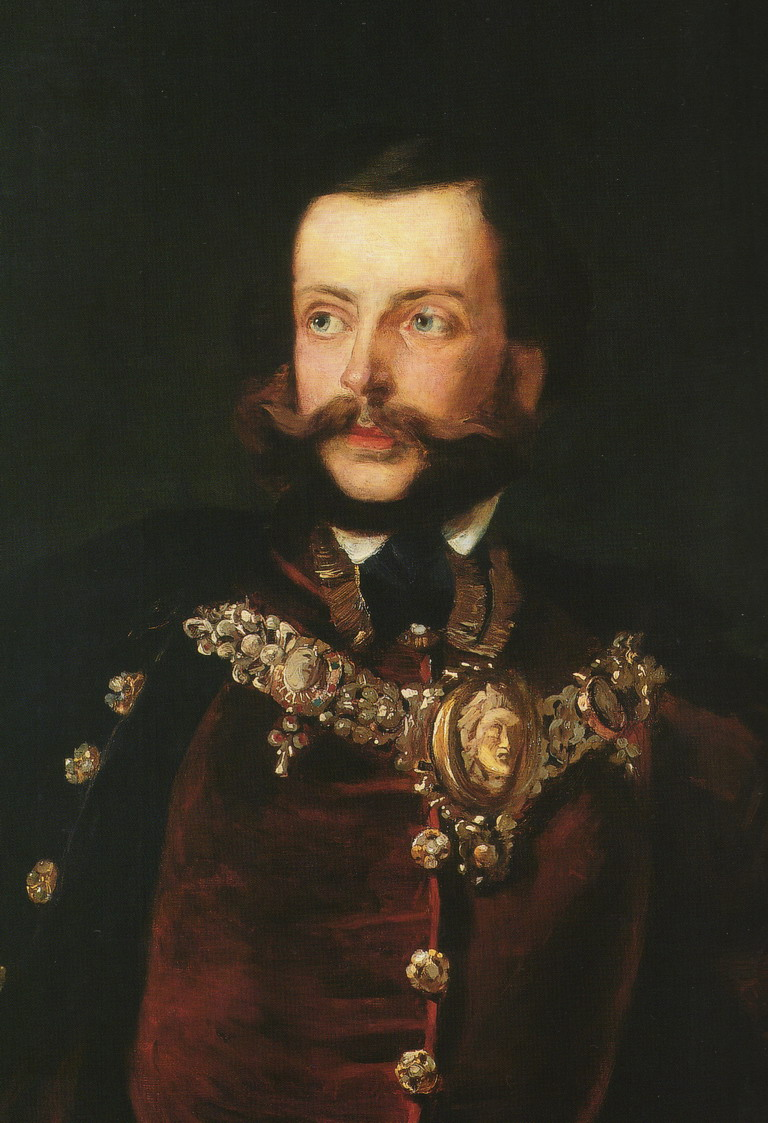
- Self-portrait
- Born: 3 March 1821; Kassa, Kingdom of Hungary
- Died: 23 April 1891 (aged 70); Gorizia, Austria-Hungary
- Occupations: painter, politician
- Spouse: Gabriella Pálffy
- Children: 7
- Parent(s): Károly Andrássy; Etelka Szapáry

Count Manó Andrássy de Csíkszentkirály et Krasznahorka (3 March 1821 – 23 April 1891) was a Hungarian painter, caricaturist, collector, traveler, and politician. He was a member of the Hungarian Academy of Sciences. He served as a representative in the Diet of Hungary from 1881 to 1891.

He participated in the Hungarian Revolution of 1848. After the defeat he lived in emigration, at that time he traveled Asia (mainly China and India). After his return, he acquired great merit for the regulation of the Tisza river. He became Count (comes) of Gömör és Kis-Hont and Zemplén Counties.

== Family ==
His parents were Count Károly Andrássy, a politician and Countess Etelka Szapáry. His younger brother was Gyula Andrássy Sr., Prime Minister of Hungary and Minister of Foreign Affairs of Austria-Hungary. Manó married Countess Gabriella Pálffy de Erdőd (1833–1914).

== Works ==
- Az Utazás Kelet Indiákon: Ceylon, Java, Khina, Bengal (1853)
- Hazai vadászatok és sport (editor, 1857)
