= Katinka Barysch =

German economist and financial commentator

Katinka Barysch is a German economist and financial commentator.

== Early life ==
She gained a BA in Political Science, Economics and Law from LMU Munich. She attended the London School of Economics (LSE), where she gained an MSc in International Political Economy.

== Career ==
=== The Economist ===
From 1997 to 2001 she worked at the Economist Intelligence Unit, becoming Editor.

=== Centre for European Reform ===
She worked at the Centre for European Reform (CER) from 2001, as Chief Economist then becoming deputy director.

She has been part of the Young Global Leaders. She has worked with the Official Monetary and Financial Institutions Forum (OMFIF). She has been twice nominated for prizes from the Society of Business Economists.

== Publications ==
- New Designs for Europe, 2002, CER, ISBN 1901229351

== See also ==
- Category:Germany and the European Union
