= Katinka Andrássy =

Hungarian noblewoman (1892-1985)

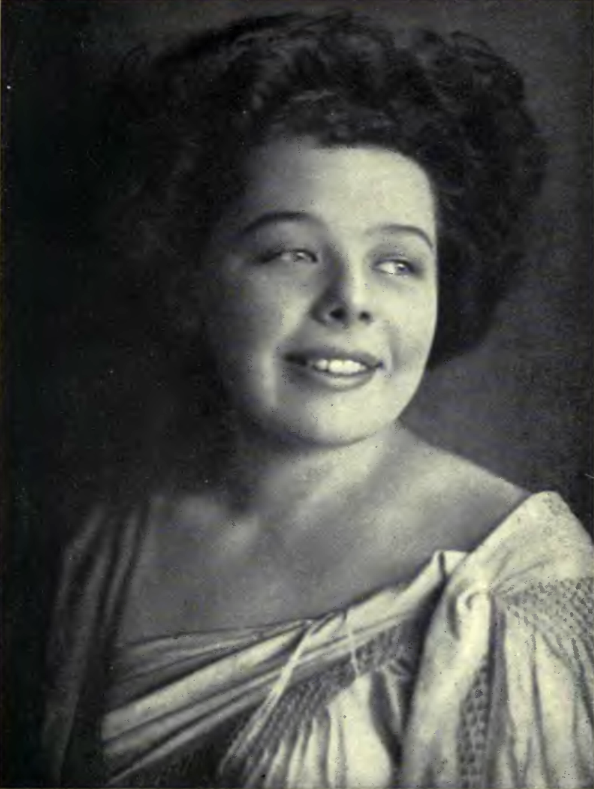
- Born: Katalin Andrássy de Csíkszentkirály és Krasznahorkai; 21 September 1892; Tiszadob, Austria-Hungary
- Died: 12 June 1985 (aged 92); Antibes, France
- Spouse: Mihály Károlyi (m. 1914; died 1955)
- Children: 3
- Parents: Tivadar Andrássy (father); Eleonóra Zichy (mother)
- Relatives: Gyula Andrássy (paternal grandfather); Katinka Kendeffy (paternal grandmother); Klára Andrássy (sister)

Countess Katalin Károlyi (née Countess Katalin Andrássy de Csíkszentkirály és Krasznahorkai; 21 September 1892 – 12 June 1985) was a Hungarian noblewoman and the wife of Count Mihály Károlyi, who served as Prime Minister then President of the First Hungarian Republic after the First World War.

She and her husband lived abroad from 1919 to 1955 when Mihály Károlyi died. She then lived abroad independently till her own death in 1985. She was called by political opponents as the Red Countess after her husband.

== Family ==
Her father was Count Tivadar Andrássy, a politician and painter, eldest son of Prime Minister of Hungary Gyula Andrássy. She was named after her grandmother, Countess Katinka Kendeffy. She had three sisters: Ilona, Borbála and Klára (or Kája).

She married Count Mihály Károlyi (1875–1955) on 7 November 1914 in Budapest. According to Hungarian tradition, she wore the name of her husband. They had three children: Éva, Ádám and Judit.

== Films ==
- The Red Countess, a 1985 Hungarian drama film directed by András Kovács.
