= Katinka Kendeffy =

Hungarian noblewoman (1830–1896)

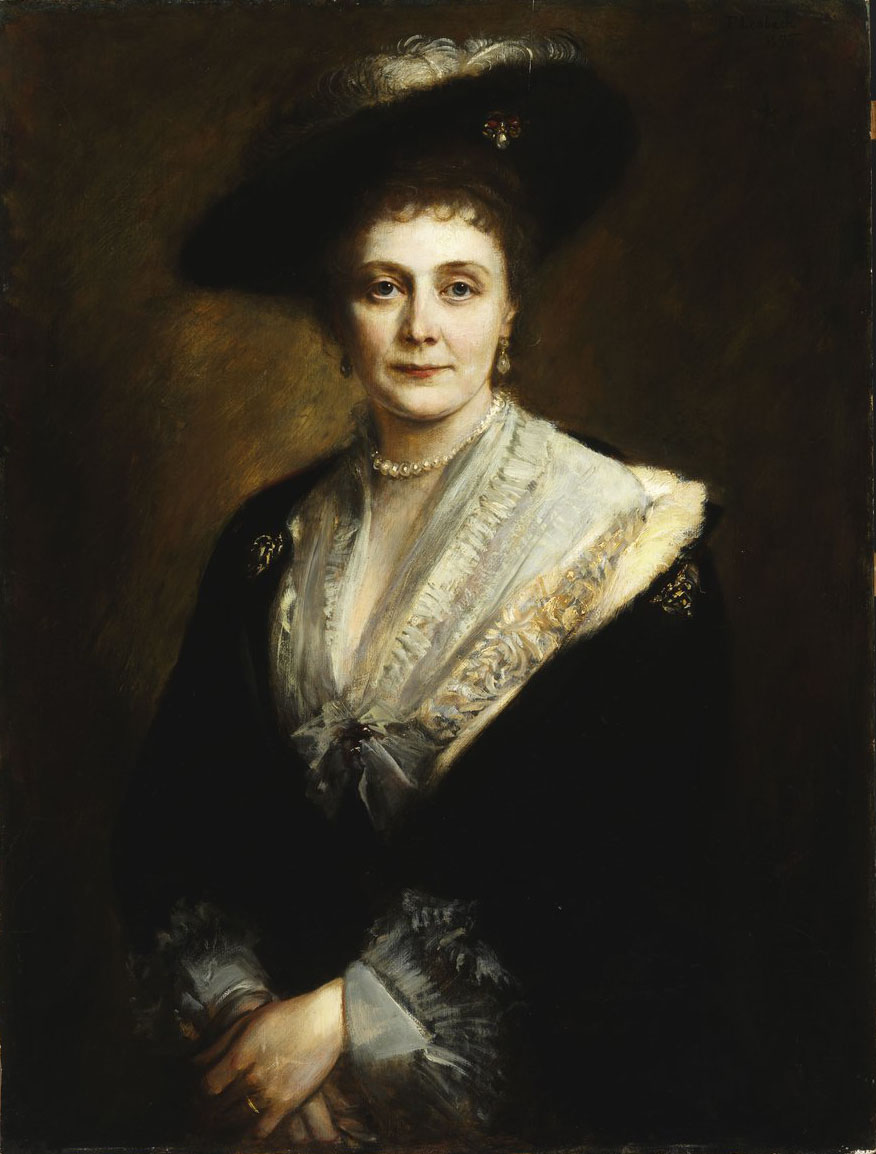
- Katinka Kendeffy in 1875, by Franz von Lenbach
- Born: Katalin Kendeffy de Malomvíz; 1830; Kolozsvár, Kingdom of Hungary, Austrian Empire, (now Cluj-Napoca, Romania)
- Died: 16 May 1896 (aged 65–66); Budapest, Austria-Hungary
- Spouse: Gyula Andrássy
- Children: Tivadar; Ilona; Manó; Gyula

Countess Katinka Kendeffy de Malomvíz Andrássy (1830 – 16 May 1896) was a Hungarian noblewoman and the wife of Count Gyula Andrássy, who served as Prime Minister of Hungary (1867–1871) and Minister of Foreign Affairs of Austria-Hungary (1871–1879).

== Early life ==
Kendeffy was born in Kolozsvár, Kingdom of Hungary, Austrian Empire (now Cluj-Napoca, Romania) to Count Ádám Kendeffy de Malomvíz (1795–1834), a liberal politician, and his wife, Countess Borbála "Bora" Bethlen de Bethlen (1800–1880).

== Biography ==
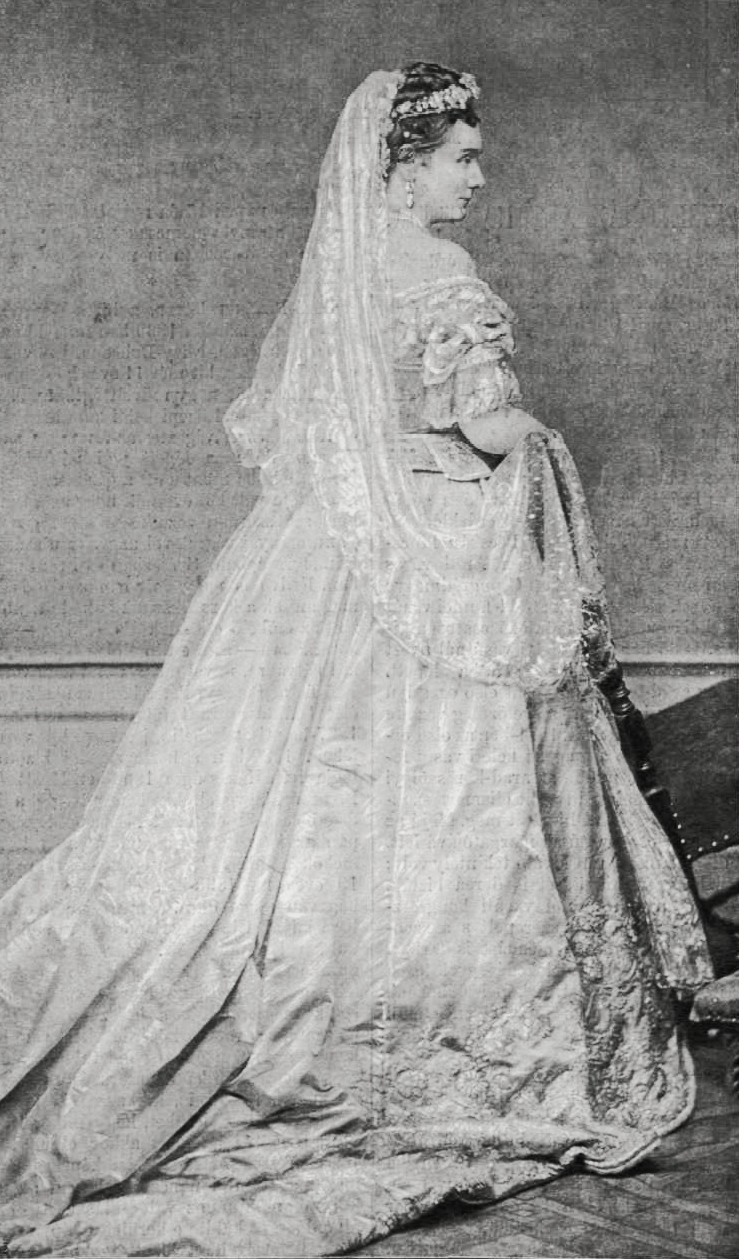
Countess Katinka Kendeffy Andrássy (1830–1896) in 1867, on the occasion of the coronation of Franz Joseph I

After the coronation of King Franz Joseph I, she became Hungarian marshalless and an intimate friend of Empress Elisabeth of Austria (Sissi). She died in 1896, six years after her husband.

== Personal life ==
She married Count Gyula Andrássy de Csíkszentkirály et Krasznahorka in Paris, on 9 July 1856, when Andrássy lived in emigration after defeat of the Hungarian Revolution of 1848. They had four children:

- Tivadar (1857–1905): politician, first husband of Countess Eleonóra Zichy de Zich et Vásonkeő (1867–1945)
- Ilona (1858–1952): wife of Count Lajos Batthyány de Németújvár (1860–1951) who served as Governor of Fiume
- Manó (?)
- Gyula (1860–1929): politician, second husband of Countess Eleonóra Zichy de Zich et Vásonkeő (1867–1945).
