= Gyula Andrássy the Younger =

Hungarian politician (1860–1929)

Gyula Andrássy, Jr.
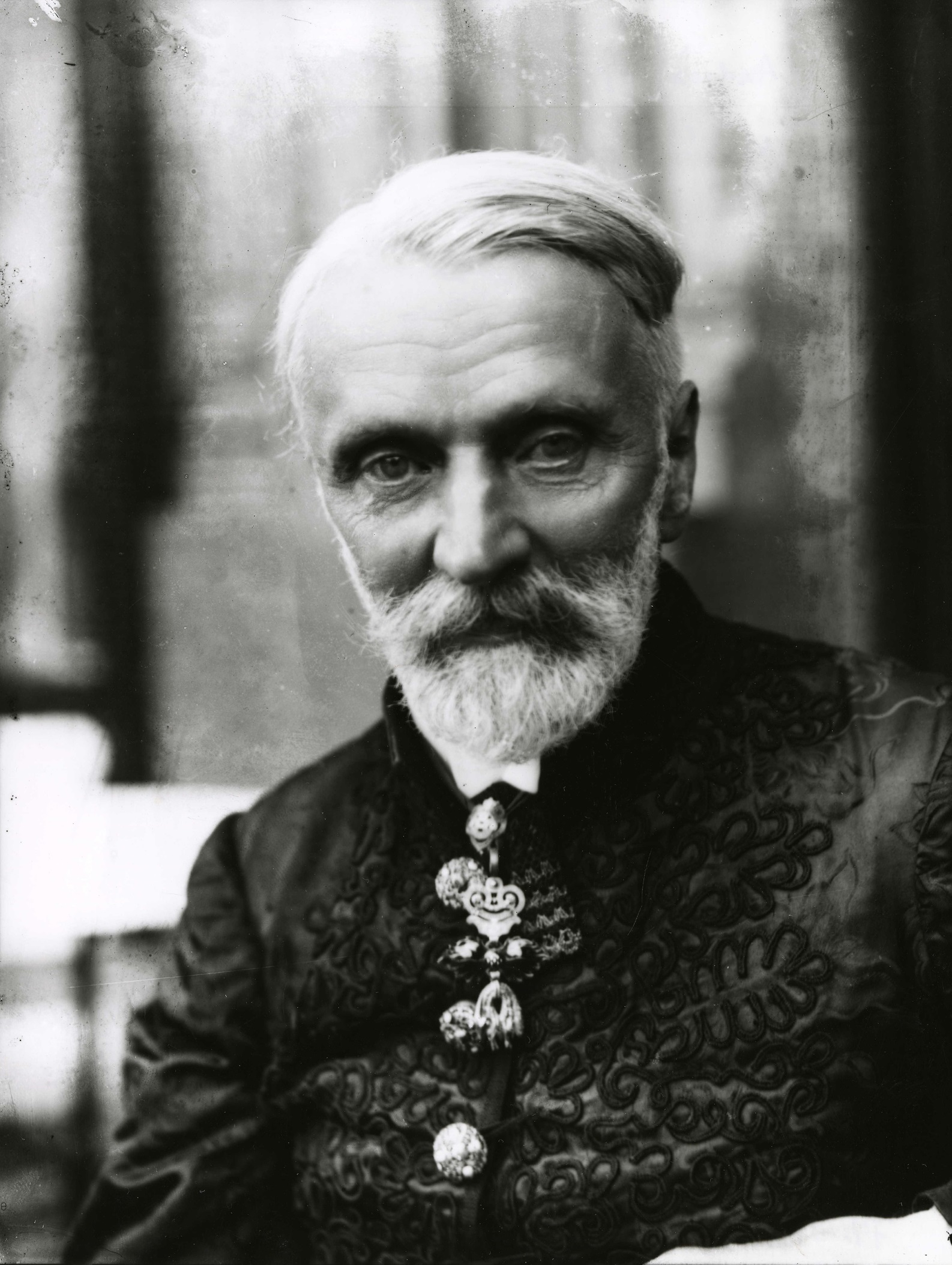

Foreign Minister of Austria-Hungary
- In office 24 October 1918 – 2 November 1918
- Monarch: Charles I
- Preceded by: Stephan Burián von Rajecz
- Succeeded by: Ludwig von Flotow (liquidating)

Minister of the Interior of Hungary
- In office 8 April 1906 – 17 January 1910
- Prime Minister: Sándor Wekerle
- Preceded by: József Kristóffy
- Succeeded by: Károly Khuen-Héderváry

Minister of Foreign Affairs of Hungary
- In office 10 June 1894 – 15 January 1895
- Prime Minister: Sándor Wekerle
- Preceded by: Lajos Tisza
- Succeeded by: Géza Fejérváry

Personal details
- Born: 30 June 1860 Tőketerebes, Kingdom of Hungary, Austrian Empire
- Died: 11 June 1929 (aged 68) Budapest, Kingdom of Hungary
- Party: Liberal Party, Constitution Party, KNEP, Christian National Party
- Spouse: Eleonóra Zichy
- Parent(s): Gyula Andrássy; Katinka Kendeffy
- Profession: Politician

Count Gyula Andrássy de Csíkszentkirály et Krasznahorka the Younger (Hungarian: Ifj. Andrássy Gyula; 30 June 1860 – 11 June 1929) was a Hungarian politician.

== Biography ==
The second son of Count Gyula Andrássy and Countess Katinka Kendeffy, the younger Andrássy became under-secretary in the Sándor Wekerle ministry in 1892; in 1893, he became Minister of Education, and, in June 1894, he was appointed minister in attendance on the king, retiring in 1895 with Wekerle. In 1898, with his elder brother, he left the Liberal Party but returned to it after the fall of the Bánffy ministry. In 1905, he was one of the leaders of the Coalition which brought about the fall of the Liberal Tisza ministry. In 1906 he became Minister of the Interior in the compromise Wekerle cabinet and held that office until the fall of the ministry in 1909.

In 1912, he represented Austria-Hungary in the diplomatic endeavor to prevent the outbreak of the Balkan War. In 1915, he urged peacemaking and an extension of the franchise in Hungary. As Foreign Minister of Austria-Hungary, in 1918, he declared the alliance with Germany dissolved and tried to conclude a separate peace. He retired from office in the same year was returned in 1920 to the National Assembly as non-partisan delegate. He subsequently became leader of the Christian National Party. He is the author of Ungarns Ausgleich mit Österreich vom Jahre 1867 (Ger. ed., Leipzig, 1897) and a work in Hungarian on the origins of the Hungarian state and constitution (Budapest, 1901). That book was translated into English and published as The Development of Hungarian Constitutional Liberty (London, 1908) His later works include Wer hat den Krieg verbrochen? Interessensolidarität des Deutschtums and Ungartums (translated by Ernest J. Euphrat and published in 1915 as "Whose Sin is the World-War?") and Diplomatie und Weltkrieg. He also wrote Bismarck, Andrássy and their successors (1927)

Political offices
Preceded by Lajos Tisza	Minister besides the King; 1894–1895	Succeeded by Géza Fejérváry
Preceded by József Kristóffy	Minister of the Interior; 1906–1910	Succeeded by Károly Khuen-Héderváry
Preceded by István Burián	Joint Foreign Minister of Austria-Hungary; 1918	Succeeded by post abolished
Party political offices
Preceded by New party	Chairman of the Constitution Party; 1905–1906	Succeeded by Kálmán Széll
