= Gyula Andrássy =

Hungarian statesman (1823–1890)

Count Gyula Andrássy de Csíkszentkirály et Krasznahorka
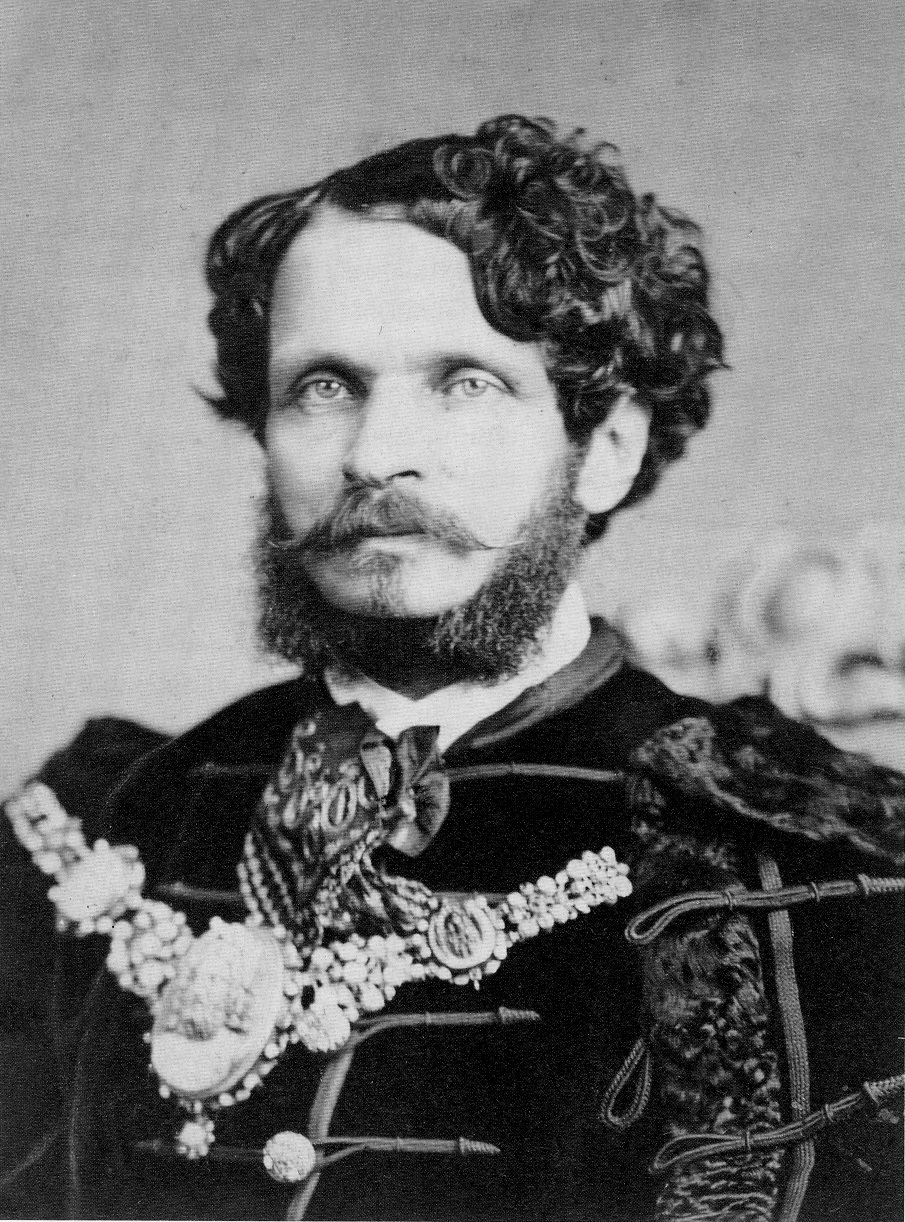

Prime Minister of the Kingdom of Hungary
- In office 17 February 1867 – 14 November 1871
- Monarch: Franz Joseph I
- Preceded by: Bertalan Szemere
- Succeeded by: Menyhért Lónyay

Foreign Minister of Austria-Hungary
- In office 14 November 1871 – 8 October 1879
- Preceded by: Count Friedrich Ferdinand Beust
- Succeeded by: Baron Heinrich Karl von Haymerle

Member of the House of Representatives
- In office 17 April 1861 – 22 April 1869
- Constituency: Sátoraljaújhely

Personal details
- Born: 3 March 1823 Oláhpatak, Kingdom of Hungary, Austrian Empire (today Vlachovo, Slovakia)
- Died: 18 February 1890 (aged 66) Volosca, Austria-Hungary (today Volosko, Croatia)
- Party: Deák Party
- Spouse: Katinka Kendeffy
- Children: Tivadar; Ilona; Manó; Gyula
- Parent(s): Károly Andrássy; Etelka Szapáry
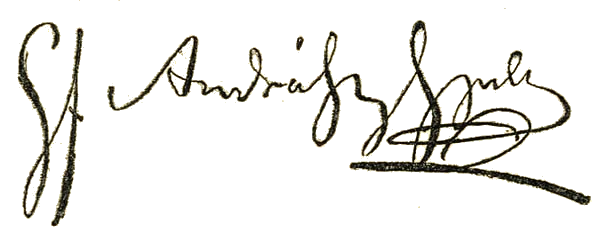
- Signature

Count Gyula Andrássy de Csíkszentkirály et Krasznahorka (Hungarian: [ˈɒndraːʃi ˈɟulɒ], 8 March 1823 – 18 February 1890) was a Hungarian statesman, who served as Prime Minister of Hungary (1867–1871) and subsequently as Foreign Minister of Austria-Hungary (1871–1879). Andrássy was a conservative; his foreign policies looked to expanding the Empire into Southeast Europe, preferably with British and German support, and without alienating Turkey. He saw Russia as the main adversary, because of its own expansionist policies toward Slavic and Orthodox areas. He distrusted Slavic nationalist movements as a threat to his multi-ethnic empire.

== Biography ==
The son of Count Károly Andrássy and Etelka Szapáry, he was born in Oláhpatak (present-day Vlachovo, Rožňava District, Slovakia), Kingdom of Hungary, Austrian Empire. His date and place of birth, however, are somewhat disputed. According to the registry of Košice, Andrássy was baptised in the city, then known as Kassa on 3 March 1823. The son of a liberal father who belonged to the political opposition, at a time when opposing the government was very dangerous, Andrássy at a very early age threw himself into the political struggles of the day, adopting at the outset the patriotic side.

=== Career ===
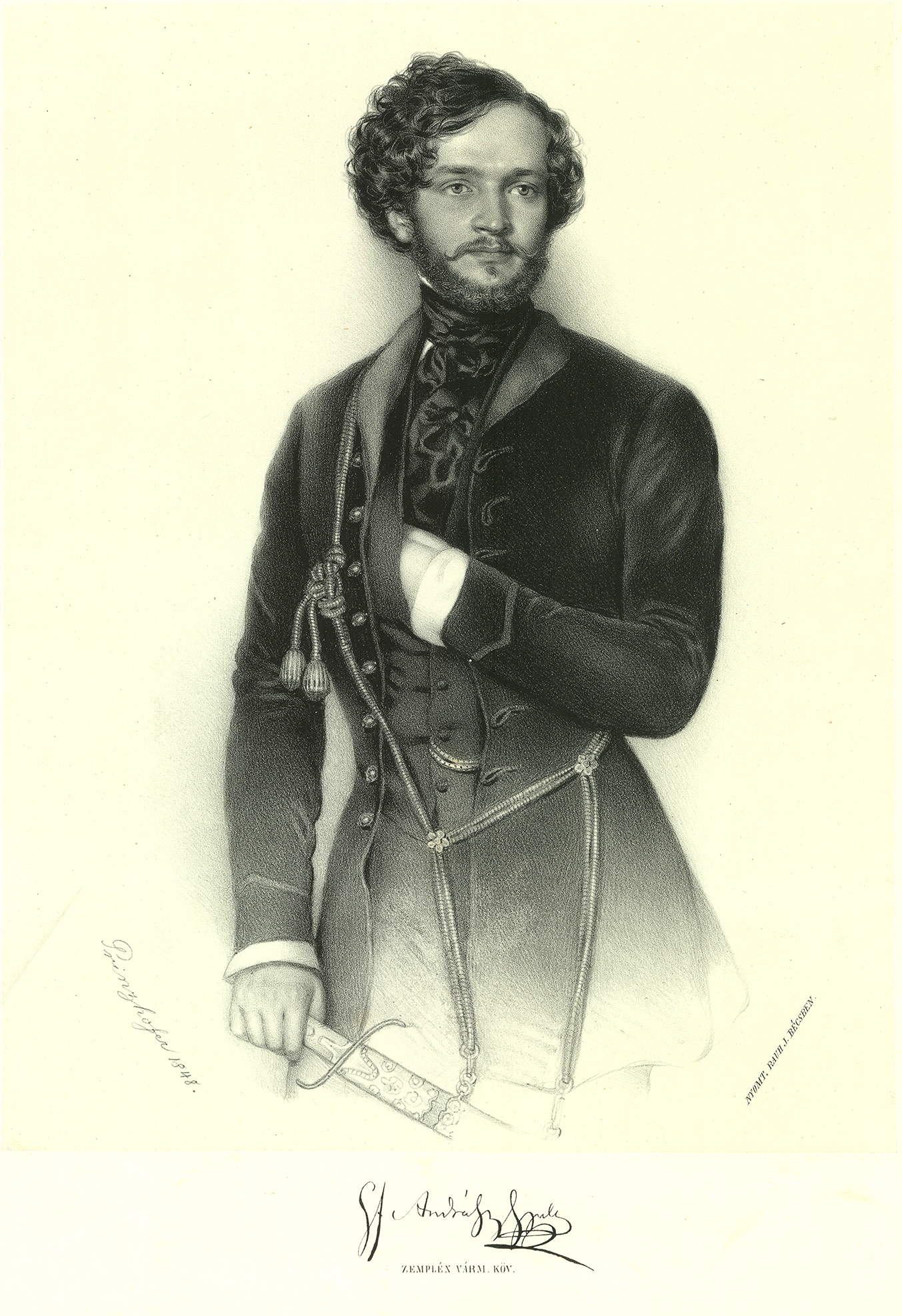
Gyula Andrássy in 1848

Count István Széchenyi was the first adequately to appreciate his capacity. In 1845 Andrássy was appointed as president of the society for the regulation of the waters of the Upper Tisza River. In 1846, he attracted attention by publishing highly critical articles of the government in Lajos Kossuth's paper, the Pesti Hírlap. He was elected as one of the Radical candidates to the Diet of 1848.

When the Croats under Josip Jelačić attempted to have Međimurje, which was then part of Hungary, returned to Croatia, Andrássy entered military service. He was commander of the gentry of his county, and served with distinction at the battles of Pákozd and Schwechat, as Artúr Görgei's adjutant (1848). Toward the end of the war, Andrássy was sent to Constantinople by the revolutionary government. He was seeking to obtain the neutrality of the Ottoman Empire, if not their support, during the struggle with Croatia.

After the catastrophe of Világos, where the Hungarians were defeated, Andrássy emigrated to London and then to Paris. On 21 September 1851, he was condemned in absentia to death and was hanged in effigy by the Austrian government for his share in the Hungarian revolt. In exile for ten years, he studied politics in what was then the centre of European diplomacy. He discerned the weakness of the second French empire beneath its imposing exterior.

Andrássy returned to Hungary in 1858, but his position was still difficult. He had never petitioned for an amnesty, and had steadily rejected all the overtures both of the Austrian government and of the Magyar Conservatives (who would have accepted something short of full autonomy for the kingdom). He enthusiastically supported Ferenc Deák's party.

On 21 December 1865, he was chosen vice-president of the Diet. In March 1866, he was elected as president of the sub-committee appointed by the parliamentary commission to draw up the Austro-Hungarian Compromise of 1867 between Austria and Hungary. He originated the idea of the "Delegations" of powers. It was said at that time that he was the only member of the commission who could persuade the court of the justice of the national claims.

In the 1866 Battle of Königgrätz (also called the Battle of Sadowa), Prussia decisively defeated Austria in the short Austro-Prussian War. It ended Austria's hopes for a role in uniting Germany. Bismarck wanted to restore good relations after the war. Emperor Franz Joseph I for the first time consulted Andrássy, who recommended the re-establishment of the constitution and the appointment of a responsible foreign and defence ministry. On 17 February 1867 the king/emperor appointed him as the first prime minister of the Hungarian half of the newly formed Dual Monarchy of Austria-Hungary. The obvious first choice had been Ferenc Deák, one of the architects of the Compromise, but he declined in favour of Andrássy. Deák described him as "the providential statesman given to Hungary by the grace of God."

As premier, Andrássy by his firmness, amiability and dexterity as a debater, soon won for himself a commanding position. Yet his position continued to be difficult, inasmuch as the authority of Deák dwarfed that of all the party leaders, however eminent. Andrássy chose for himself the departments of war and foreign affairs. It was he who reorganized the Honvéd system (state army), and he used often to say that the regulation of the military border districts was the most difficult labour of his life.

On the outbreak of the Franco-Prussian War of 1870, Andrássy resolutely defended the neutrality of the Austrian monarchy, and in his speech on 28 July 1870 warmly protested against the assumption that it was in the interests of Austria to seek to recover the position it had held in Germany before 1863. On the fall of Beust (6 November 1871), Andrássy stepped into his place. His tenure of the chancellorship was epoch-making. Where Beust had been hostile to Germany and friendly toward Russia, Andrássy took the opposite approach. One problem was that Germany was close to Italy, but Italy and Austria were at odds about who would control border areas.

Hitherto the empire of the Habsburgs had never been able to dissociate itself from its historic Holy Roman traditions. But its loss of influence in Italy and Germany, and the consequent formation of the Dual State, had at length indicated the proper, and, indeed, the only field for its diplomacy in the future – the Near East, where the process of the crystallization of the Balkan peoples into nationalities was still incomplete. The question was whether these nationalities were to be allowed to become independent or were only to exchange the tyranny of the sultan for the tyranny of the tsar or the Habsburg emperor.

To this point Austria had been content either to keep out the Russians or share the booty with them. She was now, moreover, in consequence of her misfortunes deprived of most of her influence in the councils of Europe.

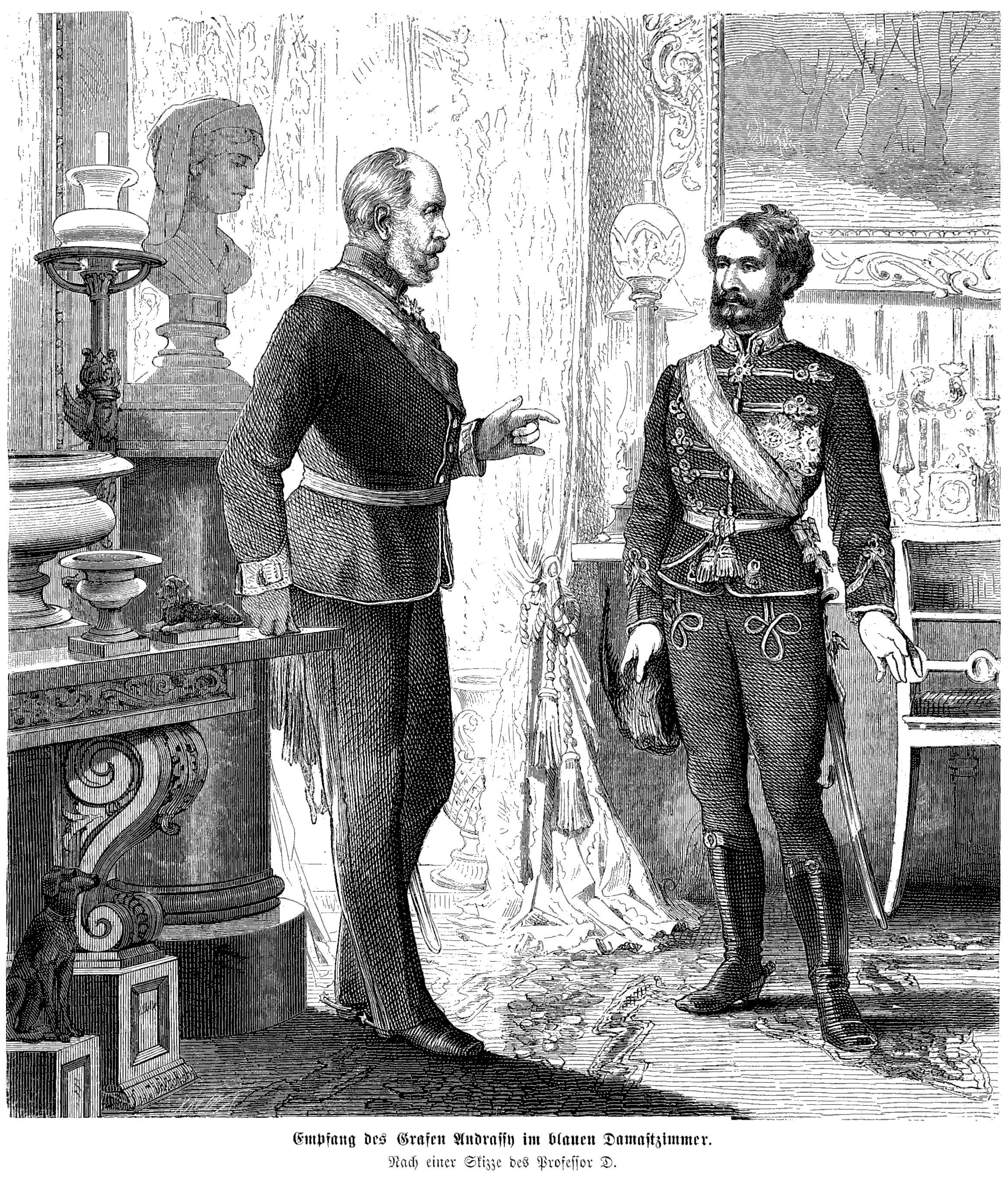
Andrássy in conversation with German Emperor Wilhelm I, 1872

It was Andrassy who recovered for Austria her proper place in the European concert. First he approached the German emperor; then more satisfactory relations were established with the courts of Italy and Russia by means of conferences at Berlin, Vienna, St Petersburg and Venice.

=== The "Andrássy Note" ===
The recovered influence of Austria was evident in the negotiations which followed the outbreak of an uprising in Bosnia and Herzegovina in 1875. The three courts of Vienna, Berlin and St Petersburg reached an understanding as to their attitude in the Eastern question, and their views were embodied in the dispatch, known as the "Andrássy Note", sent on 30 December 1875 by Andrássy to Count Beust, the Austrian ambassador to the Court of St James's.

In it he pointed out that the efforts of the powers to localize the revolt seemed in danger of failure, that the rebels were still holding their own, and that the Ottoman promises of reform, embodied in various firmans, were no more than vague statements of principle which had never had, and were probably not intended to have, any local application. In order to avert the risk of a general conflagration, therefore, he urged that the time had come for concerted action of the powers for the purpose of pressing the Porte to fulfil its promises. A sketch of the more essential reforms followed: the recognition rather than the toleration of the Christian religion; the abolition of the system of farming the taxes; and, in Bosnia and Herzegovina, where the religious was complicated by an agrarian question, the conversion of the Christian peasants into free proprietors, to rescue them from their double subjection to the Muslim Ottoman landowners. In Bosnia and Herzegovina elected provincial councils were to be established, life-term judges appointed and individual liberties guaranteed. Finally, a mixed commission of Muslims and Christians was to be empowered to watch over the carrying out of these reforms.

The fact that the sultan would be responsible to Europe for the realization of his promises would serve to allay the natural suspicions of the insurgents. To this plan both Britain and France gave a general assent, and the Andrássy Note was adopted as the basis of negotiations.

When unrest in the Balkans escalated into the Great Eastern Crisis and war became inevitable between Russia and the Porte, Andrássy arranged with the Russian court that, in case Russia prevailed, the status quo should not be changed to the detriment of the Austrian monarchy. When, however, the Treaty of San Stefano threatened a Russian hegemony in the Near East, Andrássy concurred with the German and British courts that the final adjustment of matters must be submitted to a European congress.

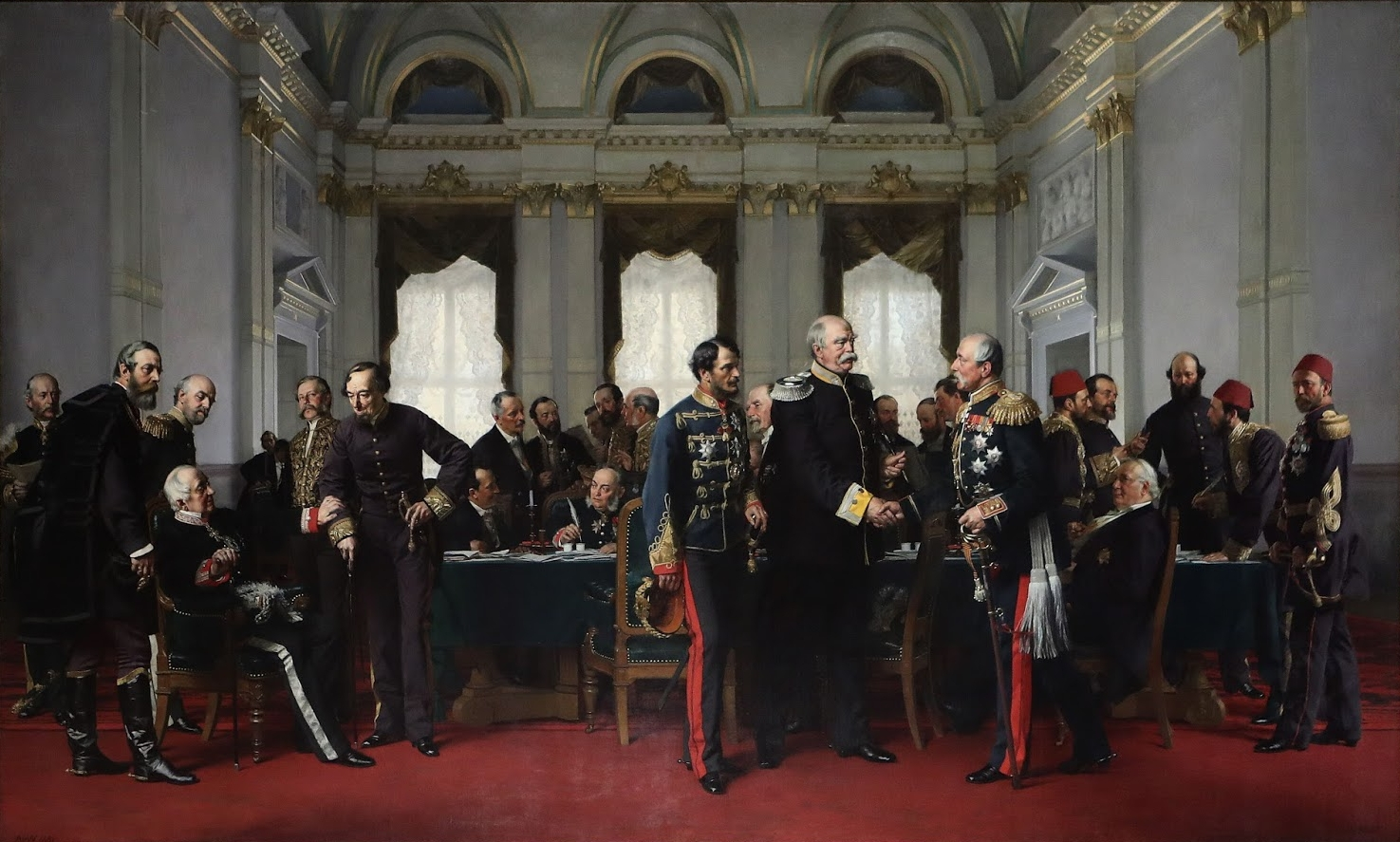
Andrássy (in blue uniform centre) at the Congress of Berlin, 1878

At the Congress of Berlin in 1878 he was the principal Austrian plenipotentiary, and directed his efforts to diminish the gains of Russia and aggrandize the Dual Monarchy. Before the Congress opened on 13 June, negotiations between Andrássy and the British Foreign Secretary Marquess of Salisbury had already "ended on 6 June by Britain agreeing to all the Austrian proposals relative to Bosnia-Herzegovina about to come before the congress while Austria would support British demands".

In addition to the occupation and administration of Bosnia-Herzegovina, Andrássy also obtained the right to station garrisons in the Sanjak of Novi Pazar, which remained under Ottoman administration. The Sanjak preserved the separation of Serbia and Montenegro, and the Austro-Hungarian garrisons there would open the way for a dash to Salonika that "would bring the western half of the Balkans under permanent Austrian influence". "High [Austro-Hungarian] military authorities desired [an ...] immediate major expedition with Salonika as its objective".

This occupation was most unpopular in Hungary, both for financial reasons and because of the strong pro-Turk sentiments of the Magyars.

On 28 September 1878 the Finance Minister, Koloman von Zell, threatened to resign if the army, behind which stood the Archduke Albert, were allowed to advance to Salonika. In the session of the Hungarian Parliament of 5 November 1878 the Opposition proposed that the Foreign Minister should be impeached for violating the constitution by his policy during the Near East Crisis and by the occupation of Bosnia-Herzegovina. The motion was lost by 179 to 95. By the Opposition rank and file the gravest accusations were raised against Andrassy.

On 10 October 1878 the French diplomat Melchior de Vogüé described the situation as follows:

Particularly in Hungary the dissatisfaction caused by this "adventure" has reached the gravest proportions, prompted by that strong conservative instinct which animates the Magyar race and is the secret of its destinies. This vigorous and exclusive instinct explains the historical phenomenon of an isolated group, small in numbers yet dominating a country inhabited by a majority of peoples of different races and conflicting aspirations, and playing a role in European affairs out of all proportions to its numerical importance or intellectual culture. This instinct is to-day awakened and gives warning that it feels the occupation of Bosnia-Herzegovina to be a menace which, by introducing fresh Slav elements into the Hungarian political organism and providing a wider field and further recruitment of the Croat opposition, would upset the unstable equilibrium in which the Magyar domination is poised.

Andrássy felt constrained to bow before the storm, and he placed his resignation in the emperor's hands (8 October 1879). The day before his retirement he signed the offensive-defensive alliance with Germany, which placed the foreign relations of Austria-Hungary once more on a stable footing.

== Later life ==
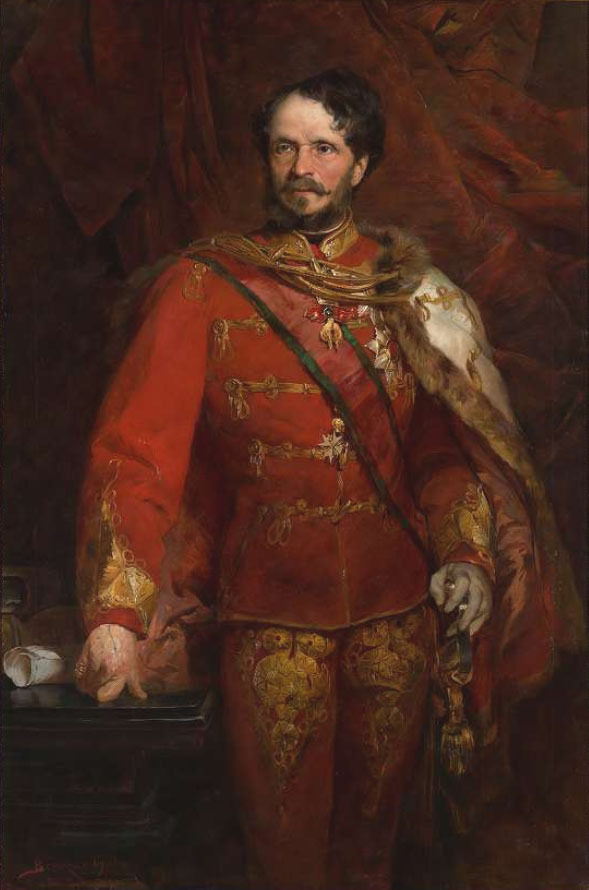
Gyula Andrássy (painting by Gyula Benczúr in 1884)

After his retirement, Andrássy continued to take an active part in public affairs both in the Delegations and in the Upper House. In 1885 he warmly supported the project for the reform of the House of Magnates, but on the other hand he jealously defended the inviolability of the Composition of 1867, and on 5 March 1889 in his place in the Upper House spoke against any particularist tampering with the common army. In the last years of his life he regained his popularity, and his death on 18 February 1890, aged 66, was mourned as a national calamity. There is a plaque dedicated to him in the town of Volosko where he died (between Rijeka and Opatija in present-day Croatia). It is located just above the restaurant Amfora.

He was the first Magyar statesman who, for centuries, had occupied a European position. It has been said that he united in himself the Magyar magnate with the modern gentleman. His motto was: "It is hard to promise, but it is easy to perform."

== Family ==
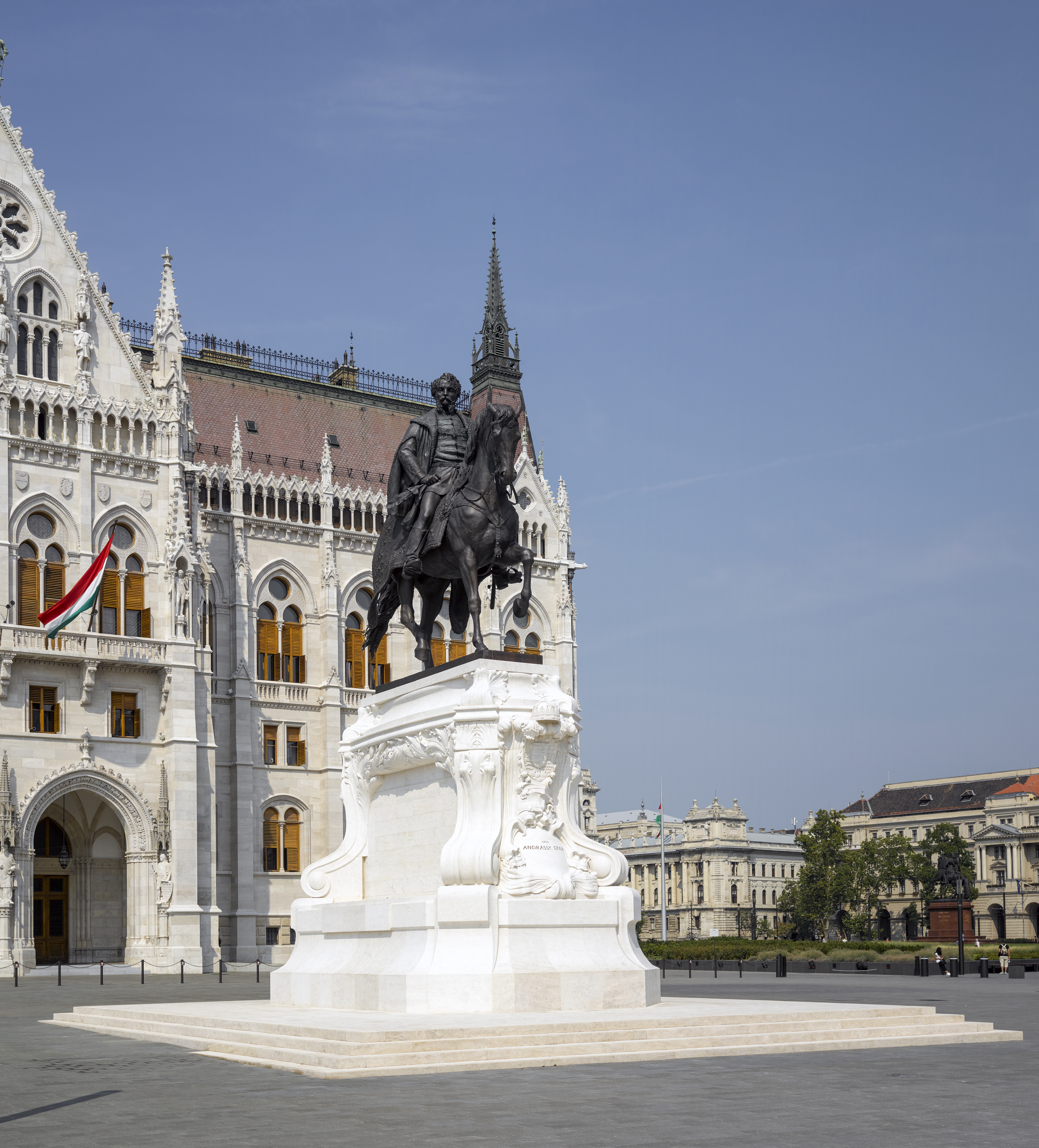
Statue of Gyula Andrássy, next to the Hungarian Parliament Building.

Andrássy married countess Katinka Kendeffy in Paris in 1856. They had two sons, Tivadar (born 10 July 1857) and Gyula (born 30 June 1860), and one daughter, Ilona (b. 1858). Both sons gained distinction in Hungarian politics. Tivadar was elected vice-president of the Lower House of the Hungarian parliament in 1890. Gyula also had a successful political career.

Count Gyula Andrássy's granddaughter, Klára, married the Hungarian nobleman and industrialist Prince Károly Odescalchi.

Many rumors suggest that Count Andrássy had a long lasting romance with Elisabeth, Empress of Austria and Queen of Hungary, also known as Sisi, the wife of Emperor Franz Josef I of Austria-Hungary. Some rumored that Sisi's fourth child, Archduchess Marie Valerie of Austria, had been fathered by Andrassy. There is no evidence for this, and these rumors have all been proven to be false. The rumor may have evolved due to the devotion of both Sisi and Count Andrássy towards Hungary, its culture and national customs (she was fluent in Hungarian, and both regarded Hungarian poetry highly), and the amount of time they spent together in mutual pursuit of their dreams for Hungary. Additionally, as Marie Valerie grew up, her physical resemblance to her father Franz Josef became very marked.

Count Andrássy had four granddaughters, Klára above, Borbála, married Marquis Pallavicini, Katalin married Count Mihály Károlyi and Ilona war widow of Prince Pál Esterházy, remarried Count József Cziráky.

== Honours ==
He received the following orders and decorations:

- Austria-Hungary:
  - Grand Cross of the Royal Hungarian Order of St. Stephen, 1867
  - Knight of the Golden Fleece, 1877
- Baden: Knight of the House Order of Fidelity, 1873
- Bavaria: Knight of St. Hubert, 1873
- Belgium: Grand Cordon of the Order of Leopold
- France: Grand Cross of the Legion of Honour
- Greece: Grand Cross of the Redeemer
- Italy: Knight of the Annunciation, 28 November 1873
- Sovereign Military Order of Malta: Bailiff Grand Cross of Honour and Devotion
- Netherlands: Grand Cross of the Netherlands Lion
- Ottoman Empire: Order of the Medjidie, 1st Class in Diamonds
- Persia: Order of the August Portrait, in Diamonds
- Portugal: Grand Cross of the Tower and Sword
- Prussia: Knight of the Black Eagle, 10 September 1872
- Russian Empire:
  - Knight of St. Andrew, 1874
  - Knight of St. Alexander Nevsky
  - Knight of the White Eagle
  - Knight of St. Anna, 1st Class
  - Knight of St. Stanislaus, 1st Class
- Saxony: Knight of the Rue Crown, 1872
- Siam: Grand Cross of the Crown of Siam
- Württemberg: Grand Cross of the Württemberg Crown, 1874

== See also ==
- Andrássy Castle

== Notes ==
Political offices
Preceded by Bertalan Szemere	Prime Minister of Hungary; 1867–1871	Succeeded by Menyhért Lónyay
Preceded by Lajos Aulich	Minister of Defence; 1867–1871	Succeeded by Menyhért Lónyay
Preceded by Friedrich Ferdinand von Beust	Joint Foreign Minister of Austria-Hungary; 1871–1879	Succeeded by Heinrich Karl von Haymerle
Preceded by Menyhért Lónyay	Joint Minister of Finance of Austria-Hungary; Acting; 1871–1872	Succeeded by Ludwig von Holzgethan
Preceded by Ludwig von Holzgethan	Joint Minister of Finance of Austria-Hungary; Acting; 1876	Succeeded by Leopold Hofmann
