= Erik Fülöp =

Hungarian lawyer and politician

Member of the National Assembly
- In office 8 May 2018 – 1 May 2022

Mayor of Tiszavasvári
- In office 3 October 2010 – 16 September 2018

Personal details
- Born: 21 July 1982 (age 43) Nyíregyháza, Hungary
- Party: Jobbik (2010–2018); Our Homeland (2018–2021) non-partisan (since 2021)

Erik Sándor Fülöp (born in Nyíregyháza, Hungary on 21 July 1982) is a Hungarian lawyer and politician. He was a member of parliament in National Assembly of Hungary (Országgyűlés). He was elected into office in 2018. Between 2010 and 2018 he served as mayor of Tiszavasvár.

== Early life ==
Fülöp was born on 21 July 1982 in Nyíregyháza. Between 1994 and 2000, he attended the Váci Mihály High School in Tiszavasvár, where he graduated. From 2000 to 2005 he attended University of Miskolc and studied law. He graduated University of Miskolc with a degree in law.

== Career ==
Fülöp joined Jobbik in 2010. Between 2010 and 2018, he was the mayor of Tiszavasvári, and from 2014 he was as representative of the Szabolcs-Szatmár-Bereg County Assembly.

In 2018, he gained a parliamentary seat on Jobbik's national list and resigned as Mayor of Tiszavasvári. On 8 October 2018 he left Jobbik and became a member of the Our Homeland Movement. On 25 January 2021 Erik Fülöp announced his resignation from the Our Homeland Movement on his Facebook page. He continued to work as an independent, focusing on his own field of expertise, animal welfare, rather than party politics. He was a member of the committee on Legislation and committee on Justice in the National Assembly of Hungary.

In September 2021, he announced that he would not run in the 2022 parliamentary election.
