= István Andrássy =

István Andrássy may refer to:

- István Andrássy (author), Hungarian author and nobleman
- István Andrássy (general) (1650–1720), Hungarian Kuruc general and nobleman
- István Andrássy (scientist) (1927–2012), Hungarian nematologist
