= Betliar Mansion =

Historic site in Slovakia

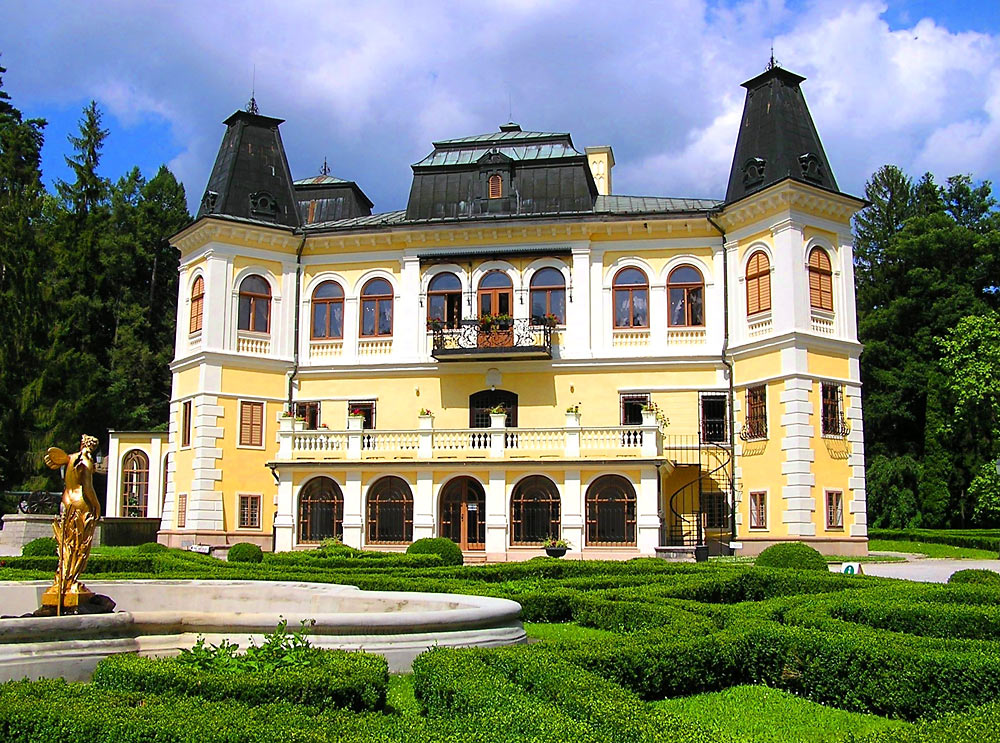
- The mansion in 2016

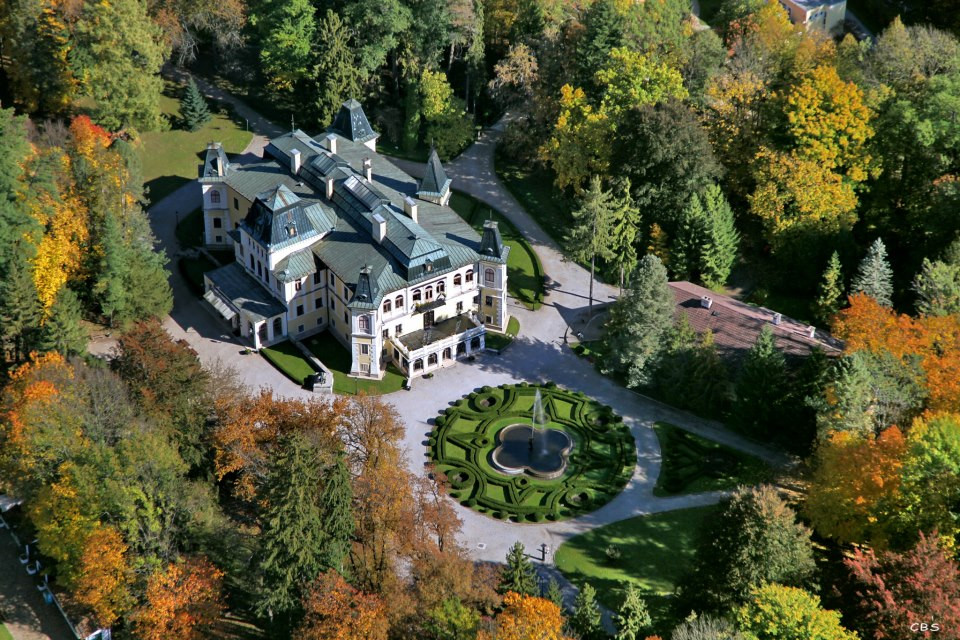
- Aerial view

Site information
- Type: Castle

Location
- Coordinates: 48.706111°N 20.510278°E

Betliar Mansion (Slovak: Kaštieľ v Betliari), also referred to as a manor house, is a historic site located in the village of Betliar, 7 km north of the district town of Rožňava in the Košice Region of Slovakia. It is the most visited manor house in southeastern Slovakia.

Originally constructed as a small fortress, it was subsequently expanded and renovated by the noble Andrássy family. In the late 19th century, the estate was transformed into a grand hunting lodge, featuring a two-storey structure with four corner towers. The southern facade includes a flat bay, and all facades are characterized by semicircular windows, with some set in small balconies with latticework. The building retains a Renaissance portal at the entrance, and the ground floor perimeter walls were historically equipped with loopholes aligned with current windows.

== Description ==
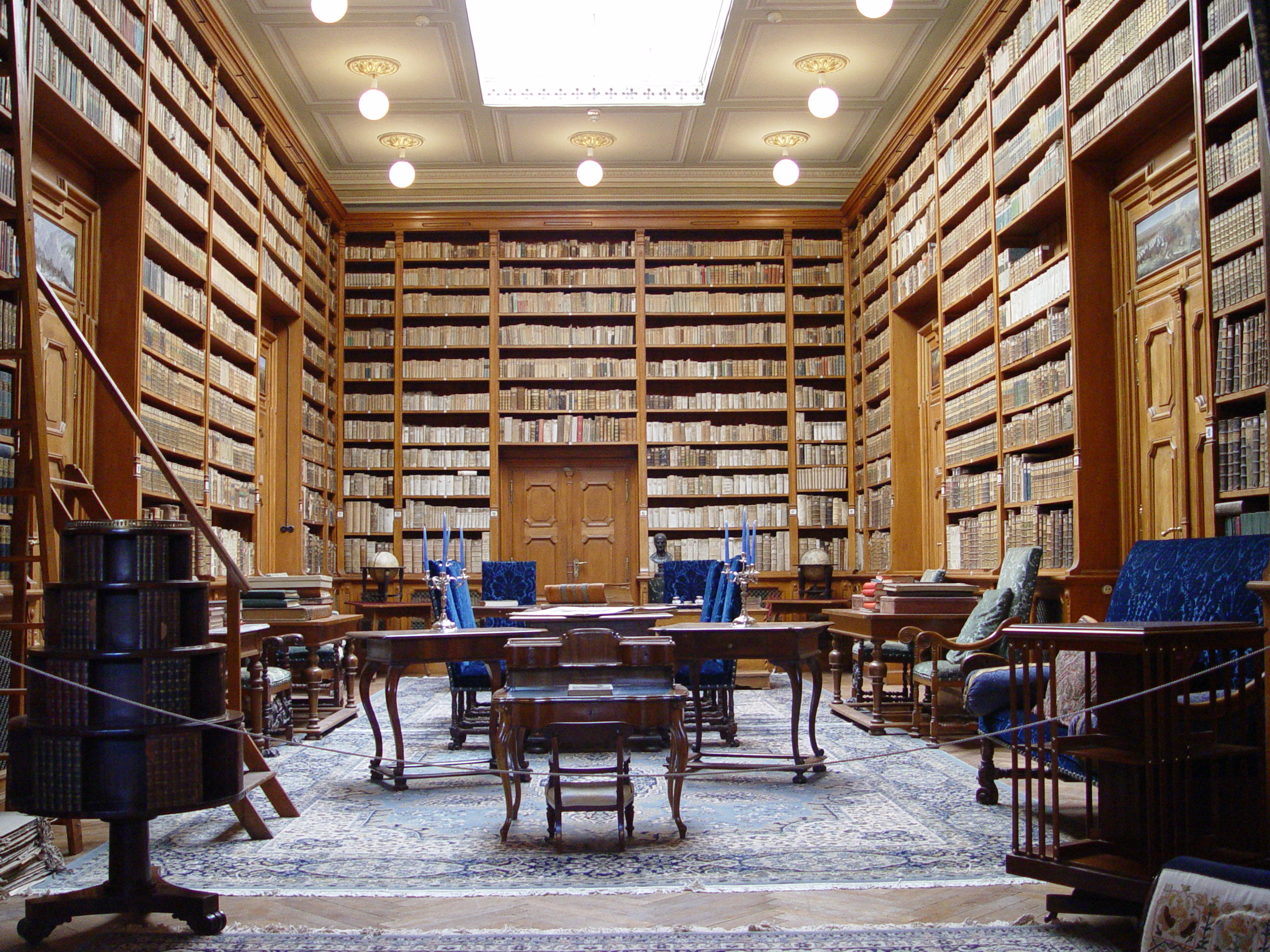
The manor's library, which contains around 15,000 books.

The manor is a two-storey building featuring four corner towers. Its southern facade is characterized by a flat bay, and all facades are adorned with semicircular windows, two of which are set in small balconies with latticework. The southern part of the mansion, originally the site of the castle, was a two-story structure with an inner courtyard, featuring five rooms on each floor and a wooden staircase. The perimeter walls of the ground floor had loopholes aligned with the current windows, and the entrance, located on the south side, retains a preserved Renaissance portal.

The mansion is unique in Slovakia for having preserved its original furnishings and collections after 1945. Its interior houses valuable historical furniture from various styles, paintings by prominent Hungarian and European artists, trophies, weapons, and exotic artifacts. The former county family apartments now host the permanent exhibition of the Andrássy Museum. The largest historical park in Slovakia also features a Roman waterfall, designed in 1823 by Josef Bergmann. At 9 meters high, it is the highest artificial waterfall and the first romantic structure in Slovakia. It was restored in October 2016 by the Andoras civic association.

== History ==
Originally, around 1441–1451, during conflicts in the territories of present-day Slovakia and raids led by John Jiskra, the Bebek family built a small fortress on their estate, which served as the core of the manor. During Turkish invasions (1532–1540), the estates became militarily threatened, prompting the construction of walls and later a block building by György Bebek. After the Bebek family, the estate was managed by castle captains and became part of the Krásná Hôrka castle estate, eventually acquired in hereditary ownership by the Andrássy family in the 17th century.

The building's early history is unclear, but records mention István Andrássy’s reconstruction of the residential building in the early 18th century. The manor was modest and was expanded and modified significantly between 1792–1795, including the addition of a park and a corridor connecting the park to the entrance. The Andrássy family owned the estate nearly continuously until 1945, with brief ownership by the Nádasdy, Pálffy, and Grovestins families. Count Emanuel I. of the Andrássy family, a notable figure in Hungarian cultural life, led a major reconstruction between 1881–1886, transforming the manor into a grand hunting lodge with improved guest accommodations and social spaces, including a large entrance hall with a preserved wooden coffered ceiling.

== Exhibitions ==
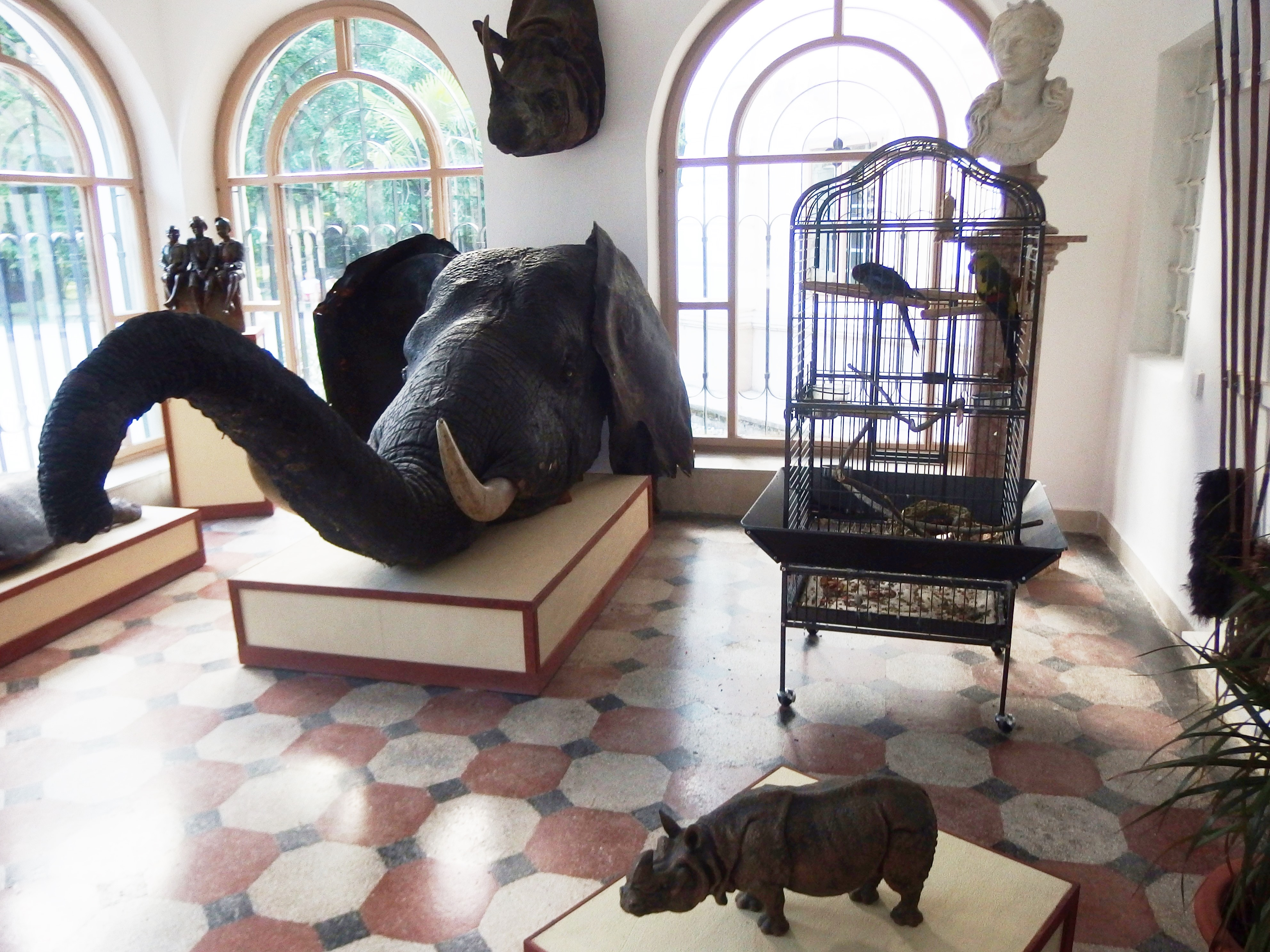
Elephant head exhibition

Within the manor is the Betliar Mansion Museum. After 1857, Count György Andrássy established a family museum from the original equipment of the castle, from the preserved weapons and equipment in several rooms. According to the entry in the first commemorative book from August 19, 1867, the museum was visited by Hungarian doctors and naturalists, participants of the All-Hungarian Congress in Košice.

The museum is most known for three artifacts, including two brought from abroad by Count Andrássy and displayed in the renovated winter garden. One of them is a well-preserved Egyptian mummy of Nebeja, believed to be a priest from around the 12th to 11th centuries BC, originating from Giza. Count Andrássy traveled extensively in 1849, visiting places like Egypt, Ceylon, and Borneo. The exhibition also includes a child’s mummy from the 5th-4th centuries BC, and a large elephant head.

== See also ==
- List of castles in Slovakia
