= Somogysárd =

- Village
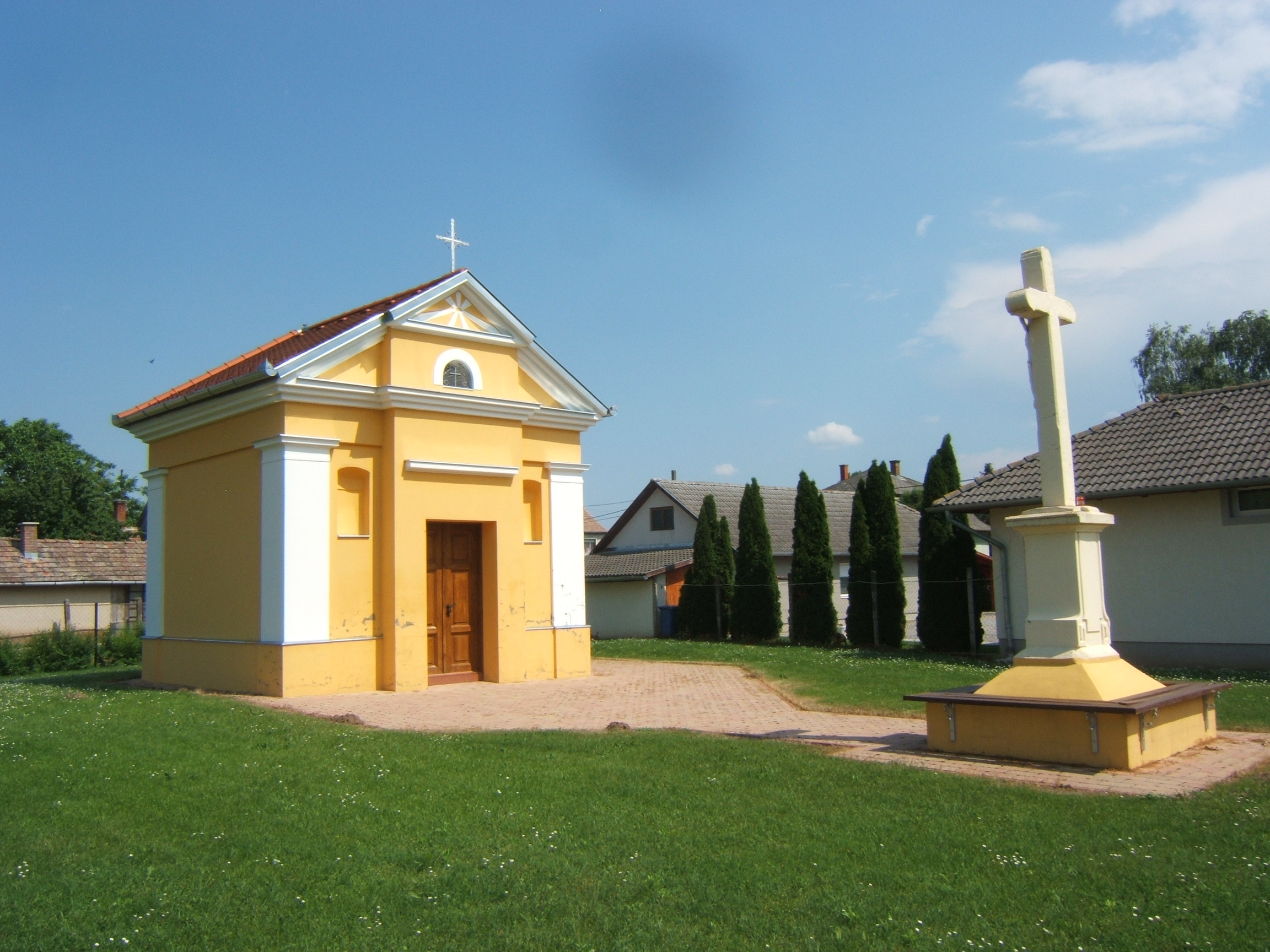
- Saint Roch Chapel with stone cross

- Coat of arms

- Location of Somogy county in Hungary

- Location of Somogysárd
- Coordinates: 46.41364°N 17.59683°E
- Country: Hungary
- Region: Southern Transdanubia
- County: Somogy
- District: Kaposvár
- RC Diocese: Kaposvár

Area
  - Total: 36.36 km^{2} (14.04 sq mi)

Population (2017)
  - Total: 1,175
  - Density: 32.32/km^{2} (83.70/sq mi)
- Demonym(s): sárdi, somogysárdi
- Time zone: UTC+1 (CET)
  - Summer (DST): UTC+2 (CEST)
- Postal code: 7435
- Area code: (+36) 82
- NUTS 3 code: HU232
- MP: József Attila Móring (KDNP)
- Website: Somogysárd Online

Somogysárd is a village in Somogy county, Hungary.

== History ==
It is the ancient estate of the Győr family, which passed to another owner during the 1346 class. In 1337 it already had a parish. In 1536, the widows of previous landlords became the owners of the village. In the Turkish treasury tax register of 1563, it's listed with only one house. In 1574, it consisted of 5 houses, and in 1580, 3 houses. Around 1701, it was owned by the Doby family, and before 1710, by the Simaházy family. In 1715, 14 households were registered in it. In 1752, Antal Somssich received a royal donation for it, along with the other estates and the surname Saárdi. Currently, Miklós Sárdi Somssich has the larger estate there. On April 1801, the village was granted a patent to hold national fairs.

The Somssich Castle in the village was built in the middle of the 18th century. It contains a library of about 3,000 volumes, many valuable old furniture, tapestries, etc. The Roman Catholic family church dates from 1757.

== Gallery ==
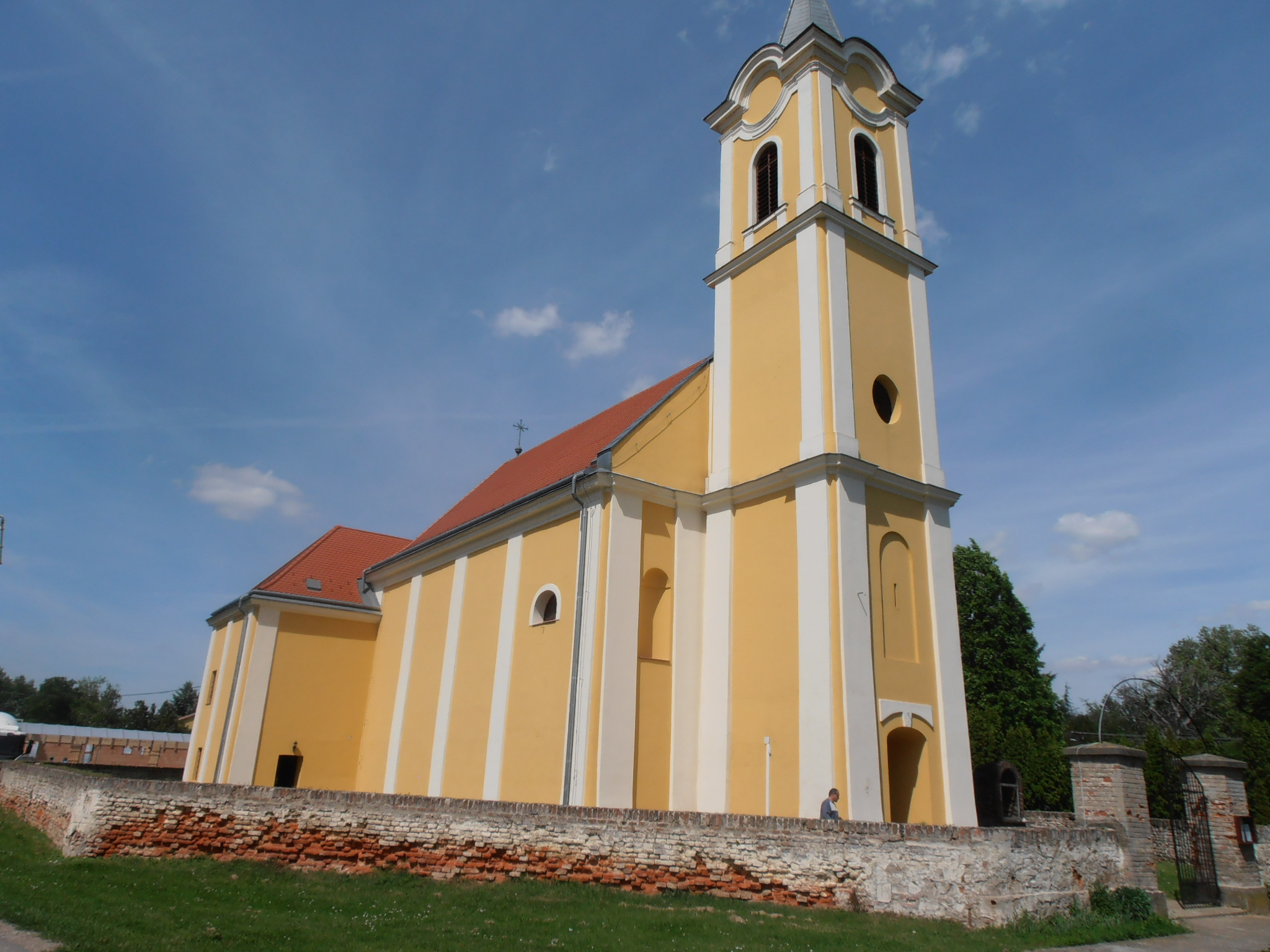
Holy Trinity Church in Somogysárd

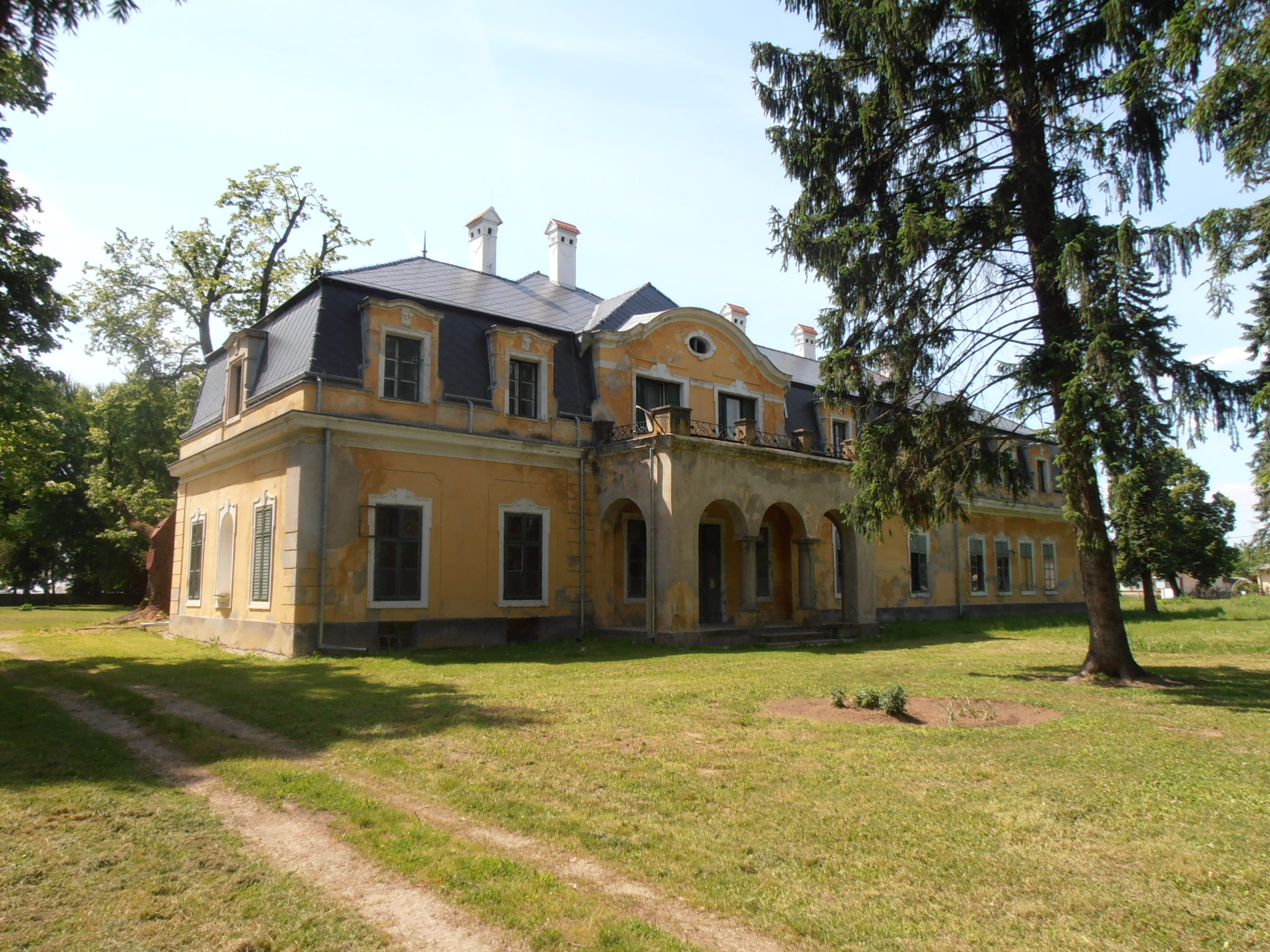
Somssich Mansion in Somogysárd

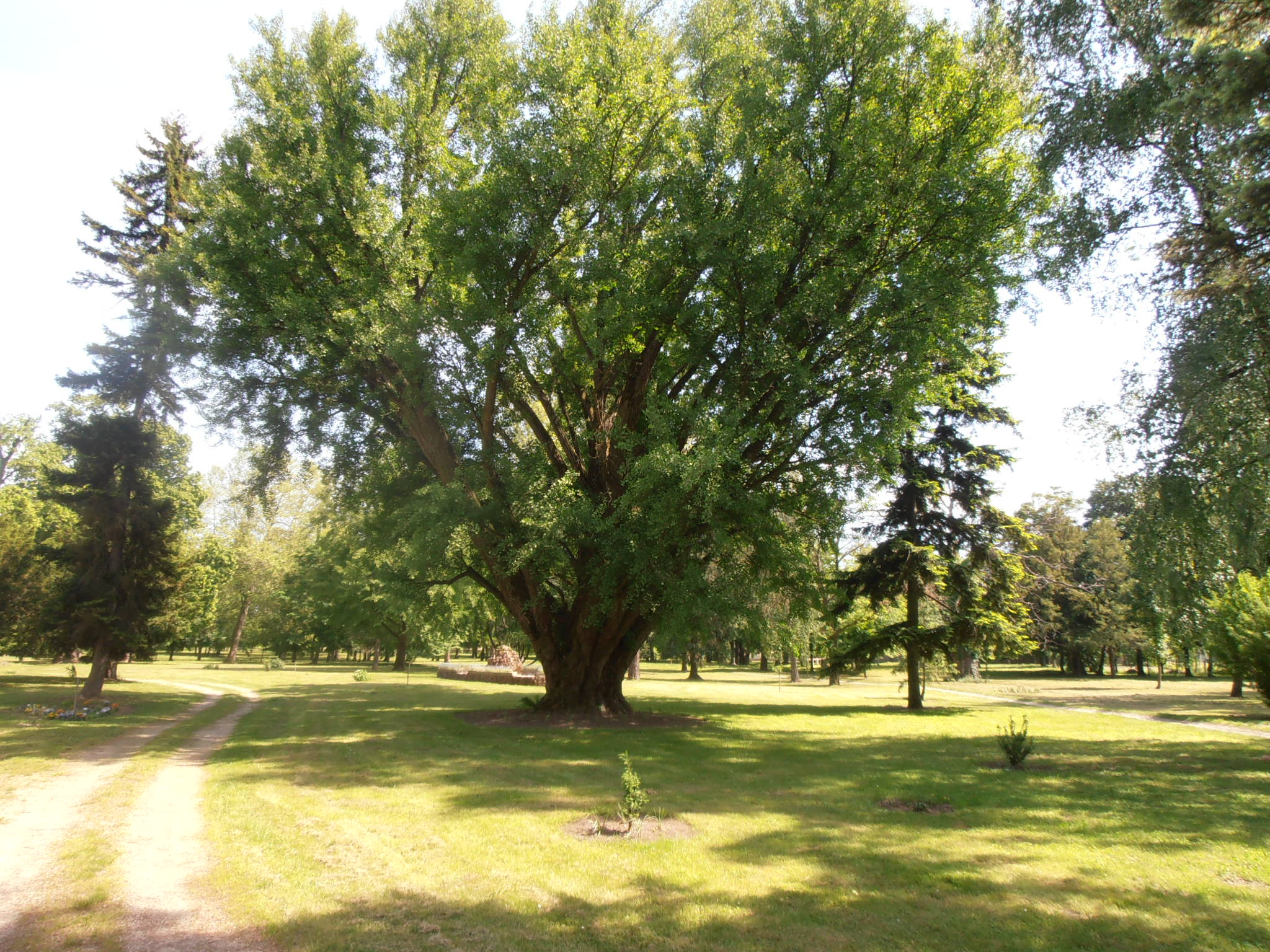
Park of the Somssich Mansion in Somogysárd

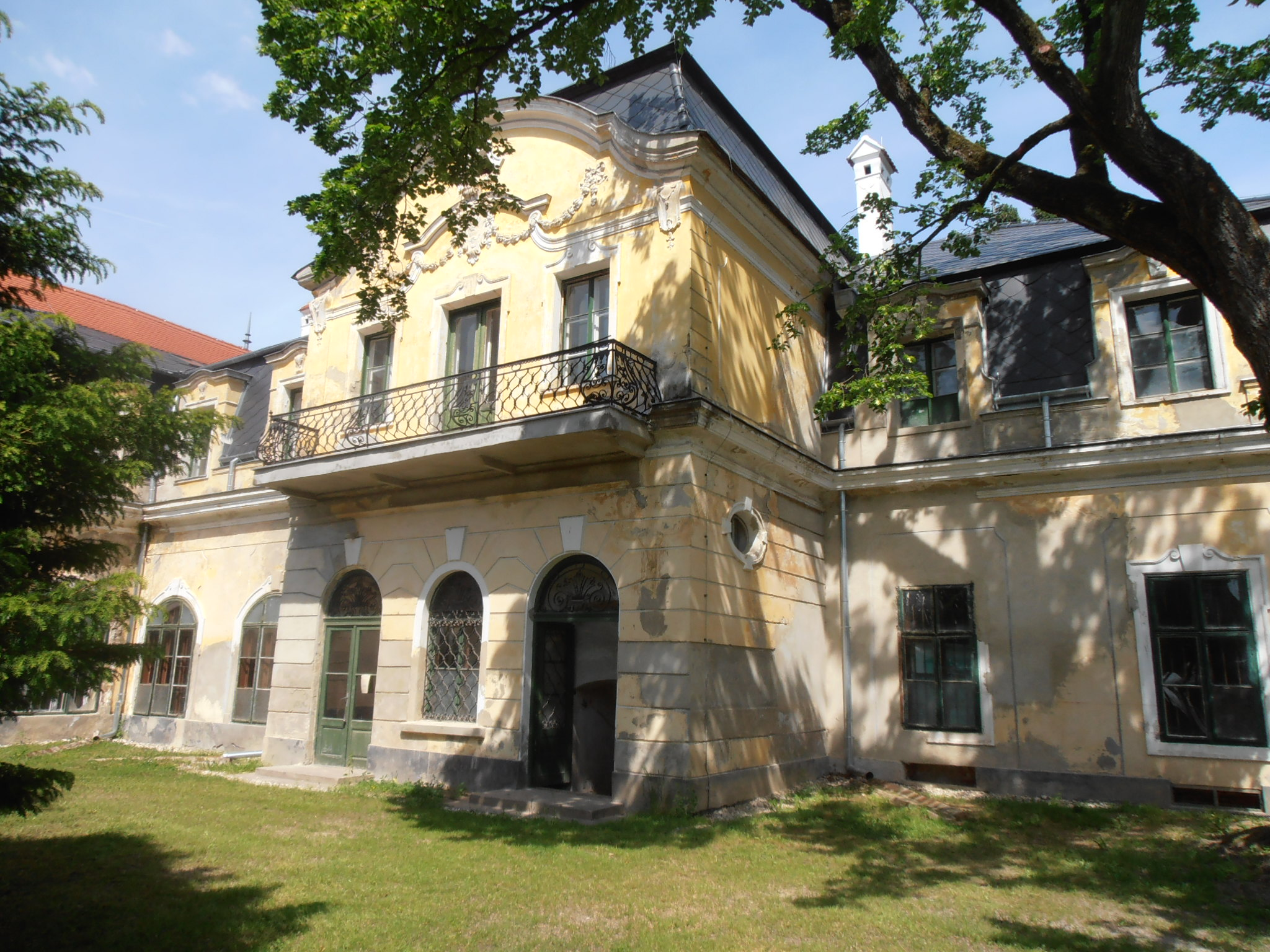
Somssich Mansion in Somogysárd
