= Szabolcs-Szatmár-Bereg County Assembly =

Szabolcs-Szatmár-Bereg County Assembly Szabolcs-Szatmár-Bereg Megyei Közgyűlés

Type
- Type: County Council

History
- Founded: 1990

Leadership
- President: Oszkár Seszták, Fidesz–KDNP since 3 April 2008

Structure
- Seats: 25 councillors
- Political groups: Administration: Fidesz–KDNP (18); Other parties (11): Jobbik-Momentum (3); MSZP (2); DK (1); Association for our County (1)
- Length of term: five years

Elections
- Last election: 13 October 2019
- Next election: 2024

Meeting place
- Nyíregyháza

Website
- szszbmo.hu

The Szabolcs-Szatmár-Bereg County Assembly (Hungarian: Szabolcs-Szatmár-Bereg Megyei Közgyűlés) is the local legislative body of Szabolcs-Szatmár-Bereg County in the Northern Great Plain, in Hungary.

== Composition ==
=== 2019–2024 period ===
The Assembly elected at the 2019 local government elections, is made up of 25 counselors, with the following party composition:

Party	Seats	Change	Group leader
Fidesz–KDNP	18 / 25	▲2	Oszkár Seszták
Jobbik-Momentum	3 / 25		Béla Adorján
Hungarian Socialist Party (MSZP)	2 / 25	▼1	János Veres
Democratic Coalition (DK)	1 / 25	New	László Farkas
Association for our County	1 / 25	0	László Helmeczy

After the elections in 2019 the Assembly controlled by the Fidesz–KDNP party alliance which has 18 councillors, versus 8 Jobbik-Hungarian Socialist Party (MSZP)-Momentum Movement-Everybody's Hungary Movement (MMM) and 3 Democratic Coalition (DK) councillors.

=== 2014–2019 period ===
The Assembly elected at the 2014 local government elections, is made up of 25 counselors, with the following party composition:

Party	Seats	Change	Group leader
Fidesz–KDNP	16 / 25	▲1	Oszkár Seszták
Jobbik	5 / 25	0	Béla Adorján
Hungarian Socialist Party (MSZP)	3 / 25	▼1	József Halmi
Association for our County	1 / 25	▼1	László Helmeczy

After the elections in 2014 the Assembly controlled by the Fidesz–KDNP party alliance which has 15 councillors, versus 5 Jobbik, 5 Hungarian Socialist Party (MSZP) and 1 Democratic Coalition (DK) and councillors.

=== 2010–2014 period ===
The Assembly elected at the 2010 local government elections, is made up of 26 counselors, with the following party composition:

Party	Seats	Group leader
Fidesz–KDNP	15 / 26	Oszkár Seszták
Jobbik	5 / 26	József Bakó
Hungarian Socialist Party (MSZP)	4 / 26	János Veres
Association for our County	2 / 26	László Helmeczy

After the elections in 2010 the Assembly controlled by the Fidesz–KDNP party alliance which has 15 councillors, versus 5 Jobbik, 4 Hungarian Socialist Party (MSZP) and 2 Hungarian Socialist Party (MSZP)councillors.

== Presidents of the Assembly ==
So far, the presidents of the Szabolcs-Szatmár-Bereg County Assembly have been:

- 1990–1998 József Medgyesi
- 1994–1998 József Zilahi, County Election Coalition (FKgP-KDNP-VP-MDF)
- 1999–2002 László Helmeczy, Fidesz-MDF-MKDSZ, and Independent after 2000
- 2002–2006 László Gazda, Hungarian Socialist Party (MSZP)
- 2006–2008 István Fülöp, Fidesz–KDNP
- since 2008 Oszkár Seszták, Fidesz–KDNP
