= Tiszadob =

- Village
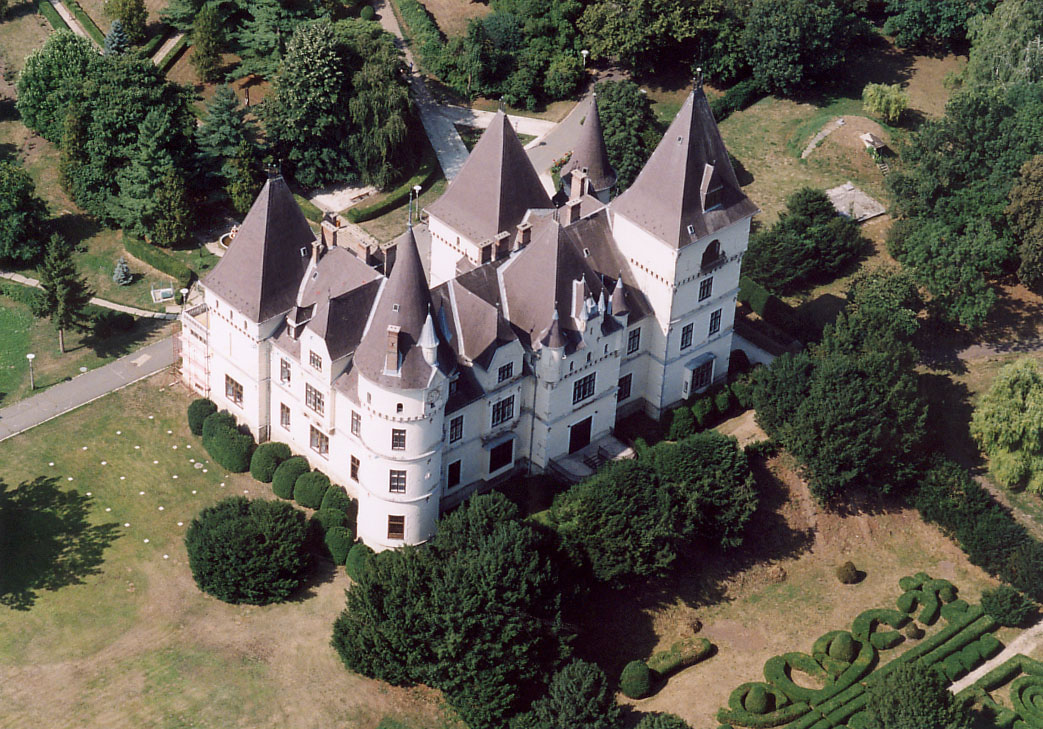
- Andrássy castle in Tiszadob

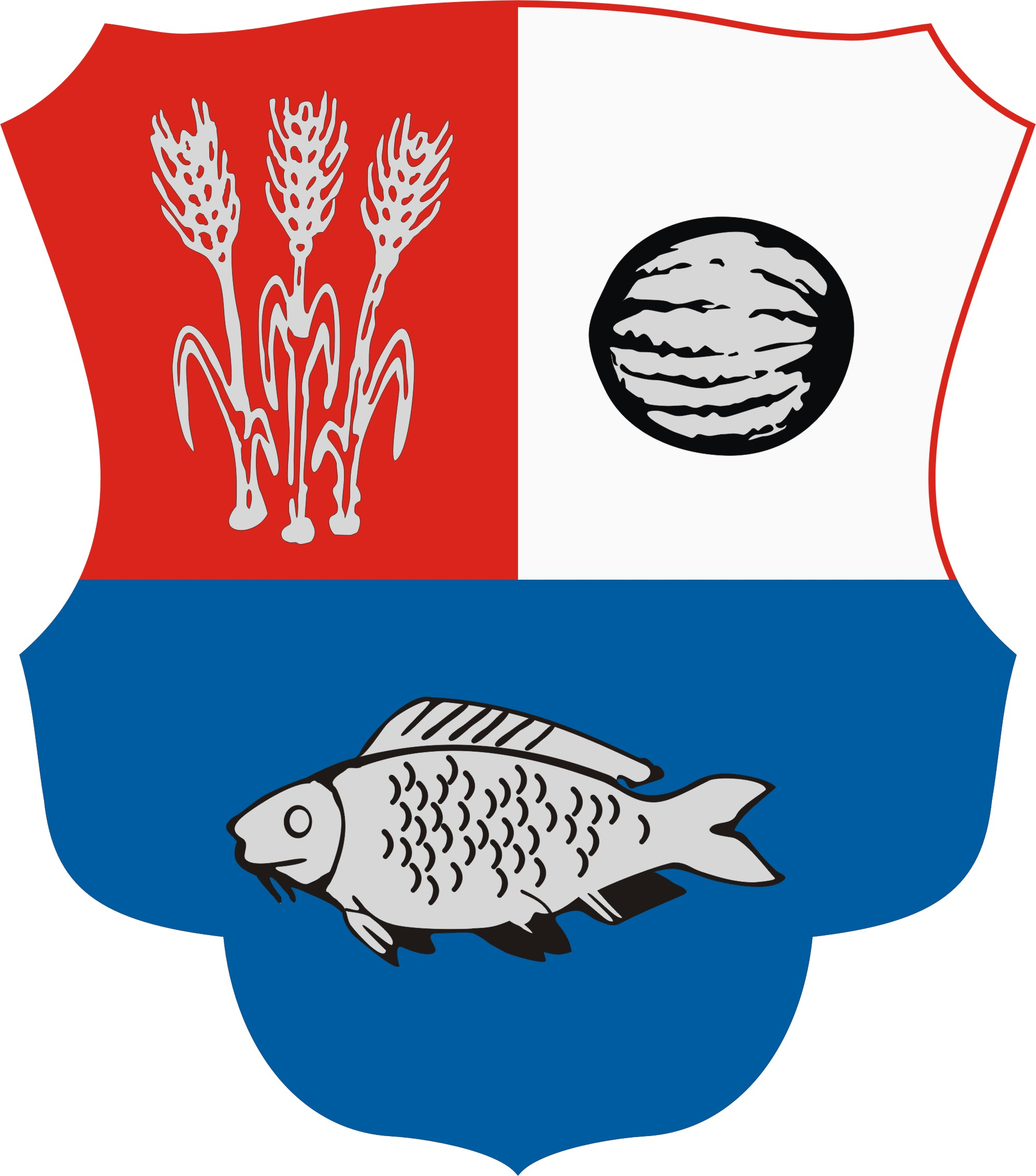
- Coat of arms

- Location within Hungary
- Coordinates: 48°00′25″N 21°10′10″E
- Country: Hungary
- County: Szabolcs-Szatmár-Bereg

Area
  - Total: 82.60 km^{2} (31.89 sq mi)

Population (2001)
  - Total: 3,341
  - Density: 40.52/km^{2} (104.9/sq mi)
- Time zone: UTC+1 (CET)
  - Summer (DST): UTC+2 (CEST)
- Postal code: 4456
- Area code: 42
- Website: http://tiszadob.hu

Tiszadob is a village in Szabolcs-Szatmár-Bereg county, in the Northern Great Plain region of eastern Hungary.

== Geography ==
It covers an area of 82.60 km^{2} (32 sq mi) and has a population of 3,341 people (2001).

== Nobility ==
The families of notable Hungarian nobility that are known to have lived in Tiszadob, at some point in time between 1786 and 1895, include: Andrássy, Balogh, Batta, Doby, Görgei, Lakatos, Székes, Tóth and Zákány.

== History ==
Tiszadob and its surroundings were inhabited before the Hungarian conquest of the Carpathian Basin. Archeological excavations in the vicinity revealed traces of Bronze Age and Sarmatian cemeteries, and traces of a Csörsz ditch and a hillfort were found on the outskirts of the village.

The settlement first appears in writing in 1220, in the Oradea Register, and it is later mentioned in a 1336 document. The village was a royal estate for a long time, and then the property of the Dob branch of the Gutkeled clan. In 1430, King Sigismund donated it to the diocese of Eger.

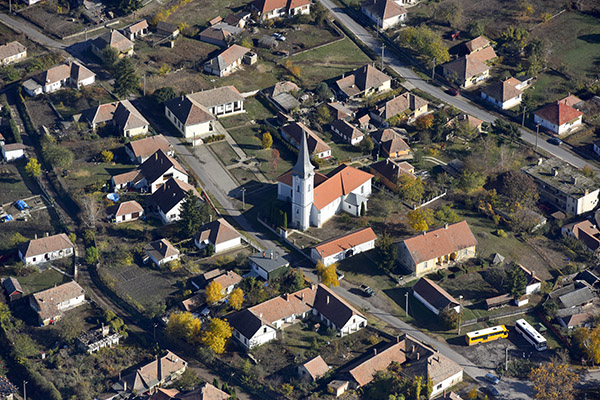
Tiszadob, Hungary

The settlement was among the estates of the Báthori family since 1588. It was raided by the Ottoman Empire in the mid 17th century. From the end of the 17th century the village belonged to Ferenc Rákóczi II and his sister, however, after Hungary's failed 1848 Revolution, this estate was confiscated from the Rákóczi family.

It was bought by Ferenc Károlyi in 1746, and then (through marriage) the village and its surroundings became the property of the Andrássy family. Count István Széchenyi made the first hoeing here in Tiszadob in 1846, symbolizing the beginning of the regulation of the Tisza. The participants of this famous event are reminded of the monument erected here by István Széchenyi, Gyula Andrássy and Pál Vásárhelyi.

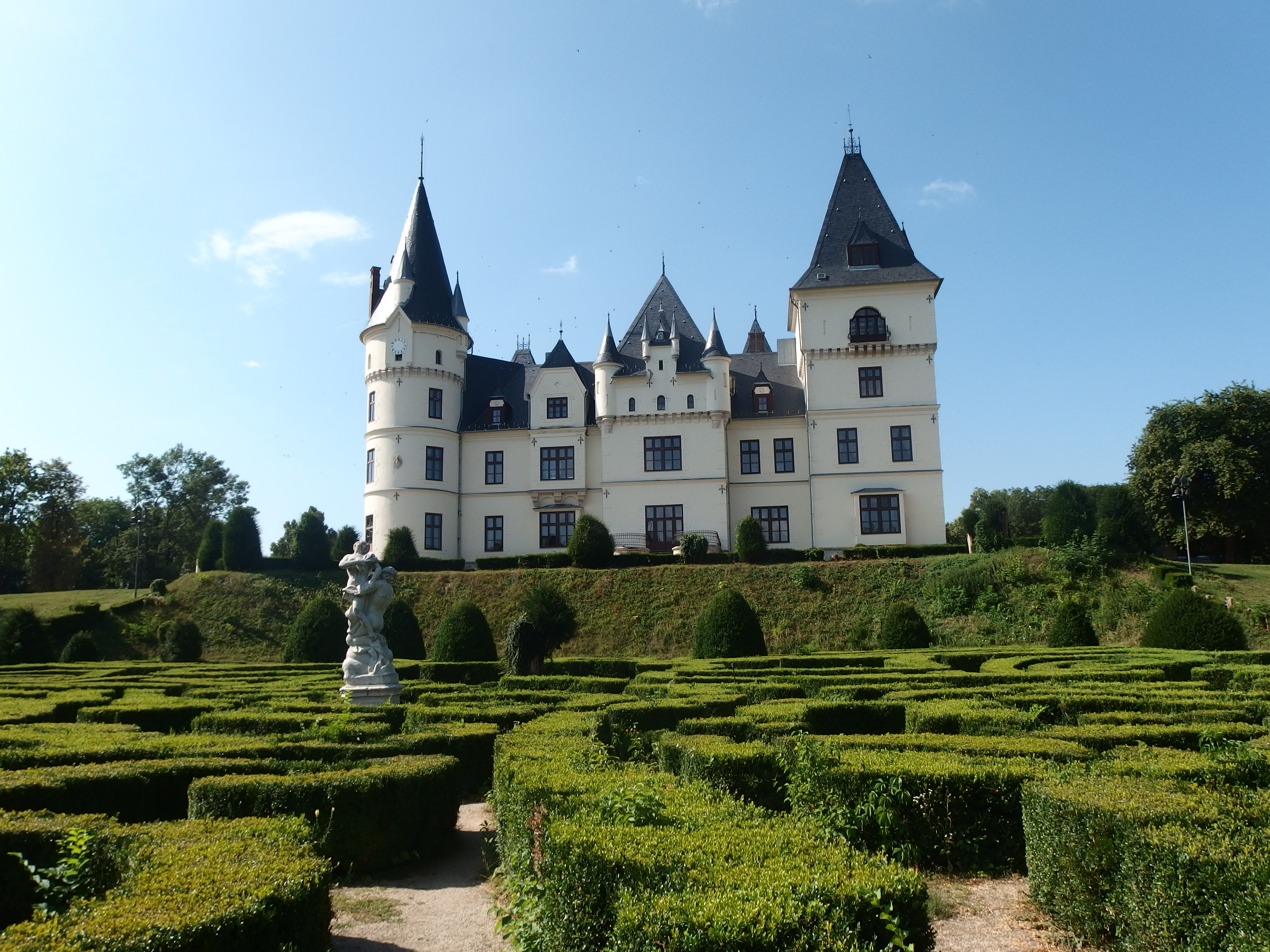
Andrássy Castle - Tiszadob, Hungary

The castle of Count Andrássy in Tiszadob was built by Gyula Andrássy, the first foreign minister of the Austro-Hungarian Monarchy, between 1880-1885. The English garden behind the castle was also established at that time.

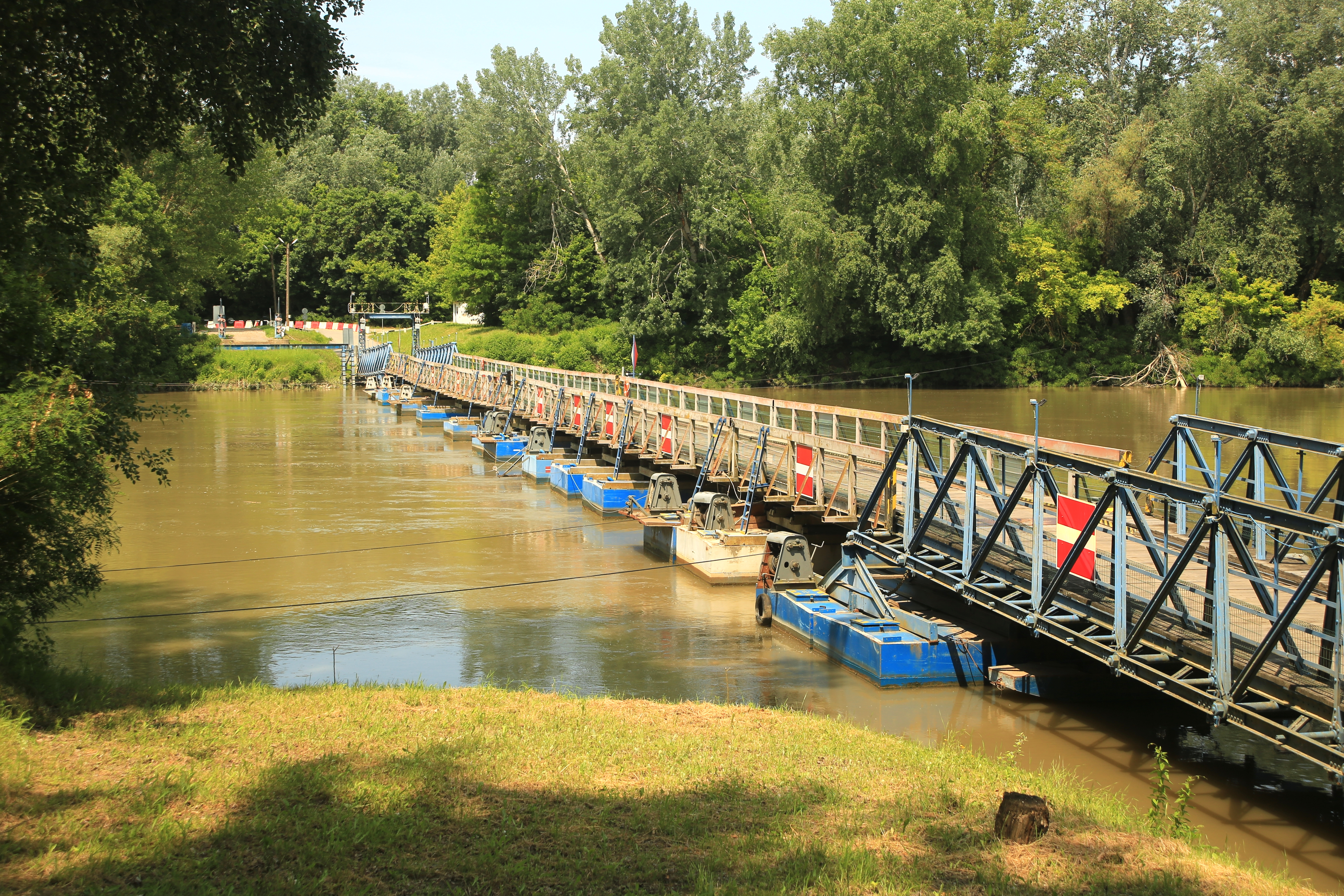
Ponton bridge in Tiszadob

Count Sándor Andrássy, Member of Parliament, was the last owner of the castle and the huge estate. After 1945, the castle and the Andrássy estate were nationalized. The two sons of Sándor Andrássy, Count Imre Andrássy (1891-1985) and Count Mihály Andrássy (1893-1990) were forced to leave the country. The first died in the United States and the second in Canada. The area of the park of Andrássy Castle in Tiszadob decreased after the Second World War, currently 15 cadastral moons. The castle was turned into an orphanage.

During the Second World War the nobleman member of the family Farkas de Boldogfa, Endre Farkas de Boldogfa, Major of the General Staff of the Hungarian royal army and his wife Ms. Klára Lenz, were landwoners on Tiszadob (1,154 hectares belonged to Tiszadob, 422 belonged to Kesznyéten). After the Second World War, the Counts Andrássy were explelled from Tiszadob and lost they property rights over the castle and the lands. The noble family Farkas de Boldogfa suffered the same fate as the Counts Andrássy.

== Demographics ==
As of 2022, the town was 88.7% Hungarian, 4.4% Romani. The population was 13.3% Reformed, and 7.8% Roman Catholic.

== See also ==
- Andrássy Castle
