= Dobie (name) =

Dobie is both a surname and a given name. Notable people with the name include:

Surname:

- Alan Dobie (born 1932), British actor
- Armistead Mason Dobie (1881–1962), law professor and United States federal judge
- Beatrix Dobie (1887-1945), New Zealand artist
- Don Dobie (1927–1996), politician
- Gil Dobie (1878–1948), footballer
- Hector Dobie (1860–1954), politician
- J. Frank Dobie (1888–1964), American folklorist
- Jamie Dobie (born 2001) Scottish international rugby union player
- Mark Dobie (born 1963), footballer
- Richard Dobie (1731–1805), fur trader
- Scott Dobie (born 1978), footballer

Given name, nickname or stage name:

- Dobie Gillis Williams (1961–1999), criminal
- Dobie Gray (born 1940–2011), American singer-songwriter born Lawrence Darrow Brown
- Walter Dobie Moore (1890–1963), American baseball player in the Negro leagues

Fictional characters:

- Dobie Gillis, the protagonist of a series of short stories and novels by author Max Shulman, and of the film and TV series adapted from those works

== See also ==
- Doby, a surname
