= Betliar =

- Municipality
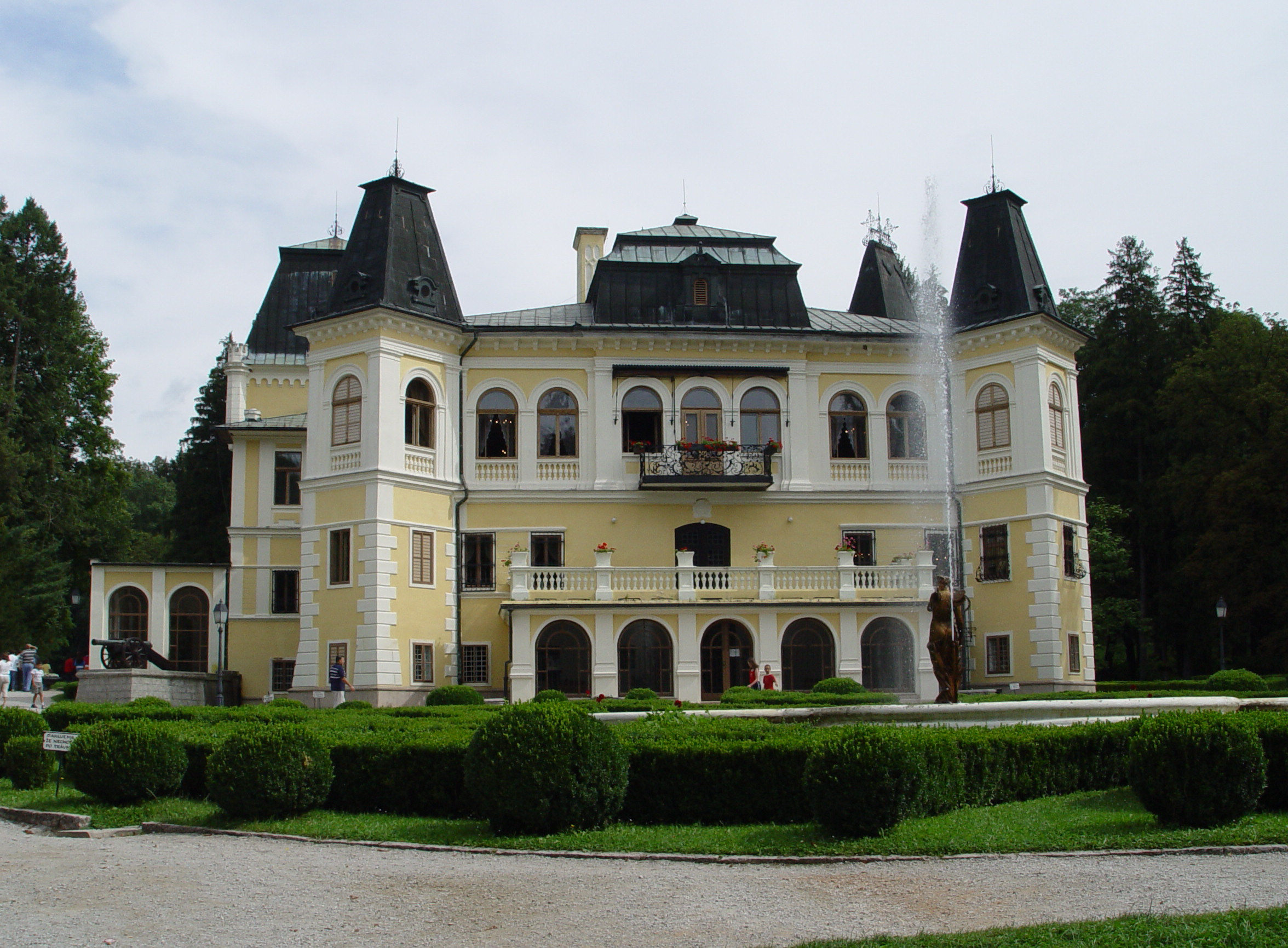
- Betliar Manor House

- Flag

- Location of Betliar in the Košice Region Location of Betliar in Slovakia
- Coordinates: 48.70°N 20.52°E
- Country: Slovakia
- Region: Košice Region
- District: Rožňava District
- First mentioned: 1330

Area
  - Total: 24.66 km^{2} (9.52 sq mi)
- Elevation: 343 m (1,125 ft)

Population (2025)
  - Total: 907
- Time zone: UTC+1 (CET)
  - Summer (DST): UTC+2 (CEST)
- Postal code: 492 1
- Area code: +421 58
- Vehicle registration plate (until 2022): RV
- Website: www.obecbetliar.sk

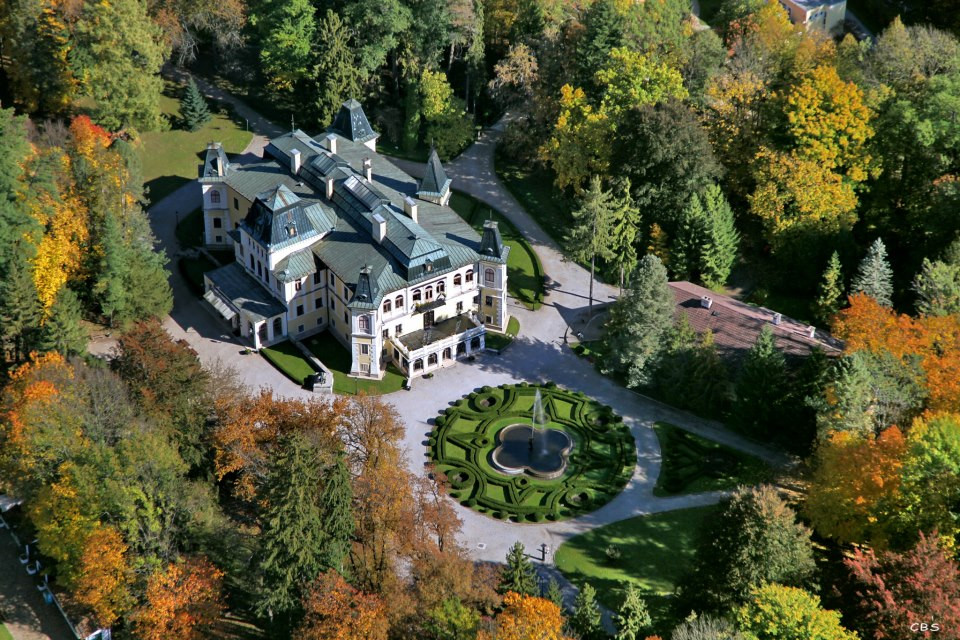
Aerial view of the Manor House

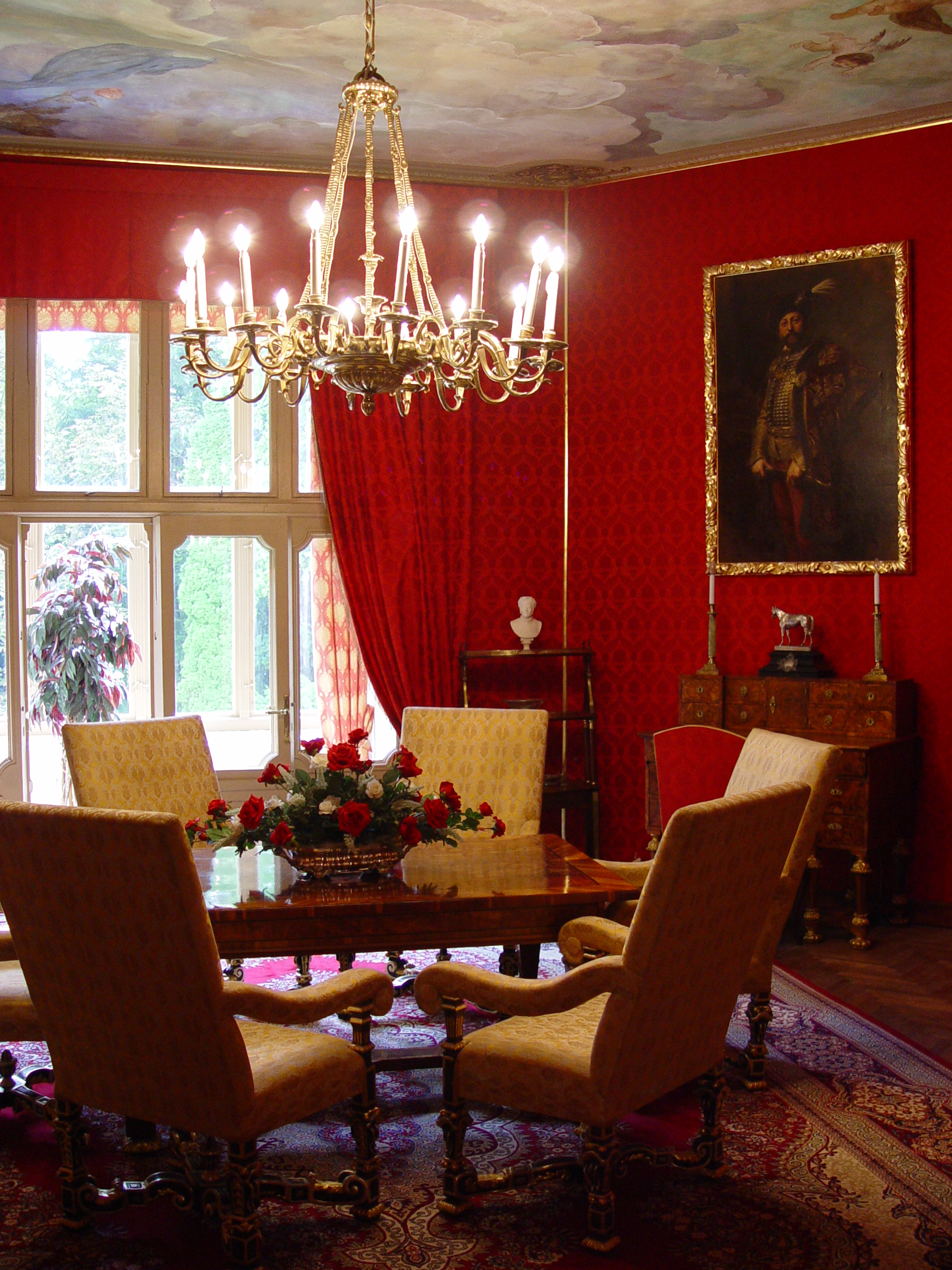
Betliar Manor House

Betliar (Hungarian: Betlér) is a village and municipality in the Rožňava District in the Košice Region of eastern Slovakia, known for its manor house.

== Geography ==
The municipality lies at an altitude of 343 metres (1,125 ft) and covers an area of 24.66 km^{2} (9.52 sq mi) (2025). It is situated in South-East part of Slovenské rudohorie in valley of river Slaná, 5 km north of town Rožňava.

== History ==
The village of Betliar lies in a valley of the river Slaná, 5 km northwest of Rožňava. The first written description of the village is from the year 1330, when it is mentioned under the name Bethler (the term is of German origin meaning a cart used in copper mining). It belonged to the Bebek Hungarian noble family (of the Ákos genus) and later the Andrássy family. The inhabitants lived on mining, agriculture and forestry.

Before the establishment of independent Czechoslovakia in 1918, Betliar was part of Gömör and Kishont County within the Kingdom of Hungary. From 1939 to 1945, it was part of the Slovak Republic.

The mining heritage of the village and the natural environment of the Volovské vrchy (hills) has made Betliar into a tourist destination.

The most well-known place in the village is the Betliar Mansion, built on the site of a small Bebek's castle from the 15th century. It is situated in an English-style park, designed by the architect H. Nebbiem. The mansion has been rebuilt many times, most recently by the Hungarian Andrássy family in the year 1880. Since that time its appearance has been preserved with minor changes and renovations; currently it serves as an exposition of the Slovak National Museum.

In the year 1985 it was declared a national cultural monument. Of particular interest among sacral sights is a classicist evangelical church from the year 1794. Originally it was built without a tower, which was later added in the year 1834.

The Roman-Catholic church of Saint Elisabeth has an even older history. It was built in the first half of the 14th century in a Gothic style. In the 17th and 19th century it was reconstructed.

The history of Betliar is also connected with many people, such as the writer Ján Fabricius.

In the village there is accommodation available in hotels, pensions, lodging houses and private homes.

Village was appeared like mining colony in the late 13th century. There were mined gold, iron and copper. In the 15th century there came Walachian people. In the 18th century was rise of mining and in Betliar was blast-furnace and rolling mill. The heraldry of village appeared in 16th century and on this heraldry depicts renaissance shield with two ploughshares, share and vomer. Nowadays in actual heraldry is historical heraldry situated above manor house.

== Population ==
Population statistic (10 years)
Year	1995	2005	2015	2025
Count	975	955	953	907
Difference		−2.05%	−0.20%	−4.82%

Population statistic
Year	2024	2025
Count	917	907
Difference		−1.09%

It has a population of 907 people (31 December 2025).

=== Ethnicity ===
Census 2021 (1+ %)
Ethnicity	Number	Fraction
Slovak	877	95.01%
Not found out	26	2.81%
Hungarian	23	2.49%
Romani	22	2.38%
Total	923	

In year 2021 was 923 people by ethnicity 877 as Slovak, 26 as Not found out, 23 as Hungarian, 22 as Romani, 7 as Other, 4 as German, 3 as Italian, 3 as English, 2 as Czech, 2 as Ukrainian, 2 as Rusyn, 1 as Russian, 1 as Austrian and 1 as Moravian.

Note on population: The difference values of population numbers in the table "Population statistic" and in the sections "Ethnicity" & "Religion" is caused by the use of various statistical methods.

=== Religion ===
Census 2021 (1+ %)
Religion	Number	Fraction
None	460	49.84%
Evangelical Church	233	25.24%
Roman Catholic Church	173	18.74%
Not found out	23	2.49%
Greek Catholic Church	13	1.41%
Total	923	

In year 2021 was 923 people by religion 460 from None, 233 from Evangelical Church, 173 from Roman Catholic Church, 23 from Not found out, 13 from Greek Catholic Church, 5 from Ad hoc movements, 4 from Jehovah's Witnesses, 3 from Calvinist Church, 2 from Other, 1 from Old Catholic Church, 1 from Paganism and natural spirituality, 1 from Christian Congregations in Slovakia, 1 from Hinduism, 1 from United Methodist Church, 1 from Seventh-day Adventist Church and 1 from Buddhism.

== Monuments ==
- Manor house: It was appeared like forward fortification of Krásna Hôrka castle. Core of manor house was built in the 15th century. István Andrássy began a change of this building on luxury formal residence. Manor house was rebuilt on three- storey hunter manor house and today is his appearance relatively similar. Exposition of manor house create: collection of works of art, historical furniture, unique library, weapons, precious ceramics, glass and porcelain. There are also hunting trophies from huntings from home and in foreign countries and various objects like eskimo clothes and armament of samurai brought from far journeys. It is also home to the mummified remains of an Egyptian man possibly named Nebey who lived during the Eighteenth Dynasty of Egypt. In 1985 manor house in Betliar was promulgated on national cultural monument. Around the manor house is a unique natural park, which was in a 1978 write-in list of important historical gardens of the world. In this park are infrequent woody plants from foreign countries and also native oaks and spruces.
- Roman Catholic church: Is the oldest monument in Betliar. It is from the first half of the 14th century, and in the 17th and 19th centuries it was customized. The church has a gothic origin; the tower of the church was built in the 17th century. From the baroque period there are a wood pulpit from the 18th century with sculptures of the Evangelists and a wood sculpture of Madonna Queen from the 18th century. On the great altar from the 19th century is a painting of Saint Elizabeth.
- Evangelic church: Was built in 1786, classicistic tower of church was built in 1826. Church have brick column altar with painting Christ and Samaritan by the water well from 1838. Church affected fires and in 1856 burn out. Immediately after was again built up.

== People of consequence ==
- Emanuel (Manó) Andrássy (3.3.1821 - 23.4.1891): Hungarian politician, entrepreneur, count, Gömör district administrator. He managed family enterprises, he traveled in Europe and he was in some countries in Asia. He liked hunting; trophies from his hunting voyages are part of exposition of manor house.
- Fabricius Ján (Fabricius János, 1672–1734): Was distinguished Slovak intellectual. He was born in Betliar. He studied in Štítnik, Rožňava, Pressburg. After, he studied theology, philosophy, history and languages in Wittenberg.
- Kazamek Juraj (1882–1956): Violinist, chapel-master, music composer. Due to difficult living conditions left his family to USA. In Pittsburg he worked with his father the mines. At fourteen he became member of a mining band. After, he studied violin at New York's School of Music, in France and Germany.
- Koššuth Július (1882–1953): Was establisher of funeral supporting association in Slovakia. In 1928 appeared in Betliar funeral supporting association, were accredited program, statutes. In 1929 the Department of Home Affairs in Prague accredited statutes of this association. He was the first clerk of funeral supporting association.

== Genealogical resources ==
The records for genealogical research are available at the state archive "Statny Archiv in Kosice, Slovakia"

- Romancatholic church records (births/marriages/deaths): 1777-1893 (parish B)
- Lutheran church records (births/marriages/deaths): 1827-1947 (parish A)

== See also ==
- List of municipalities and towns in Slovakia
