= István Andrássy (author) =

Hungarian author and nobleman (15??–16??)

Baron István Andrássy de Csíkszentkirály et Krasznahorka (16th century – 17th century) was a Hungarian author and nobleman. He was a member of the old aristocrat Andrássy family.

His work is mentioned in the catalog of the library of Sigismund Rákóczi, Prince of Transylvania: Stephani Andrássy triplex Philosophia. The book itself did not survive.
