= Sâncrăieni =

Sâncrăieni Csíkszentkirály
- Commune
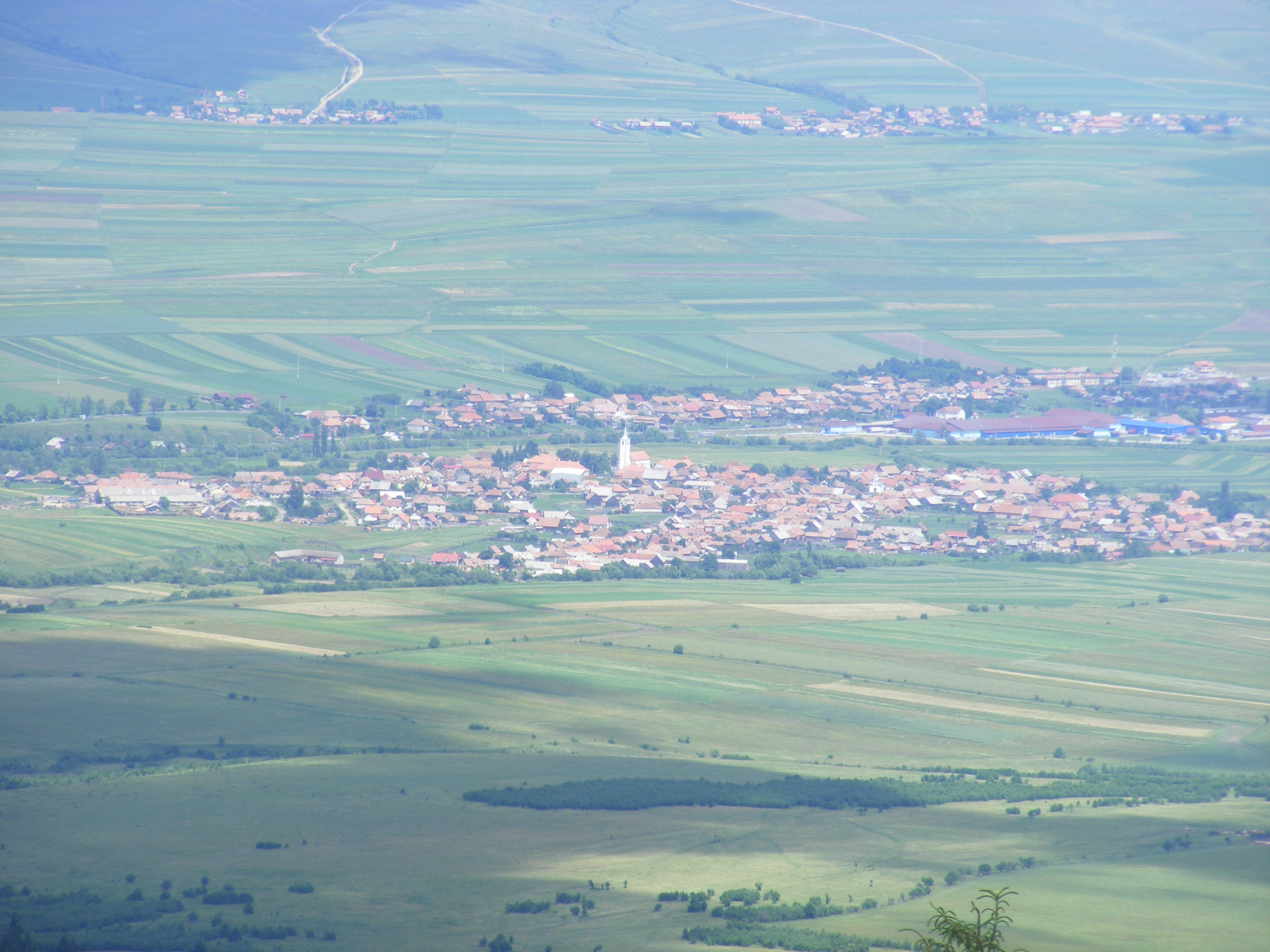
- View of the village

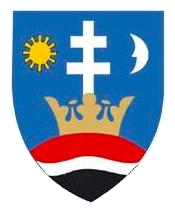
- Coat of arms

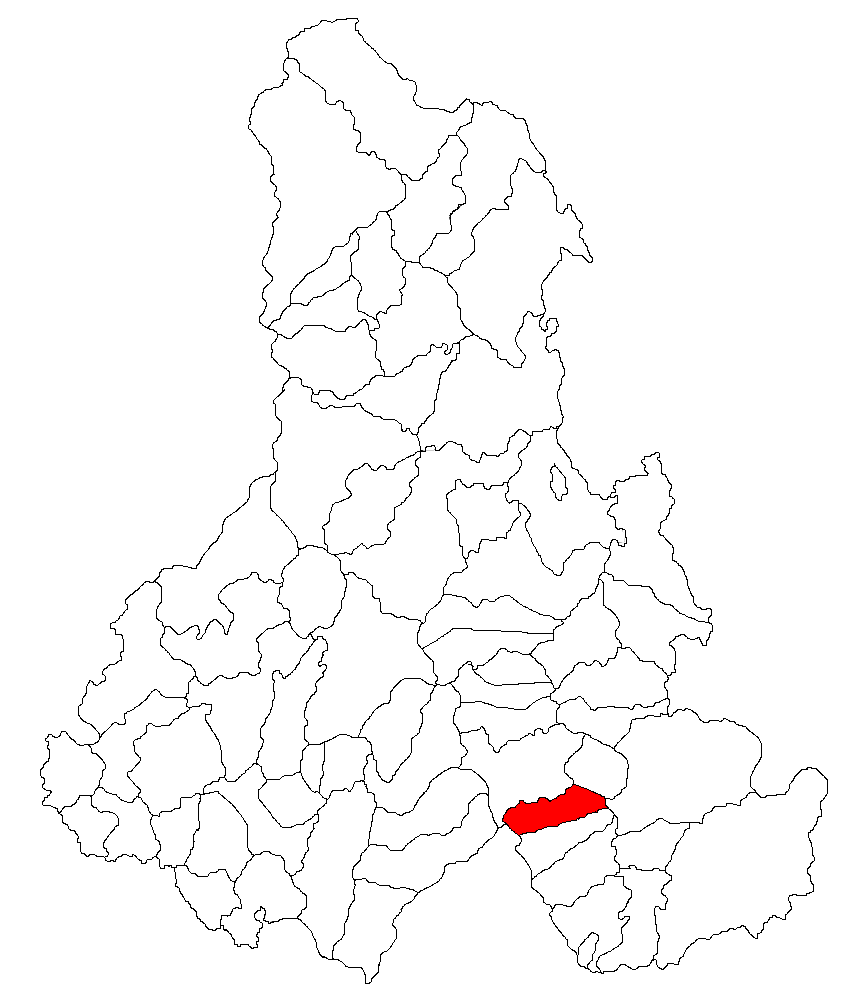
- Location in Harghita County

- Location in Romania
- Coordinates: 46°18′48″N 25°50′22″E
- Country: Romania
- County: Harghita

Government
  - Mayor (2020–2024): Ernő Székely (UDMR)
- Area: 53.30 km^{2} (20.58 sq mi)
- Population (2021-12-01): 2,476
  - Density: 46.45/km^{2} (120.3/sq mi)
- Time zone: UTC+02:00 (EET)
  - Summer (DST): UTC+03:00 (EEST)
- Postal code: 537265
- Area code: +40 266
- Vehicle reg.: HR
- Website: www.csikszentkiraly.ro

Sâncrăieni (Hungarian: Csíkszentkirály or colloquially Szentkirály, Hungarian pronunciation: [ˈtʃiːksɛnkiraːj], German: Heilkönig, both meaning "holy king" and referring to King St Stephen of Hungary) is a commune in Harghita County, Romania. Composed of a single village, Sâncrăieni, it lies in the Székely Land, an ethno-cultural region in eastern Transylvania. The former Romanian name was Ciuc-Sâncraiu.

== Geography ==
The village is situated on the two banks of the Olt River at the northernmost end of the Lower Ciuc Basin 7 km from Miercurea Ciuc. It lies just in front of the Jigod pass which divides the Ciuc basin into its upper and lower part. The village is bounded by the foothills of the Ciuc Mountains in the east and by the Harghita range in the west.

== Demographics ==
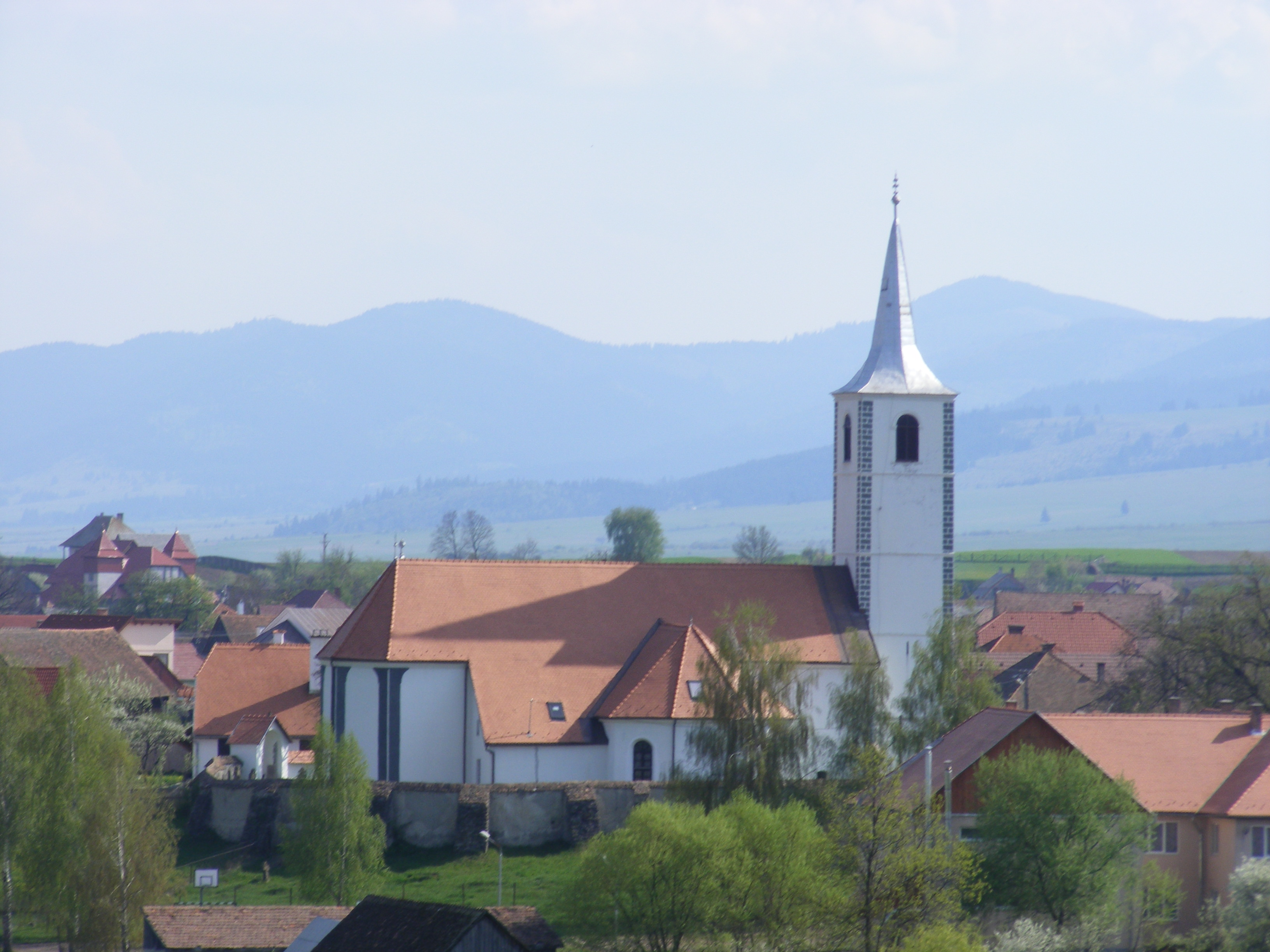
The Roman Catholic parish church

The commune has an absolute Székely Hungarian majority. According to the 2002 census it had a population of 6,194 of which 98.13% or 6,078 were Hungarian. In Sâncrăieni proper, the 2002 census reported a population of 2478, with 97.41% of the respondents (2414 persons) being Hungarians.

As to religion, 97.48% of the respondents was reported to be Roman Catholic, 1.1% Reformed Protestant and 0.98% Eastern Orthodox.

The commune is composed of a single village, Sâncrăieni.

- Since 2004 Leliceni forms an independent commune with the villages of Fitod (Fitód), Hosasău (Hosszúaszó) and Misentea (Csíkmindszent).
- Since 2004 Sântimbru has formed an independent commune with the village and resort of Sântimbru-Băi (Szentimrefürdő).

== History ==
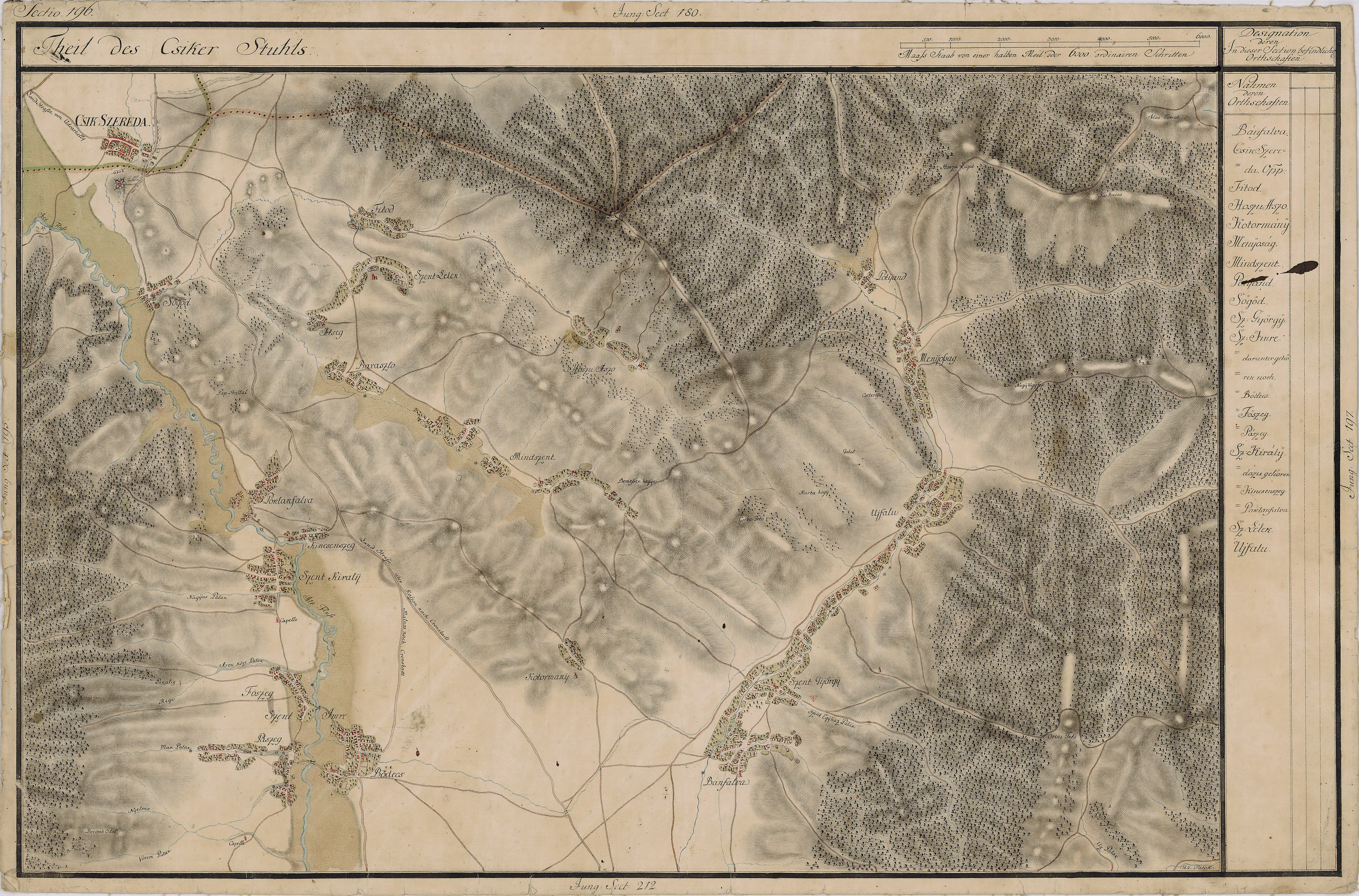
As Szent Kiraly on a historical map (Josephinische Landaufnahme, 1769-1773)

The area of the village has been inhabited since ancient times. Excavations revealed finds from the Stone Age, Bronze Age and Iron Age. In 1954, in a nearby andesite mine a Dacian silver treasure and a drinking set was found. In the Sütőkert diggings revealed traces of a settlement from the era of the Árpád dynasty.

In the papal tithe register of 1332-1337, the village was mentioned by the name of Sanctus Rex as a settlement having a parish. However, the village is thought to be much older as naming villages as 'Holy King' was practiced in the Kingdom of Hungary only between 1083, the year of the canonizations of Stephen I of Hungary, and 1192 when another king, king St Ladislaus was also canonised. Given that Hungary had already two holy kings, this naming practice was abandoned as it could lead to ambiguity.

In 1566, the village was mentioned in Hungarian as Zent Kyraly, in 1614 as Szentkirály. In 1760–2, its name was recorded as Csik Szent Királly. Its Romanian name derives from the Hungarian and was originally Ciuc-Sâncraiu.

The settlement was historically part of the Székely Land area of Transylvania and administratively belonged to Csíkszék district until the administrative reform of Transylvania in 1876, when it fell within Csík County in the Kingdom of Hungary. Between 1762 and 1851, the village provided recruits for the 3rd Company of the First Székely Infantry Regiment. After the Treaty of Trianon of 1920, it became part of Romania and fell within Ciuc County during the interwar period. In 1940, the second Vienna Award granted the Northern Transylvania to Hungary and it was held by Hungary until 1944. After Soviet occupation, the Romanian administration returned and the town became officially part of Romania in 1947. Between 1952 and 1960, the commune fell within the Magyar Autonomous Region, between 1960 and 1968 the Mureș-Magyar Autonomous Region. In 1968, the province was abolished, and since then, the commune has been part of Harghita County.

The famous Hungarian noble family, the Counts Andrássy de Csíkszentkirály et Krasznahorka originated in the village.

== Landmarks ==
- The Roman Catholic parish church was built in the second half of the 15th century onto foundations from the Romanesque period . Between 1759 and 1773, it was extended and the tower was heightened. In 1790, a hall and, finally, in 1900 as side chapel was added.
- In the cemetery located south of the village stands a cemetery chapel built in 1528, altered in 1822 and in 1866.
- On the Háromtetej hill which rises above a narrow valley of the Olt River, the ruines of the ancient castle of the Andrássy family can be seen,
- The village is unusually rich in mineral water springs. There are mineral water springs in the garden of not less than 21 homes. The mineral water is bottled in three plants. The best known is Perla Harghitei, or "The Pearl of Harghita".
- 'Borsáros' natural reserve. The gushing mineral water created a marshy area next to bridge of the Olt River.
- The local Ethnographic Museum

== Notable people ==
Natives of the village are:

- Vilmos Albert (1886–1971): teacher, writer
- András Kristó (1930–1994): geologist
- Ferenc Lestyán (1913–2008) ecclesiastical writer
- Mózes Lestyán (1720–1774): ecclesiastical writer
- József Mártonfi (1746–1815): Roman Catholic bishop of Transylvania, ecclesiastical writer.
- András Nagy (1905–1981): columnist
- Éva Ruszuly (1981 -): actress
- Jukundián Simon (1813–1894): Franciscan friar, composer
- Vilmos Tánczos (1959 - ): ethnographer
- Mózes Vitos, (1847–1902): pastor, local historian

== Twinnings ==
The village is twinned with

- Bárdudvarnok, Hungary
- Berekfürdő, Hungary
- Igal, Hungary
- Zalakomár, Hungary
- Krásnohorské Podhradie, Slovakia
