= Tiszavasvári District =

Coordinates: 48.0000°N 21.4167°E

Tiszavasvári District Tiszavasvári járás
- Districts of Hungary
- Coat of arms

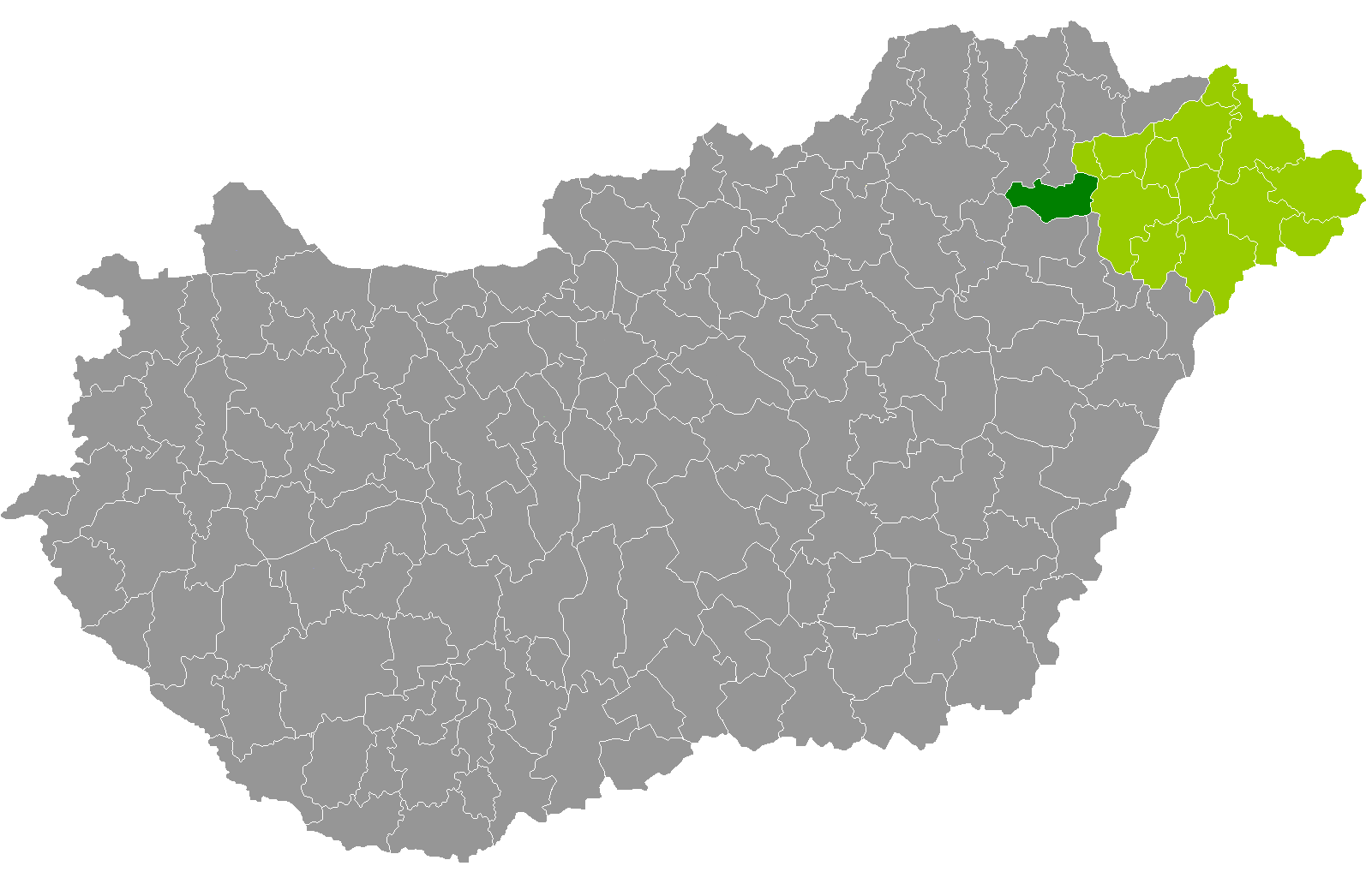
- Tiszavasvári District within Hungary and Szabolcs-Szatmár-Bereg County.
- Country: Hungary
- County: Szabolcs-Szatmár-Bereg
- District seat: Tiszavasvári

Area
  - Total: 381.61 km^{2} (147.34 sq mi)
  - Rank: 7th in Szabolcs-Szatmár-Bereg

Population (2011 census)
  - Total: 27,684
  - Rank: 8th in Szabolcs-Szatmár-Bereg
  - Density: 73/km^{2} (190/sq mi)

Tiszavasvári (Hungarian: Tiszavasvári járás) is a district in western part of Szabolcs-Szatmár-Bereg County. Tiszavasvári is also the name of the town where the district seat is found. The district is located in the Northern Great Plain Statistical Region.

== Geography ==
Tiszavasvári District borders with Szerencs District and Tokaj District (Borsod-Abaúj-Zemplén County) to the northwest and north, Nyíregyháza District to the north and east, Hajdúböszörmény District and Hajdúnánás District (Hajdú-Bihar County) to the south, Tiszaújváros District (Borsod-Abaúj-Zemplén County) to the west. The number of the inhabited places in Tiszavasvári District is 6.

== Municipalities ==
The district has 2 towns, 1 large village and 3 villages. (ordered by population, as of 1 January 2013)

- Szorgalmatos (1,039)
- Tiszadada (2,317)
- Tiszadob (2,929)
- Tiszaeszlár (2,572)
- **Tiszalök** (5,485)
- **Tiszavasvári** (12,964) – district seat

The bolded municipalities are cities, italics municipality is large village.

== Demographics ==
Religion in Tiszavasvári District (2011 census)
1. Calvinism (25.4%)
2. Lutheranism (0.30%)
3. Catholic Church (15.1%)
4. Greek Catholicism (6.10%)
5. Other religions (1.30%)
6. Non-religious (25.3%)
7. Atheists (0.70%)
8. Undeclared (25.8%)

In 2011, it had a population of 27,684 and the population density was 73/km^{2}.

Year	County population	Change
2011	27,684	n/a

=== Ethnicity ===
Besides the Hungarian majority, the main minorities are the Roma (approx. 4,000) and German (150).

Total population (2011 census): 27,684
Ethnic groups (2011 census): Identified themselves: 27,812 persons:

- Hungarians: 23,876 (85.85%)
- Gypsies: 3,561 (12.80%)
- Others and indefinable: 375 (1.35%)

Approx. 150 persons in Tiszavasvári District did declare more than one ethnic group at the 2011 census.

=== Religion ===
Religious adherence in the county according to 2011 census:

- Reformed – 7,040;
- Catholic – 5,877 (Roman Catholic – 4,181; Greek Catholic – 1,696);
- Evangelical – 70;
- other religions – 348;
- Non-religious – 7,011;
- Atheism – 198;
- Undeclared – 7,140.

== Gallery ==
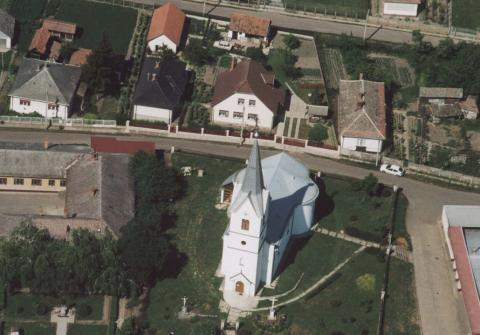
Tiszavasvári, the district seat

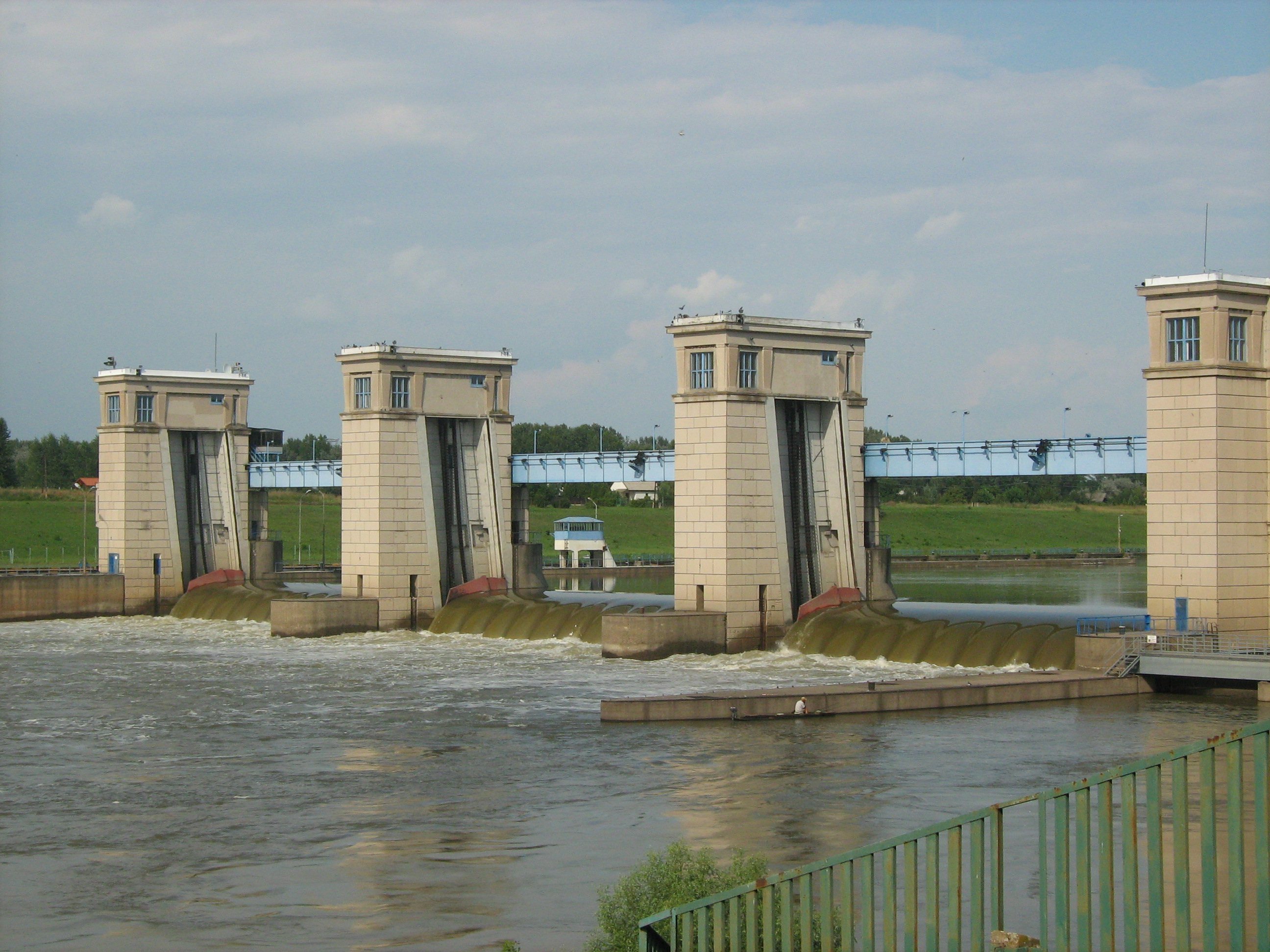
Hydroelectric power plant near Tiszalök

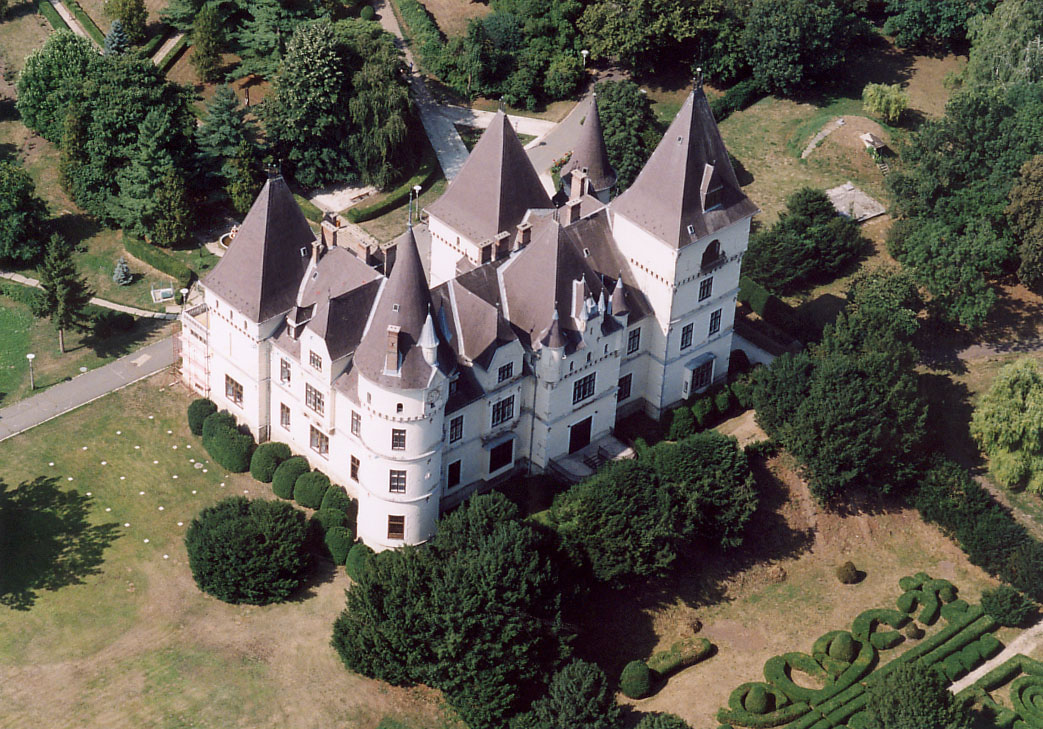
Andrássy Palace in Tiszadob

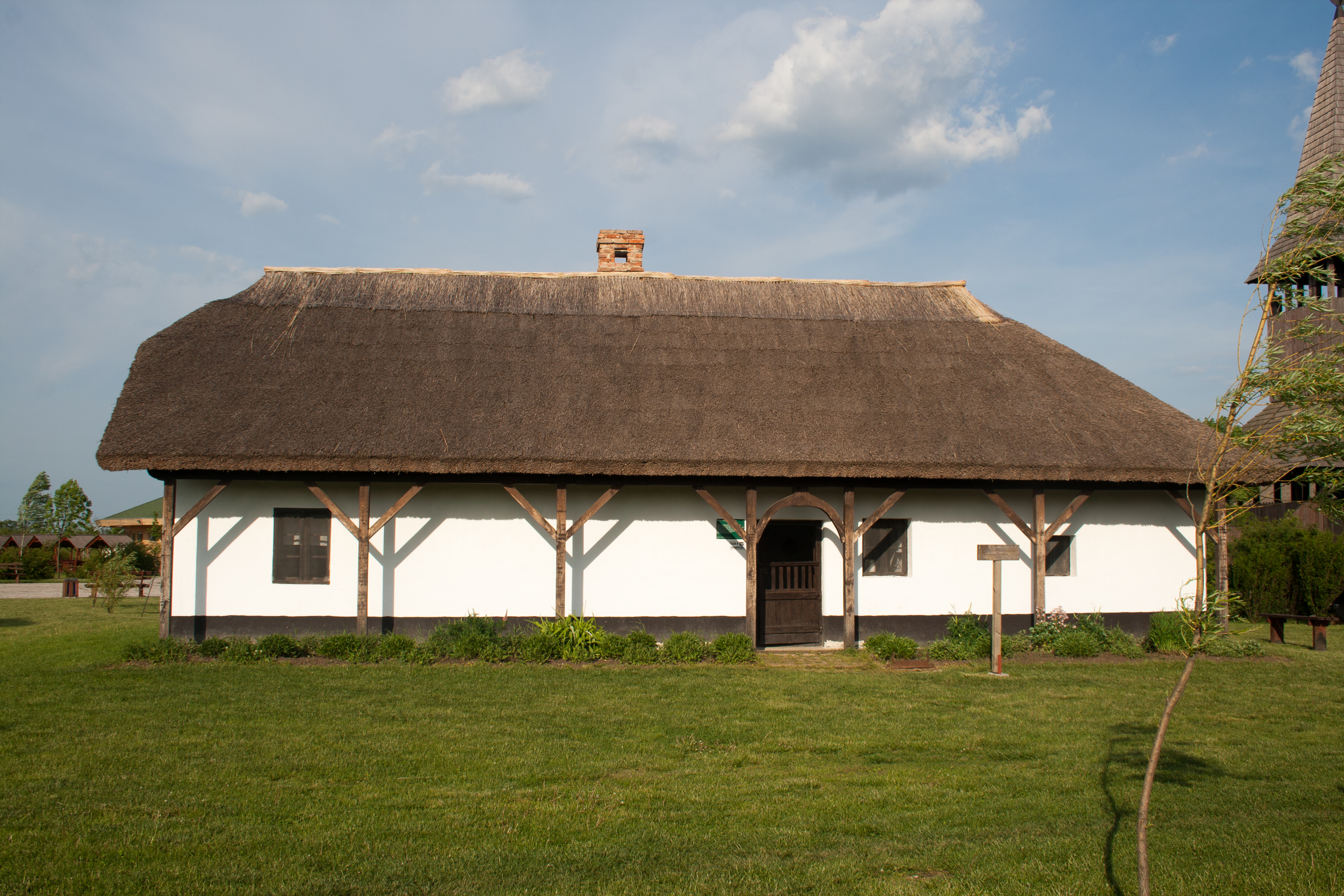
Traditional house from Tiszadob

== See also ==
- List of cities and towns of Hungary
