= István Andrássy (general) =

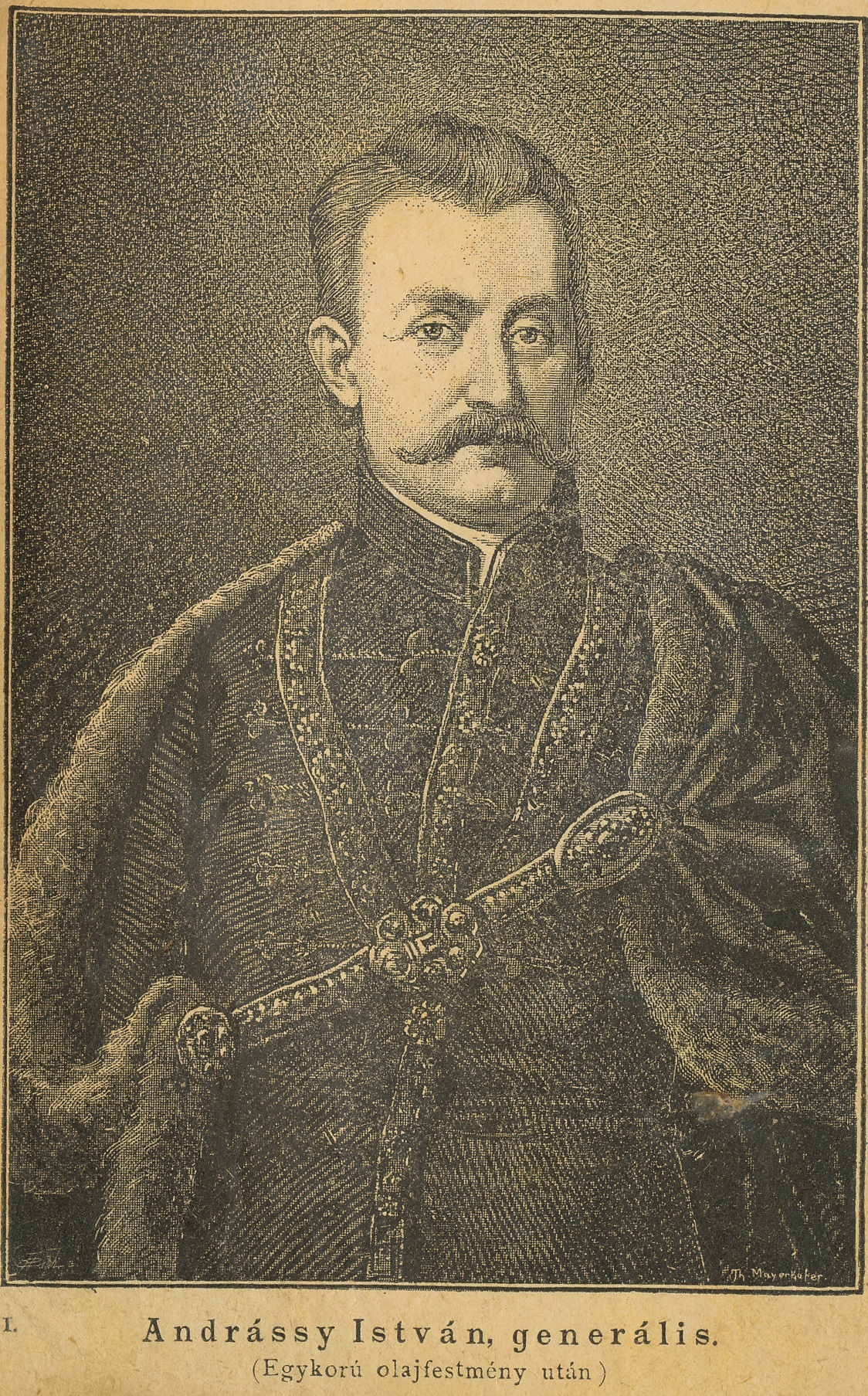
- Born: 1650
- Died: 1720 (aged 69–70)

Baron István Andrássy de Csíkszentkirály et Krasznahorka (1650–1720) was a Hungarian Kuruc general and nobleman, member of the old aristocratic Andrássy family. He was a supporter of Imre Thököly in the 1680s, and later joined Francis II Rákóczi in November 1703 during Rákóczi's War for Independence. He became commander of the Kuruc armies in the areas between Danube and Tisza (in Hungarian: Duna-Tisza köze).

Andrássy participated in the Battle of Győrvár on 6–7 June 1706. He became general of Lower Hungary in autumn 1707. He capitulated before Imperial General Löffelholz during the Siege of Lőcse (today: Levoča, Slovakia) on 13 February 1710. After that, he joined the Austrian Army "Labanc". He founded the family's betléri (de Betlér) branch and built a mansion in Betlér.

His younger brother was György Andrássy, also a Kuruc general, and founder of the monoki (de Monok) branch.
