= Tiszavasvári =

- Flag Coat of arms

- Location within Szabolcs-Szatmár-Bereg County Location within Hungary
- Coordinates: 47°58′N 21°21′E
- Country: Hungary
- Region: Northern Great Plain
- County: Szabolcs-Szatmár-Bereg
- District: Tiszavasvári

Area
  - Total: 126.59 km^{2} (48.88 sq mi)

Population (2005)
  - Total: 13,473
  - Density: 107.3/km^{2} (278/sq mi)
- Time zone: UTC+1 (CET)
  - Summer (DST): UTC+2 (CEST)
- Postal code: 4440
- Area code: 42

Tiszavasvári is a town in Szabolcs-Szatmár-Bereg county, in the Northern Great Plain region of eastern Hungary.

== History ==
Location of Szabolcs-Szatmar-Bereg county in Hungary

The settlement of Tiszavasvári was created in 1941 by merging the former independent settlements of Tiszabűd and Szentmihály under the name of Bűdszentmihály. The villagers of Tiszabűd opposed the merger and the two communities were separated in 1946 but only for four years. In 1950 the two settlements were again merged. The name of the locality was changed to Tiszavasvári in 1952 in memory of Pál Vasvári, a Hungarian writer and participant in the Hungarian Revolution of 1848.

== Geography ==
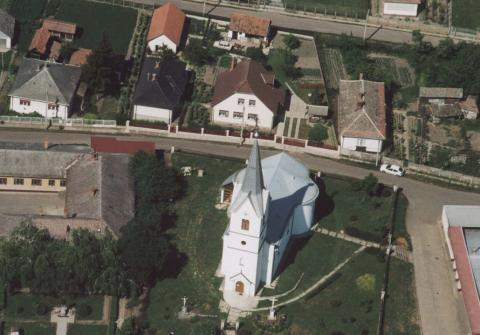
Aerial view of Tiszavasvári

It covers an area of 126.59 km^{2} (49 sq mi) and has a population of 13,473 people (2005).

== Twin towns – sister cities ==
Tiszavasvári is twinned with:

- Baia Sprie, Romania
- Izvoru Crișului, Romania
- Livada, Romania
- Șimleu Silvaniei, Romania
