= Oszkár Seszták =

Hungarian politician

Member of the National Assembly
- In office 14 May 2010 – 5 May 2014

Personal details
- Born: 1965 (age 60–61) Rakaca, Hungary
- Party: Fidesz; KDNP
- Profession: politician

Oszkár Seszták (born 1965) is a Hungarian politician, member of the National Assembly (MP) from Fidesz–KDNP Szabolcs-Szatmár-Bereg County Regional List between 2010 and 2014. He was elected President of the county's General Assembly on 3 April 2008.
