= Andrássy Castle =

Andrássy Castle (Tiszadob)
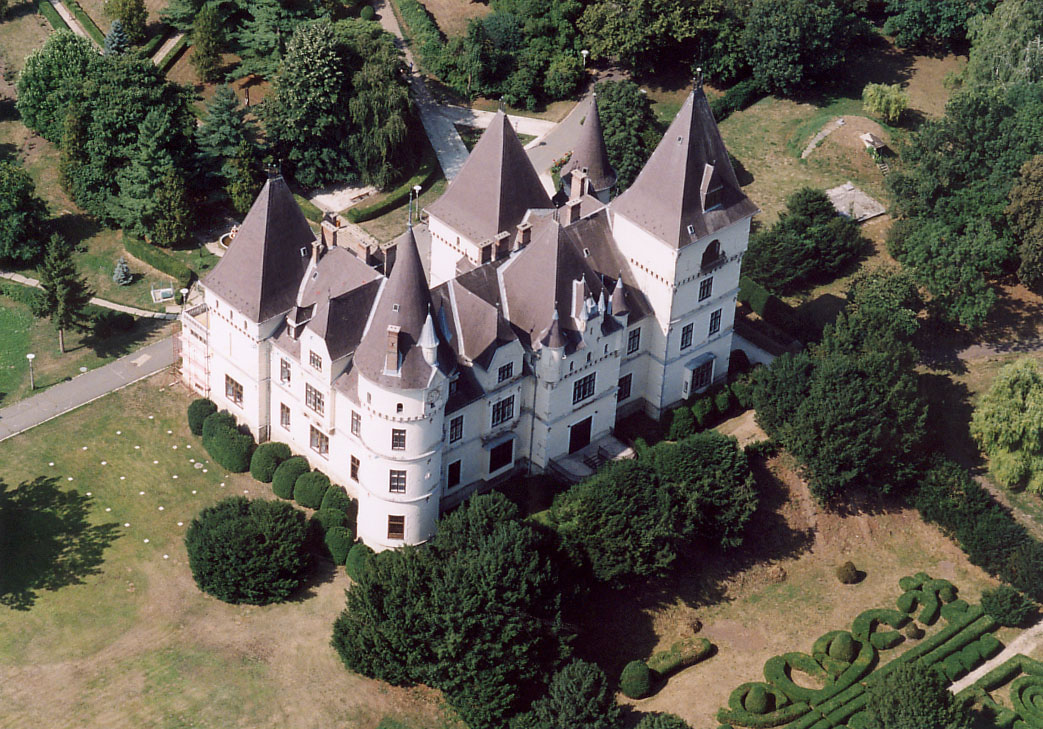
- Palace - Tiszadob - Hungary - Europe
- Interactive map of the Andrássy Castle (Tiszadob) area

General information
- Type: Castle
- Architectural style: Neo-gothic, Romantic
- Location: Tiszadob, Hungary
- Coordinates: 48.0172°N 21.1741°E
- Construction started: 1880
- Completed: 1885
- Renovated: 2011-2014

Design and construction
- Architect: Artúr Meining
- Main contractor: Count Gyula Andrássy

Website
- http://www.tiszadob.info/

Andrássy Castle is located in the north-eastern part of Hungary, in Tiszadob, Szabolcs-Szatmár-Bereg County. It was designed by Artúr Meinig, a.k.a. Arthur Meinig, for Count Gyula Andrássy, who was the second Foreign Minister of Austria-Hungary and first Hungarian prime minister.

== History ==
The castle and the surrounding park were built between 1880 and 1885. Meinig got his inspiration from various other European castles, one of the most obvious manifestations of which is seen in the ceiling of the large L-shaped salon on the ground floor, which is an exact copy of the ceiling stucco of the Cartoon Gallery of Knole Castle in Kent, England.

Count Gyula Andrássy died in 1890. The castle was then passed to his eldest son, Count Tivadar Andrássy de Csíkszentkirály et Krasznahorka (10 July 1857 – 13 May 1905).

The castle was raided by inhabitants of a nearby town, Polgár, in 1918 during the Aster Revolution. They destroyed not only the furniture, but all the paintings, Venetian mirrors, ceramics, and books.

The Andrássy era ended in 1945. Subsequently, the castle was used as a hospital for the Romanian army; many soldiers still lie at their final rest in the surrounding park. In 1948 the state confiscated the castle, and in 1950 it became an orphanage and functioned in this capacity until 2007.

== Renovation ==
A large renovation was carried out to the order of Szabolcs-Szatmár-Bereg county's local government between 2011 and 2014. The renovation was funded by both the Hungarian government and the European Union, and cost approximately EUR 7,1 million. The aim of the refurbishment was to enable Tiszadob and the Andrássy Castle to host a range of cultural attractions. It reopened its gate to visitors in 2015 and since it offers a variety of programs for the locals and tourists.
