= Doby =

Surname list

Doby is a surname. Notable people with the surname include:

- Larry Doby (1923–2003), American baseball player
- Winston C. Doby (1940–2011), American university administrator
- Kathryn Doby, Hungarian actress, dancer and choreographer
- Mathieu Doby (born 1982), Belgian slalom canoeist
- Monica Doby-Davis (born 1969), Grammy-nominated singer, Brownstone

== See also ==
- Dobie (name)
