= Andrássy =

Small arms of the Andrássy family

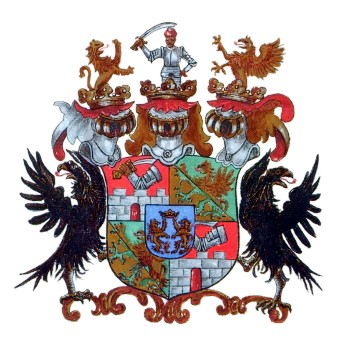
Arms of the Andrássy family

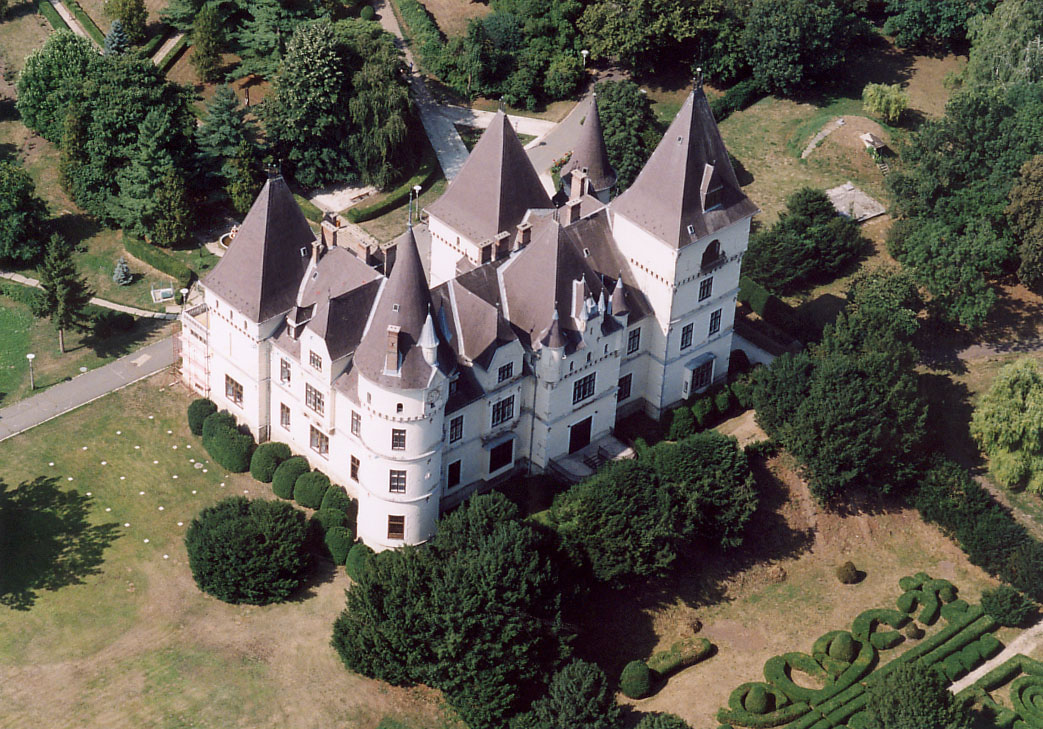
Andrássy palace in Tiszadob

The House of Andrássy is the name of a Hungarian noble family of that was prominent in Hungarian history. The full family name is Andrássy de Csíkszentkirály et Krasznahorka. Csíkszentkirály is a town in modern-day Romania, now called Sâncrăieni, while Krásna Hôrka is a castle in Slovakia.

== Recent history ==
The present head of the family is Count Gyula Andrássy de Csik-Szent-Király et Kraszna-Horka (b. 1927), who with his family currently resides in Canada. He married as his first wife the former Renate Hiller (b. 1928) in 1958, with no issue. He married secondly in 1964 the former Lesley Trist (b. 1934). By his second wife, he has one son, Michael (b. 1967), and one daughter, Ilona (b. 1965).

Count Gyula Andrássy is the son of the late Count Mihály Andrássy (1893–1990) and his late wife, née Countess Gabrielle Károlyi de Nagy-Károly (1899–1992). The paternal uncle of Count Gyula Andrássy was the late Count Imre Andrássy (1891–1985), who married firstly Edit Payer (without issue) and secondly in 1919 at Stockholm, Sweden, Stella Kuylenstierna (of Swedish nobility; 1902–1998). By his second wife, Count Imre Andrássy had one son, Imre Jr (1930–1984) married to Lois Mitchell from 1959 until her death in 1977, and two daughters, Maria "Vivi" (1921–2019), who married in 1941 Count Pál Cziraky (1919–2014), and Erzsébet "Bonzo" (1924–2017), who married, in 1950, Aladár Olgyay (1910–1963).

== Notable family members ==
- Miklós Andrássy (1686–?), Obergespan of Gemer
- Péter Andrássy (1659–1715), Obergespan of Gemer, son of Miklós Andrássy
- Baron István Andrássy, Hungarian general and brother of Péter Andrássy
- Baron József Andrássy
- Baron Károly Andrássy (1725–1792), became a Count in 1779
- Count József Andrássy (1762–1834)
- Count Károly Andrássy (1792–1845), Hungarian politician
- Count Gyula Andrássy (1823–1890), Hungarian statesman who served as Prime Minister of Hungary and then Foreign Minister of Austria-Hungary
- Count Gyula Andrássy the Younger (1860–1929), son of Gyula Andrássy
- Count Julius Andrássy (1961–2021), Grandson of Gyula Andrássy
- William Hespeler (1830–1921), German-Canadian businessman and politician, Great-Grandson of Károly Andrássy
- Adam Beck (1857–1925), Canadian politician, nephew of William Hespeler, Great-Great-Grandson of Károly Andrássy
- Ernő Andrássy (1894−1968), Hungarian ornithologist, physician, archaeologist, and polymath

== Places ==
- Andrássy Avenue in Budapest
- Andrássy Gyula German Language University of Budapest in Budapest
- Andrássy Castle
