= György Lázár =

Hungarian politician (1924–2014)

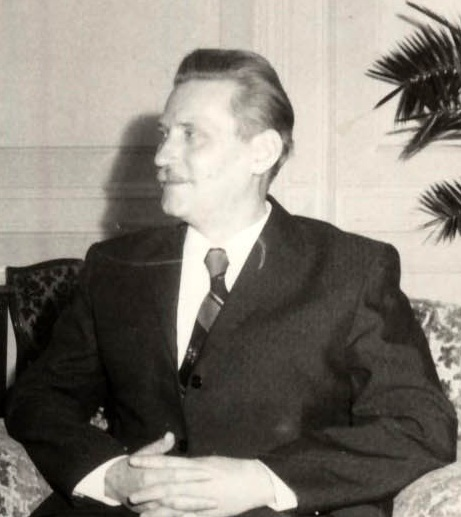

Chairman of the Council of Ministers of the People's Republic of Hungary
- In office 15 May 1975 – 25 June 1987
- Chairman of the Presidential Council: Pál Losonczi
- First Secretary: János Kádár
- Preceded by: Jenő Fock
- Succeeded by: Károly Grósz

Personal details
- Born: 15 September 1924 Isaszeg, Hungary
- Died: 2 October 2014 (aged 90) Budapest, Hungary
- Party: Hungarian Communist Party, Hungarian Working People's Party, Hungarian Socialist Workers' Party

György Lázár (Note: Hungarian pronunciation: [ˈɟørɟ ˈlaːzaːr]) (15 September 1924 – 2 October 2014) was a Hungarian Communist politician who served as Chairman of the Council of Ministers from 1975 to 1987. He retired from politics in 1988.

== Early life ==
He was born into a labour family in Isaszeg on 15 September 1924. His father was a carpenter. Lázár's original qualification was engineer. He worked as a technical draftsman from 1942 to 1944. During the Arrow Cross regime, he was forcibly conscripted into the paramilitary Levente organization in 1944. He was taken prisoner of war in January 1945. After that he joined the Hungarian combat units supported by the Red Army, which fought against the Nazi-backed Royal Hungarian Army in the western part of the country.

== Political career ==
He joined Hungarian Communist Party (MKP) in 1945 and was also a member of its successor parties: Hungarian Working People's Party (MDP) since 1948 and Hungarian Socialist Workers' Party (MSZMP) since 1956. From 1948 he worked for the National Planning Board (OT), he became a Deputy Head of Department and Head of Department after 1953. He served as Vice Chairman of OT between 1958 and 1970. He was appointed to a member of the Central Committee of the Hungarian Socialist Workers' Party in 1970 and served as Minister of Labour from 1970 to 1973. He became deputy prime minister and chairman of the National Planning Board in 1973 and also served as head of the State Planning Committee. Lázár functioned as Permanent Representative of Hungary to the Council for Mutual Economic Assistance between 1973 and 1975.

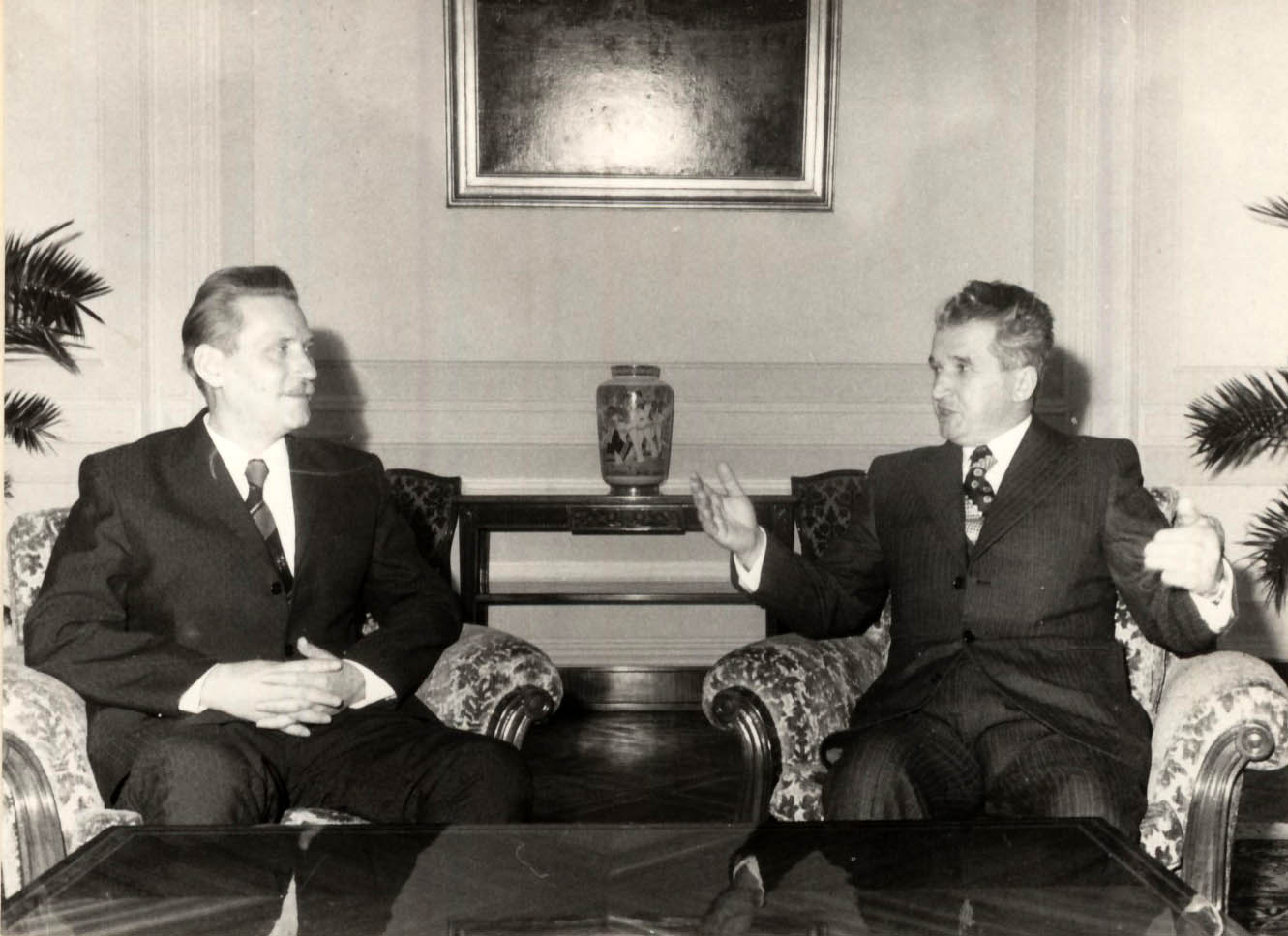
Lázár negotiates with Nicolae Ceauşescu on 21 December 1976

After 11th Congress of the Party in March 1975 he was elected to a member of the Political Committee. Following the downfall and resignation of Jenő Fock he was appointed Prime Minister of Hungary (officially Chairman of the Council of Ministers of the People's Republic of Hungary). He also became a member of the National Assembly of Hungary due elections in June. He is the third longest-serving Head of Government in history of Hungary after Viktor Orbán and Kálmán Tisza. His term lasting 12 years and 41 days from 15 May 1975 until 25 June 1987. He was called Secretary-General János Kádár's "most loyal sidekick".

György Lázár signed a treaty in Budapest on 16 September 1977, which initiated the controversial large barrage project of Gabčíkovo–Nagymaros Dams. During his premiership, along with his deputies Antal Apró and György Aczél, he was a member of that delegation which took over the returned Holy Crown from U.S. Secretary of State Cyrus Vance in the Hungarian Parliament Building. In the summer of 1987, when the highest party and state offices' major personnel changes were made (although most senior official only got another post, the same cadres stayed), Lázár was appointed deputy secretary-general of the Hungarian Socialist Workers' Party (i.e. deputy for Kádár). Károly Grósz succeeded him in the position of prime minister. The previous deputy secretary-general Károly Németh became chairman of the Hungarian Presidential Council following the retiring Pál Losonczi.

== Retirement and later life ==
In May 1988 at the party's national conference, when Kádár was replaced, Lázár was one of the few ancient leaders who were not elected to the new Central Committee. He lost all of his party functions. Lázár was retired in 1988. Since then, he lived away from the public view. In 2011 the issue of the former communist leaders and senior officials' high state pensions were highlighted. His name appeared on Heti Válasz's list, as well as the names of Béla Biszku or István Kovács.

He died on 2 October 2014 at the age of 90 in Budapest. He was buried without publicity, his family informed Népszabadság on Lázár's death on 30 October 2014.

== Sources ==
- Bölöny, József – Hubai, László: Magyarország kormányai 1848–2004 [Cabinets of Hungary 1848–2004], Akadémiai Kiadó, Budapest, 2004 (5th edition).
- Ezenanapon: Lázár György (Hungarian)
- Hungarian History, glossary, 1968–1990 (Hungarian)

Political offices
Preceded by József Veres	Minister of Labour; 1970–1973	Succeeded by László Karakas
Preceded by Jenő Fock	Prime Minister of Hungary; 1975–1987	Succeeded by Károly Grósz
