= Gyula Kállai =

Hungarian politician (1910–1996)

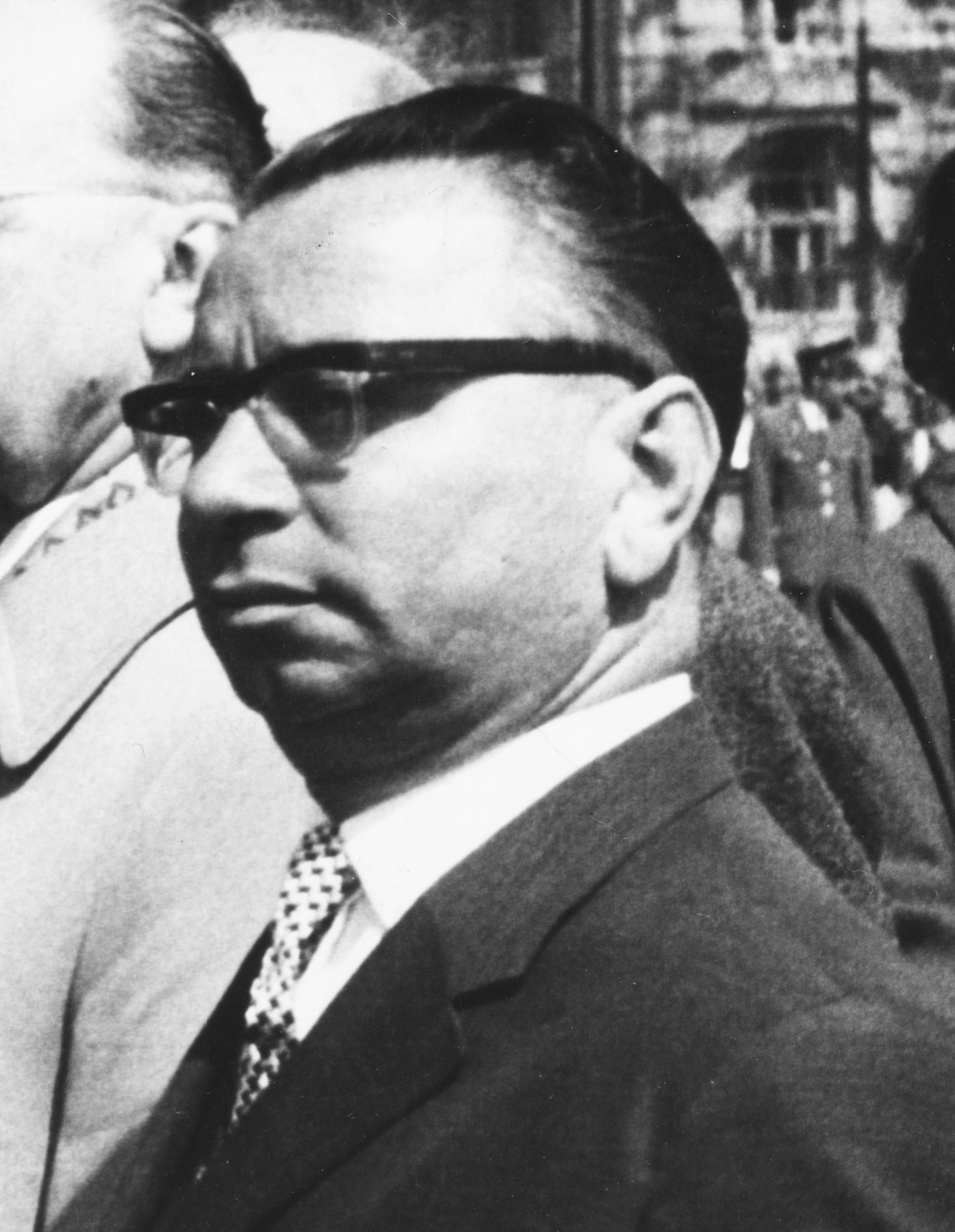
- Kállai in 1964

Speaker of the National Assembly
- In office 17 April 1967 – 12 May 1971
- Preceded by: Erzsébet Metzker Vass
- Succeeded by: Antal Apró

Chairman of the Council of Ministers
- In office 30 June 1965 – 14 April 1967
- Chairman of the Presidential Council: István Dobi
- Preceded by: János Kádár
- Succeeded by: Jenő Fock

Minister of Cultural Affairs
- In office 1 March 1957 – 28 January 1958
- Chairman of the Council of Ministers: János Kádár
- Preceded by: Albert Kónya
- Succeeded by: Valéria Benke

Minister of Foreign Affairs
- In office 11 June 1949 – 12 May 1951
- Chairman of the Council of Ministers: István Dobi
- Preceded by: László Rajk
- Succeeded by: Károly Kiss

Personal details
- Born: 1 June 1910 Berettyóújfalu, Bihar County, Austria-Hungary
- Died: 12 March 1996 (aged 85) Budapest, Hungary
- Party: Hungarian Communist Party; Hungarian Working People's Party; Hungarian Socialist Workers' Party
- Spouse(s): Anna Kárpáti (1st) ? Berkes(2nd)
- Children: Judit; Zsuzsa

Gyula Kállai (Note: Hungarian pronunciation: [ˈɟulɒ ˈkaːllɒi]) (1 June 1910 – 12 March 1996) was a Hungarian communist politician who served as Minister of Foreign Affairs from 1949 to 1951, Chairman of the Council of Ministers (Prime Minister) from 1965 to 1967 and Speaker of the National Assembly from 1967 to 1971. He was also President of the National Council of the Patriotic People's Front from 1957 to 1989.

== Biography ==
The son of a bookmaker, Kállai was born in Berettyóújfalu. In 1930, he enrolled as a student of Hungarian and Latin at the University of Budapest in 1930, transferring to the University of Debrecen in 1932. While a student, Kállai joined the Hungarian Communist Party (MKP) in 1931. Because of his political involvement, he was expelled from university in 1937 and started working as a journalist for the newspaper Független Újság in Debrecen and the social-democratic Budapest daily Népszava.

During World War II, Kállai was involved in the resistance against the pro-German regime of Miklós Horthy; he was arrested in July 1942 for participation in illegal demonstrations, but released in November of the same year due to lack of evidence. In September 1944, he participated in the refounding of the MKP, and served as representative of the party to the Hungarian National Independence Front.

In 1945, Kállai was elected a member of the Central Committee of the MKP and made a Secretary of State in the first post-war government. He headed the Office of the President of the Republic from 1948, until his appointment as Minister of Foreign Affairs in August 1949. Kállai held this office until April 1951, when he was arrested on trumped-up charges and sentenced to life imprisonment in a secretly-held trial. Released in July 1954, Kállai joined the Ministry of Public Education. He was reinstated as a member of the Central Committee of the Hungarian Working People's Party (MDP) in July 1956, and would remain a Central Committee member (after 1957 of the reorganized Hungarian Socialist Workers' Party, MSZMP) until 1989.

During the 1956 revolution, Kállai was a member of the Provisional Executive Committee headed by János Kádár. In 1957, he visited and questioned Imre Nagy, who was Prime Minister during the revolution, in exile in Snagov, Romania. His report led to Nagy's ultimate execution. From 1957, Kállai held a number of ministerial positions: as Minister of Cultural Affairs between March 1957 and January 1958, Minister of State between January 1958 and January 1960, and as Deputy Chairman of the Council of Ministers between January 1960 and April 1965. Between June 1965 and April 1967, he was Chairman of the Council of Ministers, and then a member of the Presidential Council until 1989 as well as Speaker of the National Assembly from April 1967 until May 1971.

Political offices
Preceded by László Rajk	Minister of Foreign Affairs; 1949–1951	Succeeded by Károly Kiss
Preceded by Albert Kónya	Minister of Education; 1957–1958	Succeeded by Valéria Benke
Preceded by János Kádár	Prime Minister of Hungary; 1965–1967	Succeeded by Jenő Fock
Preceded by Erzsébet Metzker Vass	Speaker of the National Assembly; 1967–1971	Succeeded by Antal Apró
