= Pál Ilku =

Hungarian politician (1912–1973)

Minister of Education of Hungary
- In office 13 September 1961 – 13 July 1973
- Preceded by: Valéria Benke
- Succeeded by: Miklós Nagy

Personal details
- Born: 8 October 1912 Bulcsu, Bereg County, Kingdom of Hungary
- Died: 13 July 1973 (aged 60) Budapest, People's Republic of Hungary
- Party: MKP, MDP, MSZMP
- Profession: politician

Pál Ilku (8 October 1912 – 13 July 1973) was a Hungarian soldier and politician, who served as Minister of Education from 1961 until his death. He had significant part in the organizing of the police strengths (pufajkások) which consolidated the János Kádár regime after the crushing of the Hungarian Revolution of 1956.

Political offices
Preceded by Valéria Benke	Minister of Education; 1961–1973	Succeeded by Miklós Nagy
