= Presidential Council of the Hungarian People's Republic =

Collective presidency of Hungary

Presidential Council
Agency overview
- Formed: 23 August 1949
- Dissolved: 23 October 1989
- Superseding agency: President of Hungary
- Jurisdiction: Hungarian People's Republic
- Headquarters: Budapest

The Presidential Council of the Hungarian People's Republic was the collective presidency of Hungary during the Communist era. It was created in 1949, following the enactment of a new, Soviet-style constitution that year. As the standing body of the National Assembly (the supreme state organ), it was originally vested with broad powers during the interim of parliamentary sessions. It exercised most of the Assembly's powers between sessions, but could not amend the Constitution. The Presidential Council could also issue edicts in lieu of law. On paper, these edicts had to be ratified by the Assembly at its next session to remain in effect. However, the principles of democratic centralism made such ratification a formality, meaning these edicts de facto had the force of law.

Its jurisdiction was limited throughout the moderate liberalization witnessed during the Kadar era. Along with the state itself, it was abolished on 23 October 1989.

The National Assembly, upon the recommendation of the Presidential Council, elected and relieved the chairman and ministers of the Council of Ministers of their duties.

== List of chairmen of the Presidential Council ==
Parties' MDP–MSZMP Independent

No.	Picture	Name (Birth–Death)	Took office	Left office	Political Party
1		Árpád Szakasits (1888–1965)	23 August 1949	26 April 1950	MDP
2		Sándor Rónai (1892–1965)	26 April 1950	14 August 1952	MDP
3		István Dobi (1898–1968)	14 August 1952	25 October 1956	MDP
(3)		István Dobi (1898–1968)	25 October 1956	14 April 1967	MSZMP
4		Pál Losonczi (1919–2005)	14 April 1967	25 June 1987	MSZMP
5		Károly Németh (1922–2008)	25 June 1987	29 June 1988	MSZMP
6		Brunó Ferenc Straub (1914–1996)	29 June 1988	23 October 1989	Independent

== List of vice-chairmen of the Presidential Council ==
Two vice presidents served simultaneously. They were deputy heads of state.

Name	Period
Károly Kiss	1949–1951
István Kovács	1951–1952
József Révai	1953–1958
Károly Kiss	1958–1961
György Marosán	1961–1963
Sándor Gáspár	1963–1988
István Sarlós	1988–1989

Name	Period
Dániel Nagy	1949–1963
Ödön Kisházi	1963–1975
Rezső Trautmann	1975–1989

== See also ==
- List of heads of state of Hungary during the Hungarian People's Republic (1949–1989)
- List of vice presidents of the Presidential Council of Hungary
