= Council of Ministers of the Hungarian People's Republic =

Cabinet of Hungary from 1949 to 1989

Council of Ministers
- Népköztársaság Minisztertanácsa
- Emblem of the Hungarian People's Republic from 1957 to 1990

Agency overview
- Formed: 20 August 1949
- Dissolved: 23 October 1989
- Superseding agency: Modern government
- Jurisdiction: Hungarian People's Republic
- Headquarters: Budapest

The Council of Ministers of the Hungarian People's Republic (Hungarian: A Magyar Népköztársaság Minisztertanácsa) was the supreme executive and administrative organ of the Hungarian People's Republic, the communist state that governed Hungary from 1949 to 1989.

The Council of Ministers consisted of the Chairman (Prime Minister), deputy chairmen, ministers of state, head of ministries and the Chairman of the National Planning Board. The Parliament of Hungary, upon the recommendation of the Presidential Council of the Hungarian People's Republic, elected and relieved the chairman and ministers of their duties.

== List of Chairmen ==
Name	Entered office	Left office	Duration
István Dobi	20 August 1949	14 August 1952	2 years, 360 days
Mátyás Rákosi	14 August 1952	4 July 1953	318 days
Imre Nagy	4 July 1953	18 April 1955	1 year, 288 days
András Hegedüs	18 April 1955	24 October 1956	1 year, 189 days
Imre Nagy	24 October 1956	4 November 1956	11 days
János Kádár	4 November 1956	28 January 1958	1 year, 85 days
Ferenc Münnich	28 January 1958	13 September 1961	3 years, 228 days
János Kádár	13 September 1961	30 June 1965	3 years, 290 days
Gyula Kállai	30 June 1965	14 April 1967	1 year, 288 days
Jenő Fock	14 April 1967	15 May 1975	8 years, 31 days
György Lázár	15 May 1975	25 June 1987	12 years, 41 days
Károly Grósz	25 June 1987	24 November 1988	1 year, 152 days
Miklós Németh	24 November 1988	23 October 1989	333 days

== See also ==
- Presidential Council of the Hungarian People's Republic
