= Jenő Fock =

Hungarian politician (1916–2001)

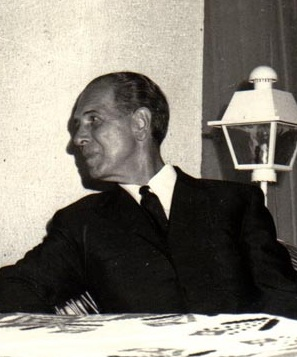
- Fock in 1972

Chairman of the Council of Ministers of the People's Republic of Hungary
- In office 14 April 1967 – 15 May 1975
- Chairman of the Presidency: Pál Losonczi
- Preceded by: Gyula Kállai
- Succeeded by: György Lázár

Personal details
- Born: 17 May 1916 Budapest, Pest-Pilis-Solt-Kiskun County, Kingdom of Hungary, Austria-Hungary
- Died: 22 May 2001 (aged 85) Budapest, Hungary
- Party: Hungarian Communist Party, Hungarian Working People's Party, Hungarian Socialist Workers' Party

Jenő Fock (Note: Hungarian pronunciation: [ˈjɛnøː ˈfokk]) (17 May 1916 – 22 May 2001) was a Hungarian communist politician who served as Chairman of the Council of Ministers of the People's Republic of Hungary from 1967 to 1975.

== Career ==
Fock joined the Communist Party of Hungary in 1932. During the Second World War, he was imprisoned for his Communist activities from 1940 to 1943.

After the founding of the People's Republic of Hungary on 20 August 1949, he participated in communist governance from 1952 to 1954 as Minister for Steel Industry. In 1957 he became secretary of the Central Committee of the Hungarian Socialist Workers' Party (MSZMP) and in 1961, he served as Deputy Prime Minister. From 1957 to 1980, he was also a member of the Politburo of the Central Committee.

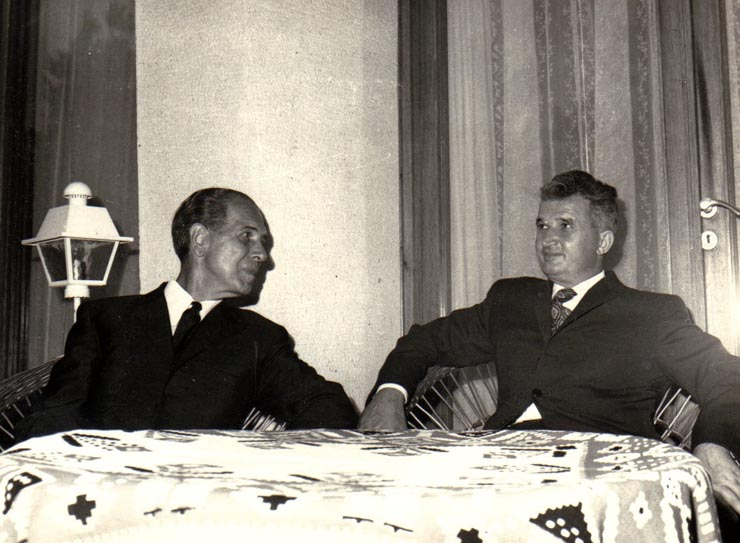
Fock negotiates with Nicolae Ceaușescu on 3 July 1972

On 14 April 1967, he became the successor of Gyula Kállai as prime minister. During his tenure, he unsuccessfully tried to introduce some market economy elements.

Formerly the Central Committee of the MSZMP announced János Kádár’s plans for the reform of the economy, known as the New Economic Mechanism (NEM). The reform is considered as "the most radical postwar change" of any Comecon country. The plan, which became official on 1 January 1968, was a major shift to decentralization in an attempt to overcome the inefficiencies of central planning. The NEM represented a move away from the Joseph Stalin economic system of compulsory plan indicators in favor of a policy that states profits as the enterprises main goal. The new economic policy was a "comprehensive reform of the economic system", creating market relationships among companies, using prices as allocative functions and companies responding to prices to maximize profits, and using profits to budget new investments.

These attempts failed, because of the resistance from the Comecom states and the Soviet Union. As a result, Fock finally withdrew in favor of György Lázár on 15 May 1975.

Between 1945–1947, 1958–1967 and 1971–1985 he was a deputy in the National Assembly of Hungary. Later he was president of the Association of Technical and Professional Societies (MTESZ).

== Death ==
Fock died in Budapest on 22 May 2001, five days after his 85th birthday.

== Publications ==
- A szocializmus építésének gazdaságpolitikája. Kossuth, Budapest, 1973.

== Sources ==
- Akadémiai kislexikon I. (A–K). ed. Mihály Beck, Vilmos Peschka. Budapest. Akadémiai Kiadó. 1989.

Political offices
Preceded by Gyula Kállai	Prime Minister of Hungary; 1967–1975	Succeeded by György Lázár
