= Valéria Benke =

Hungarian politician (1920–2009)

Minister of Education of Hungary
- In office 28 January 1958 – 13 September 1961
- Preceded by: Gyula Kállai
- Succeeded by: Pál Ilku

Personal details
- Born: 26 June 1920 Gyönk, Kingdom of Hungary
- Died: 7 June 2009 (aged 88) Budapest, Hungary
- Party: KMP, MKP, MDP, MSZMP
- Profession: politician

Valéria Benke (26 June 1920 – 7 June 2009) was a Hungarian politician, who served as Minister of Education between 1958 and 1961. She was also the head of Kossuth Rádió.

Political offices
Preceded by Gyula Kállai	Minister of Education; 1958–1961	Succeeded by Pál Ilku
