= Miklós Nagy =

Hungarian politician

Minister of Education of Hungary
- In office 13 July 1973 – 29 April 1974
- Preceded by: Pál Ilku
- Succeeded by: Károly Polinszky

Personal details
- Born: 8 June 1932 Kaba, Kingdom of Hungary
- Died: 29 April 1974 (aged 41) Budapest, People's Republic of Hungary
- Party: MDP, MSZMP
- Profession: engineer, politician

Miklós Nagy (8 June 1932 – 29 April 1974) was a Hungarian engineer and politician, who served as Minister of Education from 1973 until his death. He committed suicide because of his serious illness in 1974.

Political offices
Preceded by Pál Ilku	Minister of Education; 1973–1974	Succeeded by Károly Polinszky
