= Károly Grósz =

Leader of Hungary from 1988 to 1989

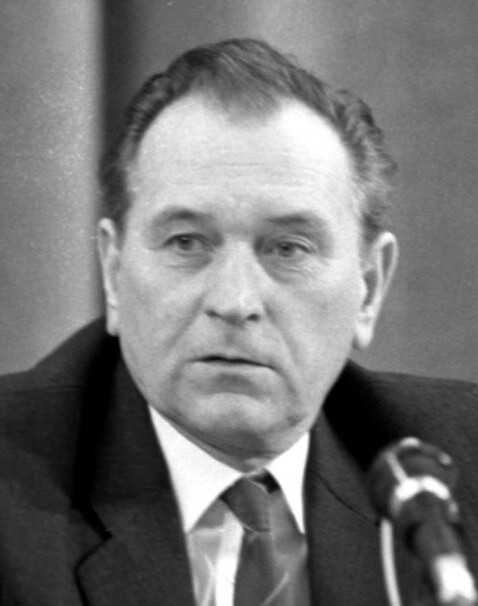
- Grósz in 1989

General Secretary of the Hungarian Socialist Workers' Party
- In office 22 May 1988 – 7 October 1989
- President: János Kádár; Rezső Nyers
- Preceded by: János Kádár
- Succeeded by: Office abolished

Chairman of the Council of Ministers of the People's Republic of Hungary
- In office 25 June 1987 – 24 November 1988
- Chairman of the Presidential Council: Károly Németh; Brunó Ferenc Straub
- Preceded by: György Lázár
- Succeeded by: Miklós Németh

Personal details
- Born: 1 August 1930 Miskolc, Hungary
- Died: 7 January 1996 (aged 65) Gödöllő, Hungary
- Party: Hungarian Communist Party (1945–1948); Hungarian Working People's Party (1948–1956); Hungarian Socialist Workers' Party (1956–1989); Workers' Party (1989–1990)

Károly Grósz (Note: Hungarian pronunciation: [ˈkaːroj ˈɡroːs]) (1 August 1930 – 7 January 1996) was a Hungarian communist politician, who served as the General Secretary of the Hungarian Socialist Workers' Party from 1988 to 1989.

== Early career ==
Grósz was born on 1 August 1930 in Miskolc, Hungary. He joined the Hungarian Communist Party in 1945 at the age of 14. The Communists took full power in 1949, and Grósz rose through the party ranks, becoming an important party leader in his native region. He functioned as head of the Department of Agitation and Propaganda in the Borsod-Abaúj-Zemplén County branch of the Hungarian Working People's Party (MDP) from 1954. He also held the position in Miskolc during the Hungarian Revolution of 1956, when he banned local journals from coverage of events and forced to remove Kossuth Coat of Arms from letterhead of local newspaper Észak-Magyarország.

Károly Grósz also displayed a behavior in '56 that never clearly indicated where he was committed. It could be concluded that he was perhaps on the side of the Földvári line, but then he changed his face at the right time and suddenly, with a behavior similar to Kádár, with a 180-degree turn, he stood on the exact opposite side.

Miklós Papp told this about Grósz, on 4 November 1956, after the revolution was crushed, Grósz was appointed head of the local party apparatus of the ruling communist party.

In 1974 he was appointed head of the Department of Agitation and Propaganda of the governing Hungarian Socialist Workers' Party. In 1979 Grósz was elected first secretary of the party committee of his home county. In 1984 he returned to national prominence as the head of the party committee in Budapest. At the next Party Congress in 1985, he became a member of the Politburo. In 1987, he was appointed Prime Minister of Hungary (Chairman of the Council of Ministers of the People's Republic of Hungary - the second most powerful position after that of General Secretary) to succeed György Lázár, who had filled the post for more than eleven years. The appointment of the younger and more energetic Grósz was acclaimed both at home and abroad.

As the country was facing economic troubles and growing discontent, the aging party leader János Kádár decided to resign, although originally he had planned to remain in office until 1990. In May 1988 a party conference was convened, which elected Grósz as general secretary of the party at Kádár's recommendation on 22 May 1988. He advocated moderate and measured changes in the political and economic spheres. As he put it, this would result in a careful reform of the Communist system without touching the latter's foundations. He liked to call this a "model change" (i.e. reforms and refinements within the Communist framework), as opposed to the total "system change", i.e. the replacement of Communism by a Western-style system, advocated by a growing faction of radical reformers in the party.

== Leader of Hungary ==
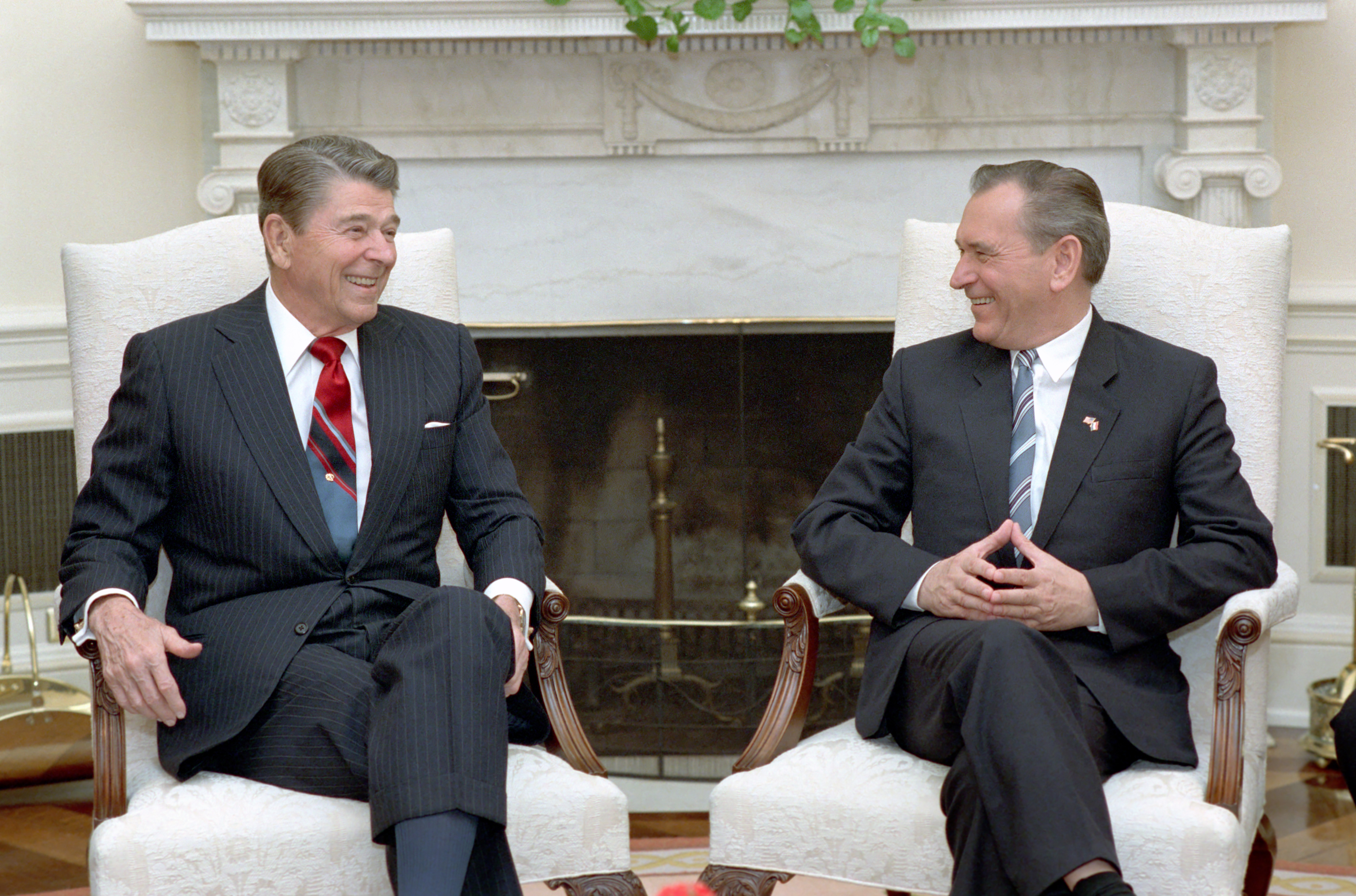
Grósz meets with U.S. President Ronald Reagan in Washington, D.C., 27 July 1988

Grósz remained prime minister until 24 November 1988, when he was succeeded by Miklós Németh, a representative of the radical reformer faction.

As 1989 wore on, Grósz was increasingly sidelined by the radical reformers within the party, including Németh, Rezső Nyers, Gyula Horn and Imre Pozsgay. He tried to slow down, stop or reverse the radical changes advocated by his adversaries that were aimed at establishing a liberal political system and market economy in Hungary. He opposed the rehabilitation of the executed Imre Nagy, Prime Minister during the 1956 revolution. In order to prevent Nagy's political rehabilitation, Grósz gave a speech before the Central Committee of the Hungarian Socialist Workers' Party on 1 September 1989, where he provided some information on the former prime minister's alleged NKVD ties, however the committee decided not to publish the charges.

Grósz's fate was sealed when he agreed to meet with Romanian leader Nicolae Ceaușescu to discuss what to do with a large number of ethnic Hungarians who had fled Romania. Many of Grósz' party colleagues thought he trusted Ceaușescu too much. He lost a good deal of authority as a result, and his standing never really recovered.

On 26 June 1989, following an extraordinary party congress, he became a member of a four-man collective presidency chaired by Nyers. Although Grósz retained his post as general secretary, Nyers now outranked him–and thus replaced him as the de facto leader of Hungary. However, he opposed the radical reformers' drive to reorganize the party as a social democratic party. He remained general secretary until 7 October, when the party reorganized itself as the Hungarian Socialist Party.

== Later life ==
The communist ("hardline") faction, led by Grósz, was defeated at the congress and broke away in December 1989 as a new Hungarian Socialist Workers' Party, with Grósz as its first acting chairman (later renamed Workers' Party and the 'Communist Workers' Party'). The party failed to win parliamentary representation in the first multiparty election in the newly formed Republic of Hungary. These elections took place on 25 March and 8 April 1990.

On 7 January 1996, he died of kidney cancer at age 65 in Gödöllő, Hungary.

== Notes ==
Political offices
Preceded by György Lázár	Prime Minister of Hungary; 1987–1988	Succeeded by Miklós Németh
Party political offices
Preceded by János Kádár	General Secretary of the Hungarian Socialist Workers' Party; 1988–1989	Succeeded by party dissolved
