= Károly Polinszky =

Hungarian chemical engineer and politician

Minister of Education of Hungary
- In office 29 April 1974 – 27 June 1980
- Preceded by: Miklós Nagy
- Succeeded by: Imre Pozsgay

Personal details
- Born: 19 March 1922 Budapest, Kingdom of Hungary
- Died: 15 August 1998 (aged 76) Budapest, Hungary
- Political party: MSZMP
- Profession: chemical engineer, politician

Károly Polinszky (19 March 1922 – 15 August 1998) was a Hungarian chemical engineer and politician, who served as Minister of Education between 1974 and 1980.

Political offices
Preceded by Miklós Nagy	Minister of Education; 1974–1980	Succeeded by Imre Pozsgay
