= János Kádár =

Leader of Hungary from 1956 to 1988

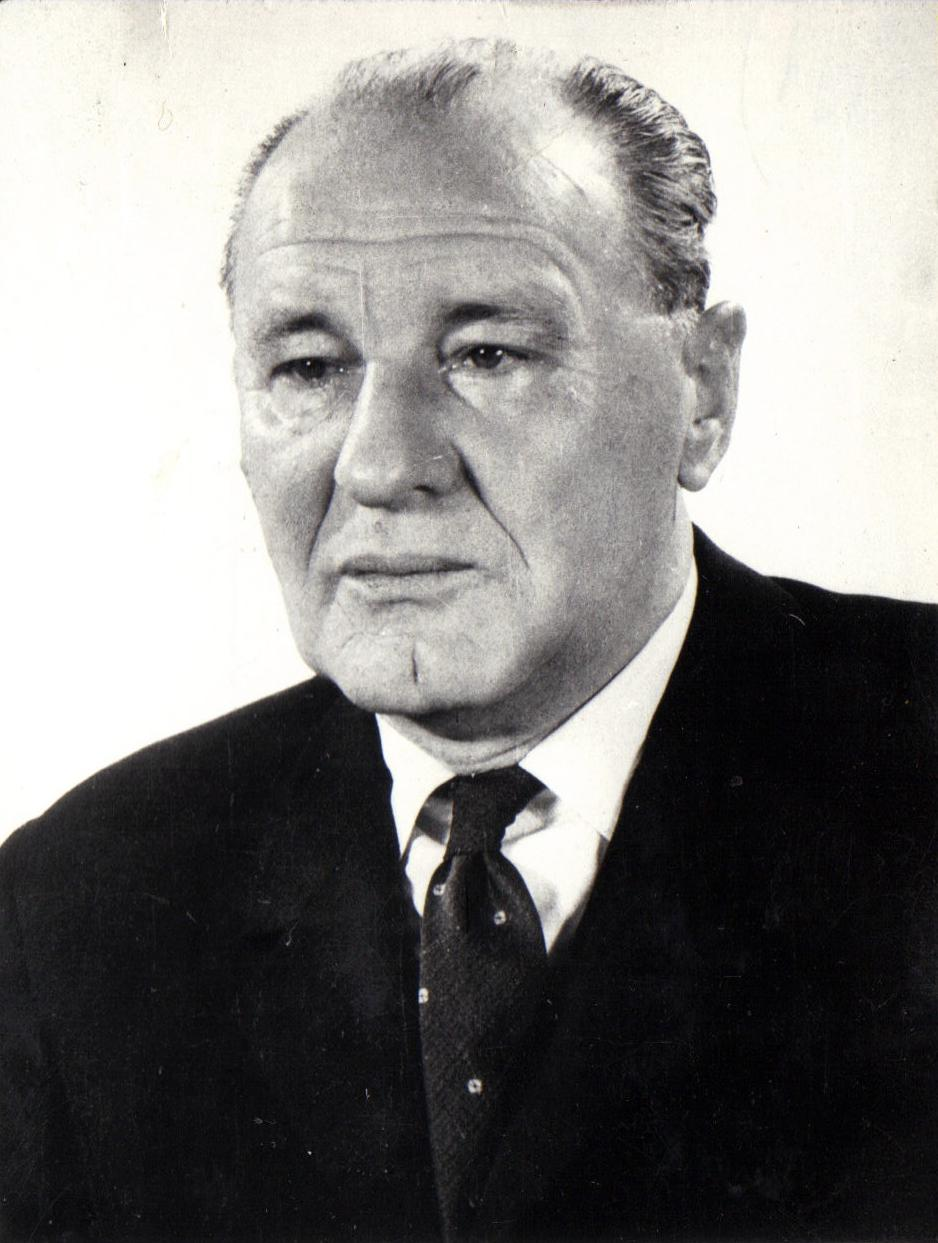
- Kádár in 1977

General Secretary (Note: Until 26 March 1985, the post was known as First Secretary) of the Hungarian Socialist Workers' Party (Note: Before 31 October 1956, the party's name was Hungarian Working People's Party)
- In office 25 October 1956 – 22 May 1988
- Preceded by: Ernő Gerő
- Succeeded by: Károly Grósz

Chairman of the Council of Ministers of the People's Republic of Hungary
- In office 13 September 1961 – 30 June 1965
- Chairman of the Presidential Council: István Dobi
- Preceded by: Ferenc Münnich
- Succeeded by: Gyula Kállai
- In office 4 November 1956 – 28 January 1958
- Chairman of the Presidential Council: István Dobi
- Preceded by: Imre Nagy
- Succeeded by: Ferenc Münnich

Minister of the Interior
- In office 5 August 1948 – 23 June 1950
- Prime Minister: Lajos Dinnyés István Dobi
- Preceded by: László Rajk
- Succeeded by: Sándor Zöld

Personal details
- Born: János József Csermanek; 26 May 1912 Fiume, Austria-Hungary
- Died: 6 July 1989 (aged 77) Budapest, Hungary
- Resting place: Fiume Road Graveyard
- Party: Hungarian Socialist Workers' Party (1956–1989)
- Other political affiliations: Hungarian Communist Party (1931–1948); Hungarian Working People's Party (1948–1956)
- Spouse: Mária Tamáska (1912–1992) (m. 1949)

János József Kádár (Note: /ˈkɑːdɑːr/; Hungarian: [ˈjaːnoʃ ˈkaːdaːr]) (né Csermanek; 26 May 1912 – 6 July 1989) was a Hungarian Communist leader and the General Secretary of the Hungarian Socialist Workers' Party, a position he held for 32 years. Declining health led to his retirement in 1988, and he died in 1989 after being hospitalized for pneumonia.

Kádár was born in Fiume in poverty to a single mother. After living in the countryside for some years, Kádár and his mother moved to Budapest. He joined the Party of Communists in Hungary's youth organization, KIMSZ, and went on to become a prominent figure in the pre-1939 Communist party, eventually becoming First Secretary. As a leader, he would dissolve the party and reorganize it as the Peace Party, but the new party failed to win much popular support.

After World War II, with Soviet support, the Communist party took power in Hungary. Kádár rose through the party ranks, serving as Interior Minister from 1948 to 1950. In 1951, he was imprisoned by the government of Mátyás Rákosi but was released in 1954 by reformist Prime Minister Imre Nagy. On 25 October 1956, during the Hungarian Revolution, Kádár replaced Ernő Gerő as General Secretary of the Party, taking part in Nagy's revolutionary government. A week later, he broke with Nagy over his decision to withdraw from the Warsaw Pact. After Soviet intervention in Hungary, Kádár was selected to lead the country. He ordered Nagy to be executed shortly after coming to power. He gradually moderated, releasing the majority of remaining prisoners of this period in an amnesty in 1963. His leadership was characterized by unrelenting Realpolitik; for a long time, he successfully maneuvered between Moscow's wishes, local interests and the expectations of the Western world. In an interview with a Western journalist, he called himself a "toiler for compromise".

Kádár was succeeded by Károly Grósz as General Secretary on 22 May 1988. (Grósz would only serve a year in this post due to the fall of Communism in Europe in 1989.) During his time as leader of Hungary, Kádár pushed for an improvement in standards of living. Kádár increased international trade with non-communist countries, in particular those of Western Europe. Kádár's policies differed from those of other Communist leaders, such as Nicolae Ceaușescu, Enver Hoxha, and Erich Honecker, all of whom favored more orthodox interpretations of Marxism–Leninism. Kádár's reformist policies and the increasing commercial ties to the Western World would in turn worsen relations with Leonid Brezhnev in the Soviet Union. As the leader of Hungary, Kádár attempted to liberalize the Hungarian economy with a greater focus on consumer goods, in what would become known as Goulash Communism. Kádár’s legacy remains contested; nevertheless, nostalgia for the Kádár era continues to be widespread in Hungary. A 2020 survey conducted by Policy Solutions found that 54% of respondents believe that life was better under Kádár than it is at present, whereas 31% disagreed with this assessment.

== Childhood ==
János Kádár was an illegitimate son of the soldier János Krezinger and the servant maid Borbála Csermanek. Krezinger came from a Bavarian German origin smallholder family of Pusztaszemes, Somogy County. The mother, Borbála Csermanek was born in Ógyalla (today Hurbanovo, Slovakia) to a landless Slovak father and Hungarian mother. The parents of Borbála were too poor to provide schooling for the girl, thus the teenage girl had to work as maid in various villas. Soon Borbála got a job in the popular seaside resort town Opatija. Krezinger met Borbála during his military service in Opatija, but the detailed story of how they met is unknown. Kádár only met his father once, in 1960, when Kádár was already the leader of the country.

Kádár was born out of wedlock in Fiume (now Rijeka, Croatia) on 26 May 1912. The infant was registered in the Italian version of his name: Giovanni Giuseppe Czermanik (In Hungarian: János József Csermanek) because he was born in the Italian-established Santo Spirito Hospital. Being an illegitimate child, the infant could only receive the Csermanek family name of his mother. Abandoned, Borbála gave birth to János in the middle of the holiday season, as no one wanted to employ a single mother with a child. Borbála went to look for Krezinger, but his family wanted nothing to do with them. She then walked ten kilometres to the city of Kapoly, where she persuaded the Bálint family to care for her child for a fee. Borbála found work in Budapest. To avoid the pronunciation problems of the Slovak-origin Czermanik name in Budapest, the family changed the orthography of their name to Csermanek.

Although Kádár's foster father, Imre Bálint, was in charge, it was Bálint's brother, Sándor Bálint, that Kádár would remember as his true foster father. While Imre served in the army during World War I, Sándor was left to take care of Kádár. Sándor was the only man Kádár had a good relationship with throughout his early childhood. Kádár started working at an early age and helped Sándor take care of his sick wife. Kádár years later recalled how his early experiences moved him towards Marxism–Leninism. He recalls how he was accused of setting a building on fire when the true culprit was the corrupt inspector's son. Suddenly in 1918, at the age of six, Borbála reclaimed him, moved him to Budapest and enrolled him in school. In school he got bullied for his bumpkin manners and his peasant talk.

Borbála worked hard to ensure that Kádár would get a good education. In the summer time, Kádár would find work in the countryside. He was seen as "alien" by his contemporaries, in the countryside they would call him a "city boy" while in the city they would call him a "country boy". Then, in 1920, Borbála got pregnant again; the father left soon. Kádár helped take care of his half-brother, Jenő. At the Cukor Street Elementary School, Kádár proved to be a bright student. He skipped school often, and his mother tried beatings to make it stop. Classes were easy for him and he skipped school to play sports. He did read often however, but his mother was unimpressed by this and sarcastically asked him if he was a "gentleman of leisure". Kádár left school at the age of fourteen in 1926. Kádár started his apprenticeship as a car mechanic. After he was turned down as a car mechanic, he started work as an apprentice of Sándor Izsák, chief Hungarian representative of Torpedo Typewriter Company in the autumn of 1927. Typewriter mechanics had a high standing among the working class, there were only 160 of them in the country.

"I was a servant to a village pig herder, a servant child to a kulak (rich peasant), a vici (janitor) child, a newspaper boy, a 'parcel delivery boy' or courier in the city, and even a briefly homeless evicted person. I worked from 5 in the morning until classes started at [elementary] school, then after the education in the afternoon I had to work again until late at night. Then came the 'beauty' of the life of a skilled apprentice. And finally, when I became a skilled worker – in 1929 – the great economic crisis and unemployment came for us. This is how the entire generation of young workers lived at that time."

— János Kádár about his childhood

== Party work ==
His first meeting with Marxist literature came in 1928 after he won a junior chess competition organised by the Barbers Trade Union. His prize was Friedrich Engels's Anti-Dühring. The tournament organiser explained to Kádár that if he didn't understand it after his first reading, he should re-read it again until he understood it. Kádár followed his advice, even if his friends were "unimpressed" by his reading. As he later noted later in his life, he did not understand the reading but it got him thinking: "Immutable laws and connections in the world which I had not suspected." While it may be true that as Kádár comments that the book had great influence over him, it was in 1929 when he was fired after he flared up at his employer after he talked condescendingly towards Kádár. When the Great Depression hit Hungary, Kádár was the first to be fired. What ensued was low paid jobs and poverty. He later became unemployed, and it was this experience which brought him into contact with the Communist Party of Hungary. According to Kádár he became a member of the party in 1931.

In September 1930, Kádár took part in an organised trade union strike. The strike was crushed by the authorities, and many of his fellow Communists were arrested. In the aftermath of the failed strike, he supported the party by gathering signatures for candidates of the Socialist Workers' Bloc, an attempt by the Communist Party to create a front which would win over new supporters. This attempt was thwarted by the authorities, and new arrests ensued. In June 1931, he joined the Communist youth organization, the Communist Young Workers' Association (KIMSZ). He joined the Sverdlov party cell, named after Soviet Yakov Sverdlov. His alias within the party became János Barna. During his early membership, the party was illegal, following the crushing of the 1919 Hungarian Soviet Republic. In December 1931, the authorities had been able to track him down, and Kádár was arrested on charges of spreading communism, and being a communist. He denied the charges, and because of lack of evidence, was released. He was however under constant police surveillance, and after some days, he was back in contact with KIMSZ. He was given new responsibilities, and by May 1933 he became a member of the KIMSZ Budapest committee. Because of his promotion in the Communist hierarchy, he was given a new alias, Róna. The party suggested, but Kádár rejected, the offer of studying at the Lenin Institute in Moscow, claiming that he could not leave his family alone. His advance up the hierarchy came to an end when he was arrested on 21 June 1933 with other Communist activists. Kádár cracked because of police brutality, when he later confronted his fellow arrested Communists, he realized he had made a mistake and denied and retracted all his confessions. He was sentenced to two years in prison. Because of his confessions to the police, he was suspended from KIMSZ.

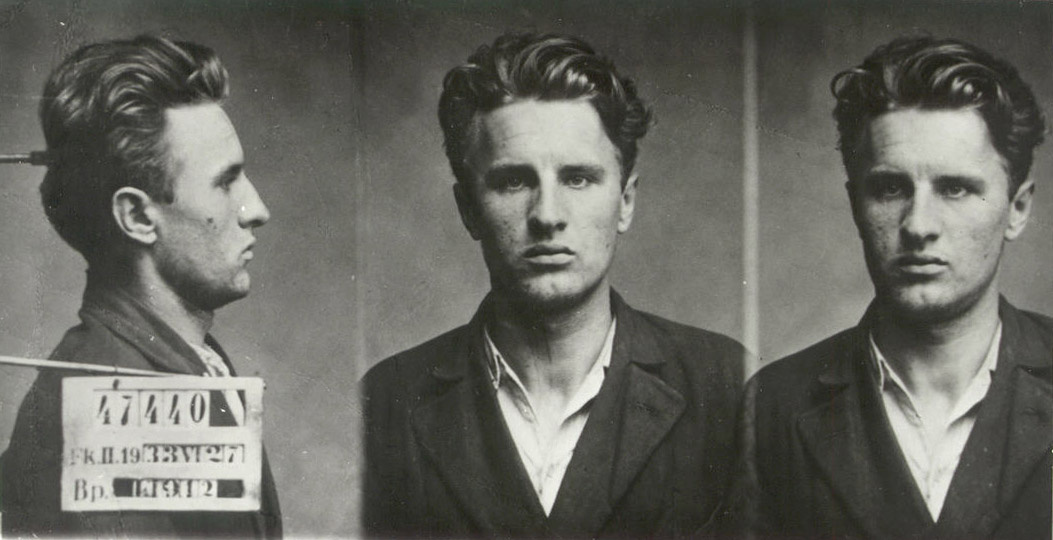
Kádár during his arrest in 1933

After being released for parole, he was politically in limbo. The hope of rejoining the Communist party was shattered by the Comintern's decision to dissolve the national Communist party in Hungary. The few remaining members of the party were told to infiltrate and work cooperatively with the Social Democratic Party of Hungary and trade unions. Kádár had in the meantime been able to persuade himself that it was because of changes within the party, and not his confessions, which had led to none of his associates making contact with him. He did, at the same time, have four more months of his prison sentence to serve before being released. In prison Kádár met with Mátyás Rákosi, a commissar of the Hungarian Soviet Republic and a renowned political prisoner. While Kádár later claimed that there grew a father-son like bond between them, the more plausible truth is that there grew a "somewhat adolescent cheekiness" between the two. In prison, Rákosi interrogated Kádár, and came to the conclusion that his confessions were due to his "shortcomings". After being released from prison for good, some former party activists made contact with him and instructed Kádár to infiltrate the Social Democratic Party with them. Within the party, Kádár and his associates made no secret of their Marxist views, frequently talking about the struggles of the working class and their gaze, which was directed towards the Soviet Union.

Kádár still lived in poverty, and found it hard to blend in with the upper working class and the intelligentsia. Paradoxically, his main Communist contact in the Social Democratic Party was a sculptor named György Goldmann. Kádár evolved into an effective speaker on "bread and butter issues", but failed at having any success on more serious and complex topics. In 1940 he was recalled to the party's ranks. At the beginning of its re-founding, the party liked to use members without any police records, therefore Kádár was given more responsibilities within the infiltration of the Social Democratic Party. During May and June the police arrested and rounded up several party activists, including Goldman, but Kádár had managed to go into hiding. As early as May 1942, Kádár became a member of the newly formed Central Committee of the Communist party, mostly due to the lack of personnel, seeing that the majority of them had been sent to prison. István Kovács, the acting party leader from December 1942, said; "he [Kádár] was extremely modest, a clever man but not then theoretically trained". Kovács brought Kádár into the party leadership and gave him a seat in the Secretariat of the Central Committee. By January 1943, had been able to get in touch with some seventy to eighty members, but this effort was torn apart by a new round of mass arrests, with Kovács being among them.

== First Secretaryship ==
The new leadership after the last mass arrest consisted of Kádár as First Secretary, Gábor Péter, István Szirmai and Pál Tonhauser. During Kádár's first tenure as leader of the party, he faced many problems, the most important being that the Communists were becoming increasingly irrelevant in a fast-changing situation, mostly because of the Hungarian government's continuing interference. In a meeting with Árpád Szakasits, a left-leaning Social Democrat, Kádár was asked to stop the party's illegal infiltration of his party. This meeting led to criticism being mounted against him during a Central Committee plenum meeting. In February 1936, Peter came up with an idea; his idea was to dissolve the party so that party members independently could spread communism, while a small secret leadership structure could keep itself together for some years. This, he said, would stop the continuing mass arrest of the Communist party personnel and in turn strengthen the party for the future. While at the beginning Kádár was against such an idea, the idea grew on him and came to the conclusion that instead of dissolving the party, he would pretend to dissolve it and rename the party which would effectively throw the Hungarian authorities off their trail. The so-called "new party" was formed in August under the name, Peace Party. This decision was not supported by all, and the Moscow-based Hungarian Communists led by Mátyás Rákosi condemned the decision and domestic militants. Kádár disagreed with the criticism laid against him, claiming it was a "tactical retreat" which led to the renaming of the party, but with no changes to either the party's principles or structures. His attempted plan to fool the police failed, and the police continued arresting Hungarian Communists. Later in his life, this would be one of the few topics of his life Kádár would refuse to discuss.

After the German invasion of Hungary, the Peace Party, with other parties, established the Hungarian Front, the party's potential allies were still very wary of them. Therefore, the Popular Front was never able to win much support amongst the populace. In the aftermath of the invasion, the party under Kádár's leadership started partisan operations and created their own Military Committee. Kádár tried to cross the border into Yugoslavia in hope of making contact with the Yugoslav partisans and their leader, Josip Broz Tito. At the same time, Kádár probably hoped to establish better, and stronger, relations with the USSR; something they had been trying to do since 1942. Kádár was given a new identity as an army corporal trying to cross the Hungarian-Yugoslav border. This attempt failed, and he was sentenced to two and a half years in prison. The authorities never figured out his real identity therefore members such as Rákosi thought he was a secret agent for the police. There is however no hard proof for these accusations, and incompetence remains the sole plausible reason. It was later proven, when SS officer Otto Winckelmann reported to Berlin that Kádár had been arrested, they had mistakenly confused Kádár for another Communist.

Kádár, while in prison, was able to send out messages to Péter, and other high-ranking party members, they were able to orchestrate a scheme to free him. In the meantime, the leader of Hungary Miklós Horthy was conspiring against the German occupiers. There were rumours that claim that Horthy tried to get in contact with Kádár, but did not know that he was in prison. Horthy was deposed by the German government and replaced by Arrow Cross Party leader Ferenc Szálasi. Szálasi's policies had an immediate effect on Kádár; he had emptied the prison Kádár lived in and sent them to Nazi concentration camps. Kádár was able to escape and made his way back to Budapest. Immediately after his return to Budapest, Kádár headed the Communist party's military committee. The committee tried to persuade workers to help the Soviet forces, but was not able to muster much support from the populace, therefore its effect was marginal at best. After the Soviet victory in Budapest, he changed his name from Csermanek to Kádár, literally meaning "cooper" or "barrel-maker".

== From leadership to show trials ==
=== Post–World War II career ===
After the Soviet conquest of Hungary, the Soviet–Hungarian Communist leadership sent Zoltán Vas and the new Kremlin-approved Central Committee of the Communist Party of Hungary; Kádár became a member. Kádár rose, not because of ideology, or technical knowledge, but rather for his organisational skills. He helped organize the Party's headquarters and designed its membership card. The Soviet troops stationed in Hungary committed mass rapes and pillaged Budapest and the countryside. Kádár told the Interior Minister, "The Soviet command caused really big difficulties in our work, especially in the beginning, and they still do". Kádár was appointed deputy chief of police. He had sharp critics, such as Rákosi's party deputy Ernő Gerő who felt his decision to dissolve the party during the war was a rash decision. Other peers felt he had been over-promoted. Nevertheless, he moved up to the Politburo of the Communist Party of Hungary. In February 1945, Rákosi was elected General Secretary of the Communist Party of Hungary.

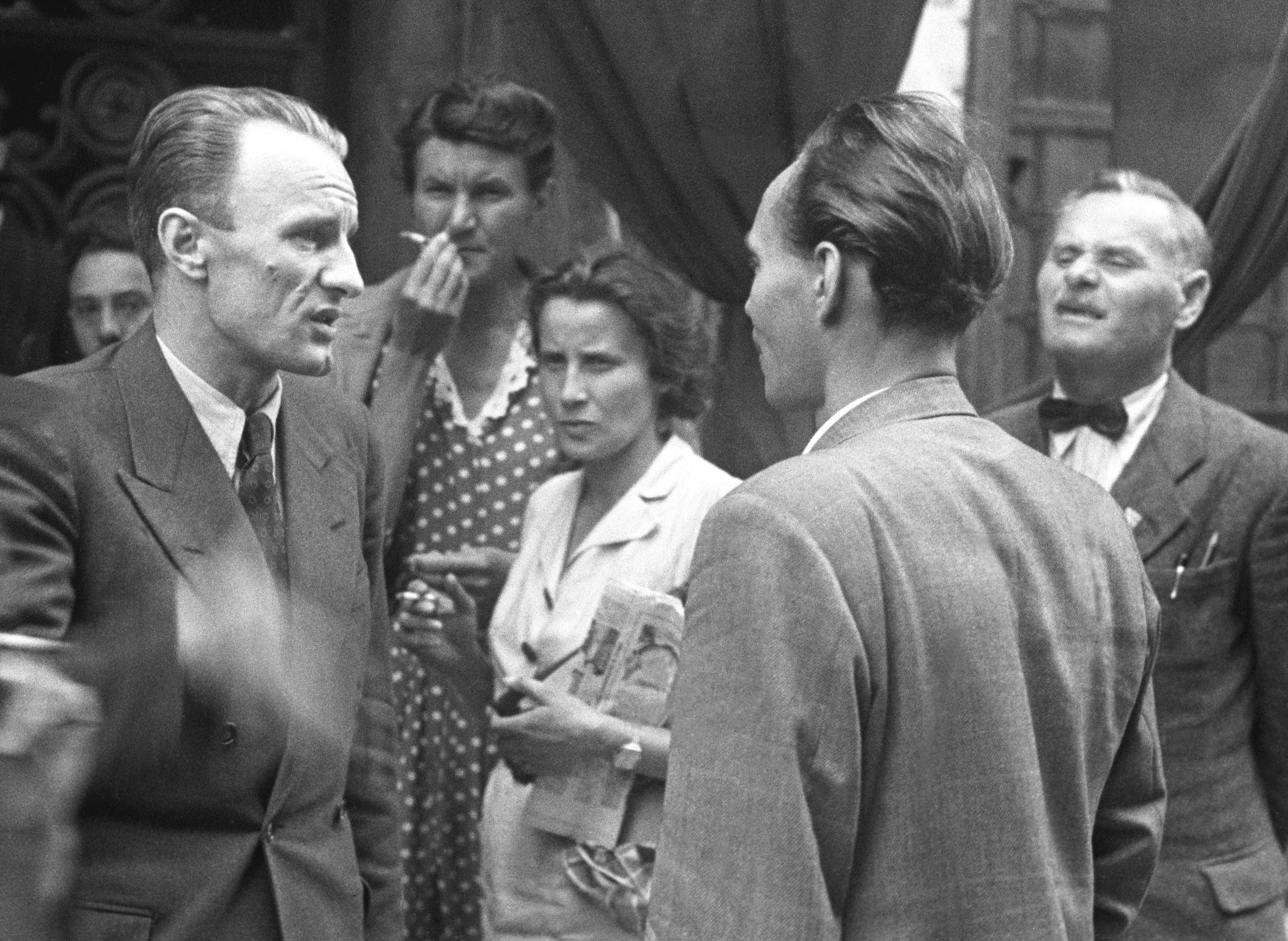
Kádár (left) and László Rajk, members of the Central Executive of the Hungarian Communist Party at the first national meeting of the MKP, May 1945

Rákosi's leadership consisted of Mihály Farkas the Minister of Defence. Kádár and Béla Kovács noted with puzzlement the leadership's total lack of interest in the domestic Communist's experience and outlook. As head of cadres, Kádár supervised membership appointments to the party. This position gave him contacts, some of whom would become very important to him in his later life. After failing to secure a majority in Parliament after the 1945 Hungarian parliamentary election, the Communist leadership started the divide and conquer strategy known as salami tactics. Kádár became a prominent figure during the period between 1945 and the 1947 Hungarian parliamentary election. Kádár had evolved a sense of rivalry with the Social Democratic Party of Hungary, claiming the party was "thrashing" them in government, and that they made it impossible for the Communists to negotiate policy with the Hungarian trade unions.

In 1946, Kádár campaigned for the Communist party in workers districts and factories. These areas were heavily contested between the Communists and the Social Democrats. The Communists were able to persuade the Social Democrats to hold elections in factories where the Communists held the majority. The clear majority results gained by the Communists during this election prompted the Social Democrats to postpone the rest of the election. At the 3rd Congress of the Communist Party of Hungary, Kádár was appointed one of Rákosi's two deputies. He was appointed deputy because of social and ethnic background, the majority of the leadership were of Jewish origins and were intellectuals, Kádár was however a "Hungarian" worker. In the aftermath of his appointment, he enrolled himself in Russian lessons and grew fond of reading, his favorite being The Good Soldier Švejk.

Kádár, as in 1946, was a Communist party campaigner, and was described by historian Robert Gough as "a great success". The Communists won a majority in Parliament in 1947 in a fraudulent way (by aid of the Soviet troops and Hungarian secret police, the ÁVO(later ÁVH)), and because of the escalation of the Cold War, the Soviet leadership ordered them to drop all pretense of liberal democracy and create an undisguised Communist one-party state. Kádár played an active role in the creation of the Hungarian Working People's Party; created when the Social Democratic Party was forced to merge with the Communists. At the unification congress Kádár made a speech which made little impact on the Communist movement in Hungary. In May 1948 Kádár visited the Soviet Union, and for the first and last time in his life he saw Joseph Stalin with his own eyes. During his visit to the USSR, Kádár's brother, Jenő died by an accident. On 5 August 1948 László Rajk was appointed to the office of the Minister of Foreign Affairs, and Kádár took his place as Minister of the Interior.

As Interior Minister, Kádár did not have real power as the most important organizations of internal state security, the ÁVH operated under the direct control of Rákosi and his closest associates. Unlike his Eastern European counterparts, Kádár was unenthusiastic about the role; Enver Hoxha, after being introduced to Kádár by Rákosi, thought "how he didn’t seem to me to be of the right stuff to be minister of internal affairs". In 1949, his mother, Borbála died, and Kádár married Mária Tamáska. Just as Stalin had launched a Great Purge against those with knowledge of the pre-Stalin party, Rákosi launched a purge against those who had worked in Hungary, and not in the Soviet Union, during World War II and before or endangered his power. In retrospect, it is clear that Kádár was appointed Minister of the Interior with the deliberate aim to involve him in the "show trial" of Laszlo Rajk, although the investigations and proceedings were handled by the State Security Agency ÁVH with the active participation of the experts of the Soviet Secret Police. Rákosi later boasted of "spending many a sleepless night" in unraveling the threads of the "anti-party conspiracy" led by "Rajk and his gang". During the public trial, Rákosi personally gave instructions to the judge over the phone. Rákosi would later attempt to blame Kádár for Rajk's death.

Later in his life, Rákosi said that Rajk died screaming "Long live Stalin! Long live Rákosi!" Instead, Tibor Szönyi died without saying a word and with András Szalai crying. Farkas and Gábor Péter, upon the death of Rajk and the others, said "provocateurs to their last breaths". This event didn't assure Kádár; making him doubt if any of the accusation leveled against his coworkers were true. It is believed that after Rajk's execution by hanging Kádár was seen vomiting; these rumours have not been confirmed by any sources from that time. Rákosi contacted him the following the day, asking him why he was in such a bad mood, and continued, saying; "Did the executions affect you that much?". According to certain rumours, which are probably not reliable, Kádár visited Rákosi to tell him about his reaction to the execution. Later, during a party presentation to a college, Kádár emphasized party austerity. This presentation might reflect on Kádár's reaction to Rajk's execution and his revelation that he might become the next victim of government repression. When holding his presentation, he was described by his audience as a "haggard", "distressed" and as a man under a lot of "strain".

=== Show trial and rehabilitation ===
Rákosi told Kádár, in late August 1950, that former Social Democratic party leader Árpád Szakasits had confessed to being a spy for the capitalistic countries. Szakasits' imprisonment would be the start of a long purge against former social democrats, trade union officials, and high-standing Communist party members. The purge would last until 1953, the extent of the purge went so far that the ÁVH held files on around one million, literally one-tenth of Hungary's population at that time. The purges were enacted when Rákosi and his associates were in the middle of the country's collectivising agriculture and the rapid industrialisation efforts. Ernő Gerő's ambition to make Hungary a land made out of "steel and iron" led to a decline in the national standards of living.

At this point, Rákosi had started distrusting Kádár, leading Kádár to resign as Ministry of the Interior citing health and stress reasons for his choice. Kádár believed the longer down the ladder he climbed there was a bigger chance of not being purged. In this he was wrong, and he along with new Minister of the Interior Sándor Zöld, were criticised for not doing a proper enough job to remove the anti-socialist movement within the country. Kádár would later refute most of the allegations the Rákosi leadership put against, but to no avail, and for every letter he wrote to refute an allegation another allegation was put against him. He eventually gave up and in one letter Kádár even admitted to his faults; claiming that he was still "politically backward" and "ideologically untrained" when he headed the prewar Communist Party as First Secretary. Kádár concluded that he had been fooled by the capitalists and therefore offered his resignation from active politics. Instead of resigning, and losing his seats in the Central Committee and the Politburo, his memberships in these organisations were renewed at the party congress. Believing that his position was secure and that Rákosi had given him another chance, Kádár thought nothing more of it. This proved to be wrong, and by the end of March 1951, Rákosi informed the Soviets that Kádár along with Zöld and Gyula Kállai were to be imprisoned.

On 18 April 1951, Zöld had killed his whole family and committed suicide after finding out that Rákosi and his associates had decided to purge him from the party. When the authorities found their bodies, they decided to quickly gather the remaining two before they did something rash too. Kádár, who did not know what had just taken place, was at home taking care of his wife Maria, who had been in and out of the hospital. The Hungarian leadership decided to call him, asking Kádár to meet them at the party headquarters, when leaving his home he was stopped by ÁVH officers and the ÁVH head Gábor Péter.

Only a year later, Kádár found himself the defendant in a show trial of his own—on false charges of having been a spy of Horthy's police. This time it was Kádár who was beaten by the security police and urged to "confess". During Kádár's interrogation, the ÁVH reportedly beat him, smeared him with mercury to prevent his skin pores from breathing, and had his questioner urinate into his pried-open mouth. However, at the 1954 rehearing of his trial, when asked if he had been maltreated, he answered "Physically no", a denial he repeated in later interviews towards the end of his life. It is thought by some that the stories of brutality were intended to portray him as a victim of Stalinist torture in order to counter his image at home and abroad as a Soviet stooge.

Kádár was found guilty and sentenced to life imprisonment. His incarceration included three years of solitary confinement, conditions far worse than he suffered while imprisoned under the Horthy regime. He was released from prison in July 1954, after the death of Stalin and the appointment of Imre Nagy as Prime Minister in 1953. Kádár accepted the offer to act as party secretary in the heavily industrialized 13th district of Budapest. He rose to prominence quickly, building up a large following among workers who demanded increased freedom for trade unions.

== Role in the Hungarian Revolution of 1956 ==
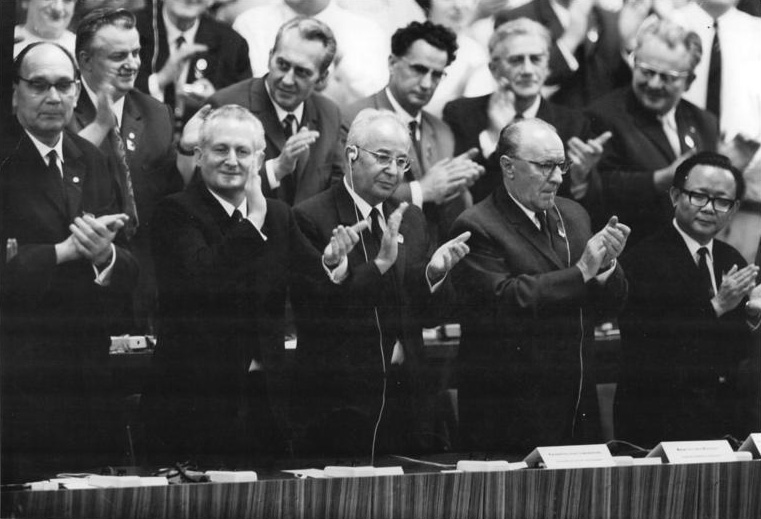
Kádár (fourth in the first row) at the 8th Congress of the Socialist Unity Party of Germany (East Berlin, 1971)

Mátyás Rákosi was forced to resign on July in 1956, replaced by Gerő. On 23 October 1956, students marched through Budapest intending to present a petition to the government. The procession swelled as several people poured onto the streets. Gerő replied with a harsh speech that angered the people, and police opened fire. It proved to be the start of the Hungarian Revolution of 1956. As the revolution spread throughout the country, Imre Nagy was called back as Prime Minister.

The Hungarian Working People's Party decided to dissolve itself and to reorganize itself as the Hungarian Socialist Workers' Party. On 25 October 1956, Kádár was elected General Secretary. He was also a member of the Nagy Government as Minister of State.

Nagy began a process of liberalization, removing state controls over the press, releasing many political prisoners, and expressing wishes to withdraw Hungary from the Warsaw Pact. He formed a coalition government. Although the Soviet leaders issued a statement that they strove to establish a new relationship with Hungary on the basis of mutual respect and equality, in the first days of November, the Presidium of the Soviet Communist Party took a decision to crush the revolution by force.

On 1 November 1956, Kádár, together with Ferenc Münnich, left Hungary for Moscow with the support of the Soviet Embassy in Budapest. There the Soviet leaders tried to convince him that a "counter-revolution" was unfolding in Hungary that must be put to an end at any cost. He only agreed to change sides when the Soviet leaders informed him that the decision had already been taken to crush the revolution with the help of the Soviet troops stationed in Hungary. He was also told that unless he agreed to become prime minister in the new government, the Rákosi–Gerő leadership would be reinstalled. Although he was under duress, he did not, by his own admission, resist as much as he could have. In a speech given on 12 April 1989, he confessed to having played a role in Nagy's execution, calling it his "own personal tragedy". Writing in 1961, American journalist John Gunther said that "Kádár today looks like a man pursued by shadows, a walking corpse".

At dawn on 4 November 1956, Soviet tank divisions moved into Budapest with orders to crush the revolution. The proclamation of the so-called Revolutionary Workers'-Peasants' Government of Hungary, headed by Kádár, was broadcast from Szolnok the same day. He announced a "Fifteen Point Programme" for this new government:

1. To secure Hungary's national independence and sovereignty
2. To protect the people's democratic and socialist system from all attacks
3. To end fratricidal fighting and to restore order
4. To establish close fraternal relations with other socialist countries on the basis of complete equality and non-interference
5. To cooperate peacefully with all nations irrespective of form of government
6. To quickly and substantially raise the standard of living for all in Hungary
7. Modification of the Five Year Plan, to allow for this increase in the standard of living
8. Elimination of bureaucracy and the broadening of democracy, in the workers' interest
9. On the basis of the broadened democracy, management by the workers must be implemented in factories and enterprises
10. To develop agricultural production, abolish compulsory deliveries and grant assistance to individual farmers
11. To guarantee democratic elections in the already existing administrative bodies and Revolutionary Councils
12. Support for artisans and retail trade
13. Development of Hungarian culture in the spirit of Hungary's progressive traditions
14. The Hungarian Revolutionary Worker-Peasant Government, acting in the interest of our people, requested the Red Army to help our nation smash the sinister forces of reaction and restore order and calm in Hungary
15. To negotiate with the forces of the Warsaw Pact on the withdrawal of troops from Hungary following the end of the crisis

The 15th point was withdrawn after pressure from the USSR that a 200,000 strong Soviet detachment be garrisoned in Hungary. This development allowed Kádár to divert huge defense funds to welfare. Nagy, along with Georg Lukács, Géza Losonczy and László Rajk's widow, Júlia, fled to the Yugoslav Embassy. Kádár promised them safe return home at their request but failed to keep this promise as the Soviet party leaders decided that Imre Nagy and the other members of the government who had sought asylum at the Yugoslav Embassy should be deported to Romania. Later on, a trial was instituted to establish the responsibility of the Imre Nagy Government in the 1956 events. Although it was adjourned several times, the defendants were eventually convicted of treason and conspiracy to overthrow the "democratic state order". Imre Nagy, Pál Maléter and Miklós Gimes were sentenced to death and executed on 16 June 1958. Géza Losonczy and Attila Szigethy both died in prison under suspicious circumstances during the court proceedings.

== Kádár era ==
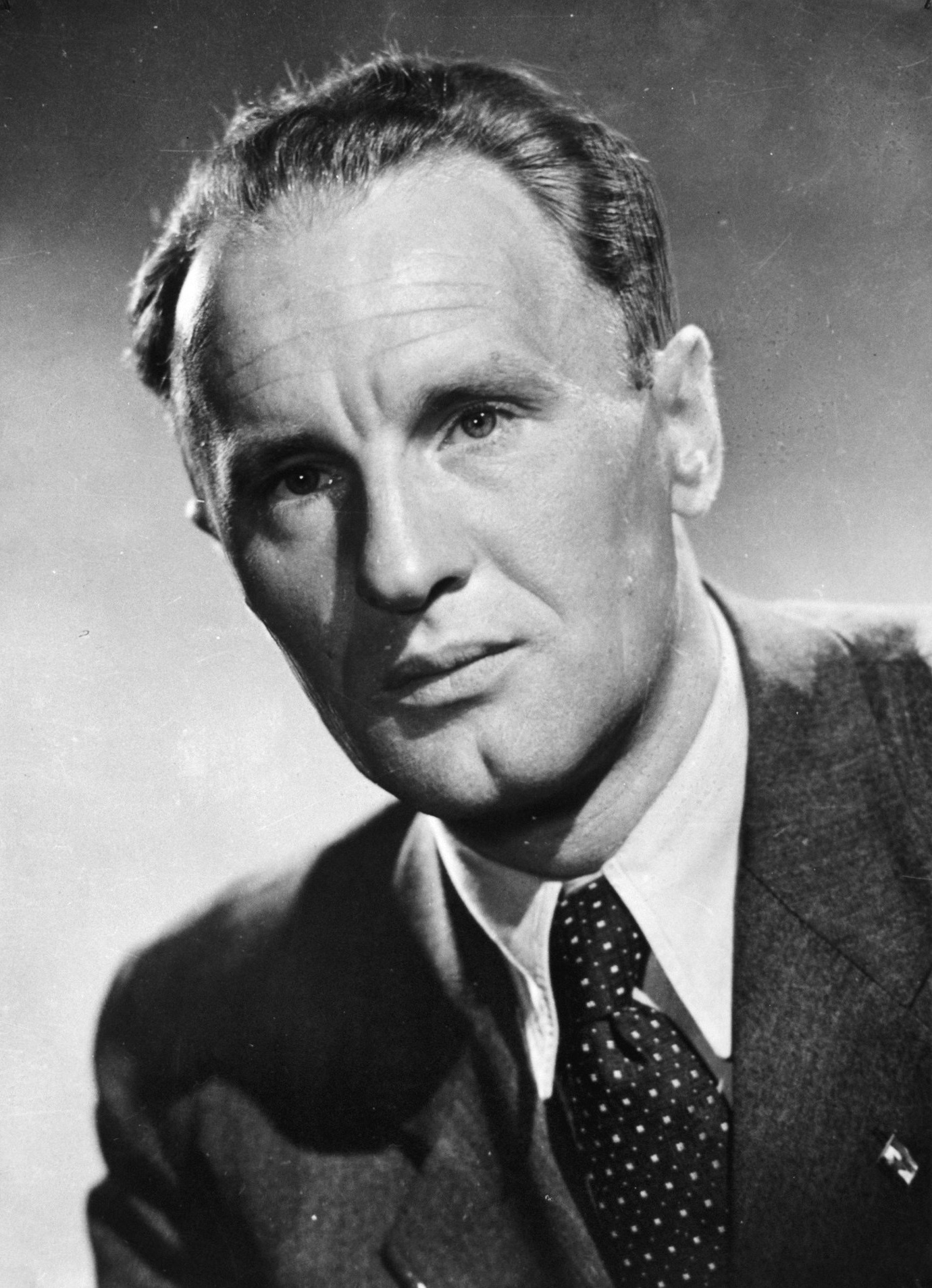
- Kádár circa 1962
- Premierships of János Kádár
- President: István Dobi (Note: as Chairman of the Council of Ministers of the Hungarian People's Republic)
- Party: MSZMP
- Election: 1963
- First term 4 November 1956 – 28 January 1958
- Cabinet: First Kádár Government
- Second term 13 September 1961 – 30 June 1965
- Cabinet: Second Kádár Government

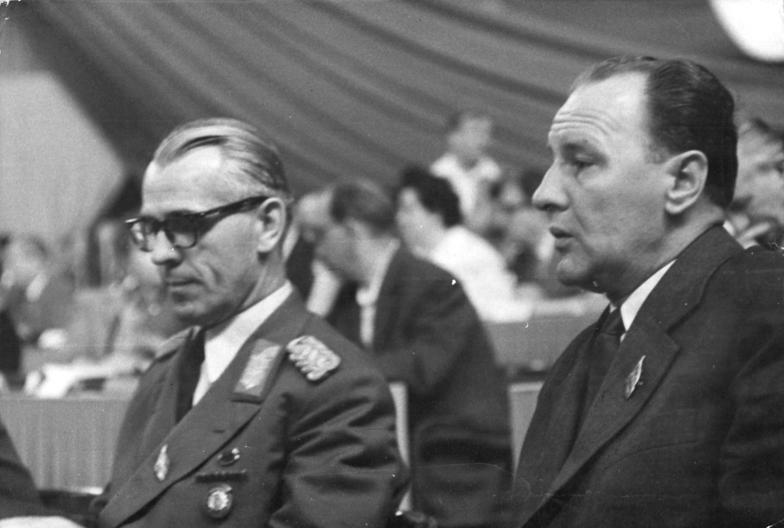
Willi Stoph and Kádár in 1958

Kádár assumed power in a critical situation. The country was under Soviet military administration for several months. The fallen leaders of the Communist party took refuge in the Soviet Union and were planning to regain power in Hungary. The Chinese, East German, and Czechoslovak leaders demanded severe reprisals against the perpetrators of the "counter-revolution". Despite the distrust surrounding the new leadership and the economic difficulties, Kádár was able to normalize the situation in a remarkably short time. This was due to the realization that, under the circumstances, it was impossible to break away from the Communist bloc. The Hungarian people realized that the promises of the West to help the Hungarian revolution were unfounded and that the logic of the Cold War determined the outcome. Hungary remained part of the Soviet sphere of influence with the tacit agreement of the West. Though influenced strongly by the Soviet Union, Kádár enacted a policy slightly contrary to that of Moscow, for example, allowing considerably large private plots for farmers of collective farms.

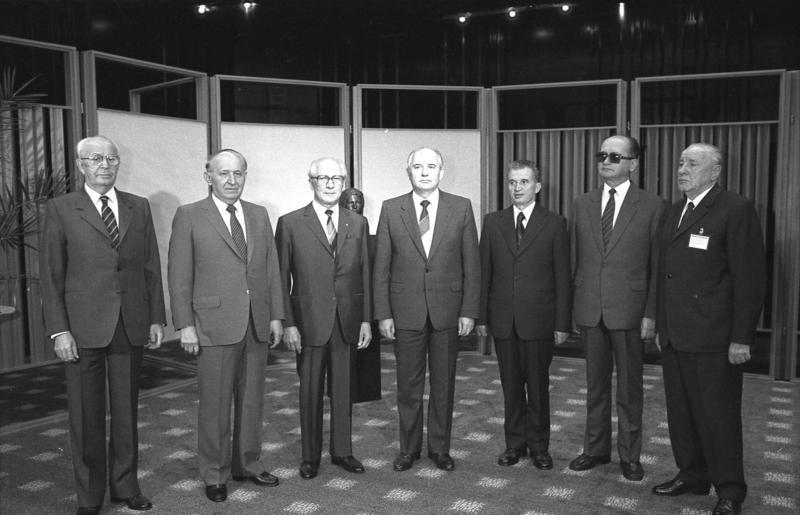
Leaders of the Eastern Bloc from left to right: Husák of Czechoslovakia, Zhivkov of Bulgaria, Honecker of East Germany, Gorbachev of the USSR, Ceaușescu of Romania, Jaruzelski of Poland and Kádár of Hungary (May 1987, East Berlin, East Germany)

Starting in the early 1960s, he gradually lifted Rákosi's more draconian measures against free speech and movement, and also eased some restrictions on cultural activities. He even tolerated samizdat publications to a far greater extent than his counterparts. As Kádár once said, "What kind of regime is it that doesn't have even a tiny little opposition, just for show? But there's also the fact that they can't go beyond a certain limit, and if they try, they'll pay for it." Hungarians had much more freedom than their Eastern Bloc counterparts to go about their daily lives.

The result was a regime that was far more humane than other Communist regimes, especially so when compared to the first seven years of undisguised Communist rule in Hungary. However, it was not a liberal regime in any sense. The Communists maintained absolute control over the government and also encouraged citizens to join party organizations. The National Assembly, like its counterparts in other Communist countries, did little more than approve decisions already made by the MSZMP and its Politburo. Voters were presented with a single list from the Patriotic People's Front, which was dominated by the MSZMP. All prospective candidates had to accept the Front's program in order to stand; indeed, Kádár and his advisers used the Front to weed out candidates they deemed unacceptable. The secret police, the Ministry of Internal Affairs III, while operating with somewhat more restraint than their counterparts in other Eastern Bloc countries (such as the AVH), was nonetheless a feared tool of government control. The Hungarian media remained under censorship that was considered fairly onerous by Western standards, but far less stringent than was the case in other Communist countries.

As a result of the relatively high standard of living, and more relaxed restrictions on speech, movement, and culture than that of other Eastern Bloc countries, Hungary was generally considered one of the better countries in which to live in Eastern Europe during the Cold War. The dramatic fall in living standards after the fall of Communism led to some nostalgia about the Kádár era. However, the relatively high living standards had their price in the form of 58% of GDP or US$22 bn state debt left behind by the Kádár régime. As mentioned above, the regime's cultural and social policies were still somewhat authoritarian; their impact on contemporary Hungarian culture is still a matter of considerable debate.

While Kádár's regime remained strictly loyal to the Soviet Union in foreign policy, its intent was to establish a national consensus around its domestic policies. In notable contrast to Rákosi, who repeatedly declared "he who is not with us is against us" in his rally speeches, Kádár declared that "who is not against us is with us". Kádár was the first Eastern European leader to develop closer ties with the Social Democratic parties of Western Europe. He also attempted to establish good relations with the United States, though could only go so far due to the limitations imposed by Kádár's ultimate commitment to communist internationalism.

When Khrushchev was ousted in 1964, Kádár had some kind words about the deposed Soviet leader, which was a unique gesture among Eastern Bloc leaders. Consequently, his relationship with Brezhnev was somewhat uneasy for a long time. Kádár tried to mediate between the leaders of the Czechoslovak reform movement of 1968 and the Soviet leadership to avert the danger of military intervention. When the Soviet leaders took the decision to intervene to suppress the Prague Spring, Kádár decided to participate in the Warsaw Pact operation.

The regression towards Stalinist economic policies in the Soviet Union at the end of the 1960s had an impact in Hungary. In the political-economic structure, which had been left untouched by the reforms, it was relatively easy for the "conservative" political offensive with Soviet support to take hold. Zoltán Komócsin, Béla Biszku and Árpád Pullai, who had aimed to stop economic reform and seize political power, defeated the reform wing, which was led by Rezső Nyers, Lajos Fehér and Jenő Fock, and implemented the renewed centralisation of the economy. Unqualified people were appointed to leading positions en masse, and a campaign was launched against certain sections of the intelligentsia.

At the same time, the oil crisis caused an unfavorable turn in the world economy for the Hungarian economy: Hungarian goods for export were paid less, while imported goods needed for economic growth and modernization became more expensive. Thus, the increase in real wages, which the leadership considered important, could only be covered by loans. In the early 1970s, credit was cheap and was freely used: by the end of the 1970s, $8 billion in debt had been accumulated.

During Kádár's rule, international tourism increased dramatically, with many tourists (including Hungarians who emigrated in 1956 or before) from Canada, the US, and Western Europe bringing much-needed money into Hungary. Hungary built strong relations with developing countries and many foreign students arrived. The "Holy Crown" (referred to in the media as the "Hungarian Crown", so as to prevent it carrying a political symbolism of the Horthy régime or an allusion to Christianity) and regalia of Hungarian kings were returned to Budapest by the United States in 1978.

Kádár was known for his simple and modest lifestyle and avoided the self-indulgence persona of other Communist leaders. Although he was never personally corrupt, he sometimes overlooked corrupt dealings of other members of the elite to an extent. To strengthen his popularity, whispering propaganda depicted him as totally intolerant to corruption by his underlings. Playing chess was one of his favorite pastimes. However, he was an avid hunter (hunting for sport used to be an aristocratic hobby before 1945 in Hungary and this pattern continued during the Communist era when it became a cherished pastime and occasion for the new elite to informally socialize and to get drunk), and was a member of an exclusive hunting association made up by Party leaders and other dignitaries. He wasn't a heavy drinker though and demanded modesty when he was present. Also, foreign guests often visited the Hungarian forests too, from the Shah of Iran through Fidel Castro to the King of Nepal, and Leonid Brezhnev hunted with Kádár several times. The popularity of this "gentleman's sport" among Communist leaders was marked by political decisions made on hunting excursions.

Kádár was awarded the Lenin Peace Prize (1975–76). He was also awarded the title Hero of the Soviet Union on 3 April 1964.

== Gallery ==
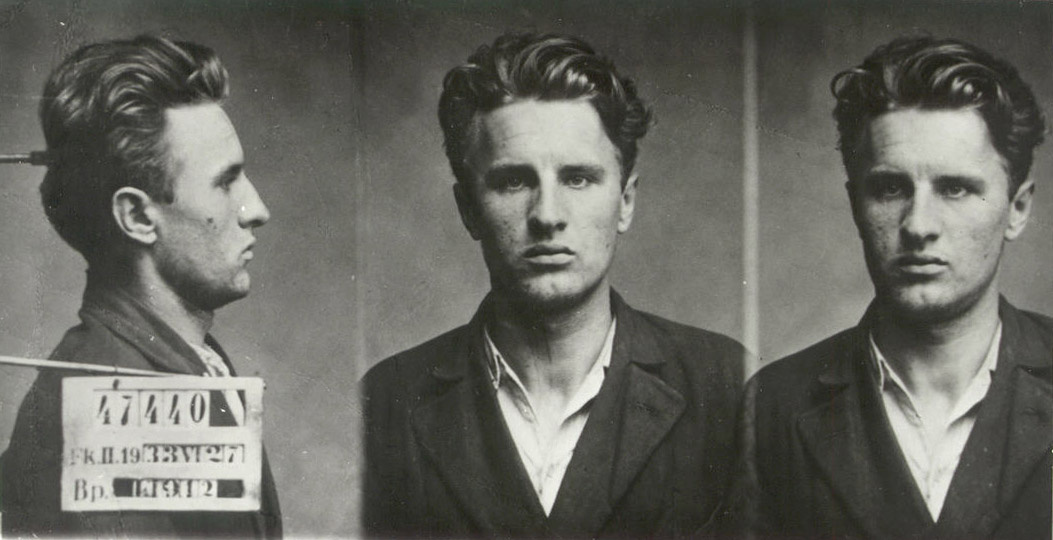
János Kádár's mugshot in 1933

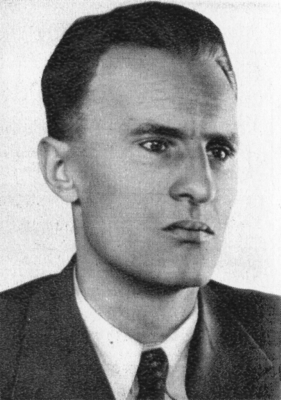
Kadar in 1942

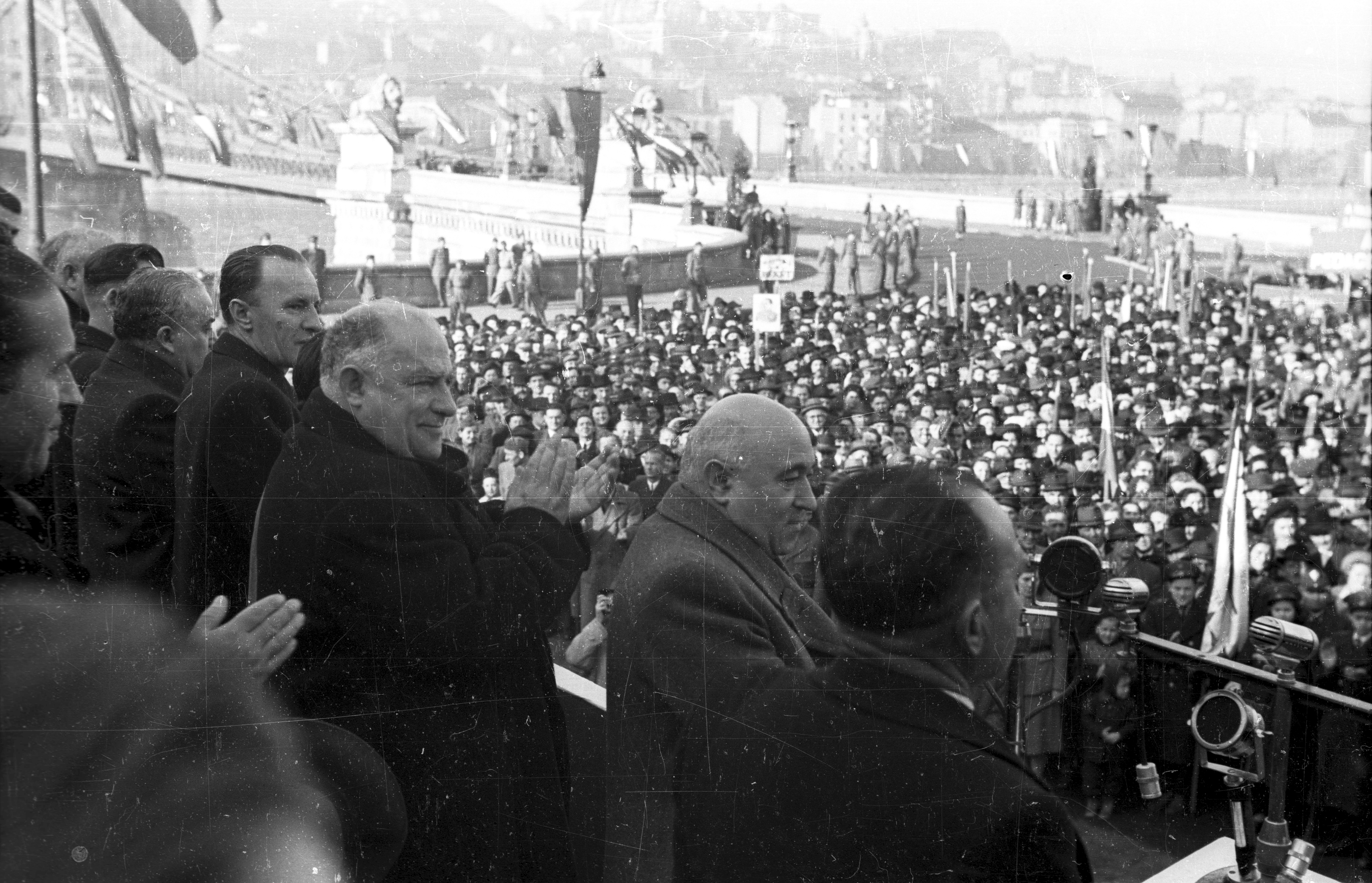
1949

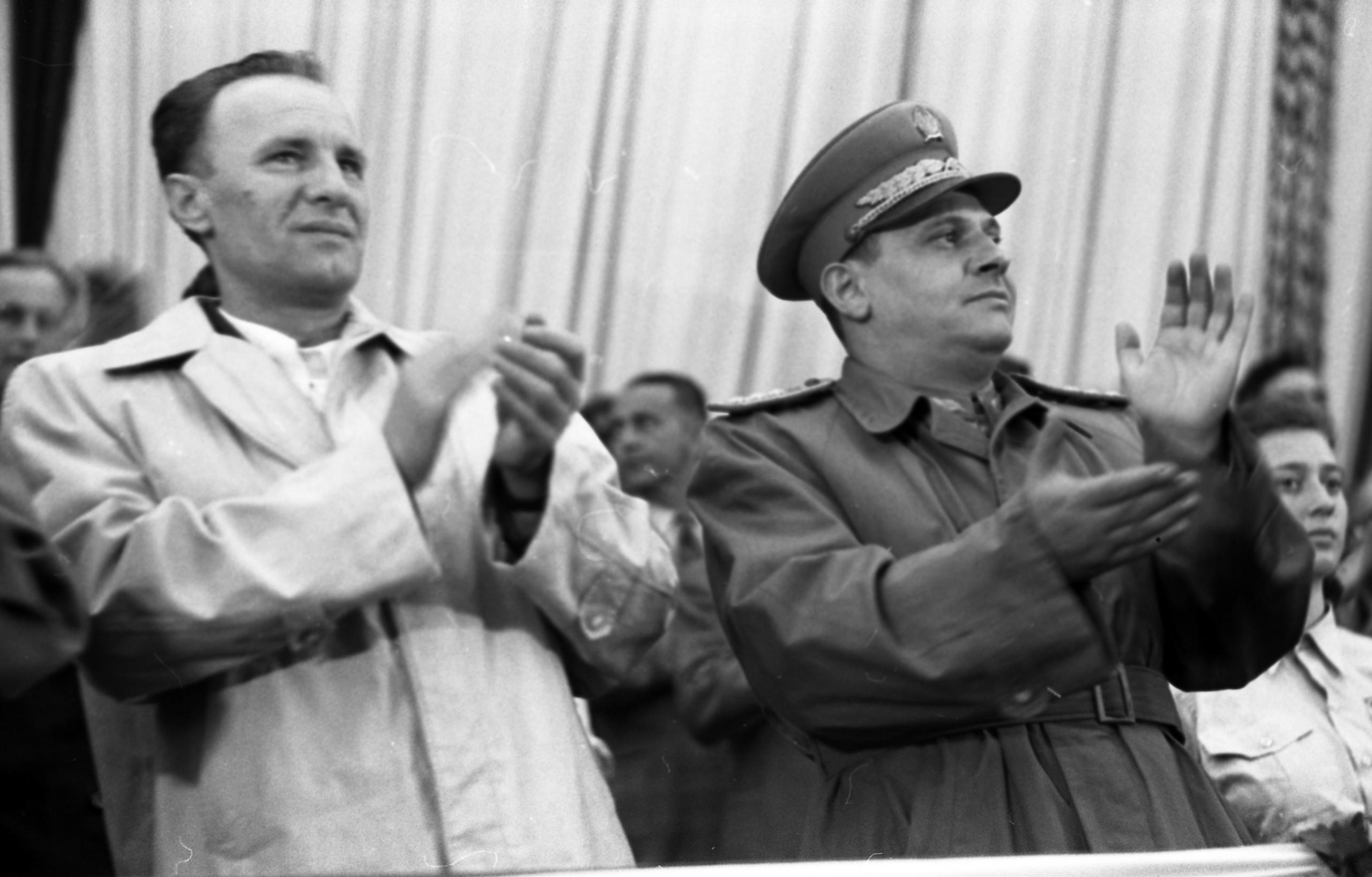
Kádár as Interior Minister and Mihály Farkas in 1950

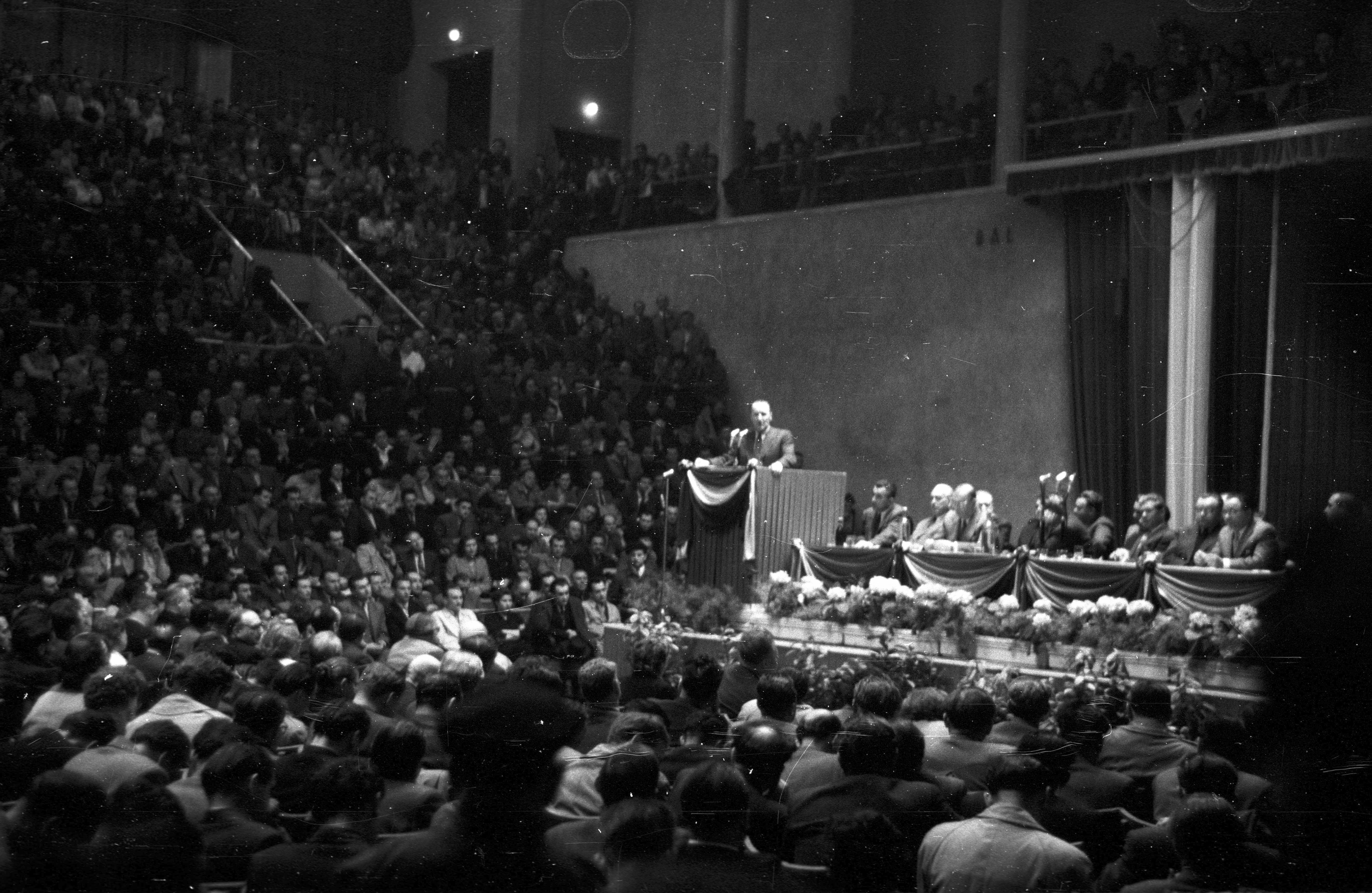
18 May 1956

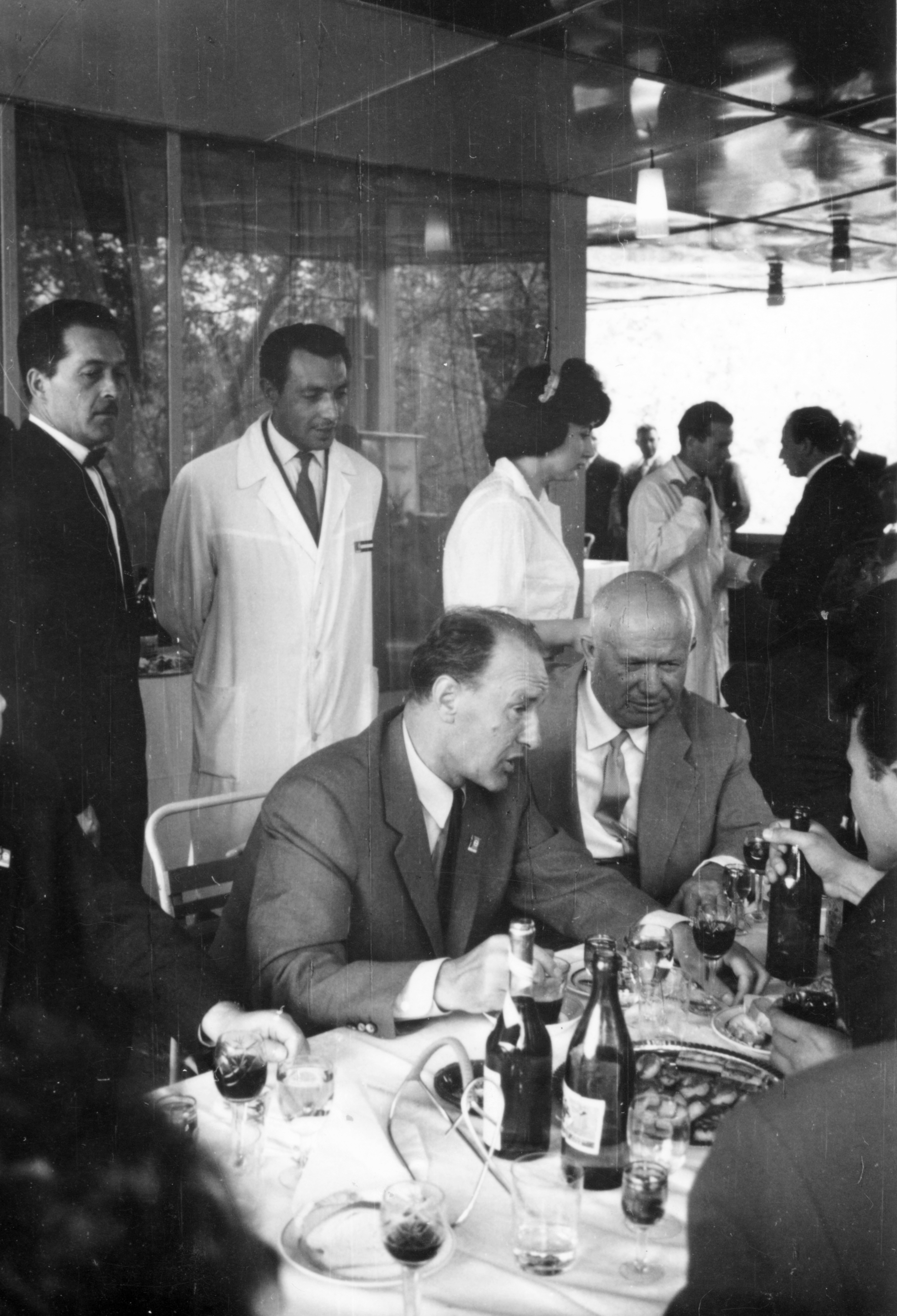
Nikita Khruschev and János Kádár, 1958

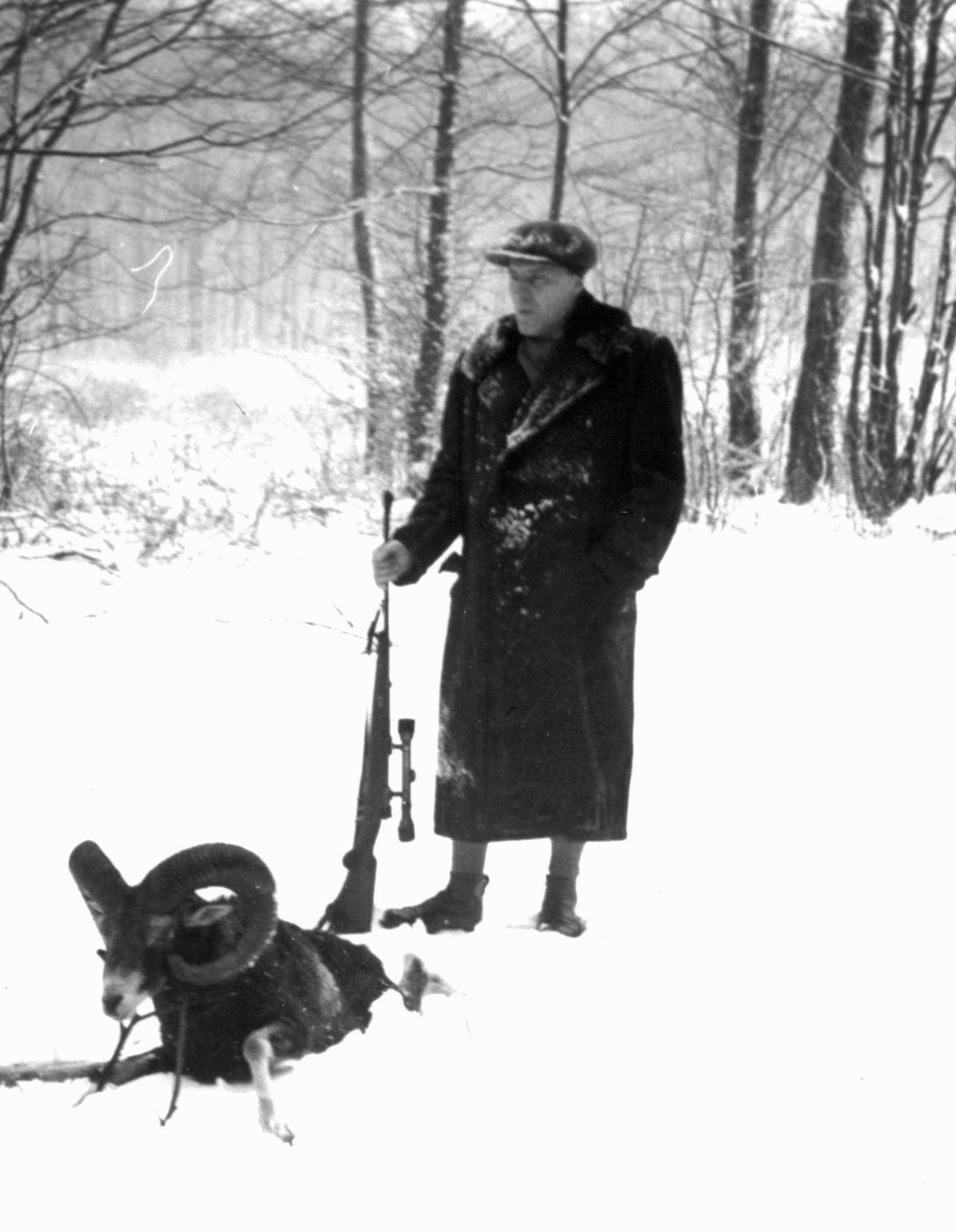
Janos Kádár hunting, 1960

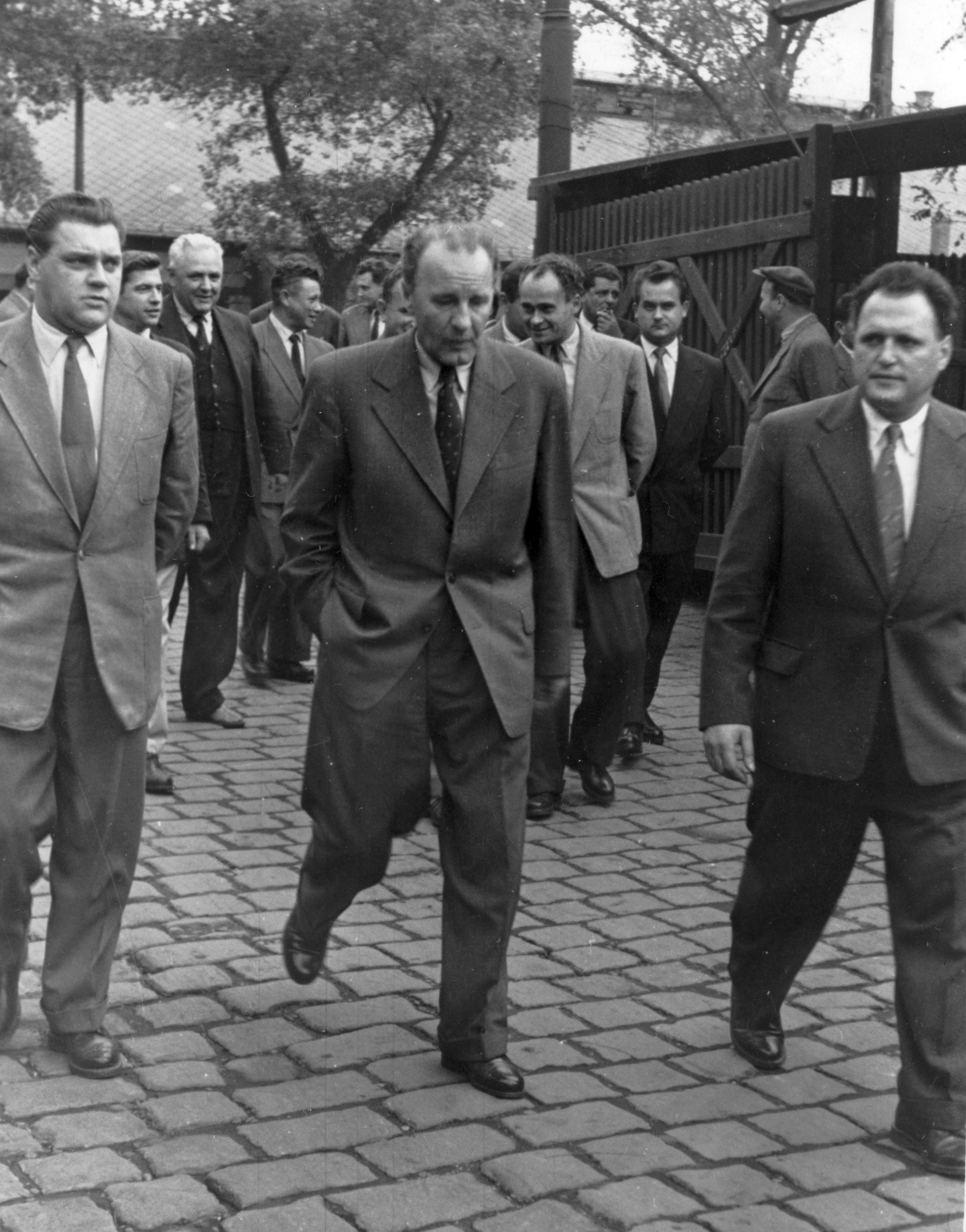
1966

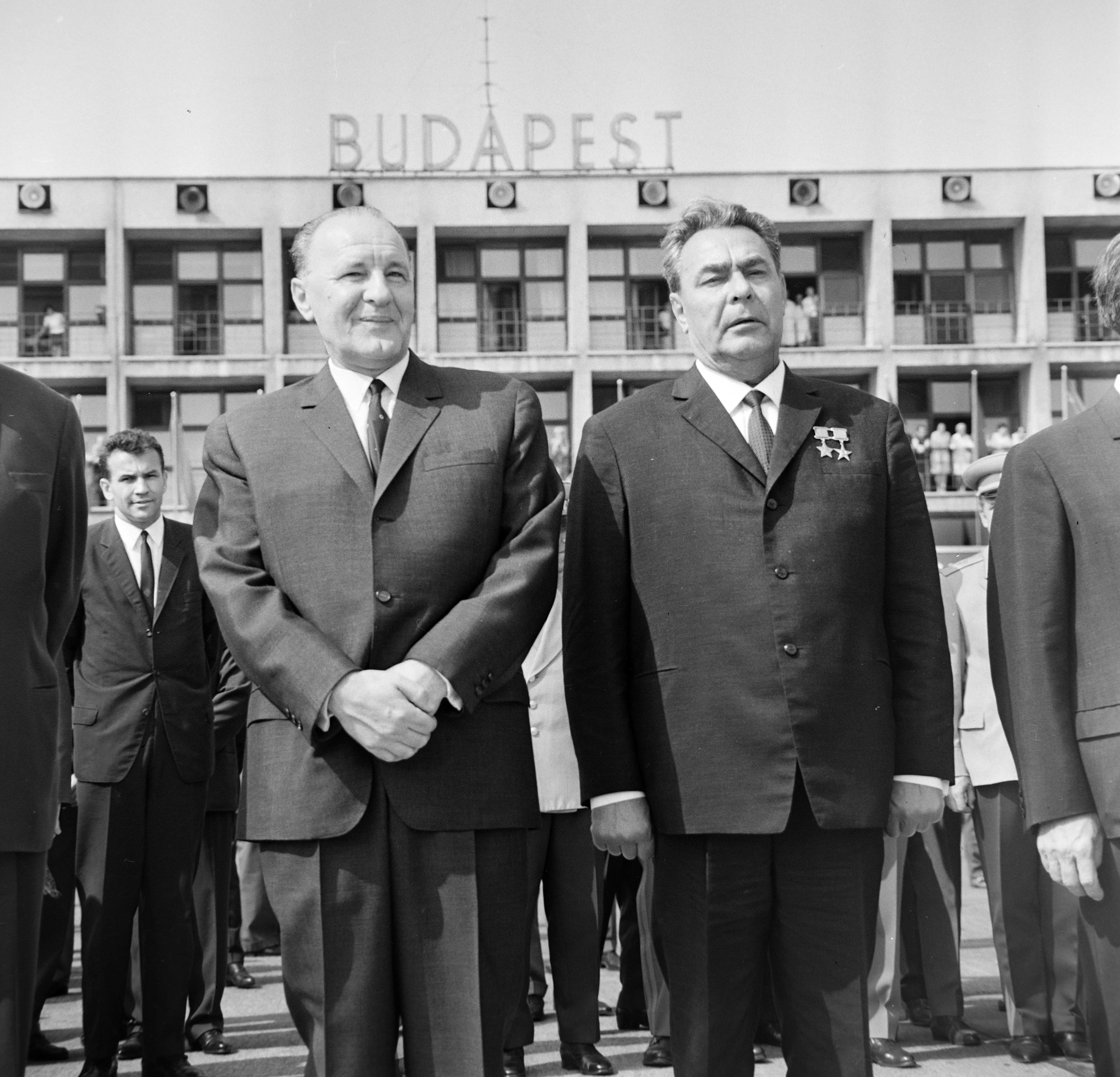
Leonid Brezhnev and János Kádár in Budapest, 1967

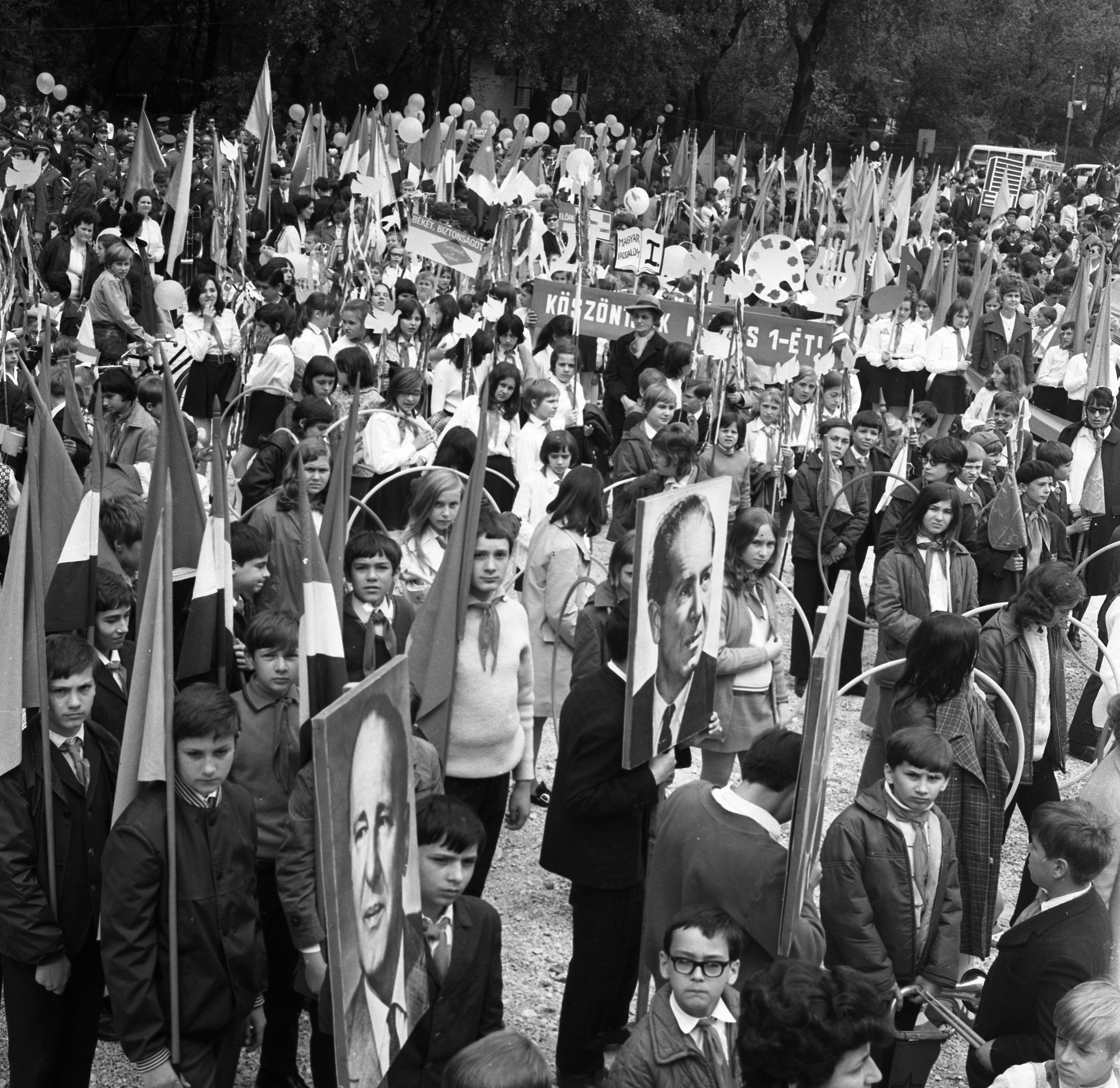
At Szentendre, 1970

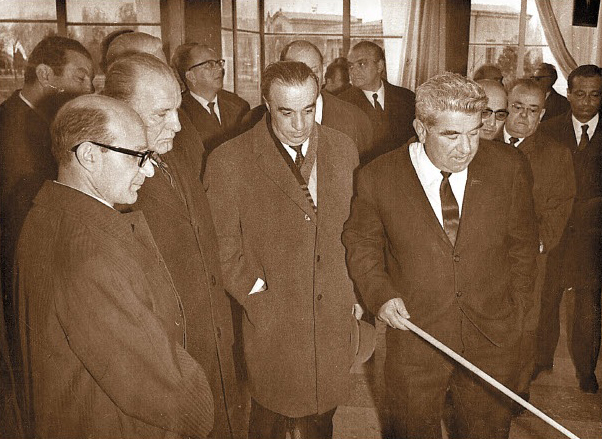
1971

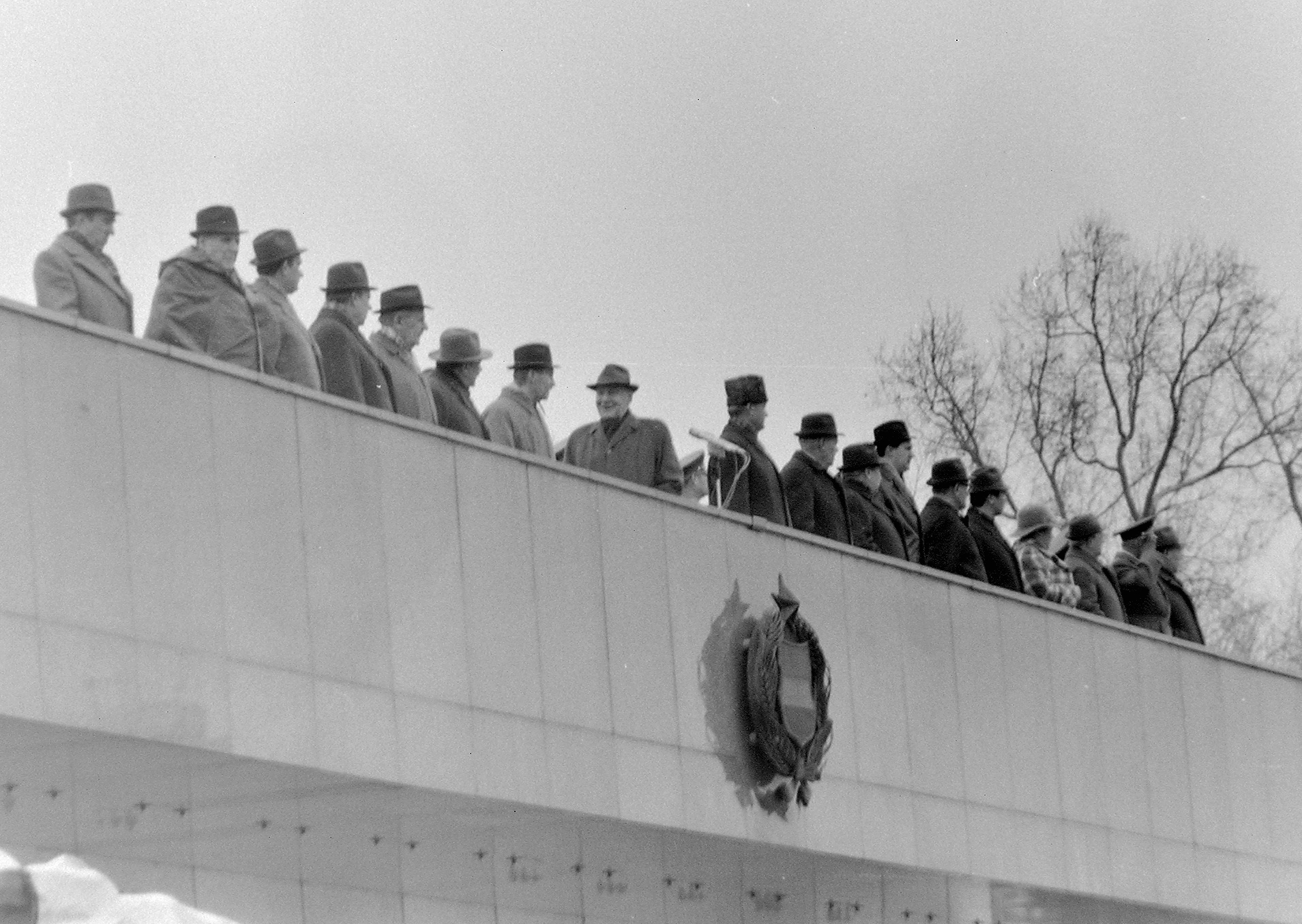
1976

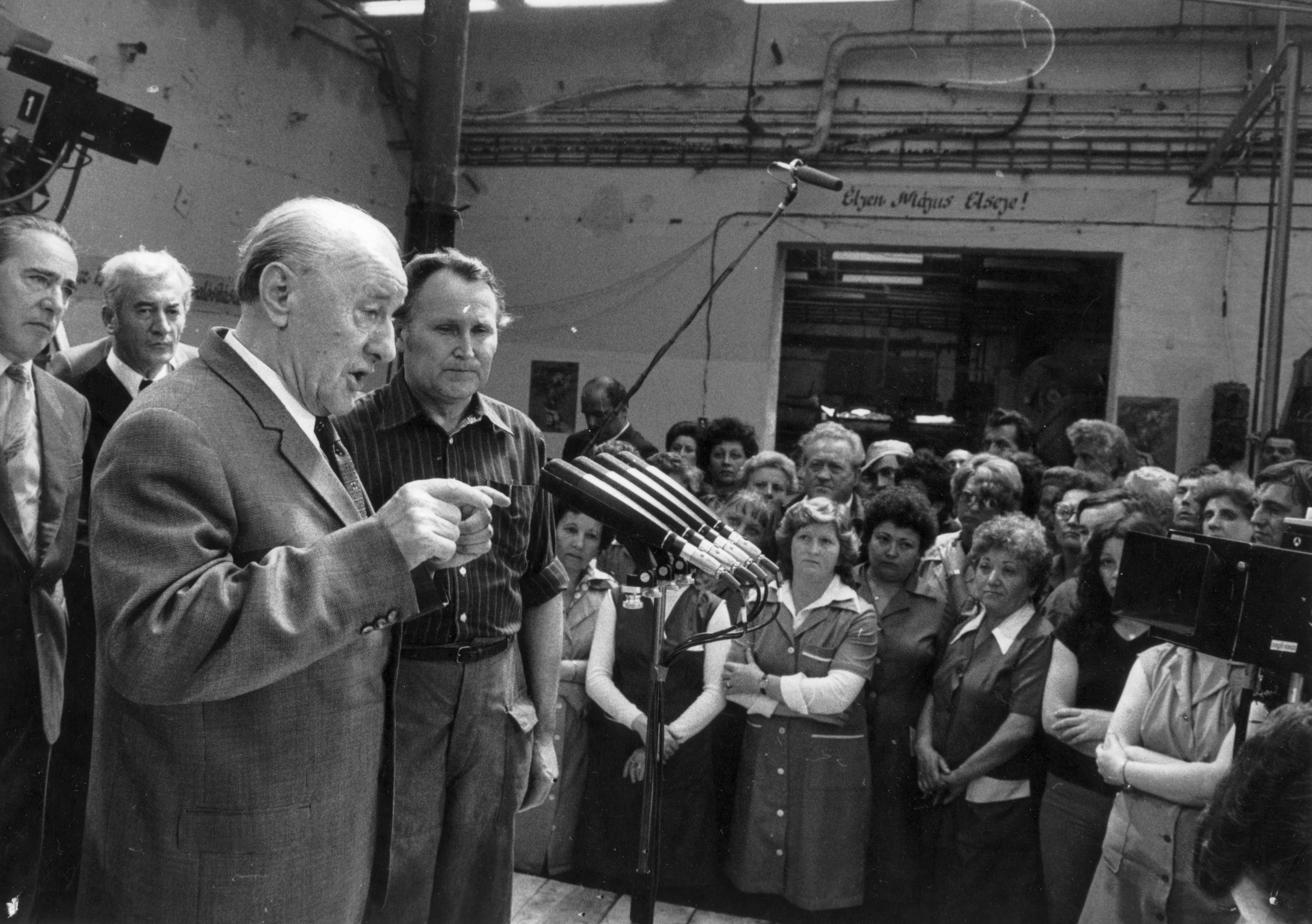
1982

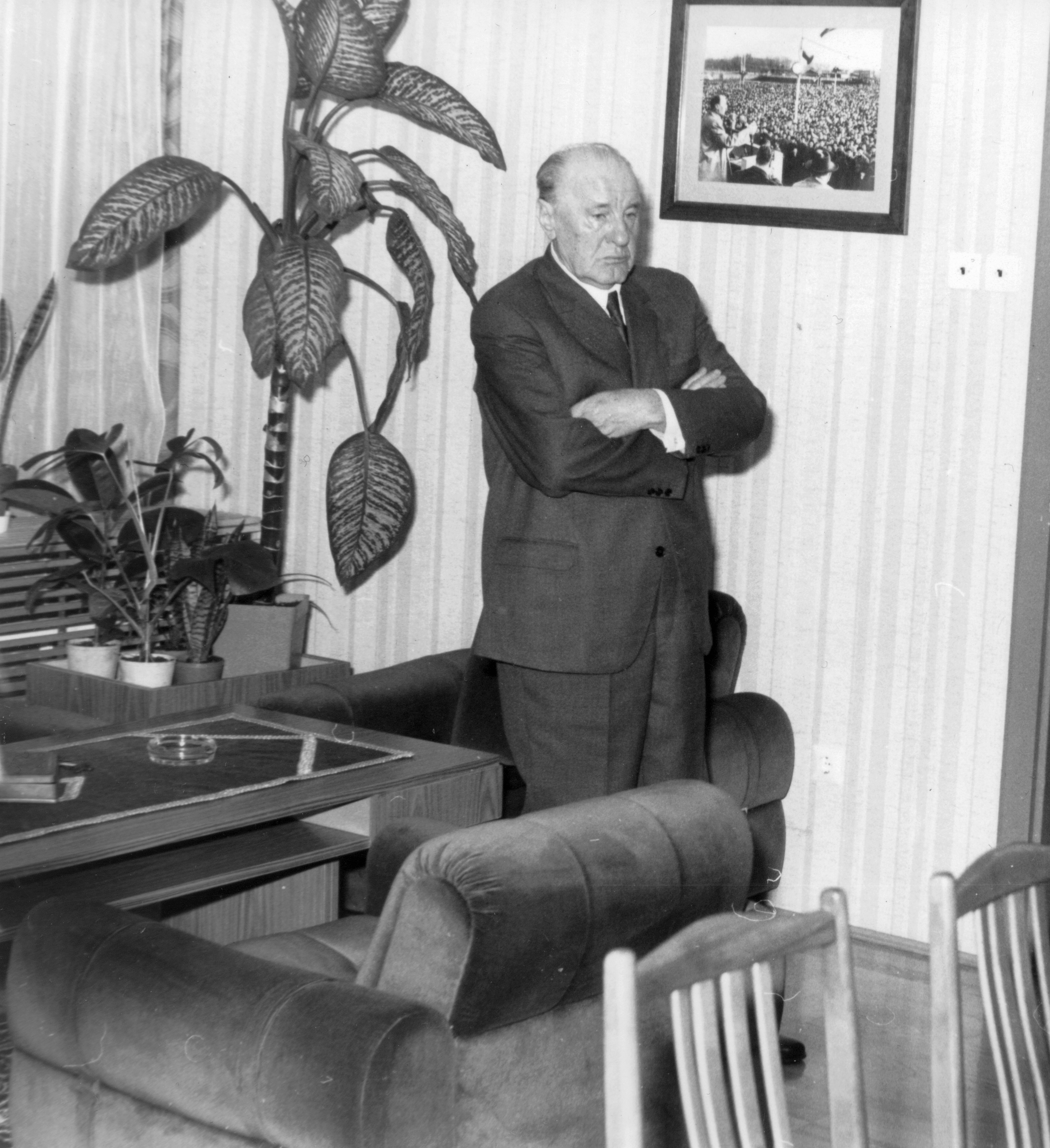
In his office, 1982

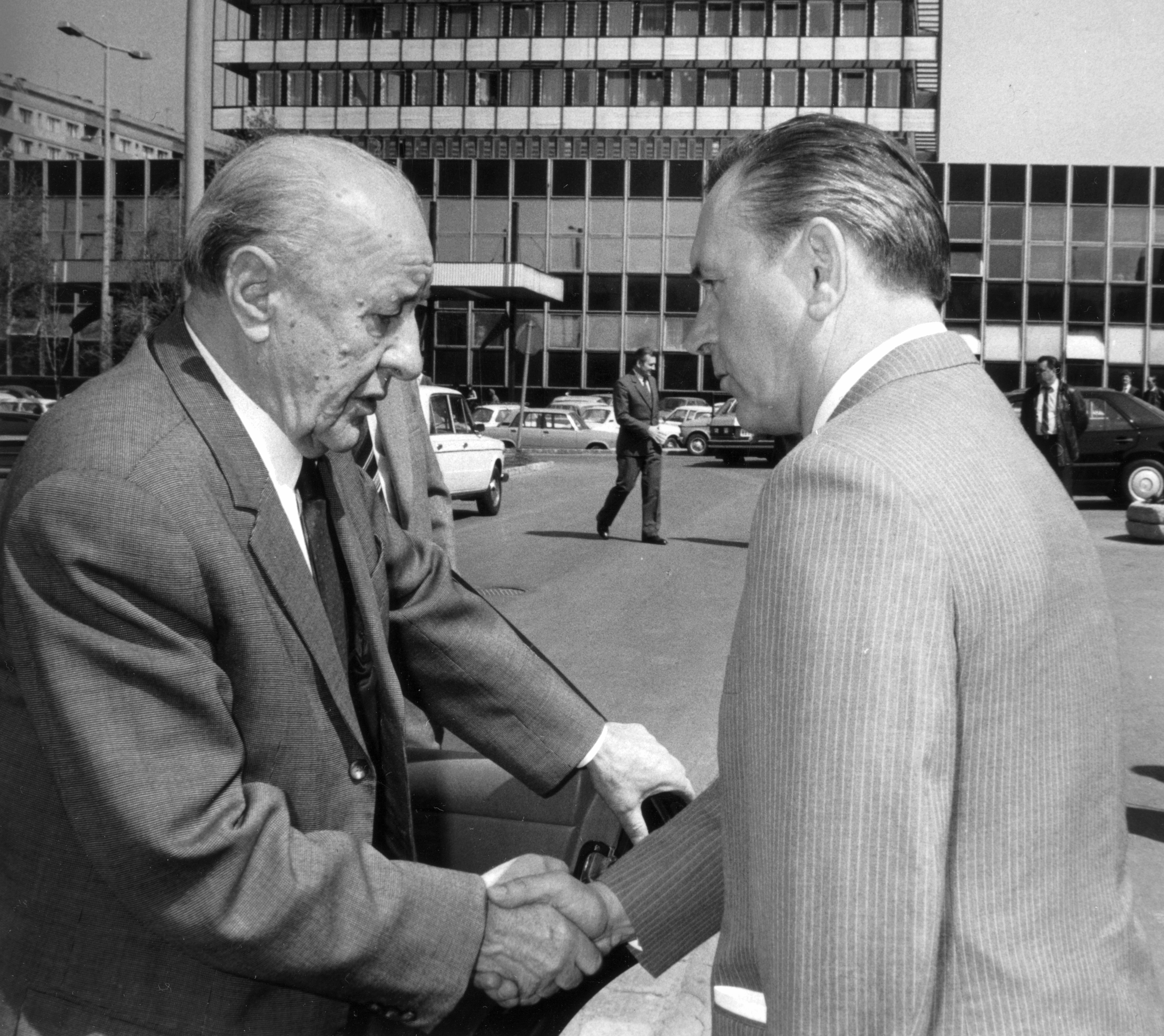
Kádár and Grósz in 1986

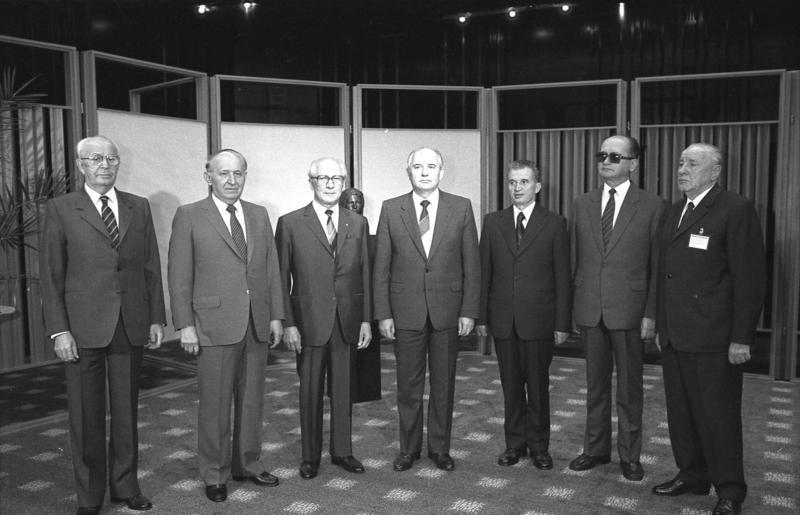
From left to right: Gustav Husak, Todor Zhivkov, Erich Honecker, Mikhail Gorbachev, Nicolae Ceaușescu, Wojciech Jaruzelski and János Kádár at a Warsaw Pact meeting on 29 May 1987.

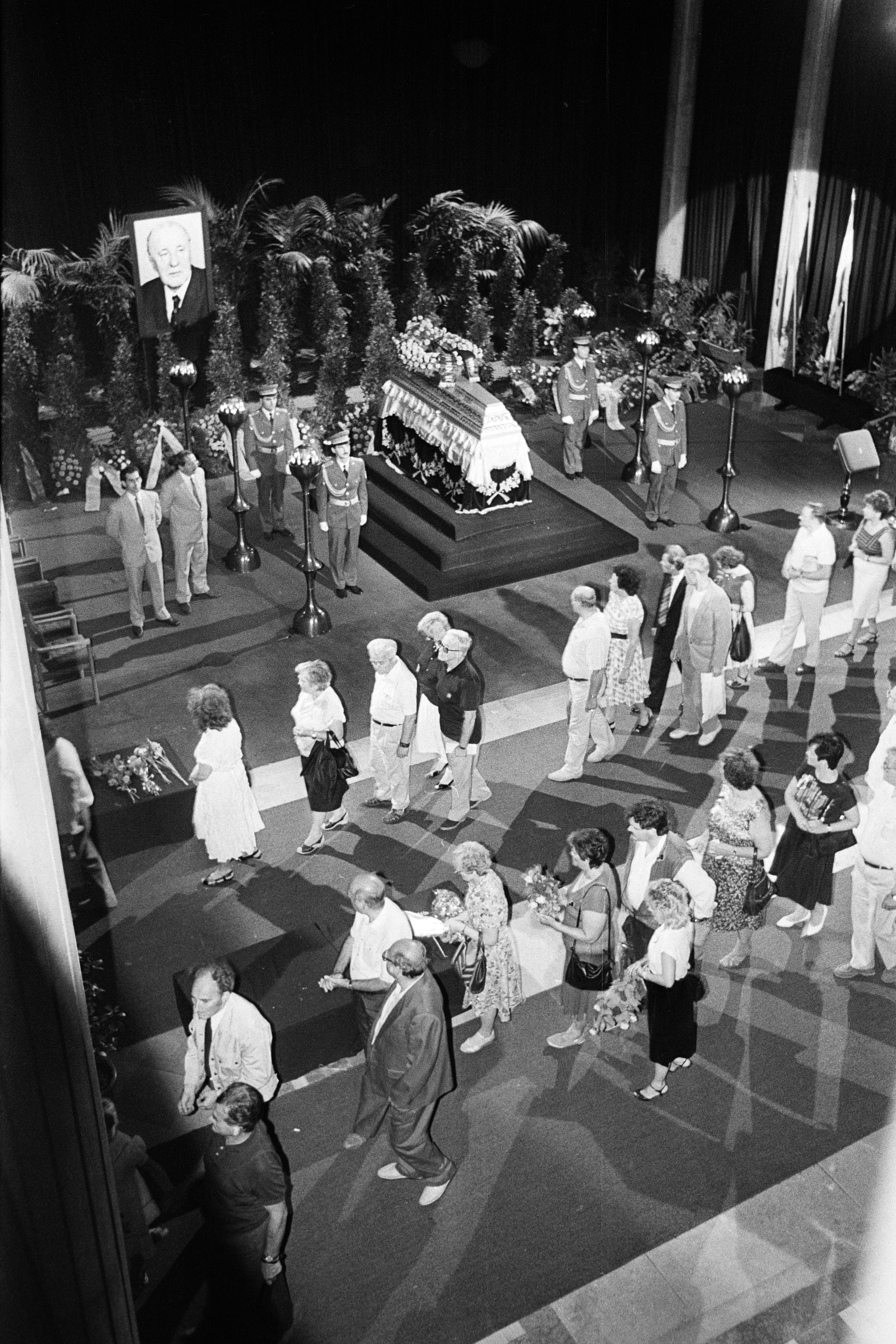
Catafalque of János Kádár, 1989

== Resignation, final months and death ==
János Kádár held power in Hungary until the "apparat coup" (which was conducted by Mihail Gorbachev behind the scenes) in the spring of 1988, when he resigned under pressure as General Secretary in the face of mounting economic difficulties and his own ill health. At a party conference in Budapest on 22 May 1988, at which half a dozen of his Politburo associates were also removed, Kádár announced his resignation and was officially replaced as General Secretary by Prime Minister Károly Grósz, who strove to continue Kádár's policies in a modified form adapted to the new circumstances. Kádár was named instead to the ceremonial position of Party President. He did not wish to be re-elected to the Political Committee, the most important decision-making body of the party. Nevertheless, the post allowed him the right to speak at Central Committee plenums. By May 1989, Kádár was showing unmistakable signs of mental deterioration; his increasingly incoherent speeches were becoming an embarrassment. Doctors encouraged him to go on vacation in the Crimea, but Kádár balked; he remembered how Rákosi had died in Soviet exile and was wary of the same fate. On 8 May, Kádár lost his remaining posts; officially, he retired for health reasons. Grósz and his associates were in no position to resist, as they were in turn were being sidelined by a faction of young "radical reformers" who set out to dismantle Communism altogether and rehabilitate the party's image ahead of free elections due the following year.

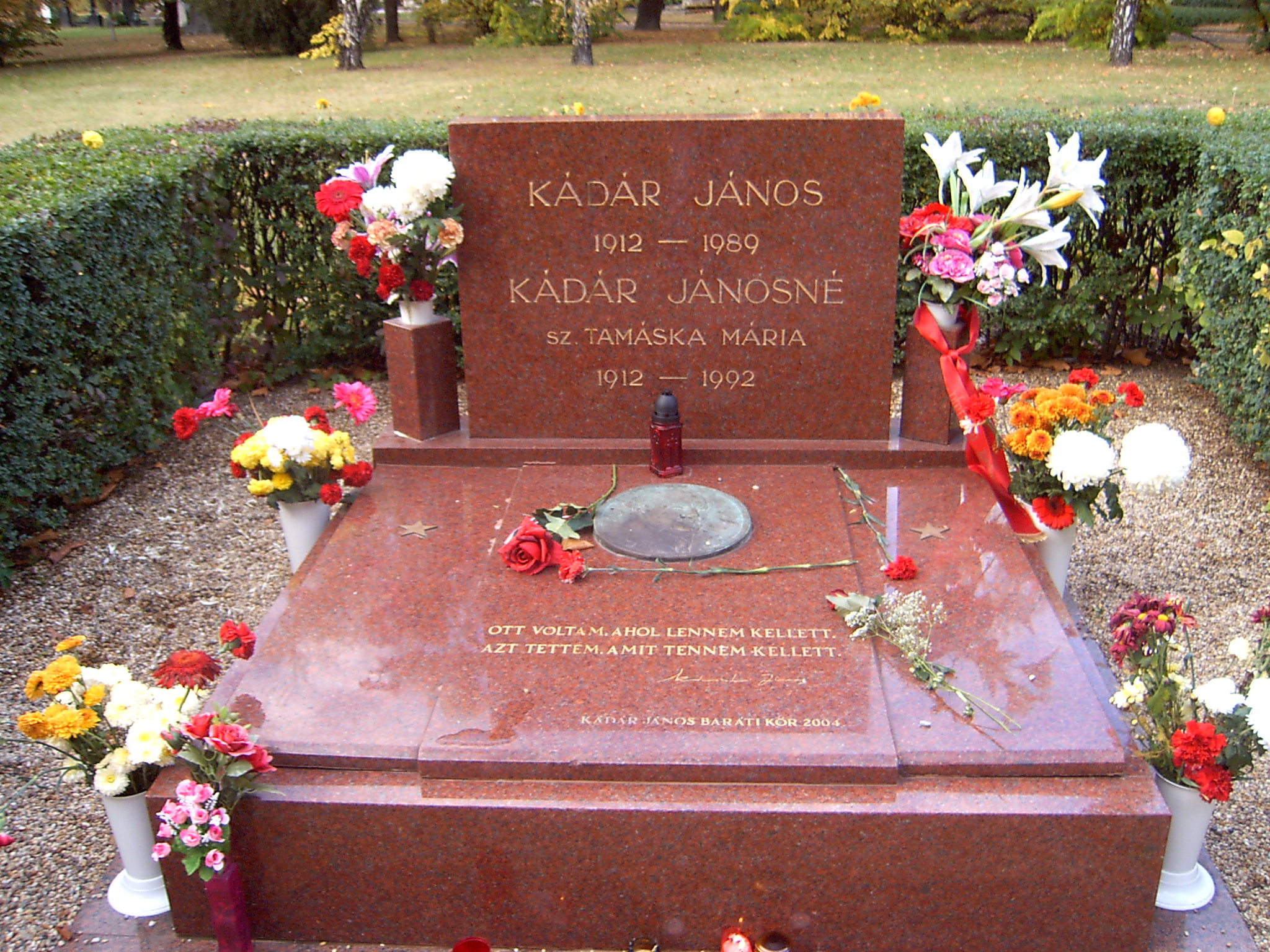
Kádár's grave

On 12 April 1989 Kádár unexpectedly appeared and made a rambling, incoherent speech at the closed meeting of the Central Committee. By the "right of the last word", he wanted to confess about his negotiations in 1956 in Moscow (about which he never spoke publicly) and about the conviction and execution of Imre Nagy. But all the changes that occurred in Eastern Europe and Hungary between 1956 and 1989 were at the same time in his head. An interpretation of Kádár's thoughts was offered by Mihály Kornis, who gave a lecture about János Kádár. According to Miklós Németh's testimony, in late May or early June 1989, a few weeks before his death, Kádár asked a Roman Catholic priest to hear his confession, which some have theorised as a sign of a possible revelation and conversion to Christianity.

Kádár died of cancer on 6 July 1989 aged 77, three months before the formal end of the regime he had largely created. Kádár's grave at the Kerepesi Cemetery in Budapest was vandalized on 2 May 2007 as a number of his bones, including his skull, were dug up and stolen, along with his wife Mária Tamáska's urn. A message reading "murderers and traitors may not rest in holy ground 1956–2006" (taken from a song titled "Neveket akarok hallani" written by the rock band Kárpátia) was written nearby. The two dates refer to the Hungarian Revolution of 1956 and the 2006 protests in Hungary, respectively. This act was received with widespread revulsion across the political and societal spectrum in Hungary. Police investigations focused on extremist right-wing groups which had been aspiring to "carry out an act that would create a big bang".

== Legacy ==
Kádár's legacy remains disputed in Hungary. Supporters of Kádár argue that the Kádár era was one of peace and stability with widespread job security and robust social protections for average people. Others argue that although Kádár increased the standard of living for Hungarians, and instituted broad liberalization, the country was still fundamentally a dictatorship and a Soviet satellite state.

He is considered one of the most influential figures of 20th century Hungarian history along with István Tisza and Miklós Horthy. A research has found that according to 6% of respondents he was "the greatest Hungarian", finishing 3rd from a list of 10 choices.

Polls indicate that nostalgia for the Kádár era remains widespread in Hungary. According to a 2020 poll carried out by Policy Solutions in Hungary, 54 percent of Hungarians believe most people had a better life under Kádár, compared to 31 percent who say life for most people was worse under Kádár.

Surveys indicate over 70% of Hungarians view the János Kádár period more favorably than post-1989.

== Honours and awards ==
=== National honours ===
- Hero of Socialist Labour, thrice (1962; 1972; 1982)

=== Foreign honours ===
- (Czechoslovakia) Grand Cross of the Order of the White Lion (1949)
- Hero of the Soviet Union (1964)
- (Soviet Union) Order of Lenin, twice (1964; 1972)
- (Socialist Federal Republic of Yugoslavia) Order of the Yugoslav Great Star (1964)
- (Soviet Union) Lenin Peace Prize "for peace between nations" (1977)
- (Cuba) Order of José Martí (1982)
- (Czechoslovakia) Order of Klement Gottwald (1982)
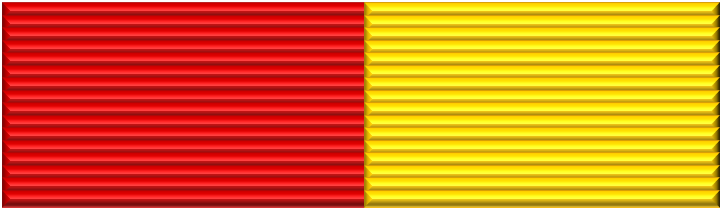
- (Vietnam) Gold Star Order (1982)

== In popular culture ==
An interpretation of events in Kádár's political and personal life, beginning circa 1945, including an association with the trial, execution, reburial, and atonement of László Rajk, and ending with the Hungarian Revolution of 1956, are portrayed in Robert Ardrey's 1958 play, Shadow of Heroes.

== Notes ==
Party political offices
Preceded by Ernő Gerő	General Secretary of the Hungarian Socialist Workers' Party; 25 October 1956–22 May 1988	Succeeded by Károly Grósz
Political offices
Preceded by László Rajk	Minister of the Interior; 5 August 1948–23 June 1950	Succeeded by Sándor Zöld
Preceded by Imre Nagy	Prime Minister of Hungary; 4 November 1956–28 January 1958	Succeeded by Ferenc Münnich
Preceded by Ferenc Münnich	Prime Minister of Hungary; 13 September 1961–30 June 1965	Succeeded by Gyula Kállai
