= István Kovács (politician) =

Hungarian politician (1911–2011)

István Kovács (24 October 1911 – 23 December 2011) was a Hungarian Communist politician who served in the Political Committee of the Hungarian Working People's Party (MDP) and as a member of the Presidential Council of the People's Republic of Hungary which functioned as collective head of state in Hungary from 1949 to 1989.

He was born in Ditró (now Ditrău, Romania).
