= Rákosi Government =

Government of the Hungary (1952–1953)

Cabinet of Mátyás Rákosi
- 49th Cabinet of Hungary
- 1952–1953
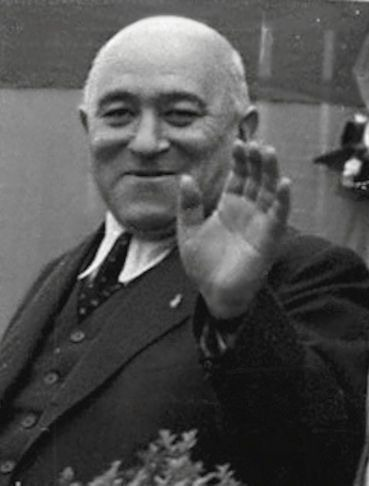
- Date formed: 14 August 1952
- Date dissolved: 4 July 1953

People and organisations
- Chairman of the Presidential Council: István Dobi
- First Secretary of the Hungarian Working People's Party: Mátyás Rákosi
- Chairman of the Council of Ministers: Mátyás Rákosi
- Deputy Chairmen of the Council of Ministers: Ernő Gerő Árpád Házi István Hidas Károly Kiss Imre Nagy
- No. of ministers: 29
- Total no. of members: 37
- Member party: Hungarian Working People's Party (as part of Patriotic People's Front)
- Status in legislature: Majority party 285 / 402 (71%)
- Opposition party: None (one-party state)

History
- Election: 1949
- Predecessor: Dobi
- Successor: I. Nagy I

The Rákosi government led Hungary for nearly ten months, spanning from August 14, 1952, to July 4, 1953. It officially operated as the Council of Ministers of the Hungarian People's Republic and was helmed by Mátyás Rákosi, who served as the Secretary General of the Hungarian Workers' Party.

During its tenure, the Rákosi government oversaw a multitude of ministries, and it held the distinction of being the largest employer in Hungary during that time. While the Revolutionary Governing Council also featured multiple people's commissars leading ministries simultaneously, the Rákosi government managed 26 ministries with a 31-member team between December 6, 1952, and July 4, 1953.

Throughout its 325-day existence, the Rákosi government saw a total of 33 members participate in its operations.

== Politics ==
Having held a de facto leadership role in the country for several years, Rákosi consolidated crucial positions within both the Communist Party and the state. He simultaneously served as the Secretary General of the MDP and the President of the Council of Ministers for nearly a year. Nonetheless, the second phase of his governance, which followed Stalin's death on March 5, 1953, eventually led to his partial downfall in the summer of 1953. This transition saw Imre Nagy taking over as prime minister with his first term in office.

In the context of the one-party system, the members of the Rákosi government consisted of MDP members or non-party backers of the Communists. In the post-war years, the latter aligned with the coalition parties that worked with the MDP: József Bognár was associated with the FKgP, while József Darvas and Ferenc Erdei were affiliated with the National Peasant Party. Notably, none of the government members represented the left-wing social democrats merged into the MDP.

== Changes in its composition ==
Formation The establishment of the Rákosi government resulted in just one change in the council of ministers compared to the preceding Dobi government: Mátyás Rákosi, who had hitherto served as István Dobi's sole deputy, assumed the position of his predecessor. Dobi had been elected as the president of the Presidential Council, and Rákosi took over as the head of the government. (Former small farmer Dobi, in turn, succeeded former social democrat Sándor Rónai as the head of the Presidential Council, and Rónai became the president of the Parliament.)

Minister of State Ernő Gerő and the heads of the 23 ministries retained their positions without exception. Furthermore, no deputy president was elected, resulting in the initial membership of the Rákosi government numbering 25 individuals.

== Change of government on November 14, 1952 ==
A significant government reorganization occurred on November 14, 1952. From that point onward, the Council of Ministers had five deputy presidents. Four of these individuals were previously ministers, namely Minister of State Ernő Gerő, Minister of the Interior Árpád Házi, Minister of Foreign Affairs Károly Kiss, and Minister of Collections Imre Nagy. Additionally, István Hidas held the position of secretary for the Budapest Party Committee. While the number and names of the ministries remained unchanged, there were adjustments in the leadership of certain ministries. The positions of the newly elected deputy prime ministers were partly occupied by new appointees. The role of the collection minister was assumed by József Tisza, who had previously served as the National Planning Office deputy president. József Györe Szabolcs-Szatmár, the MDP secretary for the county, took over the headship of the Ministry of the Interior. Erik Molnár, the Minister of Foreign Affairs, transitioned to the position of Minister of Justice, with his first deputy, Gyula Décsi, succeeding him. No state minister was chosen to replace Gerő, and this position remained vacant until October 1956. Consequently, while no one left the government, it expanded to include four new members, totaling 29 in all.

== Organization of new ministries on December 6, 1952 ==
On December 6, 1952, the number of ministries increased by three. An independent Ministry of Higher Education was established, headed by academician Tibor Erdey-Grúz, a chemistry professor and general secretary of the Hungarian Academy of Sciences. The Ministry of Smelting and Machinery was divided into two: the Ministry of General Machinery, which continued under the previous minister, István Kossa, and the Ministry of Metallurgy. The latter existed for a total of seven months, during which time it did not even have an independent minister but was "temporarily" managed by the Minister of Medium Machinery, Mihály Zsofinyecz. Additionally, from the Ministry of Mines and Energy, the Chemical Industry Ministry was replaced by chemical engineer Gergely Szabó, who, at only 31 years old, led the National Association of People's Colleges as its former secretary general.

With these changes, the Rákosi government reached its largest membership, totaling 31 people, with one minister overseeing two ministries. Nine out of the 26 ministries were responsible for various sectors of the industry.

Further personnel changes occurred later on. Gyula Décsi, who had previously been a lieutenant colonel of the ÁVH before his Ministry of Justice assignment starting in 1950, was arrested on January 16, 1953, after two months as minister. He was replaced by Béla Kovács on February 2, 1953. Minister of Health Anna Ratkó was succeeded on April 18, 1953. Having held trade union positions subsequently, she was replaced by Sándor Zsoldos, the head of the health department of the Somogy County Council.

== Members of the Rákosi government not in the Imre Nagy government ==
Some members of the outgoing government assumed prominent party positions. Mátyás Rákosi concurrently held the roles of President of the Council of Ministers and Secretary General of the MDP, the latter being a position he retained. Deputy Prime Minister Károly Kiss, who chaired the Central Control Committee (KEB) of the MKP, MDP, and MSZMP uninterrupted from 1946 to 1957, held his relinquished government positions simultaneously. Minister of National Defense Mihály Farkas, a staunch ally of Rákosi, was removed from the Political Committee in June and temporarily held no position. However, leveraging his Moscow connections, he soon aligned himself with the new direction and personally supported Imre Nagy. By August, he returned to the PB and assumed the role of the KV's secretary.

Some politicians removed from the government secured high state positions as compensation: Foreign Minister Erik Molnár was elected President of the Supreme Court by the Parliament on the day the new government was formed, and Minister of Culture József Révai was chosen as Deputy President of the Presidential Council.

Nonetheless, many ousted government members continued to hold influential roles in ministries and other government bodies. Two former government members transitioned to managing central offices under the government: Deputy Prime Minister Árpád Házi assumed the presidency of the State Control Center (a position he had already held from 1949 to 1951), and István Kossa, Minister of General Machine Industry, led the Office of Manpower Reserves. Four outgoing ministers retained their positions as first deputy ministers in newly merged ministries. (On January 27, 1951, the role of State Secretary was abolished and replaced by the Minister's first deputy.) Antal Apró, Minister of Construction Materials at the Ministry of Construction; Sándor Czottner, Minister of Mines and Energy at the Ministry of Heavy Industry; Antal Katona, Minister of Posts at the Ministry of Transport and Posts; and János Szabó, Minister of Local Industry, assumed roles as first deputy ministers in the Ministry of Light Industry. Three former ministers (not first deputies) also became deputy ministers: Minister of the Interior József Györe, continuing in his former portfolio; Minister of Chemical Industry Gergely Szabó, within the consolidated Ministry of Heavy Industry; and Minister of Foreign Trade András Szobek, within the Ministry of Internal and Foreign Trade. Minister of Justice Béla Kovács, who became a miner after completing a one-year military academy in 1950, led the Ministry of Defense's judicial group.

== Ministries ==
The government consisted of:

Cabinet
Portfolio	Minister	Took office	Left office	Party
President of the Council of Ministers	Mátyás Rákosi	14 August 1952	4 July 1953	MDP
Minister of State	Ernő Gerő	14 August 1952	14 November 1952	MDP
Deputy Presidents of the Council of Ministers	Ernő Gerő	14 November 1952	4 July 1953	MDP
Deputy Presidents of the Council of Ministers	Árpád Házi	14 November 1952	4 July 1953	MDP
Deputy Presidents of the Council of Ministers	István Hidas	14 November 1952	4 July 1953	MDP
Deputy Presidents of the Council of Ministers	Károly Kiss	14 November 1952	4 July 1953	MDP
Deputy Presidents of the Council of Ministers	Imre Nagy	14 November 1952	4 July 1953	MDP
Minister of Agriculture	Ferenc Erdei	14 August 1952	4 July 1953	MDP
Ministry of Construction	Lajos Szíjártó	14 August 1952	4 July 1953	MDP
Minister of Finance	Károly Olt	14 August 1952	4 July 1953	MDP
Foreign Minister	Károly Kiss	14 August 1952	14 November 1952	MDP
Interior Minister	Árpád Házi	14 August 1952	14 November 1952	MDP
Interior Minister	József Györe	14 November 1952	4 July 1953	MDP
Justice Minister	Erik Molnár	14 August 1952	14 November 1952	MDP
Justice Minister	Gyula Décsi	14 November 1952	2 February 1953	MDP
Justice Minister	Béla Kovács	2 February 1953	4 July 1953	MDP
Ministry of Light Industry	Árpád Kiss	14 August 1952	4 July 1953	MDP
Ministry for Posts	Antal Katona	14 August 1952	4 July 1953	MDP
Minister of Public Education	József Darvas	14 August 1952	4 July 1953	Independent
Minister of Foreign Trade	András Szobek	14 August 1952	4 July 1953	MDP
Ministry of Transport	Lajos Bebrits	14 August 1952	4 July 1953	MDP
Ministry of Health	Anna Ratkó	14 August 1952	18 April 1953	MDP
Ministry of Health	Sándor Zsoldos	18 April 1953	4 July 1953	MDP

== Sources ==
- József Bölöny : Governments of Hungary 1848–2004. The period between 1987 and 2004 was processed and published by László Hubai. 5th expanded and improved edition. Budapest: Academic Publishing House. 2004. ISBN 963-05-8106-X

Government offices
Preceded by Dobi	Cabinets of the Hungarian People's Republic; 14 August 1952–4 July 1953	Succeeded by Imre Nagy I
