= Governments of Imre Nagy =

List of the cabinets of Imre Nagy

Imre Nagy first became Chairman of the Council of Ministers of the Hungarian People's Republic (Prime Minister of Hungary) on 4 July 1953 upon the resignation of Mátyás Rákosi, forming a government more moderate than that of his predecessor which attempted to reform the system. However, Rákosi remained First Secretary of the ruling Hungarian Working People's Party, and he was ultimately able to use his influence to force Nagy out of office in April 1955.

After the outbreak of the Hungarian Revolution on 23 October 1956, Nagy was reinstated as prime minister the next day as a result of intense popular demand. As the Revolution progressed his government made moves towards a multi-party system, admitting non-Communist politicians to power and reforming the ruling Hungarian Working People's Party into the Hungarian Socialist Workers' Party. On 3 November Nagy formed a third government with a Communist minority including all the members of the post-war coalition parties: the Independent Smallholders' Party, the Social Democratic Party, and Petőfi Party.

However, the very next day the Soviet Union launched a massive military invasion of Hungary, deposing Nagy and installing a new Communist government under János Kádár. Nagy and his cabinet were granted asylum in the Yugoslav Embassy in Budapest, where they refused to resign and recognize the new regime. Kádár would not arrive in Budapest until 7 November and his government would not be confirmed until 12 November, and a standoff ensued. Nagy and his group were finally convinced to leave the Embassy on 22 November under a promise of safe conduct from Kádár, but they were promptly arrested upon leaving the building. Nagy would be executed after a show trial on the order of Kádár in June 1958, and would not be rehabilitated until the end of Communism in Hungary in 1989.

== First government (1953–1955) ==
First Cabinet of Imre Nagy
- Cabinet of Hungary
- 1953–1955
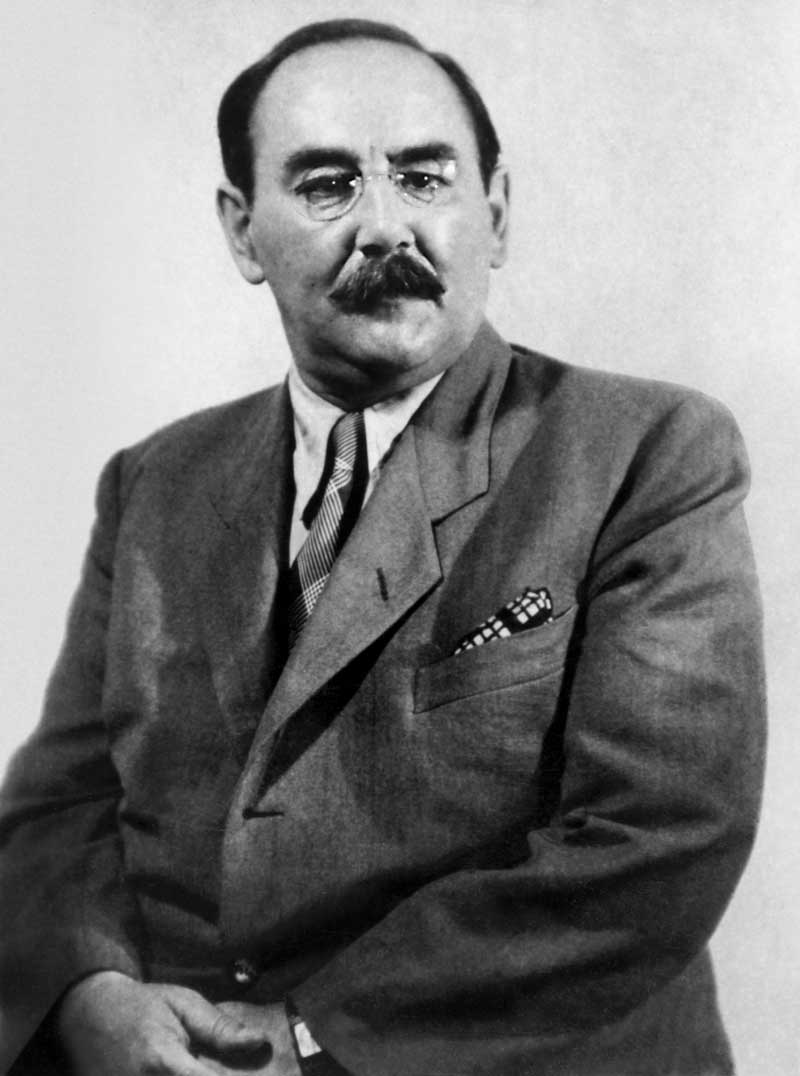
- Date formed: 4 July 1953
- Date dissolved: 18 April 1955

People and organisations
- Chairman of the Presidential Council: István Dobi
- First Secretary of the Hungarian Working People's Party: Mátyás Rákosi
- Chairman of the Council of Ministers: Imre Nagy
- Deputy Chairmen of the Council of Ministers: Ernő Gerő András Hegedüs Antal Apró (−1953) István Hidas (1954–)
- No. of ministers: 29
- Total no. of members: 37
- Member party: Hungarian Working People's Party (as part of Patriotic People's Front)
- Status in legislature: Total control 298 / 298 (100%)
- Opposition party: None (one-party state)

History
- Election: 1953
- Predecessor: Rákosi
- Successor: Hegedüs

Government of Hungary (4 July 1953 – 18 April 1955)
Position	Person	Party	Took office	Left office
Prime Minister	Imre Nagy	MDP	4 July 1953	18 April 1955
Deputy Prime Minister	Ernő Gerő	MDP	←	→
Deputy Prime Minister	András Hegedüs	MDP	4 July 1953	18 April 1955
Deputy Prime Minister	Antal Apró	MDP	4 July 1953	18 November 1953
Deputy Prime Minister	István Hidas	MDP	30 October 1954	→
Foreign Minister	János Boldóczki	MDP	4 July 1953	→
Interior Minister	Ernő Gerő	MDP	4 July 1953	6 July 1954
Interior Minister	László Piros	MDP	6 July 1954	→
Defense Minister	István Bata	MDP	4 July 1953	→
Justice Minister	Ferenc Erdei	None	4 July 1953	30 October 1954
Justice Minister	Erik Molnár	MDP	30 October 1954	→
Minister of State Farms	György Pogácsás	MDP	30 October 1954	→
Minister of Collection	József Tisza	MDP	←	6 July 1954
Minister of Collection	András Szobek	MDP	6 July 1954	→
Minister of Trade	József Bognár	None	4 July 1953	→
Minister of Health	Sándor Zsoldos	MDP	←	1 February 1955
Minister of Health	József Román	MDP	19 February 1955	→
Agriculture Minister	András Hegedüs	MDP	4 July 1953	30 October 1954
Agriculture Minister	Ferenc Erdei	None	30 October 1954	→
Finance Minister	Károly Olt	MDP	←	→
Culture Minister	József Darvas	None	4 July 1953	→
Education Minister	Tibor Erdey-Grúz	MDP	4 July 1953	→
Minister of Construction	Lajos Szijártó	MDP	←	→
Minister of Food	Iván Altomáré	MDP	←	→
Minister of Metallurgy and Machinery	Mihály Zsofinyecz	MDP	←	9 October 1954
Minister of Metallurgy and Machinery	János Csergő	MDP	9 October 1954	→
Minister of Light Industry	Árpád Kiss	MDP	←	30 October 1954
Minister of Light Industry	Béla Szalai	MDP	30 October 1954	→
Minister of Transport	Lajos Bebrits	MDP	←	→
Minister of Foreign Trade	László Háy	MDP	6 July 1954	→
Minister of Heavy Industry	István Hidas	MDP	9 October 1954	→
Minister of Coal Mining	Sándor Czottner	MDP	9 October 1954	→
Minister of Urban and Village Management	János Szabó	MDP	29 January 1954	→
Chemical and Energy Minister	István Hidas	MDP	9 October 1954	30 October 1954
Chemical and Energy Minister	Árpád Kiss	MDP	30 October 1954	→
Director of the National Planning Office	Béla Szalai	MDP	←	30 October 1954
Director of the National Planning Office	Andor Berei	MDP	30 October 1954	→

== Second government (24 October–3 November 1956) ==
Second Cabinet of Imre Nagy
- Cabinet of Hungary
- 1956
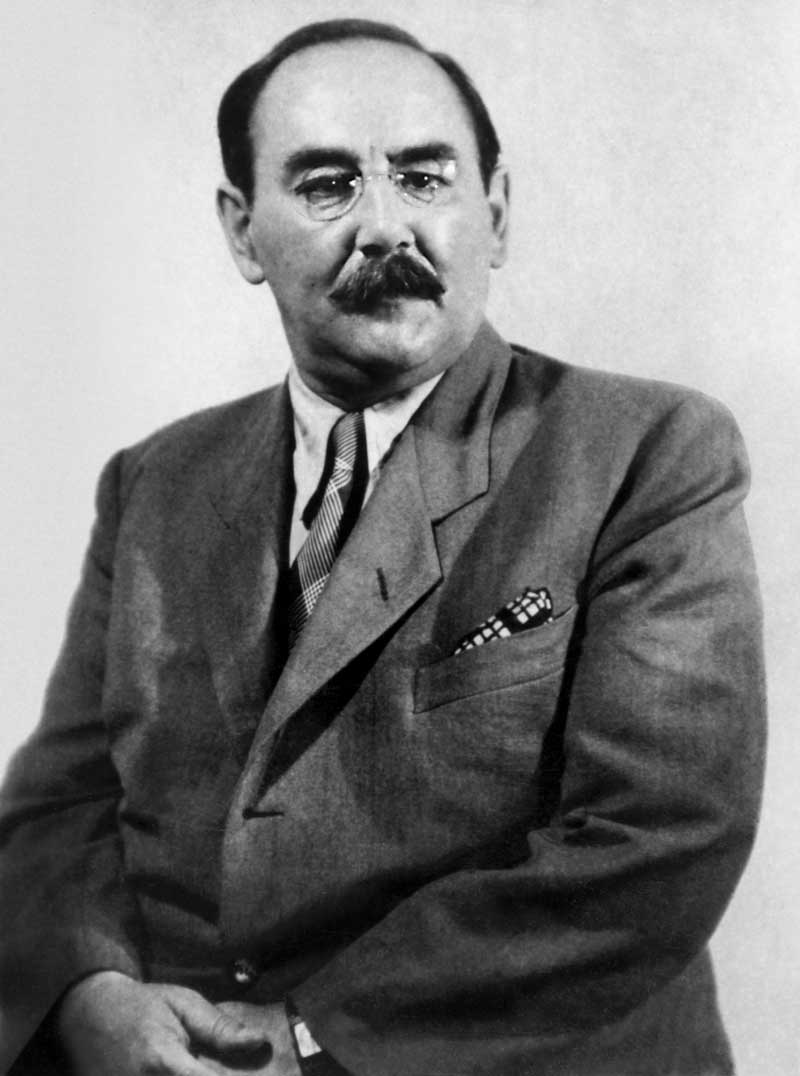
- Date formed: 24 October 1956
- Date dissolved: 3 November 1956

People and organisations
- Chairman of the Presidential Council: István Dobi
- First Secretary of the MDP/MSZMP: Ernő Gerő (−25 Oct.) János Kádár (25 Oct.–)
- Chairman of the Council of Ministers: Imre Nagy
- Deputy Chairmen of the Council of Ministers: Antal Apró; Ferenc Erdei; József Bognár (27 Oct.–); András Hegedüs (−27 Oct.); István Hidas (−27 Oct.); György Marosán (−27 Oct.); József Mekis (−27 Oct.)
- Minister of State: Zoltán Tildy Géza Losonczy János Kádár
- No. of ministers: 33
- Total no. of members: 45
- Member party: Hungarian Working People's Party from 31 October: Hungarian Socialist Workers' Party from 27 October: Independent Smallholders' Party
- Opposition party: (extraparliamentary) from 31 October: Social Democratic Party Petőfi Party numerous reconstituted parties

History
- Incoming formation: Outbreak of the Hungarian Revolution
- Outgoing formation: Government reshuffle
- Predecessor: Hegedüs
- Successor: I. Nagy III

Government of Hungary (24 October – 3 November 1956)
Position	Person	Party	Took office	Left office
Prime Minister	Imre Nagy	MDP/MSZMP	24 October 1956	3 November 1956
Deputy Prime Minister	András Hegedüs	MDP	24 October 1956	27 October 1956
Deputy Prime Minister	Antal Apró	MDP	←	3 November 1956
Deputy Prime Minister	István Hidas	MDP	←	27 October 1956
Deputy Prime Minister	Ferenc Erdei	None	←	3 November 1956
Deputy Prime Minister	György Marosán	MDP	←	27 October 1956
Deputy Prime Minister	József Mekis	MDP	←	27 October 1956
Deputy Prime Minister	József Bognár	None	27 October 1956	3 November 1956
Minister of State	Zoltán Tildy	FKGP	27 October 1956	→
Minister of State	Géza Losonczy	MDP/MSZMP	30 October 1956	→
Minister of State	János Kádár	MSZMP	30 October 1956	→
Foreign Minister	Imre Horváth	MDP/MSZMP	←	2 November 1956
Foreign Minister	Imre Nagy	MSZMP	2 November 1956	→
Interior Minister	László Piros	MDP	←	27 October 1956
Interior Minister	Ferenc Münnich	MDP/MSZMP	27 October 1956	3 November 1956
Defense Minister	István Bata	MDP	←	27 October 1956
Defense Minister	Károly Janza	MDP/MSZMP	27 October 1956	3 November 1956
Justice Minister	Erik Molnár	MDP	←	3 November 1956
Minister of State Farms	György Pogácsás	MDP	←	27 October 1956
Minister of State Farms	Miklós Ribiánszky	MDP/MSZMP	27 October 1956	3 November 1956
Minister of Collection	András Szobek	MDP/MSZMP	←	3 November 1956
Minister of Trade	József Bognár	None	←	3 November 1956
Agriculture Minister	János Matolcsi	MDP	←	27 October 1956
Agriculture Minister	Béla Kovács	FKGP	27 October 1956	→
Finance Minister	István Kossa	MDP/MSZMP	←	3 November 1956
Minister of Internal Trade	János Tausz	MDP/MSZMP	←	3 November 1956
Minister of Health	József Román	MDP/MSZMP	←	27 October 1956
Minister of Health	Antal Babics	MDP/MSZMP	27 October 1956	3 November 1956
Culture Minister	József Darvas	None	←	27 October 1956
Culture Minister	György Lukács	MDP/MSZMP	27 October 1956	3 November 1956
Education Minister	Albert Kónya	MDP	←	3 November 1956
Minister of Construction	Lajos Szijártó	MDP	←	27 October 1956
Minister of Food	Rezső Nyers	MDP/MSZMP	←	3 November 1956
Minister of Metallurgy and Machinery	János Csergő	MDP	←	3 November 1956
Minister of Light Industry	Jolán Sarka	MDP	←	3 November 1956
Minister of Transport	Lajos Bebrits	MDP	←	29 October 1956
Minister of Transport	György Csánadi	MDP/MSZMP	29 October 1956	3 November 1956
Minister of Foreign Trade	József Bognár	None	←	3 November 1956
Minister of Mines and Energy	Sándor Czottner	MDP	←	31 October 1956
Minister of Urban and Village Management	János Szabó	MDP	←	27 October 1956
Minister of Urban and Village Management	Ferenc Nezvál	MDP/MSZMP	27 October 1956	3 November 1956
Chemical and Energy Minister	Gergely Szabó	MDP/MSZMP	←	3 November 1956
Director of the National Planning Office	Andor Berei	MDP	←	27 October 1956
Director of the National Planning Office	Árpád Kiss	MDP/MSZMP	27 October 1956	3 November 1956

== Third government (3–4/12 November 1956) ==
Third Cabinet of Imre Nagy
- Cabinet of Hungary
- 1956
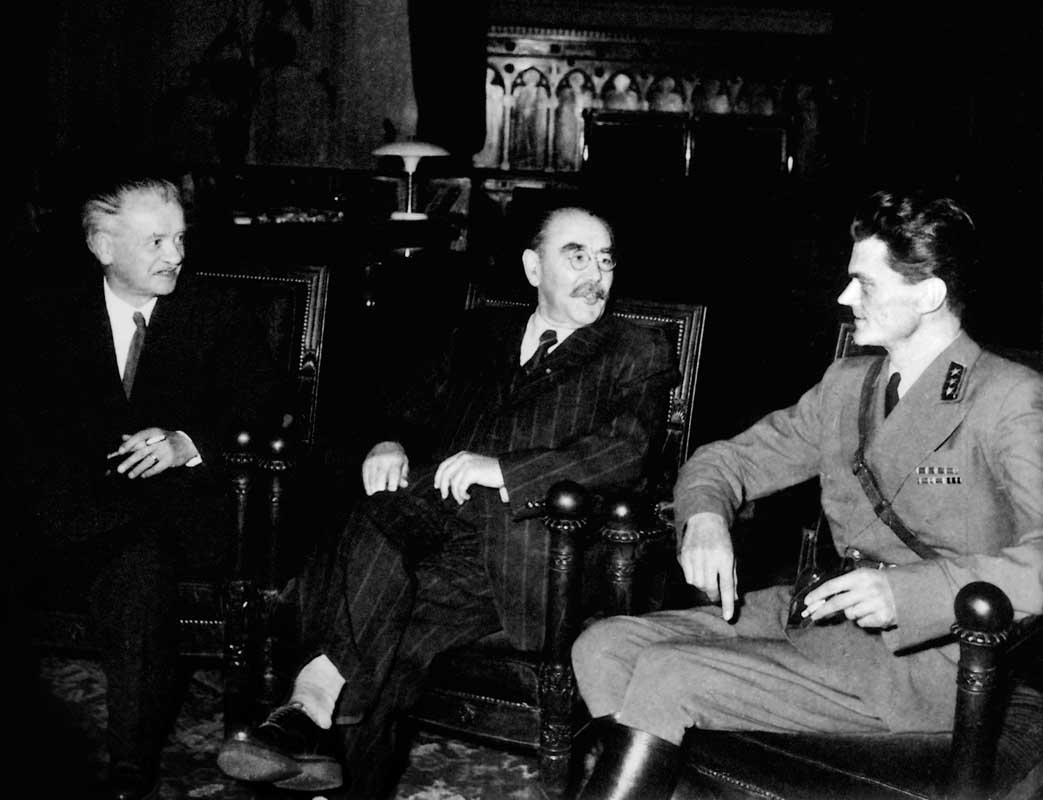
- Date formed: 3 November 1956
- Date dissolved: 4 November 1956 (de facto) 12 November 1956 (de jure) at refuge until 22 November 1956

People and organisations
- Chairman of the Presidential Council: István Dobi
- Chairman of the Council of Ministers: Imre Nagy
- No. of ministers: 12
- Member party: Hungarian Socialist Workers' Party Independent Smallholders' Party Social Democratic Party Petőfi Party
- Opposition party: Numerous reconstituted parties

History
- Incoming formation: Government reshuffle
- Outgoing formation: Soviet invasion
- Predecessor: I. Nagy II
- Successor: Kádár I

Government of Hungary (3 November 1956 – 4/12 November 1956)
Position	Person	Party
Prime Minister	Imre Nagy	MSZMP
Foreign Minister	Imre Nagy	MSZMP
Defense Minister	Pál Maléter	MSZMP
Minister of State	Zoltán Tildy	FKGP
Minister of State	Béla Kovács	FKGP
Minister of State	István B. Szabó	FKGP
Minister of State	Anna Kéthly	MSZDP
Minister of State	Gyula Kelemen	MSZDP
Minister of State	József Fischer	MSZDP
Minister of State	István Bibó	PP
Minister of State	Ferenc Farkas	PP
Minister of State	Géza Losonczy	MSZMP
Minister of State	János Kádár	MSZMP
