= Hegedüs government =

Hungarian government

Hegedüs cabinet
- 51st Cabinet of Hungary

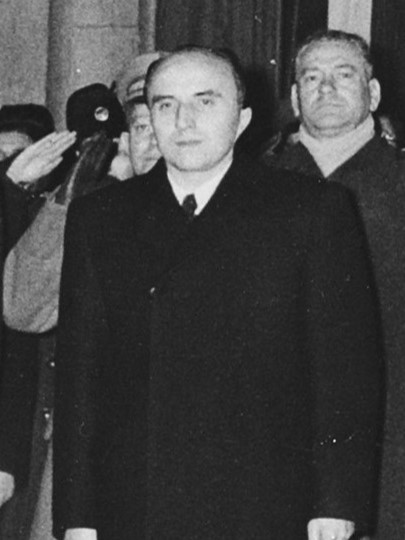
- Chairman of the Council of Ministers of the Hungarian People's Republic András Hegedüs
- Date formed: 18 April 1955
- Date dissolved: 24 October 1956

People and organisations
- Chairman of the Presidential Council: István Dobi
- First Secretary of the Hungarian Working People's Party: Mátyás Rákosi (April 18th, 1955 – July 18, 1956); Ernő Gerő (from July 18, 1956)
- Chairman of the Council of Ministers: András Hegedüs
- Deputy Chairmen of the Council of Ministers: Ernő Gerő István Hidas Antal Apro Ferenc Erdei György Marosan Joseph Mekis
- No. of ministers: 28
- Member party: Hungarian Working People's Party (as part of Patriotic People's Front)
- Status in legislature: Total control 298 / 298 (100%)

History
- Election: 1953
- Predecessor: I. Nagy I
- Successor: I. Nagy II

The Hegedüs government led Hungary for eighteen months, spanning from April 18, 1955 to October 24, 1956. It officially operated as the Council of Ministers of the Hungarian People's Republic and was helmed by András Hegedüs, who served as the Chairman of the Council of Ministers.

== Background ==
In the aftermath of World War II, the country embarked on the construction of a socialist foundation based on the Stalinist model. The challenges of rebuilding the economy and industrializing in the face of limited resources were compounded by internal disputes within the ruling Hungarian Working People's Party, particularly regarding political and economic strategies.

Matyas Rakosi, General Secretary of the Central Committee of the Hungarian Working People's Party, pursued orthodox Stalinist policies, emulating those implemented in the USSR. By the end of 1949, extensive nationalization had taken place, bringing key sectors under state control. The accelerated collectivization of agriculture commenced, with 1,500 production cooperatives established by the middle of the year. Rakosi, faced with international tensions and the outbreak of the Korean War, believed in expediting the establishment of socialism, even resorting to reprisals.

A counterposition emerged, led by Imre Nagy, a former Minister of Agriculture (Hungary) known for overseeing agrarian reform. Nagy criticized Rakosi's approach, advocating for socialist reform. The death of Joseph Stalin in 1953 weakened Rakosi's position, as new Soviet leaders favored moderate reforms and a departure from Stalinism. In July 1956, Imre Nagy replaced Rakosi as the head of the government, steering away from forced industrialization and promoting democratization.

However, Nagy's tenure faced opposition, leading to his condemnation by the Central Committee in March 1955. Despite this, Nagy retained support, especially among intellectuals, youth, and certain press organs. Unable to reinstate himself or appoint loyal comrades to key positions, Rakosi supported the candidacy of András Hegedüs, a 33-year-old ally, as the head of the Council of Ministers.

Hegedüs, aligned with Rakosi's policies, collaborated with the Rákosi group in sidelining Nagy's supporters and implemented a Five-Year Plan. The government signed the Warsaw Pact on May 14, 1955. During the Hungarian Revolution of 1956, Hegedüs initially supported Ernő Gerő, but later, as the situation evolved, left his post along with most of his cabinet members.

== Composition ==
Portfolio	Minister	Party
Chairman of the Council of Ministers	András Hegedüs	MDP
First Deputy Chairman of the Council of Ministers	Ernő Gerő (until July 30, 1956); István Hidas (from July 30, 1956)	MDP
Deputy Chairman of the Council of Ministers	Antal Apro	MDP
Deputy Chairman of the Council of Ministers	Ferenc Erdei (until November 15, 1955); István Hidas (until July 30, 1956); György Marosan	MDP
Deputy Chairman of the Council of Ministers	Joseph Mekis	MDP
Minister of State Control	Árpád Házi	MDP
Minister of Economy	György Pogácsás	MDP
Minister of Mines and Energy	Sándor Czottner	MDP
Minister of Taxes and Duties	András Szobek	MDP
Interior Minister	Laszlo Piros	MDP
Minister of Domestic Trade	József Bognár (until April 14, 1956); Janos Tausz (from April 14, 1956)	MDP
Minister of Health	Joseph Roman	MDP
Minister of Food	Iván Altomáré (until July 30, 1956); Rezső Nyers (from July 30, 1956)	MDP
Minister of Construction	Lajos Szíjártó	MDP
Minister of Agriculture	Ferenc Erdei (until November 15, 1955); Janos Matolcsy (from November 15, 1955)	MDP
Minister of Defense	István Bata	MDP
Justice Minister	Erik Molnár	MDP
Minister of Metallurgy and Mechanical Engineering	Janos Csergő	MDP
Minister of Light Industry	Béla Szalai (until September 8, 1955); Józsefné Nagy (from September 8, 1955)	MDP
Minister of Transport and Postal Service	Lajos Bebrits	MDP
Minister of Foreign Trade	László Háy (until April 14, 1956); József Bognár (from April 14, 1956)	MDP
Foreign Minister	Janos Boldocki (until July 30, 1956); Imre Horváth (from July 30, 1956)	MDP
Minister of Culture	József Darvas	MDP
Minister of Public Education	Tibor Erdey-Grúz (d 30 July 1956); Albert Kónya (d 30 July 1956)	MDP
Minister of Finance	Karoly Olt	MDP
Minister of Coal Industry	Sandor Czottner	MDP
Minister of City and Municipal Administration	Janos Shabo	MDP
Minister of Chemical and Energy Industry	Árpád Kiss	MDP
Minister of Chemical Industry	Gergely Szabó	MDP
Chairman of the National Planning Committee	Andor Berei	MDP

== Literature ==
- T. M. Islamov, A. I. s, V. P. Shusharin. (1991). Brief history of Hungary. From ancient times to the present day (PDF). M.: Nauka. p. 608. ISBN 5-02-009913-9.
- S. Y. Lavrenov, I. M. Popov. (2003). Soviet Union in local wars and conflicts. M.: LLC "ACT Publishing House". p. 778. ISBN 5-271-05709-7.

== Sources ==
- József Bölöny : Governments of Hungary 1848–2004. The period between 1987 and 2004 was processed and published by László Hubai. 5th expanded and improved edition. Budapest: Academic Publishing House. 2004. ISBN 963-05-8106-X
- Islamov, Т. М.; Pushkash, А. I.; Shusharin, V. P. (1991). Краткая история Венгрии. С древнейших времен до наших дней [A Brief History of Hungary. From ancient times to the present day] (PDF) (in Russian). Moscow: Nauka. ISBN 5-02-009913-9.

Government offices
Preceded by Nagi I	Cabinets of the Hungarian People's Republic; April 18, 1955 – October 24, 1956	Succeeded by Nagy II
