= Rudolf Földvári =

Hungarian politician (1921–2024)

Member of the National Assembly
- In office 17 May 1953 – 9 May 1957

Personal details
- Born: 20 May 1921 Kispest, Hungary (today a borough of Budapest)
- Died: 20 April 2024 (aged 102) Budapest, Hungary
- Party: MKP (1945–1948); MDP (1948–1956); MSZMP (1956–1957)

Rudolf Földvári (born Frank; 20 May 1921 – 20 April 2024) was a Hungarian communist politician and revolutionary. He was a Member of Parliament from 1953 to 1957. Because of his participation in the Hungarian Revolution of 1956, he was arrested and imprisoned.

== Early life ==
Földvári was born into a labour family in Kispest (today a borough of Budapest) on 20 May 1921, as the son of carpenter Rudolf Frank and iron factory worker Margit Molnár. He spent a few years, from 1925 to 1927, in Turkey as a child, where his carpenter father got a job. Returning Hungary, Földvári completed four-grade primary school in 1935, then he studied as a locksmith at the Hofherr-Schrantz-Clayton-Shuttleworth Machine Factory Works (HSCS), having obtained a technical certificate there in 1940. He worked as a locksmith and assistant foreman from 1940. He was a member of the trade union of iron and metal workers. During the World War II, he was drafted and fought in Eastern Front since 1942. He served as a photographer in the Hungarian Air Force. He was captured by the Soviets in December 1944. After his release from POW camp, He returned to Hungary in the autumn of 1945.

== Party career ==
Földvári joined the Kispest branch of the Hungarian Communist Party (MKP) in September 1945. He became a propagandist of the local branch by the next year. He was appointed head of the propaganda department of the National Council of Trade Unions (SZOT) in 1948. He introduced Élmunkás badge and organized the first Stakhanovite competitions in Hungary among factory workers in 1949. He finished the party's college in 1951. He changed his name from Frank to Földvári in the same year. Thereafter, he became deputy head of the Cadre Department of the Central Leadership (KV) of the ruling Hungarian Working People's Party (MDP). He served as first secretary of the party's Budapest Central Committee between 1952 and 1954. Simultaneously, he was a member of the Council of Budapest and the party's Central Leadership and Political Committee (PB) from June 1953. He was a Member of Parliament from 1953 to 1957.

Földvári took part in the funeral of Stalin in March 1953, alongside party leader Mátyás Rákosi and Árpád Házi. He was a member of that seven-member Hungarian delegation which was ordered to Moscow for consultation in June 1953. There, the new Soviet leadership under Nikita Khrushchev dressed down Rákosi for Hungary's lackluster economic performance. Following that, Földvári belonged to the internal opposition of Rákosi's power and was a supporter of the reform efforts of the new premier Imre Nagy. Under his leadership, the Budapest Central Committee voted against Rákosi's program draft before the 3rd Congress of MDP in May 1954. Therefore, Földvári was excluded from the party's newly formed Political Committee and transferred to the countryside. He functioned as first secretary of the party's Borsod–Abaúj–Zemplén County branch from 1954 to 1956. The future general secretary of the party Károly Grósz was one of his closest colleagues.

== Revolution and aftermath ==
Days before the Hungarian Revolution of 1956, Földvári wrote to the PB on behalf of the county party committee on 16 October 1956, in which he urged personnel changes and the convening of an extraordinary party congress demanded, the critical statement was also published in the newspaper Északmagyarország on the day of the revolution broke out on 23 October. During the revolution, Földvári joined the establishing workers' council in the Diósgyőr State Iron, Steel and Machine Works (DIMÁVAG) in Miskolc, as the only county first secretary to do so in the entire country. He was also a member of the county's workers' council during the revolution. In this capacity, he led delegation of workers to the Imre Nagy government on 25–27 October and 1–2 November 1956. Following the Soviet invasion of Hungary, he was arrested and interned to Uzhhorod in the Soviet Union on 5 November 1956. He was freed on 17 November. Following that, he functioned as president of the workers' council of Borsod–Abaúj–Zemplén County until mid-December, then as first secretary of local county branch of the newly emerging Hungarian Socialist Workers' Party (MSZMP) until March 1957, when he was excluded from the party. Földvári was employed as a locksmith at the Vörös Csillag Tractor Factory in Kispest, retiring from politics. He was arrested in May 1957, his parliamentary mandate was then officially terminated. For his political role in the 1956 revolution, Földvári was sentenced for life imprisonment without the possibility of parole by the People's Court Council of the Supreme Court on 18 July 1958.

Földvári was granted amnesty in 1961. Thereafter, he worked as a locksmith then shift manager at the Vörös Csillag Tractor Factory. He translated several technical books. He retired in 1981. Following the end of communism in Hungary, his sentence was overturned and he was rehabilitated in 1990. He was a board member of the Imre Nagy Society from 1992 to 1997. He was awarded the title of honorary citizen of Miskolc in 2010. Földvári died on 20 April 2024, at the age of 102.
