= Anna Kéthly =

Hungarian politician (1889–1976)

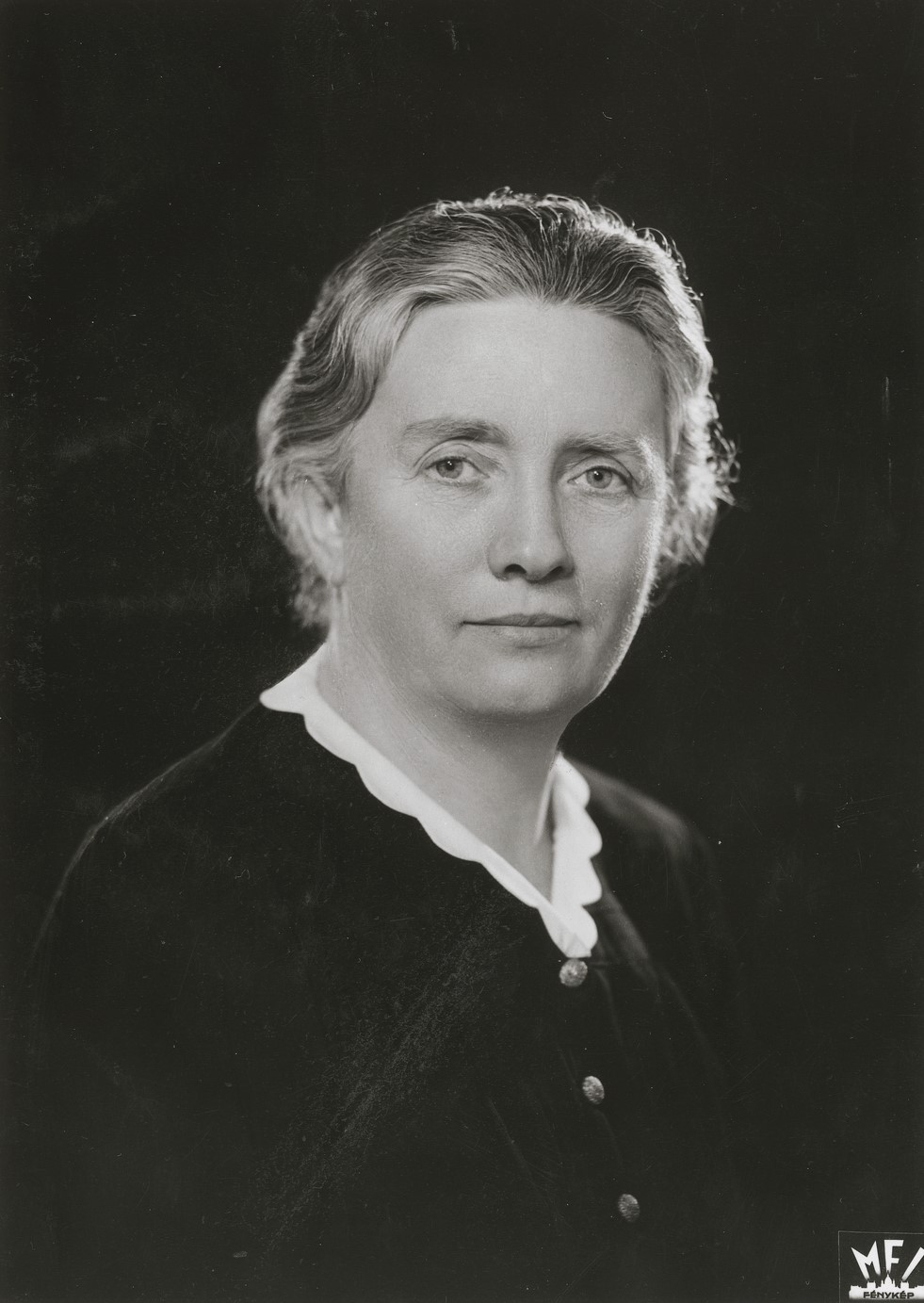
- Official portrait, 1941
- Minister of State of Hungary
- In office 3 November 1956 – 12 November 1956
- Prime Minister: Imre Nagy
- Succeeded by: György Marosán
- Serving with: See list: Zoltán Tildy Béla Kovács István B. Szabó Gyula Kelemen József Fischer István Bibó Ferenc Farkas Géza Losonczy János Kádár

Leader of the Social Democratic Party of Hungary
- In office 31 October 1956 – November 1956
- Preceded by: Árpád Szakasits
- Succeeded by: Party disbanded

Personal details
- Born: 16 November 1889 Budapest, Kingdom of Hungary, Austria-Hungary
- Died: 7 September 1976 (aged 86) Blankenberge, Belgium
- Party: SZDP
- Profession: politician

Anna Kéthly (16 November 1889 – 7 September 1976) was a Hungarian social democratic politician, second female member of the National Assembly of Hungary from 1922 to 1948. Her fellow party member Vilmos Böhm called her the "Joan of Arc of Hungarian politics".

During the Hungarian Revolution of 1956, she served as Minister of State in the third cabinet of Imre Nagy. Following the Soviet attack and the arrest of the cabinet members on 4 November, the final official proclamation of the Hungarian National Government vested her with the status of Hungary’s sole authorised representative abroad and the most senior member of its diplomatic corps. As she was on an official mission to the United Nations at the time of the attack, she became de jure the only remaining lawful representative of the legitimate Hungarian government until 22 November.

== Early career ==
She was one of nine children born into a poor family in Budapest, Hungary. At the age of fifteen she started working in a garment factory but soon found more appealing work in the editorial office of a women's magazine and this gave her the chance to further her education. In 1917, she joined the Hungarian Social Democratic Party and became an active Party member. In 1919, Kéthly was elected onto a committee of the Party. In subsequent years she was a frequent contributor to the Party's newspaper Népszava. In 1922 Kéthly was elected to Parliament as a member of the Social Democratic Party, and represented her Party in parliament without a break until the German invasion of Hungary in March 1944. After the German invasion, Kéthly left Budapest and lived in the country with false papers under an assumed identity.

After the Second World War, Kéthly again became politically active and helped to reorganize the Hungarian Social Democratic Party and she was elected to the Party's Political Committee. In April 1945, she was elected a member of the Provisional National Assembly and in the general elections in November of same year, she was re-elected to parliament, this time as head of the Social Democratic faction, and was made Deputy Speaker of Parliament. Kéthly made frequent contributions of articles to Socialist papers and was active in maintaining contact with international socialist Parties in the West. In post-war Hungary, she was a leading opponent of her Party's merger with the Hungarian Communist Party and in the internal power-struggle that ensued, in March 1948, she was dismissed from the Party and soon after she also lost her seat in Parliament and placed under house arrest for two years.

== Arrest ==
In June 1950, Kéthly, together with several other members of the Social Democratic Party, was arrested by the Communists, who had in the meantime gained control of Hungary. In January 1954, after more than three years in prison, she was charged with spying and activities directed against the state and sentenced to life imprisonment. Following international pressure from Western socialist parties she was granted a pardon and released, but kept under permanent 'observation'.

== Role in the Hungarian Revolution of 1956 and life in exile ==
On 31 October 1956, following the revival of the Hungarian Social Democratic Party during the Revolution, she became president of the Party. On 1 November she attended the Socialist International meeting in Vienna, Austria. The following day, 2 November The Hungarian Government appointed her a delegate to the United Nations General Assembly. On 3 November her Party nominated Kéthly for a ministerial position in the new coalition government of Imre Nagy but at dawn the following day, 4 November 1956, the Soviet Union invaded Hungary and she was advised to fly to New York City and appeal to the U.N. General Assembly on behalf of Hungary. Eventually she settled in London, United Kingdom, where she carried on writing and editing Socialist publications. In 1962 the Hungarian Supreme Court reviewed Kéthly's 1954 pardon and, in absentia, imposed on her a three-year prison sentence for anti-state activities.

Anna Kéthly died on 7 September 1976, in Blankenberge, Belgium.

In October, 1990, her ashes were returned to Hungary and laid to rest. She was fully rehabilitated on 7 July 1994, when the Hungarian Supreme Court annulled the 1962 verdict against her.

== Movie ==
A movie about her life, Utolsó jelentés Annáról ("Last Report About Anna") premiered in late 2009. It was directed by Márta Mészáros. Enikő Eszenyi plays Kéthly.
