= Lajos Szíjártó =

Lajos Szíjártó (January 11, 1896 – September 3, 1966) was a Kossuth Prize-winning Hungarian architect, diplomat, and government minister.

== Biography ==
Szíjártó was born in 1896 to a working-class family in Szekszárd.

From 1914, Szíjártó was a factory calculator at the Ganz Wagon Factory, and in 1915 he became a member of the trade union associated with the Social Democratic Party of Hungary. In November 24, 1918, he was one of the founding members of the Hungarian Communist Party. During the Hungarian Soviet Republic, he served as a commander in the Red Army, took part in the capture of Losonc, and then became the commander of the Nógrád county border guard regiment. He was a member of the Council of Five Hundred. After the fall of the Soviet Republic, he was sentenced to 12 years in prison, but in September 1922 he was sent to the Soviet Union as a result of a prisoner exchange.

Szíjártó completed the six-month party school and then obtained an architectural engineering diploma. He worked on large-scale industrial constructions and then became the construction director of the Ministry of Electrical Works. After the Second World War, Szíjártó returned home in May 1948, and served as a consultant to the Construction Directorate in Hungary, then the general manager of the Factory Construction Industry Center, and helped to organize the Ministry of Construction. From May to June 1949, he was a department head and then a group leader at the Ministry of Construction and Public Works. In May 1950, he became the State Secretary for Construction, and in January 1951, he became the first deputy of the Minister of Construction László Sándor. In 1951, he was awarded the Kossuth Prize.

On October 6, 1951, Szíjártó was appointed Minister of Construction in the Dobi government. He held his position in the Rákosi Government, the first Imre Nagy government, the Hegedüs government and the second Imre Nagy government, until October 27, 1956.

After the Hungarian Revolution of 1956, Szíjártó entered the diplomatic field, and served as ambassador of Hungary to Sudan, Ethiopia and Yemen in Cairo from October 1957 to December 1963. He died in 1966 in Budapest.

== Awards ==
- Order of Merit of the Hungarian People's Republic, 4th degree (1950)
- Order of Merit of the Hungarian People's Republic, 3rd degree (1950)
- Order of Merit of the Red Banner of Labor (1954)
- Order of Merit of the Red Banner of Labor (1956)
