= Béla Kovács (politician, 1908) =

Hungarian politician (1908–1959)

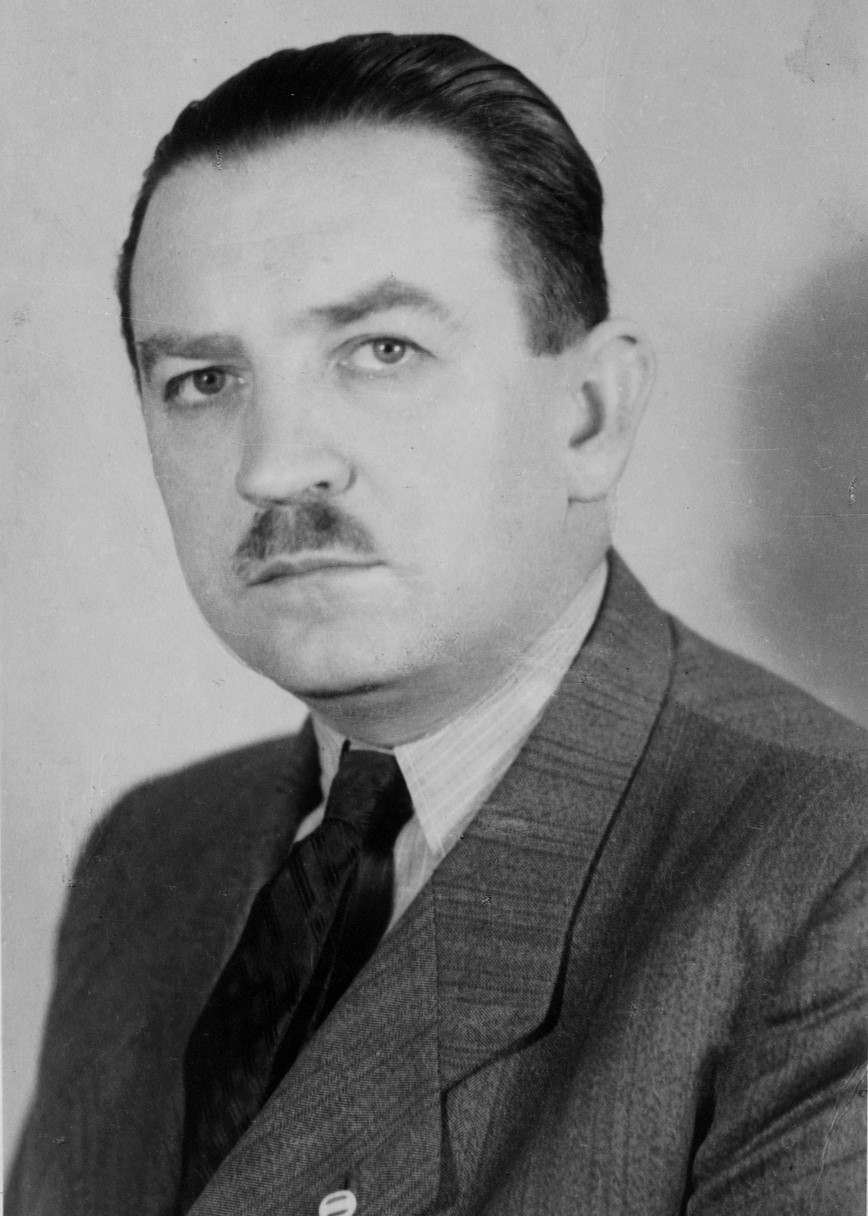

Minister of Agriculture of Hungary
- In office 15 November 1945 – 23 February 1946
- Prime Minister: Zoltán Tildy Ferenc Nagy
- Preceded by: Imre Nagy
- Succeeded by: István Dobi
- In office 24 October 1956 – 3 November 1956
- Prime Minister: Imre Nagy
- Preceded by: János Matolcsi
- Succeeded by: Imre Dögei

Personal details
- Born: 20 April 1908 Patacs (now part of Pécs), Kingdom of Hungary, Austria-Hungary
- Died: 21 June 1959 (aged 51) Pécs, People's Republic of Hungary
- Party: FKGP
- Profession: politician

Béla Kovács (20 April 1908 – 21 June 1959) was a Hungarian politician, who served as Minister of Agriculture from 1945 to 1946 and in the Hungarian Revolution of 1956.

== Biography ==
Béla Kovács was born in Hungary in 1908. He became involved in politics and joined the Smallholders Party (FKGP). It drew most of its support from the peasants who formed more than 50 percent of the country. However, until 1939, the ballot had been open in rural constituencies, and therefore large landowners were able to force most peasants to vote for the government party. The leaders of the Smallholders Party were mainly members of the middle class and their political views varied from liberals to socialists.

The Soviet Army invaded Hungary in September 1944. It set up an alternative government in Debrecen on 21 December 1944 but did not capture Budapest until 18 January 1945. Soon afterwards Zoltán Tildy (FKGP member) became the provisional prime minister.

In elections held in November 1945, the Smallholders Party won 57% of the vote. The Hungarian Workers Party, now under the leadership of Mátyás Rákosi and Ernő Gerő, received support from only 17% of the population. The Soviet commander in Hungary, Marshal Kliment Voroshilov, refused to allow the Smallholders to form a government. Instead Voroshilov established a coalition government with the communists holding all the key posts. Kovács became minister of agriculture (1945–46).

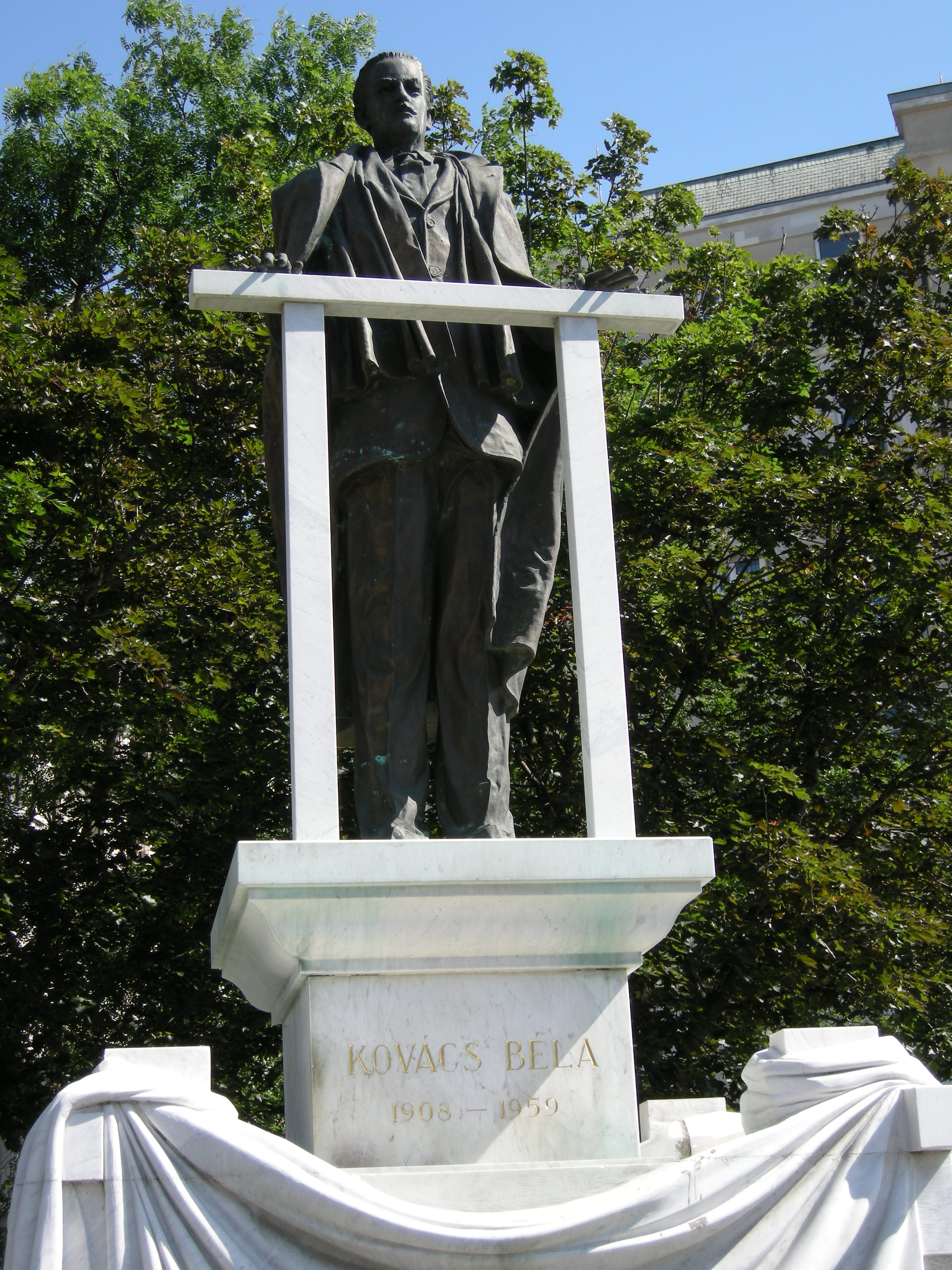
Statue of Béla Kovács in Budapest

The Hungarian Communist Party became the largest single party in the elections in 1947 and served in the coalition People's Independence Front government. The communists gradually gained control of the government and by 1948 the Smallholders Party ceased to exist as an independent organization. On February 25, 1947, Soviet authorities arrested Kovács on charges of organizing “underground anti-Soviet groups” and deported him to the Soviet Union, where he was sentenced to 20 years in prison.

Kovács was released from prison in 1956. The Hungarian Uprising began on 23 October by a peaceful demonstration of students in Budapest. On 3 November, Nagy announced details of his coalition government (third Imre Nagy cabinet). It included Kovács, György Lukács, Anna Kéthly, Zoltán Tildy, Ferenc Farkas, Géza Losonczy, István B. Szabó, Gyula Kelemen, József Fischer, Pál Maléter, Zoltán Szántó and István Bibó. On 4 November 1956 Nikita Khrushchev sent the Red Army into Hungary and Nagy's government was overthrown.

Béla Kovács, who remained a member of parliament, died in 1959.

Political offices
| Preceded by Imre Nagy | Minister of Agriculture; 1945–1946 | Succeeded by István Dobi |
| Preceded by János Matolcsi | Minister of Agriculture; 1956 | Succeeded by Imre Dögei |
