= Revolutionary Workers'-Peasants' Government of Hungary =

Government of Hungary in 1919

The Revolutionary Workers'-Peasants' Government of Hungary (Hungarian: magyar Forradalmi Munkás-Paraszt Kormány), or the First Kádár government (első Kádár-kormány), was formed during the Hungarian Revolution of 1956 with Soviet support with the aim of replacing the Imre Nagy government.

On November 2, János Kádár, who had by that time severed relations with the Nagy government, officially "somewhere in eastern Hungary" but probably in the Carpatho-Ukrainian town of Uzhhorod, began to organize "a new revolutionary center" to overthrow the Nagy government with Soviet help. On November 4, at 04.05 hours on Radio Szolnok Ferenc Münnich announced the establishment of the "Revolutionary Workers'-Peasants' Government of Hungary". Shortly after 05.00 hours János Kádár announced on Radio Szolnok the composition of the new "Revolutionary Workers'-Peasants' Government" under his prime ministership, outlined its program, and called for support. On 4 November, Kádár's government appealed to the Soviet Union to help suppress the "counter-revolutionaries". Kádár reached Budapest on 7 November with a Soviet military convoy.

== Sources ==
- https://web.archive.org/web/20090905091553/http://www.osaarchivum.org/files/holdings/300/8/3/text/36-6-112.shtml
- http://osaarchivum.org/files/holdings/300/8/3/text_da/29-1-110.shtml
