= Matolcsi =

Matolcsi is a Hungarian surname. Notable people with this surname include:

- János Matolcsi (1923–1983), Hungarian politician
- Marcell Matolcsi (born 1991), Hungarian footballer
