= Lajos Drahos =

Hungarian politician (1895–1983)

Speaker of the National Assembly of Hungary
- In office 23 August 1949 – 18 May 1951
- Preceded by: Károly Olt
- Succeeded by: Imre Dögei

Personal details
- Born: 7 March 1895 Budafok, Pest-Pilis-Solt-Kiskun County, Kingdom of Hungary
- Died: 2 June 1983 (aged 88) Budapest, Hungarian People's Republic
- Party: SZDP, MDP, MSZMP
- Profession: politician

Lajos Drahos (7 March 1895 – 2 June 1983) was a Hungarian Communist politician, who served as Speaker of the National Assembly of Hungary between 1949 and 1951. He was the ambassador to Poland from May 1951 to his retirement (1955). He was unsuitable for his position, because he did not speak any foreign languages, and was unprepared and inexperienced in diplomacy. A single viewpoint controlled the Communist decision makers at the time of their selection: reliability.

Political offices
Preceded by Károly Olt	Speaker of the National Assembly; 1949–1951	Succeeded by Imre Dögei
