= Erzsébet Nagy =

Hungarian writer and translator

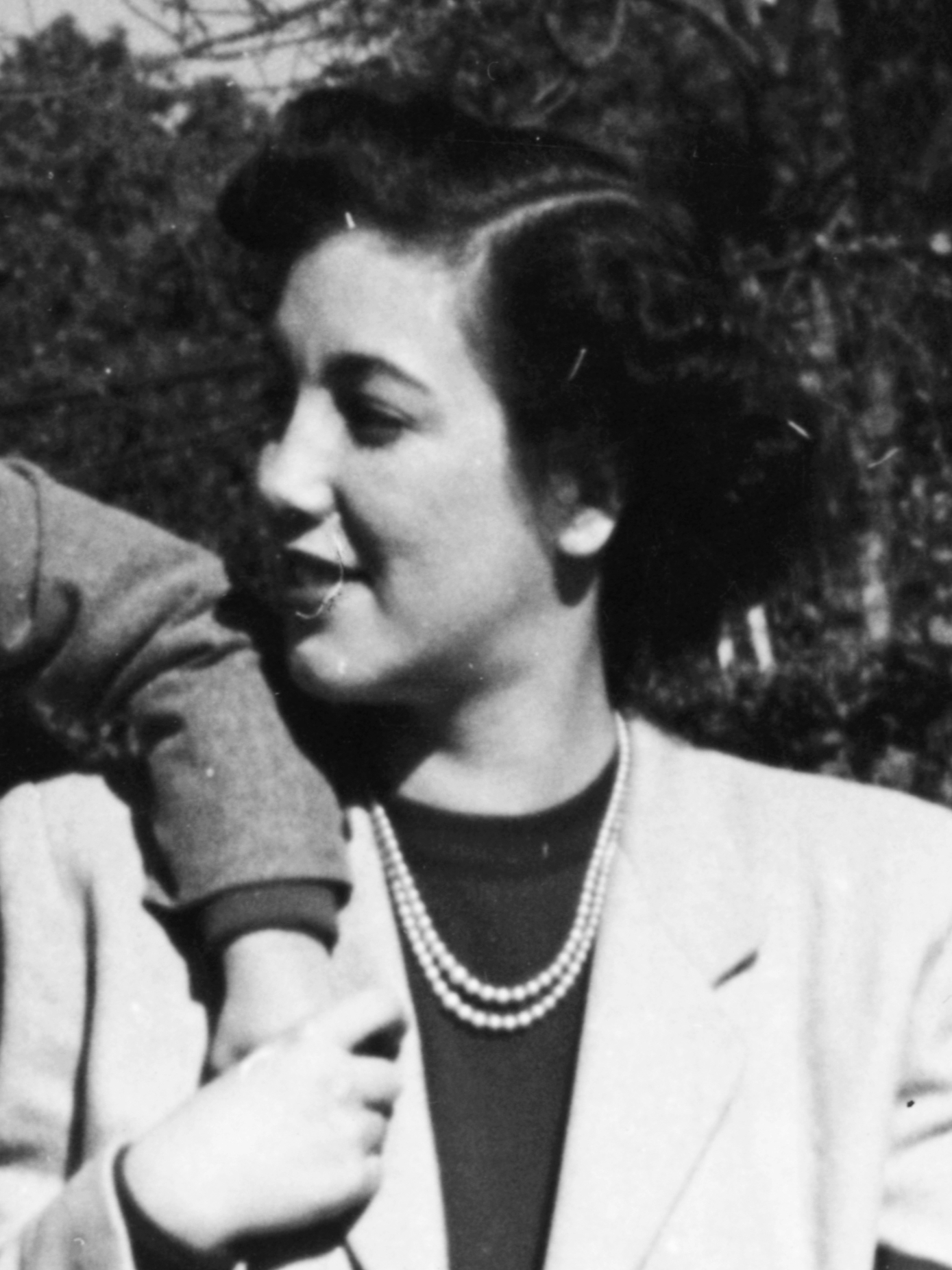
Erzsébet Nagy in 1950

Erzsébet Nagy (13 April 1927 – 29 January 2008) was a Hungarian writer and translator, and the only child of the former Prime Minister of Hungary, Imre Nagy, who was executed following the failed Hungarian Revolution of 1956.

== Biography ==
Erzsébet Nagy was born in the southern Hungarian city of Kaposvár on 13 April 1927. She was the only child of Imre Nagy and his wife, Mária Égető.

Erzsébet Nagy married Ferenc Jánosi. Imre Nagy did not object to his daughter's romance and eventual marriage to a Protestant minister, attending their religious wedding ceremony in 1946 without Politburo permission. In 1982, Erzsébet Nagy married János Vészi.

Nagy's father, Prime Minister Imre Nagy, was leading figure in the Hungarian Revolution of 1956, which was crushed by troops from the Soviet Union. Erzsébet Nagy, along with her parents, her husband, Ferenc Jánosi, and her children were all deported to Romania from Hungary following the failure of the Revolution. Other major supporters of the uprising were also deported.

Imre Nagy was returned to Hungary, as Romania was also part of the Soviet-controlled Warsaw Pact. He was found guilty of treason and executed by the Hungarian Communist government. Erzsébet Nagy did not return to her native Hungary until after her father's trial and execution. Nagy, a writer and translator by profession, was forced to work from her home for 15 years, as she was placed under a virtual house arrest by the Hungarian Communist government.

During the 1980s, Nagy became one of the co-founders of the Historical Justice Committee, which sought to exonerate those who were vilified and implicated in the 1956 Hungarian Revolution by the Communists authorities. Nagy actively participated in the memorial commemorations for those killed in the uprising following the Fall of Communism in 1989. She was noted for sometimes commemorating the 1956 Revolution with former Hungarian Communist officials who had supported the Soviet Union during the uprising. Nagy's efforts were considered controversial by anti-Communists, but were also interpreted as an attempt to heal deep political divisions that existed from the Communist era.

Nagy died on 29 January 2008, in Budapest, Hungary from an undisclosed illness. She was survived by her son and daughter.
