= Imre Dögei =

Hungarian politician (1912–1964)

Minister of Agriculture of Hungary
- In office 4 November 1956 – 15 January 1960
- Prime Minister: János Kádár; Ferenc Münnich
- Preceded by: Béla Kovács
- Succeeded by: Pál Losonczi

Personal details
- Born: 23 June 1912 Törökszentmiklós, Kingdom of Hungary, Austria-Hungary
- Died: 16 January 1964 (aged 51) Budapest, People's Republic of Hungary
- Party: MKP, MDP, MSZMP
- Profession: politician

Imre Dögei (23 June 1912 – 16 January 1964) was a Hungarian Communist politician, who served as Speaker of the National Assembly of Hungary between 1951 and 1952 and as Minister of Agriculture from 1956 to 1960.

He joined to the Hungarian Communist Party (MKP) in 1944.

Political offices
Preceded by Lajos Drahos	Speaker of the National Assembly; 1951–1952	Succeeded by Sándor Rónai
Preceded by Béla Kovács	Minister of Agriculture; 1956–1960	Succeeded by Pál Losonczi
