= Béla Kovács (communist) =

Hungarian politician and jurist (1910–1980)

Minister of Justice of Hungary
- In office 2 February 1953 – 4 July 1954
- Preceded by: Gyula Décsi
- Succeeded by: Ferenc Erdei

Personal details
- Born: 12 May 1910; Mátranovák, Austria-Hungary
- Died: 14 June 1980 (aged 70); Budapest, People's Republic of Hungary
- Political party: MDP
- Profession: politician, jurist

Béla Kovács (12 May 1910 - 14 June 1980) was a Hungarian politician and jurist, who served as Minister of Justice between 1953 and 1954. He was a judge of the Supreme Court.

Political offices
Preceded by Gyula Décsi	Minister of Justice; 1953–1954	Succeeded by Ferenc Erdei
