= Gyula Décsi =

Hungarian politician and jurist

Minister of Justice of Hungary
- In office 14 November 1952 – 8 February 1953
- Preceded by: Erik Molnár
- Succeeded by: Béla Kovács

Personal details
- Born: 28 January 1919; Szentgotthárd, Hungary
- Died: 18 September 1990 (aged 71); Budapest, Hungary
- Political party: MDP
- Profession: politician, jurist

Gyula Décsi (28 January 1919 - 18 September 1990) was a Hungarian politician and jurist, who served as Minister of Justice between 1952 and 1953 in the cabinet of Mátyás Rákosi.

Political offices
Preceded by Erik Molnár	Minister of Justice; 1952–1953	Succeeded by Béla Kovács
