= Anna Ratkó =

Hungarian politician (1903–1981)

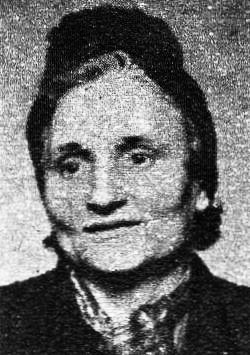

Anna Ratkó (19 August 1903 – 20 July 1981) was a Hungarian politician and Communist official. She was the Cabinet Minister of Health in 1950–1953 under the Soviet-sponsored Rákosi government. She was the first female cabinet minister in Hungary. She led an active pro-natalist policy meant to increase the country's population.
