= János Matolcsi =

Hungarian politician (1923–1983)

Minister of Agriculture of Hungary
- In office 15 November 1955 – 24 October 1956
- Preceded by: Ferenc Erdei
- Succeeded by: Béla Kovács

Personal details
- Born: 20 November 1923 Berettyóújfalu, Kingdom of Hungary
- Died: 3 January 1983 (aged 59) Budapest, People's Republic of Hungary
- Party: MDP
- Profession: politician

János Matolcsi (20 November 1923 – 3 January 1983) was a Hungarian Communist politician, who served as Minister of Agriculture from 1955 until the Hungarian Revolution of 1956. After the uprising he was the general director of the Hungarian Agricultural Museum (1957–1968).

Political offices
Preceded by Ferenc Erdei	Minister of Agriculture; 1955–1956	Succeeded by Béla Kovács
