= Béla Szalai =

Hungarian politician, minister (1926–2008)

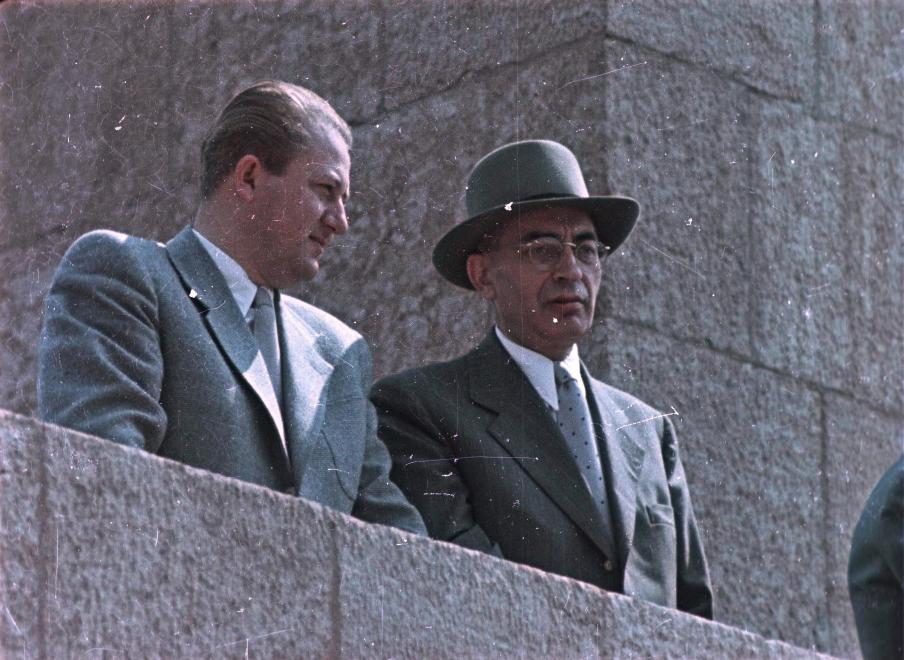
- Béla Szalai standing next to Ernő Gerő, 1955

President of the National Planning Office
- In office 1954–1956
- Preceded by: Zoltán Vas
- Succeeded by: Andor Berei

Minister of Light Industry
- In office 1954–1955
- Preceded by: Árpád Kiss
- Succeeded by: Józsefné Nagy

Personal details
- Born: 26 July 1922 Kutas, Hungary
- Died: 18 September 2008 (aged 86) Budapest, Hungary
- Party: Hungarian Communist Party, Hungarian Working People's Party, Hungarian Socialist Workers' Party
- Occupation: Economist, diplomat

Béla Istvan Szalai (26 July 1922 – 18 September 2008) was a Hungarian communist politician, diplomat and economist.

== Biography ==
Szalai was born in to a poor peasant family. He attended elementary school in Szigetvár, then a commercial high school in Kaposvár. He started working in a company in 1940, while he continued his studies at the József Nádor Technical University. Near the end of World War II he participated in the communist resistance movement. In 1945 he joined the Hungarian Communist Party and got a position in the Hungarian Democratic Youth Association. In 1946 he obtained a diploma from the technical university, after 2 years he received his doctorate there.

Between 1948 and 1957 he was a deputy of the National Assembly. From 1949 he held high positions in the party thanks to Ernő Gerő's backing. In 1951 he attended a one-year party course in Moscow. In 1953 he headed the National Planning Office and later was minister of light industry. After the Hungarian Revolution of 1956 he was demoted and given a diplomatic assignment in East Berlin. He was deputy minister between 1963 and 1980, then until his retirement in 1985 he was ambassador to East Germany.
