= István Hidas =

Hungarian politician (1918–2002)

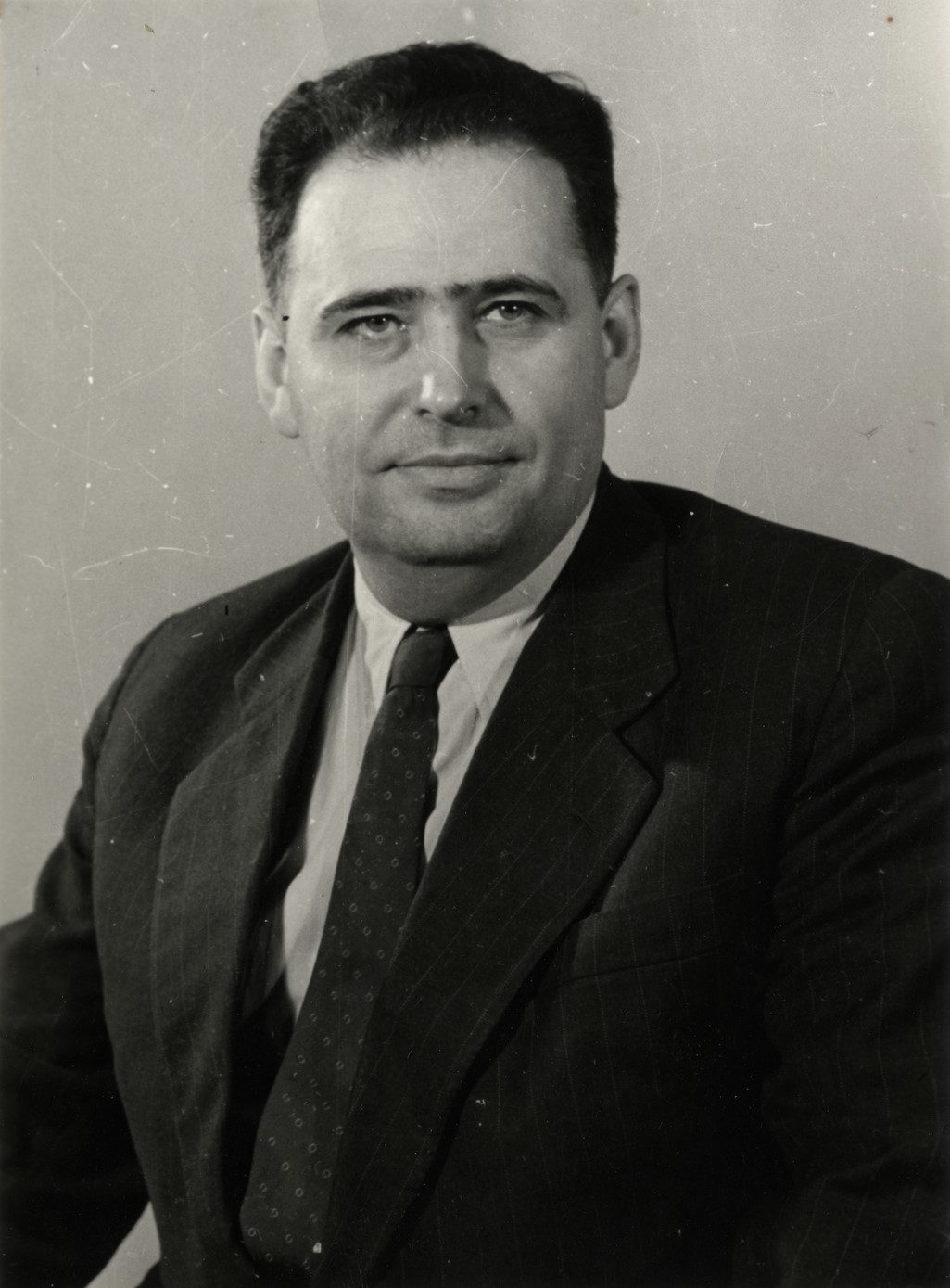
- Hidas in 1953

Vice-president of the Council of Ministers
- In office 30 July 1956 – 24 October 1956
- Prime Minister: Imre Nagy

Minister of Heavy Industry
- In office 4 July 1953 – 9 October 1954

Personal details
- Born: 29 September 1918 Nagyvárad, Hungary
- Died: 13 January 2002 (aged 83) Budapest, Hungary
- Party: Hungarian Communist Party; Hungarian Working People's Party; Hungarian Socialist Workers' Party

István Hidas (born István Háder, 29 September 1918 – 13 January 2002) was a Hungarian Communist politician.

== Biography ==
Hidas was born in a working-class family and himself worked as an iron worker. He was a member of the social democratic youth movement from the 1930s and joined the Social Democratic Party of Hungary in 1939.

During the Second World War he joined the illegal Hungarian Communist Party in 1943, became a member of the party's Buda committee and an active member of the Hungarian resistance.

After the war he worked as an instructor in various factories. From 1948 he was a member of the party committee of Budafok, from 1949 he worked in the MÁVAG. He was appointed secretary of the district party committee. In May 1950, he was elected a member of the Central Executive (KV) and the organizing committee of the Hungarian Working People's Party (MDP). From June 1950 to November 1952, he served as secretary of the Budapest Party Committee. From May 1951 he became a member of the Political Committee (PB) and the Secretariat. From November 1952 to July 1953, he served as vice-president of the Council of Ministers.

In June 1953, he was one of the Hungarian delegates invited to Moscow by the Soviet government, in whose presence Mátyás Rákosi was sharply criticized. Hidas was a member of Parliament for the Hungarian People's Patriotic Front from 1953 to 1957. From 4 July 1953 to 1954 he was Minister of Heavy Industry and then Minister for Chemicals and Energy for a short time. From October 1954 he was again Deputy Chairman of the Cabinet of Ministers, 1956, he was first vice-president from 30 July to 24 October of the same year.

He was expelled from the political committee on October 23, 1956, during the beginnings of the Hungarian Revolution for being a member of the "Rákosi clique", and from the party on November 16, but was later reinstated after János Kádár became first secretary of the Hungarian Socialist Workers' Party.

From June 1957 he worked for some time as head of department at the Ministry of Metallurgy and Mechanical Engineering until his retirement in 1974.
