= Géza Losonczy =

Hungarian journalist and politician

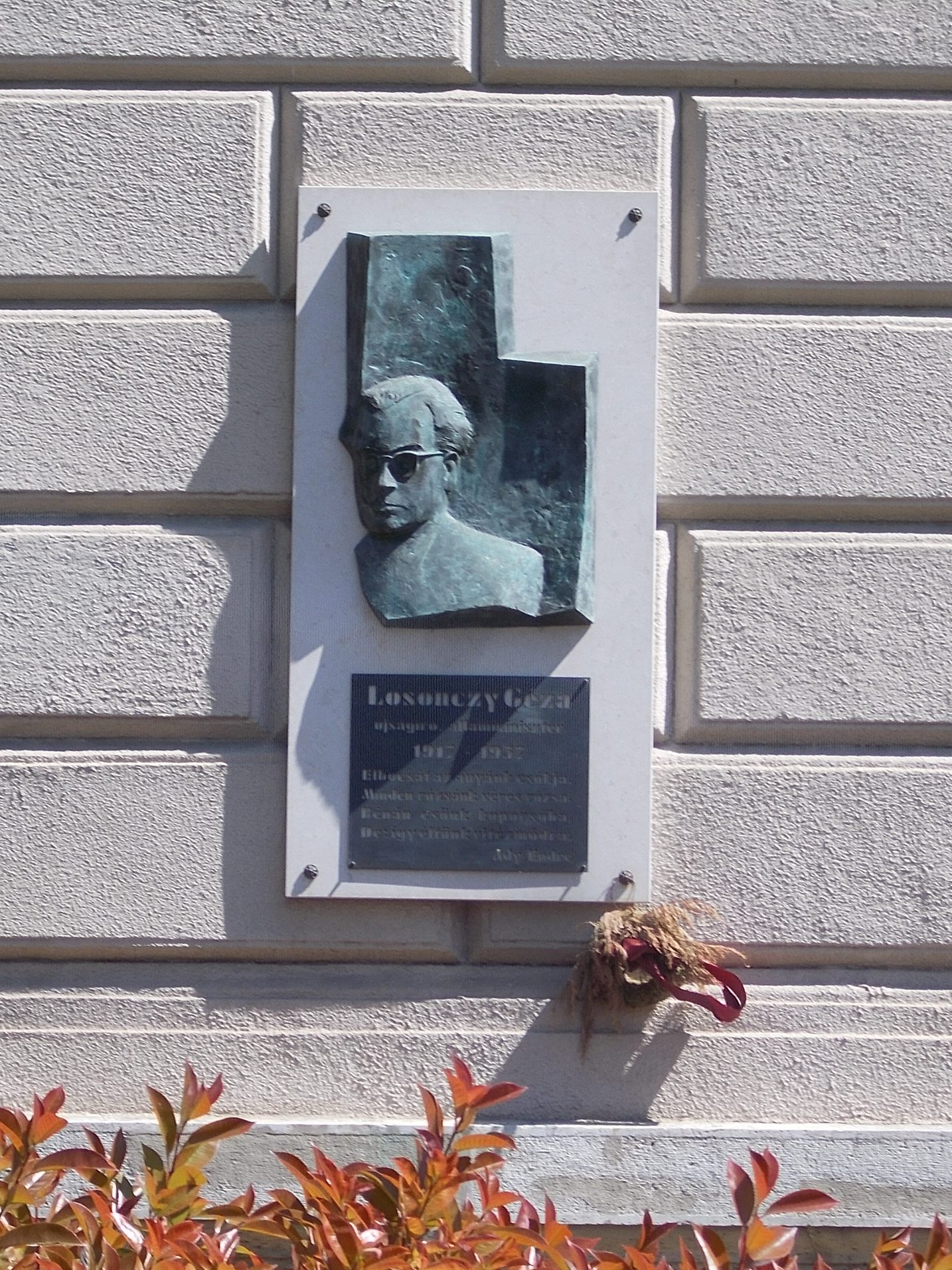

Géza Losonczy (5 May 1917, Érsekcsanád – 21 December 1957) was a Hungarian journalist and politician. He was associated with the reformist faction of the Hungarian communist party.

During the 1956 Hungarian revolution, he joined the Imre Nagy government as minister of press and propaganda affairs. He and Zoltán Tildy held the government's last press conference on 3 November. On 4 November, as the Soviet army poured into Budapest, he took refuge in the Yugoslavia Embassy, and on 22 November he and the other members of the Imre Nagy group were arrested and transported to Romania. He was brought back to Budapest in mid-April 1957. While in captivity, awaiting trial for treason, Losonczy went on hunger strike. He was scheduled to stand trial as the second accused in the trial of Imre Nagy and his government, but he died while on a hunger strike in prison awaiting trial when his jailers "carelessly pushed a feeding tube down his windpipe."
