= István Bibó =

Hungarian politician (1911–1979)

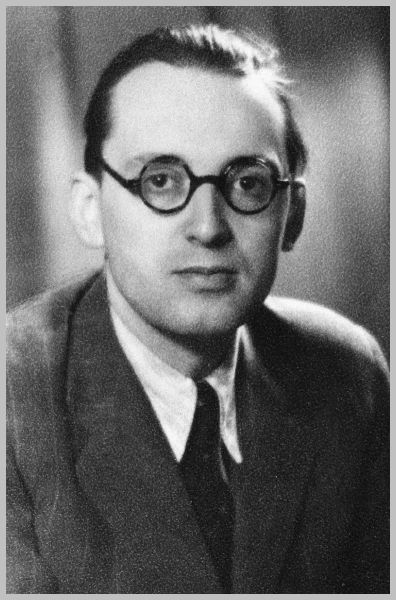
István Bibó (1935)

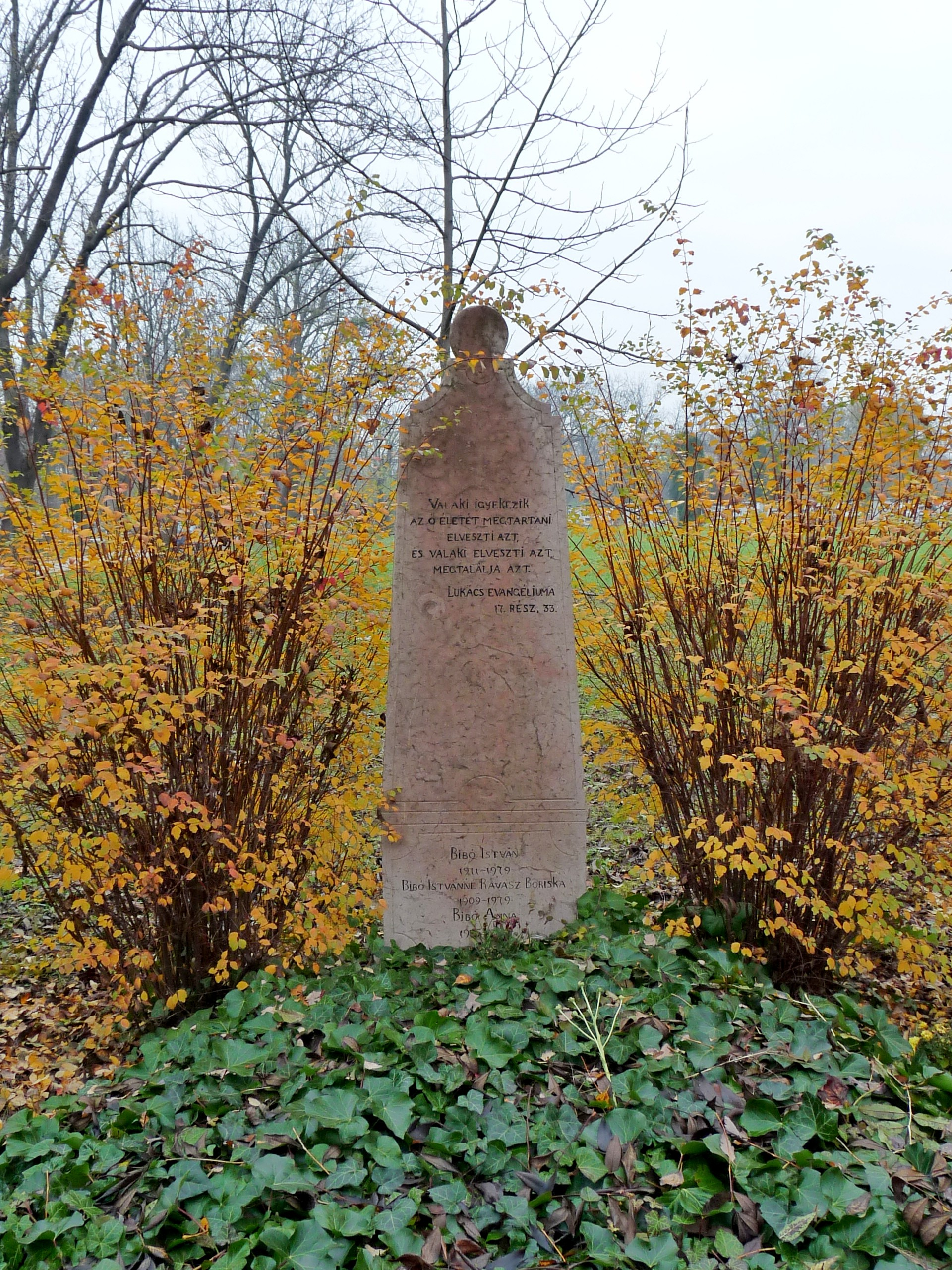
Grave of István Bibó in Óbuda Cemetery

István Bibó (7 August 1911 – 10 May 1979) was a Hungarian lawyer, civil servant, politician and political theorist.

== Life ==
Bibó was born into a petit-bourgeois Calvinist family in Szeged. His father, István Sr., was the director of the university library in Szeged, and his mother, Irén Graul, was the German-speaking daughter of a Reformed bishop. The collapse of the Austro-Hungarian Monarchy put his family into relative poverty and motivated him to study politics. He began his schooling in Budapest before attending the Piarist high school in Szeged. He then studied law at the Franz Joseph University in Szeged, where he befriended Ferenc Erdei and grew closer to Béla Reitzer, a high school friend. These friendships, both with future sociologists, sharpened his assessment of social inequality. Between 1933 and 1935, he undertook a study trip to western Europe; 1935, he received a PhD from the Graduate Institute of International and Development Studies, in Geneva.

Bibó returned to Hungary convinced of the need for a revolution which not only provided equal rights for all citizens, but also abolished the feudal inheritance of Hungary. In 1937, he was a signer of the radical Makó Manifesto. Nonetheless, he began practicing as a lawyer and became an official in the Ministry of Justice in 1938. In 1940, he joined the faculty of his alma mater. The acquisitions of Hungary following the Vienna Awards, however, meant that Bibó taught at faculties relocated from Szeged to Kolozsvár (now Cluj). Again working at the ministry during World War II, Bibó began forging documents allowing for the escape of Jews from Hungary, resulting in his arrest by the Gestapo in 1944. He was released at the behest of the ministry and spent the rest of World War II hiding in Budapest.

In February 1945, Bibó took up a post in the Interior Ministry under his friend Ferenc Erdei. In his position, Bibó played a major role in the organization of Hungary's first free elections and reestablishing public administration. He also participated in the deportation of the Danube Swabians. After leaving government service in July 1946, he was elected a corresponding member of the Hungarian Academy of Sciences and became a professor at the University of Szeged.

Bibó's professional prospects suffered significantly after the establishment of the Hungarian People's Republic. His membership in the Academy of Sciences was downgraded and he was forced out of his post at the University of Szeged. The journal which had published much of his writings to that date and which he edited, Válasz, was closed down. For the next seven years, Bibó lived a secluded life with his family as a low-level researcher.

During the Hungarian Revolution of 1956, Bibó was contacted by his former colleagues from the reformed National Peasant Party. On 3 November, was made a minister without portfolio in Imre Nagy's government. He arrived at Parliament on 4 November, where he found the government already disintegrating as the Soviet Army overran Budapest. He refused an offer to evacuate the building, and remained inside as it was occupied by Soviet and Internal Security troops. He was the last Minister left at his post in the building; as he waited to be forced out, he wrote his famous proclamation, "For Freedom and Truth" on a typewriter. He would deliver his "Proclamation" by hand to foreign embassies.

Bibó was arrested on 23 May 1957 and sentenced to life imprisonment on 2 August 1958 and spent six years in prison, including in Vác, where he participated in a hunger strike. He was released in the 1963 general amnesty. He was, however, not rehabilitated. He was given a minor position at the Central Statistical Office and continued to privately write new works. After a heart attack, he retired in 1971, and lived his last years out in poverty until his death on 10 May 1979.

Bibó was married to Boriska Ravasz, a Latin teacher and the daughter of a Reformed bishop (like his own mother). He had a son and two daughters. He kept the Reformed faith of his family throughout his life.

== Legacy ==
- Bibo Prize founded in Boston (1980)
- 5000 Forint coin issued by the National Bank of Hungary (2011)
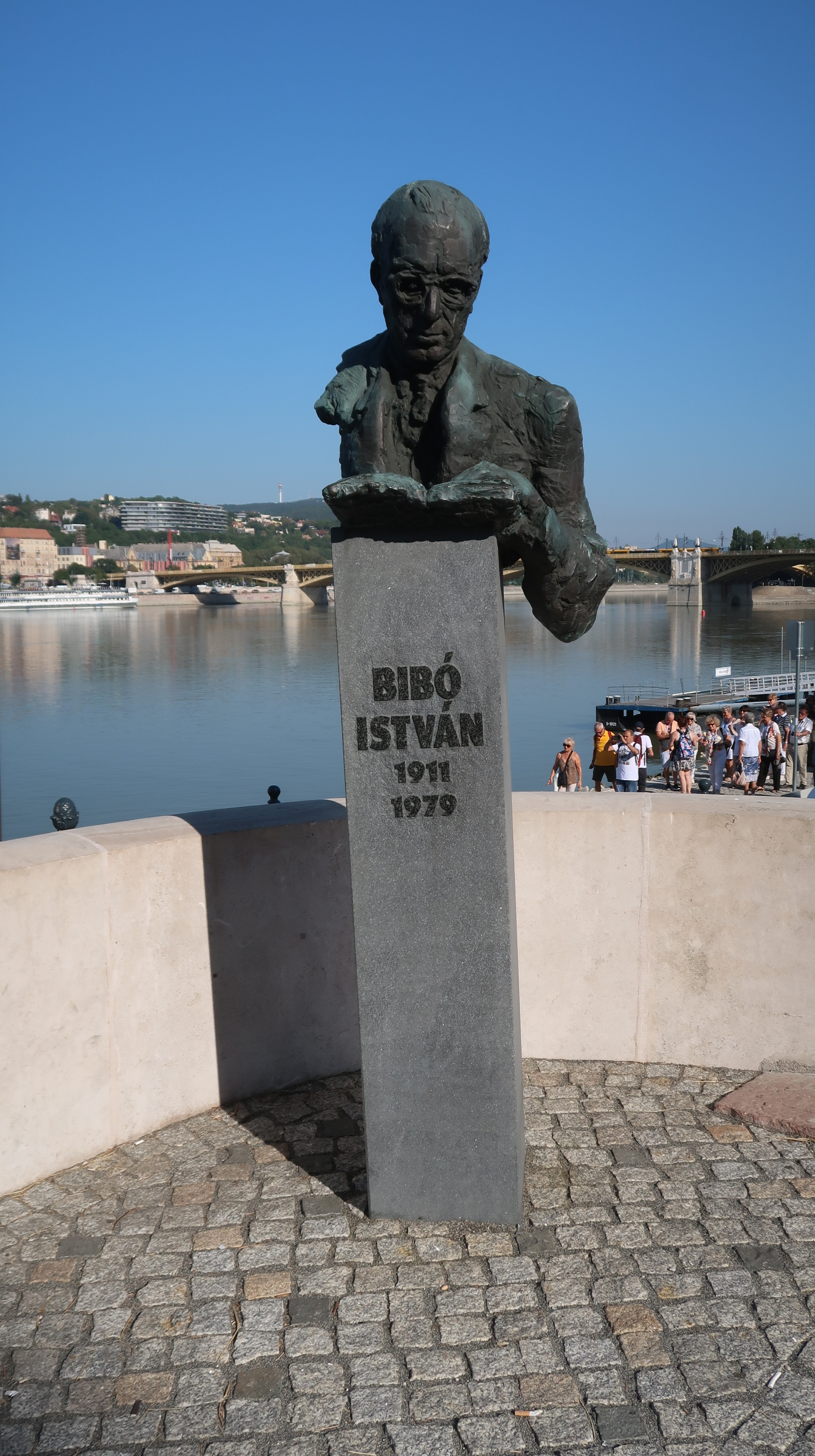
- Bust of István Bibó by sculptor Géza Széri-Varga (2005) on the banks of the Danube in Budapest near the Hungarian Parliament
  The Budapest Eötvös Loránd University named a special honors society/extracurricular studies program after Bibo – the Bibo Istvan Szakkollegium. The society is open to students of law or political sciences who pass a rigorous entrance exam. Attaining membership in the society is considered an honor of its own.

== Works ==
- The Crisis of Hungarian Democracy (in Hungarian). Antiqua, 1945, 40 pp.
- Valóság (October 1945) (in Hungarian)
- The Poverty of Eastern European Small States: (A kelet-európai kisállamok nyomorúsága, Új Magyarország, Bp., 1946 (in Hungarian)); Misère des petits États d'Europe de l'Est. L'Harmattan, 1986 (out of print); Albin Michel, Paris, 1993 (current edition) (in French)
- The Paralysis of International Institutions and the Remedies. A Study of Self-Determination, Concord among the Major Powers, and Political Arbitration (introduction by Bernard Crick). The Harvester Press, Hassocks, 1976
- Democracy, Revolution, Self-Determination: Selected Writings. Edited by Károly Nagy. Translated by András Boros-Kazai. Columbia University Press, New York, 1991
- The Art of Peacemaking: The Political Essays of István Bibó. New Haven: Yale University Press, 2015
