= Károly Olt =

Hungarian politician (1904–1985)

Minister of Finance of Hungary
- In office 24 February 1950 – 24 October 1956
- Prime Minister: István Dobi; Mátyás Rákosi; Imre Nagy; András Hegedüs
- Preceded by: István Kossa
- Succeeded by: István Kossa

Personal details
- Born: 14 May 1904 Zagreb, Kingdom of Croatia-Slavonia, Austria-Hungary
- Died: 22 March 1985 (aged 80) Budapest, Hungary
- Party: MDP, MSZMP
- Profession: politician, economist

Károly Olt (14 May 1904 – 22 March 1985) was a Hungarian politician, who served as Minister of Finance between 1950 and 1956.

He moved from Zagreb to Hungary in 1920 (after the Treaty of Trianon). He became a member of the Hungarian Communist Party in 1930. He was arrested and condemned because of his communist activities. After that Olt took part in the reestablishment of the communist party. Between 1947 and 1 June 1949 he served as Minister of Welfare. He was appointed Speaker of the National Assembly of Hungary in 1949. Between 1950 and 1951 he worked as secretary of the Presidential Council. After his financial ministership he was a member of the party's Central Leadership. Between 1957 and 1961 he was one of the members of the Presidential Council.

Political offices
Preceded by Imre Nagy	Speaker of the National Assembly; 1949	Succeeded by Lajos Drahos
Preceded by István Kossa	Minister of Finance; 1950–1956	Succeeded by István Kossa
