= Minister of Culture (Hungary) =

Government ministry of Hungary

Minister of Social Relations and Culture of Hungary
- Magyarország kultúráért és innovációért felelős minisztere

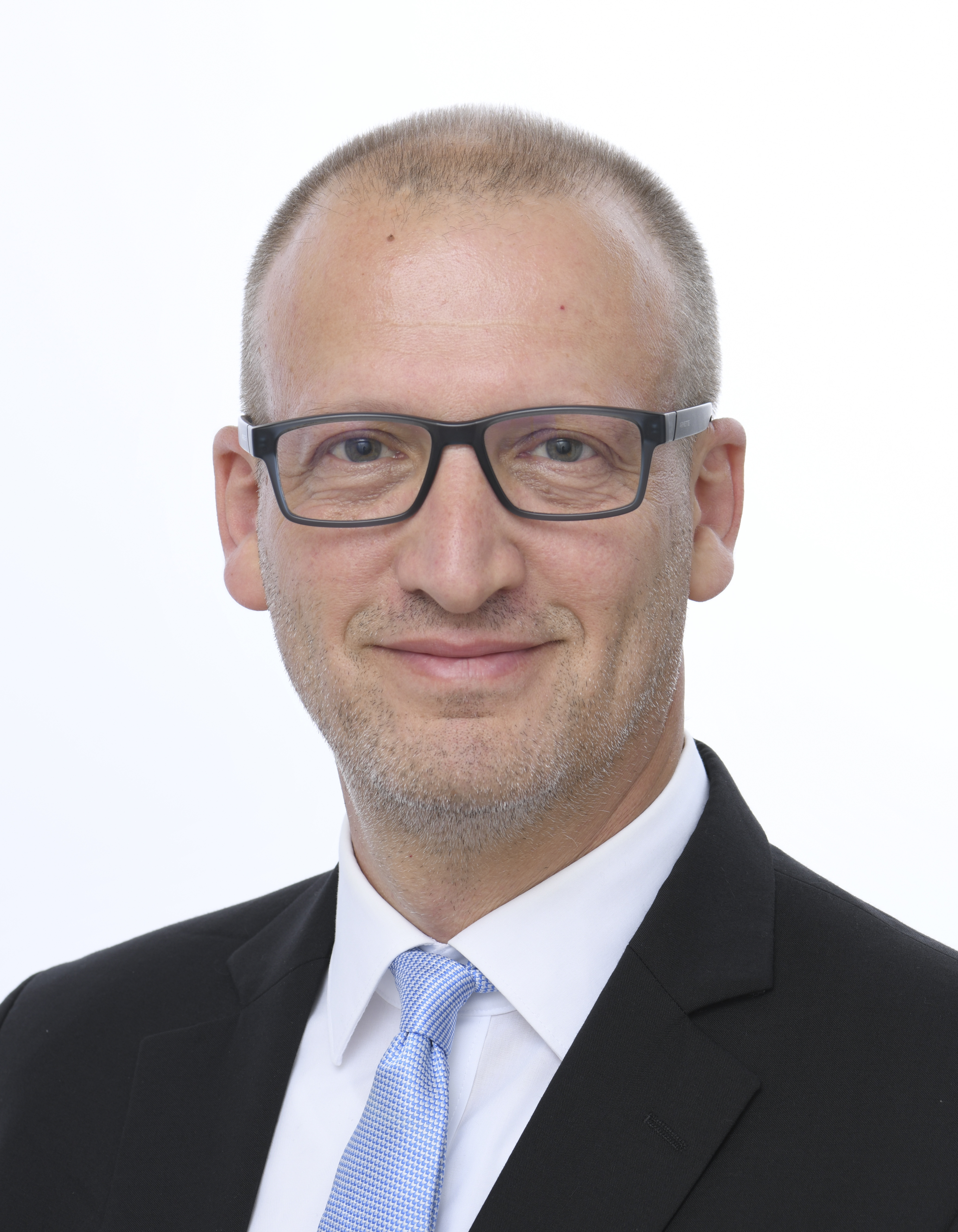
- Incumbent; Zoltan Tarr since 9 May 2026
- Ministry of Social Relations and Culture
- Type: Cabinet minister
- Member of: Cabinet; Council; Parliament
- Seat: Szemere utca 6. 1054 Budapest
- Nominator: Prime Minister of Hungary
- Appointer: President of Hungary
- Inaugural holder: József Révai
- Formation: 11 June 1949

The Minister of Culture of Hungary (Magyarország kultuszminisztere), officially the Minister of Social Relations and Culture (kultúráért és innovációért felelős miniszter) is a member of the cabinet of Hungary and head of the Ministry of Culture. The minister is responsible for cultural policy, including the arts, cultural heritage, museums, libraries, and the promotion of national culture. The minister oversees state cultural institutions and contributes to shaping Hungary’s cultural strategy both domestically and internationally.

Zoltán Tarr is the incumbent minister since 9 May 2026, under Prime Minister Péter Magyar. Magyar reorganized the ministry into the Ministry of Social Relations and Culture following the 2026 parliamentary election.

== Names and structure ==
Official name	Head	From	Until	Portfolio(s)
Minister of Popular Culture	Cabinet minister	11 June 1949	1 January 1957	culture
Ministry of Cultural Affairs	Cabinet minister	1 January 1957	21 June 1974	public education; higher education; culture
Ministry of Culture	Cabinet minister	21 June 1974	27 June 1980	culture
Ministry of Cultural Affairs	Cabinet minister	27 June 1980	23 May 1990	public education; higher education; culture
Ministry of Culture and Public Education	Cabinet minister	23 May 1990	8 July 1998	public education; higher education; culture
Ministry of National Cultural Heritage	Cabinet minister	8 July 1998	9 June 2006	culture
Ministry of Education and Culture	Cabinet minister	9 June 2006	29 May 2010	public education; higher education; culture
Ministry of National Resources	Cabinet minister	29 May 2010	14 May 2012	public education; higher education; health; culture; sport
Ministry of Human Resources	Cabinet minister	14 May 2012	24 May 2022	public education; higher education; health; culture; sport
Ministry of Culture and Innovation	Cabinet minister	24 May 2022	9 May 2026	higher education; culture
Ministry of Social Relations and Culture	Cabinet minister	9 May 2026	–	culture

== List of ministers ==
=== Hungarian Republic (1949) ===
Parties MDP

#	Picture	Name	From	Until	Political party	Cabinet	Assembly (Election)
Minister of Popular Culture
1		József Révai (1898–1959)	11 June 1949	20 August 1949	MDP	Dobi; MDP–FKGP–NPP	25 (1949)

=== Hungarian People's Republic (1949–1956) ===
Parties MDP MSZMP MSZP Independent

#	Picture	Name	From	Until	Political party	Cabinet	Assembly (Election)
Minister of Popular Culture
1		József Révai (1898–1959)	20 August 1949	14 August 1952	MDP	Dobi; MDP	25 (1949)
1		József Révai (1898–1959)	14 August 1952	4 July 1953	MDP	Rákosi; MDP	25 (1949)
2		József Darvas (1912–1973)	4 July 1953	18 April 1955	Independent	I. Nagy I MDP	26 (1953)
2		József Darvas (1912–1973)	18 April 1955	24 October 1956	Independent	Hegedüs; MDP	26 (1953)
2		József Darvas (1912–1973)	24 October 1956	27 October 1956	Independent	I. Nagy II; MDP/MSZMP–FKGP	26 (1953)
3		György Lukács (1885–1971)	27 October 1956	3 November 1956	MDP	I. Nagy II; MDP/MSZMP–FKGP	26 (1953)
The ministry was merged with the Ministry of Education (Oktatásügyi Minisztérium) to form the Ministry of Cultural Affairs (Művelődésügyi Minisztérium) on 1 January 1957.
Minister of Cultural Affairs
4		Albert Kónya (1917–1988)	1 January 1957	1 March 1957	MSZMP	Kádár I MSZMP	26 (1953)
5		Gyula Kállai (1910–1996)	1 March 1957	28 January 1958	MSZMP	Kádár I MSZMP	26 (1953)
6		Valéria Benke (1920–2009)	28 January 1958	13 September 1961	MSZMP	Münnich; MSZMP	26 (1953)
6		Valéria Benke (1920–2009)	28 January 1958	13 September 1961	MSZMP	Münnich; MSZMP	27 (1958)
7		Pál Ilku (1912–1973)	13 September 1961	30 June 1965	MSZMP	Kádár II; MSZMP	27 (1958)
7		Pál Ilku (1912–1973)	13 September 1961	30 June 1965	MSZMP	Kádár II; MSZMP	28 (1963)
7		Pál Ilku (1912–1973)	30 June 1965	14 April 1967	MSZMP	Kállai; MSZMP	28 (1963)
7		Pál Ilku (1912–1973)	14 April 1967	13 July 1973	MSZMP	Fock; MSZMP	29 (1967)
7		Pál Ilku (1912–1973)	14 April 1967	13 July 1973	MSZMP	Fock; MSZMP	30 (1971)
8		Miklós Nagy (1932–1974)	13 July 1973	29 April 1974	MSZMP	Fock; MSZMP	30 (1971)
9		Károly Polinszky (1922–1998)	29 April 1974	21 June 1974	MSZMP	Fock; MSZMP	30 (1971)
The ministry was divided into the Ministry of Education (Oktatásügyi Minisztérium) and the Ministry of Culture (Kulturális Minisztérium) on 21 June 1974.
Minister of Culture
10		László Orbán (1912–1978)	21 June 1974	15 May 1975	MSZMP	Fock; MSZMP	30 (1971)
10		László Orbán (1912–1978)	15 May 1975	22 July 1976	MSZMP	Lázár; MSZMP	30 (1971)
10		László Orbán (1912–1978)	15 May 1975	22 July 1976	MSZMP	Lázár; MSZMP	31 (1975)
11		Imre Pozsgay (1933–2016)	22 July 1976	27 June 1980	MSZMP	Lázár; MSZMP	31 (1975)
The ministry was merged with the Ministry of Education (Oktatásügyi Minisztérium) to form the Ministry of Cultural Affairs (Művelődési Minisztérium) on 27 June 1980.
Minister of Cultural Affairs
(11)		Imre Pozsgay (1933–2016)	27 June 1980	25 June 1982	MSZMP	Lázár; MSZMP	32 (1980)
12		Béla Köpeczi (1921–2010)	25 June 1982	25 June 1987	MSZMP	Lázár; MSZMP	32 (1980)
12		Béla Köpeczi (1921–2010)	25 June 1982	25 June 1987	MSZMP	Lázár; MSZMP	33 (1985)
12		Béla Köpeczi (1921–2010)	25 June 1987	29 June 1988	MSZMP	Grósz; MSZMP	33 (1985)
13		Tibor Czibere (1930–2023)	29 June 1988	24 November 1988	Independent	Grósz; MSZMP	33 (1985)
13		Tibor Czibere (1930–2023)	24 November 1988	10 May 1989	Independent	Németh (MSZMP)→MSZP	33 (1985)
14		Ferenc Glatz (1941–)	10 May 1989	23 October 1989	MSZP	Németh (MSZMP)→MSZP	33 (1985)

=== Republic of Hungary (1989–2012) ===
Parties MSZP MDF SZDSZ Independent Fidesz MSZP Independent

#	Picture	Name	From	Until	Political party	Cabinet	Assembly (Election)
Minister of Cultural Affairs
—		Ferenc Glatz (1941–) acting	23 October 1989	23 May 1990	MSZP	Németh; MSZP	—
The ministry was reorganized into the Ministry of Culture and Public Education (Művelődési és Közoktatási Minisztérium) on 23 May 1990.
Minister of Culture and Public Education
1		Bertalan Andrásfalvy (1931–)	23 May 1990	22 February 1993	MDF	Antall; MDF–FKGP–KDNP	34 (1990)
2		Ferenc Mádl (1931–2011)	22 February 1993	21 December 1993	Independent	Antall; MDF–FKGP–KDNP	34 (1990)
2		Ferenc Mádl (1931–2011)	21 December 1993	15 July 1994	Independent	Boross; MDF–EKGP–KDNP	34 (1990)
3		Gábor Fodor (1962–)	15 July 1994	31 December 1995	SZDSZ	Horn; MSZP–SZDSZ	35 (1994)
4		Bálint Magyar (1952–)	1 January 1996	8 July 1998	SZDSZ	Horn; MSZP–SZDSZ	35 (1994)
The ministry was divided into the Ministry of Education (Oktatási Minisztérium) and the Ministry of National Cultural Heritage (Nemzeti Kulturális Örökség Minisztériuma) on 8 July 1998.
Minister of National Cultural Heritage
5		József Hámori (1932–2021)	8 July 1998	31 December 1999	Independent	Orbán I Fidesz–FKGP–MDF	36 (1998)
6		Zoltán Rockenbauer (1960–)	1 January 2000	27 May 2002	Fidesz	Orbán I Fidesz–FKGP–MDF	36 (1998)
7		Gábor Görgey (1929–2022)	27 May 2002	18 May 2003	Independent	Medgyessy; MSZP–SZDSZ	37 (2002)
8		István Hiller (1964–)	18 May 2003	4 October 2004	MSZP	Medgyessy; MSZP–SZDSZ	37 (2002)
8		István Hiller (1964–)	4 October 2004	13 February 2005	MSZP	Gyurcsány I MSZP–SZDSZ	37 (2002)
9		András Bozóki (1959–)	13 February 2005	9 June 2006	Independent	Gyurcsány I MSZP–SZDSZ	37 (2002)
The ministry was merged with the Ministry of Education (Oktatási Minisztérium) to form the Ministry of Education and Culture (Oktatási és Kulturális Minisztérium) on 9 June 2006.
Minister of Education and Culture
(8)		István Hiller (1964–)	9 June 2006	16 April 2009	MSZP	Gyurcsány II; MSZP–SZDSZ	38 (2006)
(8)		István Hiller (1964–)	16 April 2009	29 May 2010	MSZP	Bajnai; MSZP	38 (2006)
The ministry was reorganized into the Ministry of National Resources (Nemzeti Erőforrás Minisztérium) on 29 May 2010.
Minister of National Resources
9		Miklós Réthelyi (1939–)	29 May 2010	1 January 2012	Independent	Orbán II; Fidesz–KDNP	39 (2010)

=== Hungary (2012–) ===
Parties Independent Fidesz Tisza Party

#	Picture	Name	From	Until	Political party	Cabinet	Assembly (Election)
Minister of National Resources
1		Miklós Réthelyi (1939–)	1 January 2012	14 May 2012	Independent	Orbán II; Fidesz–KDNP	39 (2010)
The ministry was reorganized into the Ministry of Human Resources (Emberi Erőforrások Minisztériuma) on 14 May 2012.
Minister of Human Resources
2		Zoltán Balog (1958–)	14 May 2012	6 June 2014	Fidesz	Orbán II; Fidesz–KDNP	39 (2010)
2		Zoltán Balog (1958–)	6 June 2014	18 May 2018	Fidesz	Orbán III; Fidesz–KDNP	40 (2014)
3		Miklós Kásler (1950–)	18 May 2018	24 May 2022	Independent	Orbán IV; Fidesz–KDNP	41 (2018)
The portfolio was reorganized into the Ministry of Culture and Innovation (Kulturális és Innovációs Minisztérium) on 24 May 2022.
Minister of Culture and Innovation
4		János Csák (1962–)	24 May 2022	1 July 2024	Independent	Orbán V Fidesz–KDNP	42 (2022)
5		Balázs Hankó (1978–)	1 July 2024	9 May 2026	Independent	Orbán V Fidesz–KDNP	42 (2022)
On 9 May 2026, the portfolio was reorganized as an independent ministry.
Minister of Social Relations and Culture
6		Zoltán Tarr (1972–)	12 May 2026	Incumbent	Tisza	Magyar; Tisza	43 (2026)

== Sources ==
- "182/2022. (V. 24.) Korm. rendelet a Kormány tagjainak feladat- és hatásköréről". Nemzeti Jogszabálytár (in Hungarian).

== See also ==
- Minister of Education (Hungary)
- List of heads of state of Hungary
- List of prime ministers of Hungary
- Politics of Hungary

Cabinet ministers

- Minister of Agriculture (Hungary)
- Minister of Civilian Intelligence Services (Hungary)
- Minister of Croatian Affairs of Hungary
- Minister of Defence (Hungary)
- Minister of Finance (Hungary)
- Minister of Foreign Affairs (Hungary)
- Minister of the Interior (Hungary)
- Minister of Justice (Hungary)
- Minister of Public Works and Transport (Hungary)
