= List of speakers of the National Assembly (Hungary) =

President of the National Assembly of Hungary
- Az Országgyűlés elnöke
- Coat of arms of the speaker

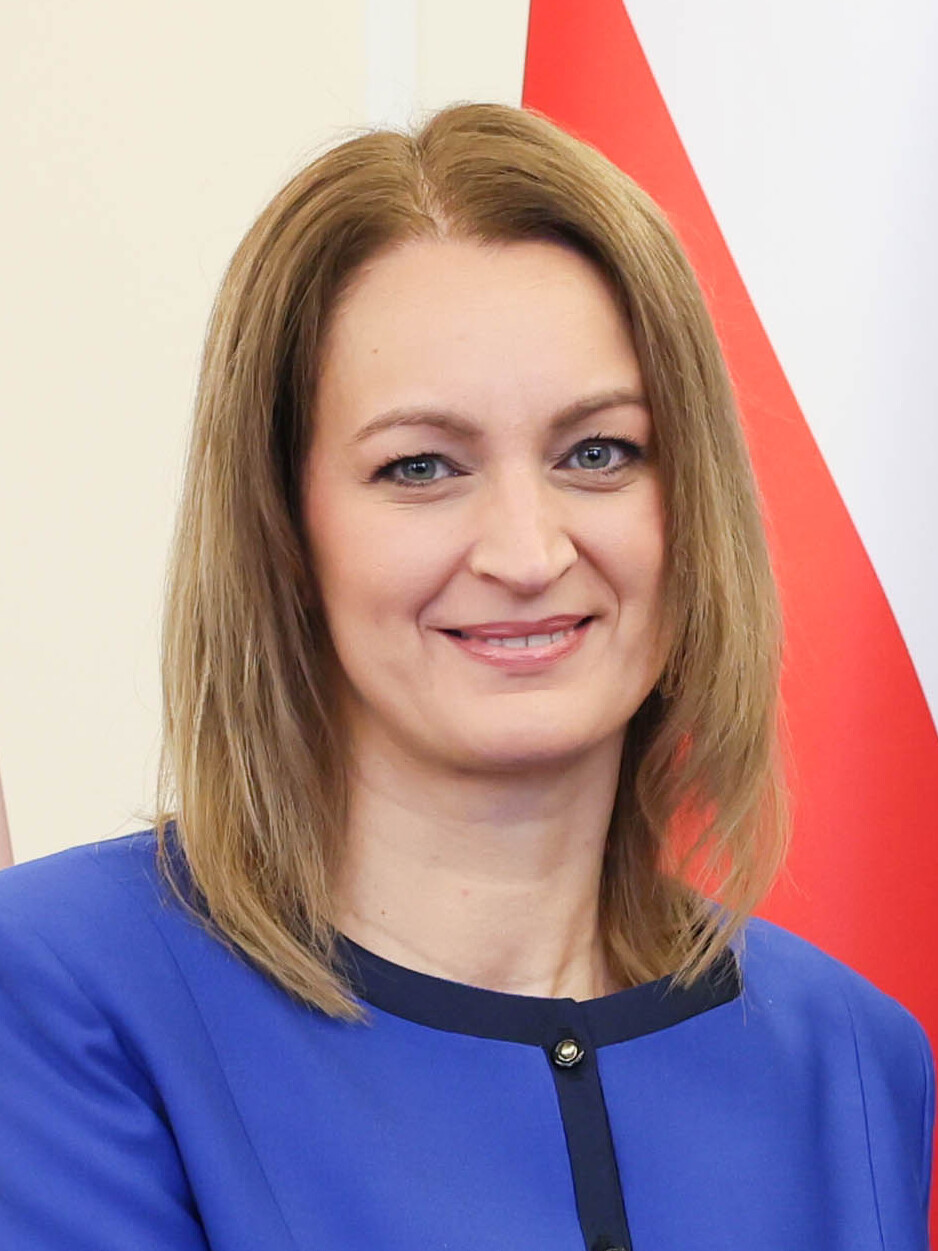
- Incumbent; Ágnes Forsthoffer since 9 May 2026
- Style: Sir/Madam
- Seat: Hungarian Parliament Building
- Appointer: National Assembly
- Term length: Four years
- Inaugural holder: István Rakovszky
- Formation: 18 February 1920
- Deputy: First Officer
- Salary: 38,400,000 Ft / US$135,549 annually
- Website: www.parlament.hu

The speaker of the National Assembly of Hungary (Hungarian: Az Országgyűlés elnöke, lit. 'President of the National Assembly', colloquially házelnök, lit. 'house-president') is the presiding officer of the National Assembly of Hungary. The current speaker is Ágnes Forsthoffer, since 9 May 2026.

Since 1990, the speaker of the National Assembly also serves as acting President of Hungary if the elected president vacates their office before the expiration of their term or if the president is temporarily incapacitated.

== List of officeholders ==
=== National Assembly of the Kingdom of Hungary ===
Parties KNEP OKGFP EP

No.	Portrait	Name (Birth–Death)	Term of office			Political party
No.	Portrait	Name (Birth–Death)	Took office	Left office	Tenure	Political party
1		István Rakovszky (1858–1931)	18 February 1920	30 July 1921	1 year, 162 days	KNEP
2		Gaszton Gaál (1868–1932)	12 August 1921	16 August 1922	1 year, 4 days	OKGFP
2		Gaszton Gaál (1868–1932)	12 August 1921	16 August 1922	1 year, 4 days	EP
3		Béla Scitovszky (1878–1959)	18 August 1922	18 October 1926	4 years, 61 days	EP
4		Tibor Zsitvay (1884–1969)	19 October 1926	28 January 1927	101 days	EP

In 1927 the National Assembly became bicameral.

=== Provisional National Assembly ===
Parties FKGP Independent

No.	Portrait	Name (Birth–Death)	Term of office			Political party
No.	Portrait	Name (Birth–Death)	Took office	Left office	Tenure	Political party
—		István Vásáry (1887–1955)	21 December 1944		1 day	FKGP
5		Béla Zsedényi (1894–1955)	21 December 1944	29 November 1945	343 days	Independent

=== National Assembly of the Second Hungarian Republic ===
Parties FKGP MKP/MDP

No.	Portrait	Name (Birth–Death)	Term of office			Political party	Assembly (Election)
No.	Portrait	Name (Birth–Death)	Took office	Left office	Tenure	Political party	Assembly (Election)
6		Ferenc Nagy (Note: Also served as Prime Minister from 4 February 1946) (1903–1979)	29 November 1945	7 February 1946	70 days	FKGP	1 (1945)
7		Béla Varga (1903–1995)	7 February 1946	3 July 1947	1 year, 146 days	FKGP	1 (1945)
8		Árpád Szabó (1878–1948)	4 July 1947	16 September 1947	74 days	FKGP	1 (1945)
9		Imre Nagy (1896–1958)	16 September 1947	8 June 1949	1 year, 265 days	MKP	2 (1947)
9		Imre Nagy (1896–1958)	16 September 1947	8 June 1949	1 year, 265 days	MDP	2 (1947)
10		Károly Olt (1904–1985)	8 June 1949	23 August 1949	76 days	MDP	2 (1947)

=== National Assembly of the Hungarian People's Republic ===
Parties MDP/MSZMP MSZP

No.	Portrait	Name (Birth–Death)	Term of office			Political party	Assembly (Election)
No.	Portrait	Name (Birth–Death)	Took office	Left office	Tenure	Political party	Assembly (Election)
11		Lajos Drahos (1895–1983)	23 August 1949	18 May 1951	1 year, 268 days	MDP	1 (1949)
12		Imre Dögei (1912–1964)	18 May 1951	14 August 1952	1 year, 88 days	MDP	1 (1949)
13		Sándor Rónai (1892–1965)	14 August 1952	21 March 1963	10 years, 219 days	MDP	1 (1949)
13		Sándor Rónai (1892–1965)	14 August 1952	21 March 1963	10 years, 219 days	MDP	2 (1953)
13		Sándor Rónai (1892–1965)	14 August 1952	21 March 1963	10 years, 219 days	MSZMP	2 (1953)
13		Sándor Rónai (1892–1965)	14 August 1952	21 March 1963	10 years, 219 days	MSZMP	3 (1958)
14		Erzsébet Metzker Vass (1915–1980)	21 March 1963	14 April 1967	4 years, 24 days	MSZMP	4 (1963)
15		Gyula Kállai (1910–1996)	14 April 1967	12 May 1971	4 years, 28 days	MSZMP	5 (1967)
16		Antal Apró (1913–1994)	12 May 1971	19 December 1984	13 years, 221 days	MSZMP	6 (1971)
16		Antal Apró (1913–1994)	12 May 1971	19 December 1984	13 years, 221 days	MSZMP	7 (1975)
16		Antal Apró (1913–1994)	12 May 1971	19 December 1984	13 years, 221 days	MSZMP	8 (1980)
17		István Sarlós (1921–2006)	19 December 1984	29 June 1988	3 years, 193 days	MSZMP	8 (1980)
17		István Sarlós (1921–2006)	19 December 1984	29 June 1988	3 years, 193 days	MSZMP	9 (1985)
18		István Stadinger (1927–2018)	29 June 1988	10 March 1989	254 days	MSZMP	9 (1985)
19		Mátyás Szűrös (born 1933)	10 March 1989	23 October 1989	227 days	MSZMP	9 (1985)
19		Mátyás Szűrös (born 1933)	10 March 1989	23 October 1989	227 days	MSZP	9 (1985)

=== National Assembly of Hungary (since 1989) ===
Parties SZDSZ MDF MSZP Fidesz TISZA Independent

No.	Portrait	Name (Birth–Death)	Term of office			Political party	Assembly (Election)
No.	Portrait	Name (Birth–Death)	Took office	Left office	Tenure	Political party	Assembly (Election)
—		István Fodor (born 1945)	23 October 1989	2 May 1990	191 days	Independent	—
20		Árpád Göncz (Note: Also served as acting President during his mandate) (1922–2015)	2 May 1990	3 August 1990	93 days	SZDSZ	1 (1990)
21		György Szabad (1924–2015)	3 August 1990	27 June 1994	3 years, 328 days	MDF	1 (1990)
22		Zoltán Gál (born 1940)	28 June 1994	17 June 1998	3 years, 354 days	MSZP	2 (1994)
23		János Áder (born 1959)	18 June 1998	14 May 2002	3 years, 330 days	Fidesz	3 (1998)
24		Katalin Szili (born 1956)	15 May 2002	14 September 2009	7 years, 122 days	MSZP	4 (2002)
24		Katalin Szili (born 1956)	15 May 2002	14 September 2009	7 years, 122 days	MSZP	5 (2006)
25		Béla Katona (born 1944)	15 September 2009	13 May 2010	240 days	MSZP	5 (2006)
26		Pál Schmitt (born 1942)	14 May 2010	5 August 2010	83 days	Fidesz	6 (2010)
27		László Kövér (Note: Also served as acting President from 2 April to 9 May 2012 and from 26 February to 5 March 2024) (born 1959)	6 August 2010	8 May 2026	15 years, 275 days	Fidesz	6 (2010)
27		László Kövér (born 1959)	6 August 2010	8 May 2026	15 years, 275 days	Fidesz	7 (2014)
27		László Kövér (born 1959)	6 August 2010	8 May 2026	15 years, 275 days	Fidesz	8 (2018)
27		László Kövér (born 1959)	6 August 2010	8 May 2026	15 years, 275 days	Fidesz	9 (2022)
28		Ágnes Forsthoffer (Note: Also serving as acting President from 20 July to 19 August 2026) (born 1980)	9 May 2026	Incumbent	121 days	Tisza Party (TISZA)	10 (2026)

== See also ==
- List of speakers of the House of Magnates
- List of speakers of the House of Representatives (Hungary)

== Sources ==
- Official website of the National Assembly of Hungary (in Hungarian)
