= Minister of Education (Hungary) =

Former Hungarian cabinet position (1953–1956, 1974–1980, 1998–2002)

Minister of Children and Education of Hungary
- Magyarország gyermek- és oktatásügyi minisztere
- Incumbent; Judit Lannert since 13 May 2026
- Ministry of Children and Education
- Type: Cabinet minister
- Member of: Cabinet; Council; Parliament
- Nominator: Prime Minister of Hungary
- Appointer: President of Hungary
- Constituting instrument: April Laws (1848)
- Inaugural holder: József Eötvös
- Formation: 7 April 1848

The Minister of Education (Hungarian: Magyarország oktatásügyi minisztere), officially the Minister of Children and Education (gyermek- és oktatásügyi miniszter) is a member of the Hungarian cabinet. The minister of education was Miklós Kásler until 2022 as minister of human capacities, when this task was given to the minister of interior Sándor Pintér until 9 May 2026.

== Minister of Education (1848) ==
=== Hungarian Kingdom (1848) ===
Parties Opposition Party

#	Picture	Name	From	Until	Political party	Cabinet	Assembly (Election)
1		József Eötvös (1813–1871)	7 April 1848	11 September 1848	Opposition Party	Batthyány	Last Diet
1		József Eötvös (1813–1871)	7 April 1848	11 September 1848	Opposition Party	Batthyány	1 (1848)
The Ministry of Education (Nevelésügyi Minisztérium) was reorganized into the Ministry of Religion and Public Education (Vallás- és Közoktatásügyi Minisztérium) on 12 September 1848.

== Ministers of Religion and Public Education (1848–1919) ==
=== Hungarian Kingdom (1848–1849) ===
Parties Opposition Party Independent

#	Picture	Name	From	Until	Political party	Cabinet	Assembly (Election)
—		Lajos Batthyány (1807–1849) acting	12 September 1848	28 September 1848	Opposition Party	Batthyány	1 (1848)
—		Károly Szász (1798–1853) acting as Secretary of State	28 September 1848	2 October 1848	Independent	Batthyány	1 (1848)
—		Károly Szász (1798–1853) acting as Secretary of State	2 October 1848	14 April 1849	Independent	Committee of National Defence	1 (1848)

=== Hungarian State (1849) ===
Parties Independent

#	Picture	Name	From	Until	Political party	Cabinet	Assembly (Election)
—		Károly Szász (1798–1853) acting as Secretary of State	14 April 1849	2 May 1849	Independent	Committee of National Defence	1 (1848)
1		Mihály Horváth (1809–1878)	2 May 1849	11 August 1849	Independent	Szemere	1 (1848)

After the collapse of the Hungarian Revolution of 1848, the Hungarian Kingdom became an integral part of the Austrian Empire until 1867, when dual Austro-Hungarian Monarchy was created.

=== Hungarian Kingdom (1867–1918) ===
Parties Deák Party/Liberal Party/National Party of Work F48P/F48P–Károlyi Catholic People's Party Independent

#	Picture	Name	From	Until	Political party	Cabinet	Assembly (Election)
1		József Eötvös (1813–1871)	20 February 1867	2 February 1871	Deák Party	Andrássy; DP	3 (1865)
1		József Eötvös (1813–1871)	20 February 1867	2 February 1871	Deák Party	Andrássy; DP	4 (1869)
—		József Szlávy (1818–1900) acting	2 February 1871	10 February 1871	Deák Party	Andrássy; DP	4 (1869)
2		Tivadar Pauler (1816–1886)	10 February 1871	14 November 1871	Deák Party	Andrássy; DP	4 (1869)
2		Tivadar Pauler (1816–1886)	14 November 1871	4 September 1872	Deák Party	Lónyay; DP	4 (1869)
2		Tivadar Pauler (1816–1886)	14 November 1871	4 September 1872	Deák Party	Lónyay; DP	5 (1872)
3		Ágoston Trefort (1817–1888)	4 September 1872	4 December 1872	Deák Party	Lónyay; DP	5 (1872)
3		Ágoston Trefort (1817–1888)	4 December 1872	21 March 1874	Deák Party	Szlávy; DP	5 (1872)
3		Ágoston Trefort (1817–1888)	21 March 1874	2 March 1875	Deák Party	Bittó; DP–BK	5 (1872)
(3)		Ágoston Trefort (1817–1888)	2 March 1875	20 October 1875	Liberal Party	Wenckheim; SZP	5 (1872)
(3)		Ágoston Trefort (1817–1888)	20 October 1875	22 August 1888 (died in office)	Liberal Party	K. Tisza; SZP	6 (1875)
(3)		Ágoston Trefort (1817–1888)	20 October 1875	22 August 1888 (died in office)	Liberal Party	K. Tisza; SZP	7 (1878)
(3)		Ágoston Trefort (1817–1888)	20 October 1875	22 August 1888 (died in office)	Liberal Party	K. Tisza; SZP	8 (1881)
(3)		Ágoston Trefort (1817–1888)	20 October 1875	22 August 1888 (died in office)	Liberal Party	K. Tisza; SZP	9 (1884)
(3)		Ágoston Trefort (1817–1888)	20 October 1875	22 August 1888 (died in office)	Liberal Party	K. Tisza; SZP	10 (1887)
—		Gábor Baross (1848–1892) acting	23 August 1888	22 September 1888	Liberal Party	K. Tisza; SZP	10 (1887)
4		Albin Csáky (1841–1912)	22 September 1888	13 March 1890	Liberal Party	K. Tisza; SZP	10 (1887)
4		Albin Csáky (1841–1912)	13 March 1890	17 November 1892	Liberal Party	Szapáry; SZP	11 (1892)
4		Albin Csáky (1841–1912)	17 November 1892	10 June 1894	Liberal Party	Wekerle I SZP	11 (1892)
5		Loránd Eötvös (1848–1919)	10 June 1894	15 January 1895	Liberal Party	Wekerle I SZP	11 (1892)
6		Gyula Wlassics (1852–1937)	15 January 1895	26 February 1899	Liberal Party	Bánffy; SZP	11 (1892)
6		Gyula Wlassics (1852–1937)	15 January 1895	26 February 1899	Liberal Party	Bánffy; SZP	12 (1896)
6		Gyula Wlassics (1852–1937)	26 February 1899	27 June 1903	Liberal Party	Széll; SZP	12 (1896)
6		Gyula Wlassics (1852–1937)	26 February 1899	27 June 1903	Liberal Party	Széll; SZP	13 (1901)
6		Gyula Wlassics (1852–1937)	27 June 1903	3 November 1903	Liberal Party	Khuen-Héderváry I SZP	13 (1901)
7		Albert Berzeviczy (1853–1936)	3 November 1903	18 June 1905	Liberal Party	I. Tisza I SZP	13 (1901)
8		György Lukács (1865–1950)	18 June 1905	6 March 1906	Independent	Fejérváry; SZP	14 (1905)
9		Gyula Tost (1846–1929)	6 March 1906	8 April 1906	Liberal Party	Fejérváry; SZP	14 (1905)
10		Albert Apponyi (1846–1933); 1st term	8 April 1906	17 January 1910	F48P	Wekerle II; F48P–OAP–KNP–PDP	15 (1906)
—		Ferenc Székely (1842–1921) acting	17 January 1910	1 March 1910	National Party of Work	Khuen-Héderváry II; NMP	15 (1906)
11		János Zichy (1868–1944); 1st term	1 March 1910	22 April 1912	National Party of Work	Khuen-Héderváry II; NMP	15 (1906)
11		János Zichy (1868–1944); 1st term	1 March 1910	22 April 1912	National Party of Work	Khuen-Héderváry II; NMP	16 (1910)
11		János Zichy (1868–1944); 1st term	22 April 1912	26 February 1913	National Party of Work	Lukács; NMP	16 (1910)
12		Béla Jankovich (1865–1939)	26 February 1913	10 June 1913	National Party of Work	Lukács; NMP	16 (1910)
12		Béla Jankovich (1865–1939)	10 June 1913	15 June 1917	National Party of Work	I. Tisza II; NMP	16 (1910)
(10)		Albert Apponyi (1846–1933); 2nd term	15 June 1917	23 August 1917	F48P	Esterházy; NMP–F48P–OAP–PDP–KNP	16 (1910)
(10)		Albert Apponyi (1846–1933); 2nd term	23 August 1917	8 May 1918	F48P	Wekerle III; NMP–F48P–OAP–PDP–KNP	16 (1910)
(11)		János Zichy (1868–1944); 2nd term	8 May 1918	31 October 1918	National Party of Work	Wekerle III; NMP–F48P–OAP–PDP–KNP	16 (1910)
—		Károly Huszár (1882–1941)	30 October 1918	31 October 1918	Catholic People's Party	Hadik not formed	16 (1910)
13		Márton Lovászy (1846–1933)	31 October 1918	16 November 1918	F48P–Károlyi	M. Károlyi; F48P–Károlyi–PRP–MSZDP	MNT (—)

=== Hungarian People's Republic (1918–1919) ===
Parties F48P–Károlyi

#	Picture	Name	From	Until	Political party	Cabinet	Assembly (Election)
1		Márton Lovászy (1846–1933)	16 November 1918	22 December 1918	F48P–Károlyi	M. Károlyi; F48P–Károlyi–PRP–MSZDP	MNT (—)
—		Sándor Juhász Nagy (1883–1946) acting as Secretary of State	22 December 1918	19 January 1919	F48P–Károlyi	M. Károlyi; F48P–Károlyi–PRP–MSZDP	MNT (—)
—		Sándor Juhász Nagy (1883–1946) acting as Secretary of State	19 January 1919	22 January 1919	F48P–Károlyi	Berinkey; F48P–Károlyi–PRP–MSZDP–OKGFP	MNT (—)
The ministry was divided into the Ministry of Religion (Vallásügyi Minisztérium) and the Ministry of Public Education (Közoktatásügyi Minisztérium) on 22 January 1919.

== Minister of Religion (1919) ==
=== Hungarian People's Republic (1919) ===
Parties Catholic People's Party

#	Picture	Name	From	Until	Political party	Cabinet	Assembly (Election)
1		János Vass (1873–1936)	22 January 1919	21 March 1919	Catholic People's Party	Berinkey; F48P–Károlyi–PRP–MSZDP–OKGFP	MNT (—)
The ministry was reorganized into the Liquidation Office of Religious Affairs (Vallásügyi Likvidáló Hivatal), subordinated to the People's Commissariat of Public Education (Közoktatásügyi Népbiztosság) on 21 March 1919.

== Minister of Public Education (1919) ==
=== Hungarian People's Republic (1919) ===
Parties MSZDP

#	Picture	Name	From	Until	Political party	Cabinet	Assembly (Election)
1		Zsigmond Kunfi (1879–1929)	22 January 1919	21 March 1919	MSZDP	Berinkey; F48P–Károlyi–PRP–MSZDP–OKGFP	MNT (—)
The ministry was reorganized into the People's Commissariat of Public Education (Közoktatásügyi Népbiztosság) on 21 March 1919.

== People's Commissars of Public Education (1919) ==
=== Hungarian Soviet Republic (1919) ===
Parties MSZP/SZKMMP

#	Picture	Name	From	Until	Political party	Cabinet	Assembly (Election)
1		György Lukács (1885–1971)	21 March 1919	3 April 1919	MSZP	Central Executive Council; MSZP/SZKMMP	TOGY (—)
2		József Pogány (1886–1938)	3 April 1919	1 August 1919	MSZP/SZKMMP	Central Executive Council; MSZP/SZKMMP	TOGY (—)
The Ministry of Religion and Public Education (Vallás- és Közoktatásügyi Minisztérium) was restored on 1 August 1919.

==== Counter-revolutionary governments (1919) ====
Parties Independent

#	Picture	Name	From	Until	Political party	Cabinet	Assembly (Election)
—		Béla Barabás (1855–1934)	5 May 1919	31 May 1919	Independent	Arad	—
—		Béla Kelemen (1863–1944)	6 June 1919	12 July 1919	Independent	Szeged II	—
—		Mihály Dömötör (1875–1962) acting	12 July 1919	12 August 1919	Independent	Szeged III	—
Serving as Minister of Religion and Public Education (vallás- és közoktatásügyi miniszter) during the Hungarian Soviet Republic.

== Ministers of Religion and Public Education (1919–1951) ==
=== Hungarian People's Republic (1919) ===
Parties MSZDP

#	Picture	Name	From	Until	Political party	Cabinet	Assembly (Election)
1		Sándor Garbai (1876–1924)	1 August 1919	6 August 1919 (deposed)	MSZDP	Peidl; MSZDP	—

=== Hungarian Republic (1919–1920) ===
Parties KNP/KNEP Independent

#	Picture	Name	From	Until	Political party	Cabinet	Assembly (Election)
1		Sándor Imre (1877–1945)	7 August 1919	15 August 1919	Independent	Friedrich; KNP/KNEP–OKGFP	—
2		Károly Huszár (1882–1941)	15 August 1919	24 November 1919	KNP/KNEP	Friedrich; KNP/KNEP–OKGFP	—
3		István Haller (1880–1964)	24 November 1919	29 February 1920	KNEP	Huszár; KNEP–OKGFP–MSZDP–NDPP	—

=== Hungarian Kingdom (1920–1946) ===
Parties EP–NEP–MÉP KNEP KGSZP Conservative Party

#	Picture	Name	From	Until	Political party	Cabinet	Assembly (Election)
1		István Haller (1880–1964)	29 February 1920	15 March 1920	OKGFP	Huszár; KNEP–OKGFP–MSZDP–NDPP	—
1		István Haller (1880–1964)	15 March 1920	19 July 1920	OKGFP	Simonyi-Semadam; KNEP–OKGFP	17 (1920)
1		István Haller (1880–1964)	19 July 1920	16 December 1920	OKGFP	Teleki I KNEP–OKGFP	17 (1920)
2		József Vass (1877–1930)	16 December 1920	14 April 1921	KNEP	Teleki I KNEP–OKGFP	17 (1920)
2		József Vass (1877–1930)	14 April 1921	2 February 1922	KNEP	Bethlen (KNEP–OKGFP)→EP	17 (1920)
(2)		József Vass (1877–1930)	2 February 1922	16 June 1922	EP	Bethlen (KNEP–OKGFP)→EP	17 (1920)
3		Kunó Klebelsberg (1875–1932)	16 June 1922	24 August 1931	EP	Bethlen (KNEP–OKGFP)→EP	18 (1922)
3		Kunó Klebelsberg (1875–1932)	16 June 1922	24 August 1931	EP	Bethlen (KNEP–OKGFP)→EP	19 (1926)
3		Kunó Klebelsberg (1875–1932)	16 June 1922	24 August 1931	EP	Bethlen (KNEP–OKGFP)→EP	20 (1931)
4		Sándor Ernszt (1870–1938)	24 August 1931	16 December 1931	KGSZP	G. Károlyi; EP–KGSZP	20 (1931)
5		Jenő Karafiáth (1883–1952)	16 December 1931	1 October 1932	Conservative Party	G. Károlyi; EP–KGSZP	20 (1931)
6		Bálint Hóman (1885–1951); 1st term	1 October 1932	6 October 1936	NEP	Gömbös; NEP	20 (1931)
6		Bálint Hóman (1885–1951); 1st term	1 October 1932	6 October 1936	NEP	Gömbös; NEP	21 (1935)
6		Bálint Hóman (1885–1951); 1st term	6 October 1936	14 May 1938	NEP	Darányi; NEP	21 (1935)
7		Pál Teleki (1879–1941)	14 May 1938	16 February 1939	NEP	Imrédy; NEP	21 (1935)
(6)		Bálint Hóman (1885–1951); 2nd term	16 February 1939	3 April 1941	MÉP	Teleki II; MÉP	21 (1935)
(6)		Bálint Hóman (1885–1951); 2nd term	16 February 1939	3 April 1941	MÉP	Teleki II; MÉP	22 (1939)
(6)		Bálint Hóman (1885–1951); 2nd term	3 April 1941	9 March 1942	MÉP	Bárdossy; MÉP	22 (1939)
(6)		Bálint Hóman (1885–1951); 2nd term	9 March 1942	3 July 1942	MÉP	Kállay; MÉP	22 (1939)
8		Jenő Szinyei Merse (1888–1957)	3 July 1942	22 March 1944 (deposed)	NEP	Kállay; MÉP	22 (1939)
9		István Antal (1896–1975)	22 March 1944	29 August 1944	MÉP	Sztójay; MÉP–MMP	22 (1939)
10		Iván Rakovszky (1885–1960)	29 August 1944	16 October 1944 (deposed)	MÉP	Lakatos; MÉP	22 (1939)

==== Government of National Unity (1944–1945) ====
Parties Party of Hungarian Renewal (MMP) NYKP

#	Picture	Name	From	Until	Political party	Cabinet	Assembly (Election)
1		Ferenc Rajniss (1893–1946)	16 October 1944	7 March 1945	MMP	Szálasi; NYKP–MMP	—
—		Ferenc Szálasi (1897–1946) acting	7 March 1945	28 March 1945	NYKP	Szálasi; NYKP–MMP	—

==== Soviet-backed provisional governments (1944–1946) ====
Parties NPP Independent

#	Picture	Name	From	Until	Political party	Cabinet	Assembly (Election)
1		Géza Teleki (1911–1983)	22 December 1944	13 November 1945	Independent	Provisional National Government; FKGP–MKP–MSZDP–NPP–PDP	INGY (1944)
2		Dezső Keresztury (1904–1996)	15 November 1945	1 February 1946	NPP	Tildy; FKGP–MKP–MSZDP–NPP	23 (1945)

=== Hungarian Republic (1946–1949) ===
Parties NPP FKGP

#	Picture	Name	From	Until	Political party	Cabinet	Assembly (Election)
1		Dezső Keresztury (1904–1996)	1 February 1946	14 March 1947	NPP	F. Nagy; FKGP–MKP–MSZDP–NPP	23 (1945)
2		Gyula Ortutay (1910–1978)	14 March 1947	31 May 1947	FKGP	F. Nagy; FKGP–MKP–MSZDP–NPP	23 (1945)
2		Gyula Ortutay (1910–1978)	31 May 1947	10 December 1948	FKGP	Dinnyés; MKP–FKGP–MSZDP–NPP	23 (1945)
2		Gyula Ortutay (1910–1978)	31 May 1947	10 December 1948	FKGP	Dinnyés; MKP–FKGP–MSZDP–NPP	24 (1947)
2		Gyula Ortutay (1910–1978)	10 December 1948	20 August 1949	FKGP	Dobi; MDP–FKGP–NPP	24 (1947)
2		Gyula Ortutay (1910–1978)	10 December 1948	20 August 1949	FKGP	Dobi; MDP–FKGP–NPP	25 (1949)
The ministry was divided into the Ministry of Religion and Public Education (Vallás- és Közoktatásügyi Minisztérium) and the Ministry of Popular Culture (Népművelési Minisztérium) on 11 June 1949.

=== Hungarian People's Republic (1949–1951) ===
Parties Independent

#	Picture	Name	From	Until	Political party	Cabinet	Assembly (Election)
1		Gyula Ortutay (1910–1978)	20 August 1949	25 February 1950	Independent	Dobi; MDP	25 (1949)
2		József Darvas (1912–1973)	25 February 1950	19 May 1951	Independent	Dobi; MDP	25 (1949)
The ministry was divided into the Ministry of Public Education (Közoktatásügyi Minisztérium) and the State Office for Church Affairs (Állami Egyházügyi Hivatal) on 19 May 1951.

== Ministers of Public Education (1951–1953) ==
=== Hungarian People's Republic (1951–1953) ===
Parties Independent

#	Picture	Name	From	Until	Political party	Cabinet	Assembly (Election)
1		József Darvas (1912–1973)	19 May 1951	14 August 1952	Independent	Dobi; MDP	25 (1949)
1		József Darvas (1912–1973)	14 August 1952	4 July 1953	Independent	Rákosi; MDP	25 (1949)
The ministry was merged with the Ministry of Higher Education (Felsőoktatásügyi Minisztérium) to form the Ministry of Education (Oktatásügyi Minisztérium) on 4 July 1953.

== Minister of Higher Education (1952–1953) ==
=== Hungarian People's Republic (1952–1953) ===
Parties MDP

#	Picture	Name	From	Until	Political party	Cabinet	Assembly (Election)
1		Tibor Erdey-Grúz (1902–1976)	6 December 1952	4 July 1953	MDP	Rákosi; MDP	25 (1949)
The ministry was merged with the Ministry of Public Education (Közoktatásügyi Minisztérium) to form the Ministry of Education (Oktatásügyi Minisztérium) on 4 July 1953.

== Ministers of Education (1953–1956) ==
=== Hungarian People's Republic (1953–1956) ===
Parties MDP

#	Picture	Name	From	Until	Political party	Cabinet	Assembly (Election)
1		Tibor Erdey-Grúz (1902–1976)	4 July 1953	18 April 1955	MDP	I. Nagy I MDP	26 (1953)
1		Tibor Erdey-Grúz (1902–1976)	18 April 1955	30 July 1956	MDP	Hegedüs; MDP	26 (1953)
2		Albert Kónya (1917–1988)	30 July 1956	24 October 1956	MDP	Hegedüs; MDP	26 (1953)
2		Albert Kónya (1917–1988)	24 October 1956	3 November 1956	MDP	I. Nagy II; MDP/MSZMP–FKGP	26 (1953)
2		Albert Kónya (1917–1988)	4 November 1956	31 December 1956	MDP	Kádár I MSZMP	26 (1953)
The ministry was merged with the Ministry of Popular Culture (Népművelési Minisztérium) to form the Ministry of Cultural Affairs (Művelődésügyi Minisztérium) on 1 January 1957.

== Ministers of Popular Culture (1949–1956) ==
=== Hungarian Republic (1949) ===
Parties MDP

#	Picture	Name	From	Until	Political party	Cabinet	Assembly (Election)
1		József Révai (1898–1959)	11 June 1949	20 August 1949	MDP	Dobi; MDP–FKGP–NPP	25 (1949)

=== Hungarian People's Republic (1949–1956) ===
Parties MDP Independent

#	Picture	Name	From	Until	Political party	Cabinet	Assembly (Election)
1		József Révai (1898–1959)	20 August 1949	14 August 1952	MDP	Dobi; MDP	25 (1949)
1		József Révai (1898–1959)	14 August 1952	4 July 1953	MDP	Rákosi; MDP	25 (1949)
2		József Darvas (1912–1973)	4 July 1953	18 April 1955	Independent	I. Nagy I MDP	26 (1953)
2		József Darvas (1912–1973)	18 April 1955	24 October 1956	Independent	Hegedüs; MDP	26 (1953)
2		József Darvas (1912–1973)	24 October 1956	27 October 1956	Independent	I. Nagy II; MDP/MSZMP–FKGP	26 (1953)
3		György Lukács (1885–1971)	27 October 1956	3 November 1956	MDP	I. Nagy II; MDP/MSZMP–FKGP	26 (1953)
The ministry was merged with the Ministry of Education (Oktatásügyi Minisztérium) to form the Ministry of Cultural Affairs (Művelődésügyi Minisztérium) on 1 January 1957.

== Ministers of Cultural Affairs (1957–1974) ==
=== Hungarian People's Republic (1957–1974) ===
Parties MSZMP

#	Picture	Name	From	Until	Political party	Cabinet	Assembly (Election)
1		Albert Kónya (1917–1988)	1 January 1957	1 March 1957	MSZMP	Kádár I MSZMP	26 (1953)
2		Gyula Kállai (1910–1996)	1 March 1957	28 January 1958	MSZMP	Kádár I MSZMP	26 (1953)
3		Valéria Benke (1920–2009)	28 January 1958	13 September 1961	MSZMP	Münnich; MSZMP	26 (1953)
3		Valéria Benke (1920–2009)	28 January 1958	13 September 1961	MSZMP	Münnich; MSZMP	27 (1958)
4		Pál Ilku (1912–1973)	13 September 1961	30 June 1965	MSZMP	Kádár II; MSZMP	27 (1958)
4		Pál Ilku (1912–1973)	13 September 1961	30 June 1965	MSZMP	Kádár II; MSZMP	28 (1963)
4		Pál Ilku (1912–1973)	30 June 1965	14 April 1967	MSZMP	Kállai; MSZMP	28 (1963)
4		Pál Ilku (1912–1973)	14 April 1967	13 July 1973	MSZMP	Fock; MSZMP	29 (1967)
4		Pál Ilku (1912–1973)	14 April 1967	13 July 1973	MSZMP	Fock; MSZMP	30 (1971)
5		Miklós Nagy (1932–1974)	13 July 1973	29 April 1974	MSZMP	Fock; MSZMP	30 (1971)
6		Károly Polinszky (1922–1998)	29 April 1974	21 June 1974	MSZMP	Fock; MSZMP	30 (1971)
The ministry was divided into the Ministry of Education (Oktatásügyi Minisztérium) and the Ministry of Culture (Kulturális Minisztérium) on 21 June 1974.

== Ministers of Education (1974–1980) ==
=== Hungarian People's Republic (1974–1980) ===
Parties MSZMP

#	Picture	Name	From	Until	Political party	Cabinet	Assembly (Election)
1		Károly Polinszky (1922–1998)	21 June 1974	15 May 1975	MSZMP	Fock; MSZMP	30 (1971)
1		Károly Polinszky (1922–1998)	15 May 1975	27 June 1980	MSZMP	Lázár; MSZMP	30 (1971)
1		Károly Polinszky (1922–1998)	15 May 1975	27 June 1980	MSZMP	Lázár; MSZMP	31 (1975)
The ministry was merged with the Ministry of Culture (Kulturális Minisztérium) to form the Ministry of Cultural Affairs (Művelődési Minisztérium) on 27 June 1980.

== Ministers of Culture (1974–1980) ==
=== Hungarian People's Republic (1974–1980) ===
Parties MSZMP

#	Picture	Name	From	Until	Political party	Cabinet	Assembly (Election)
1		László Orbán (1912–1978)	21 June 1974	15 May 1975	MSZMP	Fock; MSZMP	30 (1971)
1		László Orbán (1912–1978)	15 May 1975	22 July 1976	MSZMP	Lázár; MSZMP	30 (1971)
1		László Orbán (1912–1978)	15 May 1975	22 July 1976	MSZMP	Lázár; MSZMP	31 (1975)
2		Imre Pozsgay (1933–2016)	22 July 1976	27 June 1980	MSZMP	Lázár; MSZMP	31 (1975)
The ministry was merged with the Ministry of Education (Oktatásügyi Minisztérium) to form the Ministry of Cultural Affairs (Művelődési Minisztérium) on 27 June 1980.

== Ministers of Cultural Affairs (1980–1990) ==
=== Hungarian People's Republic (1980–1989) ===
Parties MSZMP

#	Picture	Name	From	Until	Political party	Cabinet	Assembly (Election)
1		Imre Pozsgay (1933–2016)	27 June 1980	25 June 1982	MSZMP	Lázár; MSZMP	32 (1980)
2		Béla Köpeczi (1921–2010)	25 June 1982	25 June 1987	MSZMP	Lázár; MSZMP	32 (1980)
2		Béla Köpeczi (1921–2010)	25 June 1982	25 June 1987	MSZMP	Lázár; MSZMP	33 (1985)
2		Béla Köpeczi (1921–2010)	25 June 1987	29 June 1988	MSZMP	Grósz; MSZMP	33 (1985)
3		Tibor Czibere (1930–2023)	29 June 1988	24 November 1988	Independent	Grósz; MSZMP	33 (1985)
3		Tibor Czibere (1930–2023)	24 November 1988	10 May 1989	Independent	Németh (MSZMP)→MSZP	33 (1985)
4		Ferenc Glatz (1941–)	10 May 1989	23 October 1989	MSZP	Németh (MSZMP)→MSZP	33 (1985)

=== Hungarian Republic (1989–1990) ===
Parties MSZP

#	Picture	Name	From	Until	Political party	Cabinet	Assembly (Election)
—		Ferenc Glatz (1941–) provisional	23 October 1989	23 May 1990	MSZP	Németh; MSZP	—
The ministry was reorganized into the Ministry of Culture and Public Education (Művelődési és Közoktatási Minisztérium) on 23 May 1990.

== Ministers of Culture and Public Education (1990–1998) ==
=== Hungarian Republic (1990–1998) ===
Parties MDF SZDSZ Independent

#	Picture	Name	From	Until	Political party	Cabinet	Assembly (Election)
1		Bertalan Andrásfalvy (1931–)	23 May 1990	22 February 1993	MDF	Antall; MDF–FKGP–KDNP	34 (1990)
2		Ferenc Mádl (1931–2011)	22 February 1993	21 December 1993	Independent	Antall; MDF–FKGP–KDNP	34 (1990)
2		Ferenc Mádl (1931–2011)	21 December 1993	15 July 1994	Independent	Boross; MDF–EKGP–KDNP	34 (1990)
3		Gábor Fodor (1962–)	15 July 1994	31 December 1995	SZDSZ	Horn; MSZP–SZDSZ	35 (1994)
4		Bálint Magyar (1952–)	1 January 1996	8 July 1998	SZDSZ	Horn; MSZP–SZDSZ	35 (1994)
The ministry was divided into the Ministry of Education (Oktatási Minisztérium) and the Ministry of National Cultural Heritage (Nemzeti Kulturális Örökség Minisztériuma) on 8 July 1998.

== Minister of Education (1998–2006) ==
=== Hungarian Republic (1998–2006) ===
Parties Fidesz SZDSZ

#	Picture	Name	From	Until	Political party	Cabinet	Assembly (Election)
1		Zoltán Pokorni (1962–)	8 July 1998	15 July 2001	Fidesz	Orbán I Fidesz–FKGP–MDF	36 (1998)
2		József Pálinkás (1952–)	15 July 2001	27 May 2002	Fidesz	Orbán I Fidesz–FKGP–MDF	36 (1998)
3		Bálint Magyar (1952–)	27 May 2002	4 October 2004	SZDSZ	Medgyessy; MSZP–SZDSZ	37 (2002)
3		Bálint Magyar (1952–)	4 October 2004	9 June 2006	SZDSZ	Gyurcsány I MSZP–SZDSZ	37 (2002)
The ministry was merged with the Ministry of National Cultural Heritage (Nemzeti Kulturális Örökség Minisztériuma) to form the Ministry of Education and Culture (Oktatási és Kulturális Minisztérium) on 9 June 2006.

== Ministers of National Cultural Heritage (1998–2006) ==
=== Hungarian Republic (1998–2006) ===
Parties Fidesz MSZP Independent

#	Picture	Name	From	Until	Political party	Cabinet	Assembly (Election)
1		József Hámori (1932–2021)	8 July 1998	31 December 1999	Independent	Orbán I Fidesz–FKGP–MDF	36 (1998)
2		Zoltán Rockenbauer (1960–)	1 January 2000	27 May 2002	Fidesz	Orbán I Fidesz–FKGP–MDF	36 (1998)
3		Gábor Görgey (1929–2022)	27 May 2002	18 May 2003	Independent	Medgyessy; MSZP–SZDSZ	37 (2002)
4		István Hiller (1964–)	18 May 2003	4 October 2004	MSZP	Medgyessy; MSZP–SZDSZ	37 (2002)
4		István Hiller (1964–)	4 October 2004	13 February 2005	MSZP	Gyurcsány I MSZP–SZDSZ	37 (2002)
5		András Bozóki (1959–)	13 February 2005	9 June 2006	Independent	Gyurcsány I MSZP–SZDSZ	37 (2002)
The ministry was merged with the Ministry of Education (Oktatási Minisztérium) to form the Ministry of Education and Culture (Oktatási és Kulturális Minisztérium) on 9 June 2006.

== Minister of Education and Culture (2006–2010) ==
=== Hungarian Republic (2006–2010) ===
Parties MSZP

#	Picture	Name	From	Until	Political party	Cabinet	Assembly (Election)
1		István Hiller (1964–)	9 June 2006	16 April 2009	MSZP	Gyurcsány II; MSZP–SZDSZ	38 (2006)
1		István Hiller (1964–)	16 April 2009	29 May 2010	MSZP	Bajnai; MSZP	38 (2006)
The ministry was reorganized into the Ministry of National Resources (Nemzeti Erőforrás Minisztérium) on 29 May 2010.

== Minister of National Resources (2010–2012) ==
=== Hungarian Republic / Hungary (2010–2012) ===
Parties Independent

#	Picture	Name	From	Until	Political party	Cabinet	Assembly (Election)
1		Miklós Réthelyi (1939–)	29 May 2010	14 May 2012	Independent	Orbán II; Fidesz–KDNP	39 (2010)
The ministry was reorganized into the Ministry of Human Resources (Emberi Erőforrások Minisztériuma) on 14 May 2012.

== Minister of Human Resources (2012–2022) ==
=== Hungary (2012–2022) ===
Parties Fidesz Independent

#	Picture	Name	From	Until	Political party	Cabinet	Assembly (Election)
1		Zoltán Balog (1958–)	14 May 2012	6 June 2014	Fidesz	Orbán II; Fidesz–KDNP	39 (2010)
1		Zoltán Balog (1958–)	6 June 2014	18 May 2018	Fidesz	Orbán III; Fidesz–KDNP	40 (2014)
2		Miklós Kásler (1950–2025)	18 May 2018	24 May 2022	Independent	Orbán IV; Fidesz–KDNP	41 (2018)
The ministry was reorganized into the Ministry of Interior (Belügyminisztérium) on 24 May 2022.

== Minister of Children and Education (2026–) ==
Parties Tisza Party

#	Picture	Name	From	Until	Political party	Cabinet	Assembly (Election)
1		Judit Lannert (1962–)	9 May 2026	Incumbent	Independent (affiliated with TISZA)	Magyar; TISZA	43 (2026)

== See also ==
- List of heads of state of Hungary
- List of prime ministers of Hungary
- Politics of Hungary

Cabinet ministers

- Minister of Agriculture (Hungary)
- Minister of Civilian Intelligence Services (Hungary)
- Minister of Croatian Affairs of Hungary
- Minister of Defence (Hungary)
- Minister of Finance (Hungary)
- Minister of Foreign Affairs (Hungary)
- Minister of the Interior (Hungary)
- Minister of Justice (Hungary)
- Minister of Public Works and Transport (Hungary)
