= Minister of the Interior (Hungary) =

Minister of Interior of Hungary
- Magyarország belügyminisztere
- Incumbent; Gábor Pósfai since 13 May 2026
- Ministry of Interior
- Type: Minister
- Member of: Government of Hungary
- Formation: 17 March 1848
- First holder: Bertalan Szemere

The minister of interior of Hungary (Hungarian: Magyarország belügyminisztere) is a member of the Government of Hungary and the head of the Ministry of Interior. The current interior minister is Gábor Pósfai.

The position was called People's Commissar of Interior (Hungarian: belügyi népbiztos) during the Hungarian Soviet Republic in 1919 and Minister of Local Government (Hungarian: önkormányzati miniszter) between 2006 and 2010, when the ministry was divided into the Ministry of Local Government and the Ministry of Justice and Law.

== Ministers of Interior (1848–1919) ==
=== Hungarian Kingdom (1848–1849) ===
Parties Opposition Party

No.	Portrait	Name (Birth–Death)	Term of office		Political party	Cabinet	Assembly (Election)
1		Bertalan Szemere (1812–1869)	17 March 1848	2 October 1848	Opposition Party	Batthyány	Last Diet
1		Bertalan Szemere (1812–1869)	17 March 1848	2 October 1848	Opposition Party	Batthyány	1 (1848)
2		Committee of National Defence	2 October 1848	14 April 1849	—	Committee of National Defence	1 (1848)

=== Hungarian State (1849) ===
Parties Opposition Party

No.	Portrait	Name (Birth–Death)	Term of office		Political party	Cabinet	Assembly (Election)
1		Committee of National Defence	14 April 1849	2 May 1849	—	Committee of National Defence	1 (1848)
2		Bertalan Szemere (1812–1869)	2 May 1849	11 August 1849	Opposition Party	Szemere	1 (1848)

After the collapse of the Hungarian Revolution of 1848, the Hungarian Kingdom became an integral part of the Austrian Empire until 1867, when dual Austro-Hungarian Monarchy was created.

=== Hungarian Kingdom (1867–1918) ===
Parties Deák Party/Liberal Party/National Party of Work National Constitution Party F48P/F48P–Károlyi Independent

No.	Portrait	Name (Birth–Death)	Term of office		Political party	Cabinet	Assembly (Election)
1		Béla Wenckheim (1811–1879)	20 February 1867	21 October 1869	Deák Party	Andrássy; DP	3 (1865)
1		Béla Wenckheim (1811–1879)	20 February 1867	21 October 1869	Deák Party	Andrássy; DP	4 (1869)
2		Pál Rajner (1823–1879)	21 October 1869	10 February 1871	Deák Party	Andrássy; DP	4 (1869)
3		Vilmos Tóth (1832–1898)	10 February 1871	14 November 1871	Deák Party	Andrássy; DP	4 (1869)
3		Vilmos Tóth (1832–1898)	14 November 1871	4 December 1872	Deák Party	Lónyay; DP	4 (1869)
3		Vilmos Tóth (1832–1898)	14 November 1871	4 December 1872	Deák Party	Lónyay; DP	5 (1872)
3		Vilmos Tóth (1832–1898)	4 December 1872	5 March 1873	Deák Party	Szlávy; DP	5 (1872)
4		Gyula Szapáry (1832–1905); 1st term	5 March 1873	21 March 1874	Deák Party	Szlávy; DP	5 (1872)
4		Gyula Szapáry (1832–1905); 1st term	21 March 1874	2 March 1875	Deák Party	Bittó; DP–BK	5 (1872)
5		Kálmán Tisza (1830–1902)	2 March 1875	20 October 1875	Liberal Party	Wenckheim; SZP	5 (1872)
5		Kálmán Tisza (1830–1902)	20 October 1875	11 February 1887	Liberal Party	K. Tisza; SZP	6 (1875)
5		Kálmán Tisza (1830–1902)	20 October 1875	11 February 1887	Liberal Party	K. Tisza; SZP	7 (1878)
5		Kálmán Tisza (1830–1902)	20 October 1875	11 February 1887	Liberal Party	K. Tisza; SZP	8 (1881)
5		Kálmán Tisza (1830–1902)	20 October 1875	11 February 1887	Liberal Party	K. Tisza; SZP	9 (1884)
—		Béla Orczy (1822–1917) acting	11 February 1887	22 March 1889	Liberal Party	K. Tisza; SZP	9 (1884)
—		Béla Orczy (1822–1917) acting	11 February 1887	22 March 1889	Liberal Party	K. Tisza; SZP	10 (1887)
—		Gábor Baross (1848–1892) acting	22 March 1889	16 June 1889	Liberal Party	K. Tisza; SZP	10 (1887)
6		Géza Teleki (1843–1913)	16 June 1889	15 March 1890	Liberal Party	K. Tisza; SZP	10 (1887)
(4)		Gyula Szapáry (1832–1905); 2nd term	15 March 1890	17 November 1892	Liberal Party	Szapáry; SZP	10 (1887)
(4)		Gyula Szapáry (1832–1905); 2nd term	15 March 1890	17 November 1892	Liberal Party	Szapáry; SZP	11 (1892)
7		Károly Hieronymi (1836–1911)	17 November 1892	15 January 1895	Liberal Party	Wekerle I SZP	11 (1892)
8		Dezső Perczel (1848–1913)	15 January 1895	26 February 1899	Liberal Party	Bánffy; SZP	11 (1892)
8		Dezső Perczel (1848–1913)	15 January 1895	26 February 1899	Liberal Party	Bánffy; SZP	12 (1896)
—		Kálmán Széll (1843–1915) acting	26 February 1899	27 June 1903	Liberal Party	Széll; SZP	12 (1896)
—		Kálmán Széll (1843–1915) acting	26 February 1899	27 June 1903	Liberal Party	Széll; SZP	13 (1901)
9		Károly Khuen-Héderváry (1849–1918); 1st term	27 June 1903	3 November 1903	Liberal Party	Khuen-Héderváry I SZP	13 (1901)
10		István Tisza (1861–1918)	3 November 1903	18 June 1905	Liberal Party	I. Tisza I SZP	13 (1901)
11		József Kristóffy (1857–1928)	18 June 1905	8 April 1906	Liberal Party	Fejérváry; SZP	14 (1905)
12		Gyula Andrássy, Jr. (1860–1929)	8 April 1906	17 January 1910	National Constitution Party	Wekerle II; F48P–OAP–KNP–PDP	14 (1905)
12		Gyula Andrássy, Jr. (1860–1929)	8 April 1906	17 January 1910	National Constitution Party	Wekerle II; F48P–OAP–KNP–PDP	15 (1906)
(9)		Károly Khuen-Héderváry (1849–1918); 2nd term	17 January 1910	22 April 1912	National Party of Work	Khuen-Héderváry II; NMP	15 (1906)
(9)		Károly Khuen-Héderváry (1849–1918); 2nd term	17 January 1910	22 April 1912	National Party of Work	Khuen-Héderváry II; NMP	16 (1910)
13		László Lukács (1850–1932)	22 April 1912	10 June 1913	National Party of Work	Lukács; NMP	16 (1910)
14		János Sándor (1860–1922)	10 June 1913	15 June 1917	National Party of Work	I. Tisza II; NMP	16 (1910)
15		Gábor Ugron (1880–1960)	15 June 1917	23 August 1917	National Party of Work	Esterházy; NMP–F48P–OAP–PDP–KNP	16 (1910)
15		Gábor Ugron (1880–1960)	23 August 1917	25 January 1918	National Party of Work	Wekerle III; NMP–F48P–OAP–PDP–KNP	16 (1910)
16		János Tóth (1864–1929)	25 January 1918	8 May 1918	F48P	Wekerle III; NMP–F48P–OAP–PDP–KNP	16 (1910)
—		Sándor Wekerle (1848–1921) acting	8 May 1918	31 October 1918	National Party of Work	Wekerle III; NMP–F48P–OAP–PDP–KNP	16 (1910)
—		Lajos Návay (1870–1919)	30 October 1918	31 October 1918	Independent	Hadik not formed	16 (1910)
17		Tivadar Batthyány (1859–1931)	31 October 1918	16 November 1918	F48P–Károlyi	M. Károlyi; F48P–Károlyi–PRP–MSZDP	MNT (—)

=== Hungarian People's Republic (1918–1919) ===
Parties F48P–Károlyi

No.	Portrait	Name (Birth–Death)	Term of office		Political party	Cabinet	Assembly (Election)
1		Tivadar Batthyány (1859–1931)	16 November 1918	12 December 1918	F48P–Károlyi	M. Károlyi; F48P–Károlyi–PRP–MSZDP	MNT (—)
2		Vince Nagy (1886–1965)	12 December 1918	11 January 1919	F48P–Károlyi	M. Károlyi; F48P–Károlyi–PRP–MSZDP	MNT (—)
2		Vince Nagy (1886–1965)	11 January 1919	21 March 1919	F48P–Károlyi	Berinkey; F48P–Károlyi–PRP–MSZDP–OKGFP	MNT (—)

== People's Commissars of Interior (1919) ==
=== Hungarian Soviet Republic (1919) ===
Parties MSZP/SZKMMP

No.	Portrait	Name (Birth–Death)	Term of office		Political party	Cabinet	Assembly (Election)
1		Jenő Landler (1875–1928) serving with Béla Vágó	21 March 1919	1 August 1919	MSZP/SZKMMP	Central Executive Council; MSZP/SZKMMP	TOGY (—)
1		Béla Vágó (1881–1939) serving with Jenő Landler	21 March 1919	1 August 1919	MSZP/SZKMMP	Central Executive Council; MSZP/SZKMMP	TOGY (—)

==== Counter-revolutionary governments (1919) ====
Parties Independent

No.	Portrait	Name (Birth–Death)	Term of office		Political party	Cabinet	Assembly (Election)
—		Ábel Bartha	5 May 1919	31 May 1919	Independent	Arad	—
—		Béla Kelemen (1863–1944)	31 May 1919	6 June 1919	Independent	Szeged I	—
—		Béla Kelemen (1863–1944)	6 June 1919	12 July 1919	Independent	Szeged II	—
—		Aladár Balla (1867–1935)	12 July 1919	12 August 1919	Independent	Szeged III	—

== Ministers of Interior (1919–2006) ==
=== Hungarian People's Republic (1919) ===
Parties MSZDP

No.	Portrait	Name (Birth–Death)	Term of office		Political party	Cabinet	Assembly (Election)
1		Károly Peyer (1881–1956)	1 August 1919	6 August 1919 (deposed)	MSZDP	Peidl; MSZDP	—

=== Hungarian Republic (1919–1920) ===
Parties KNP/KNEP Independent

No.	Portrait	Name (Birth–Death)	Term of office		Political party	Cabinet	Assembly (Election)
1		Adolf Samassa (1867–1929)	7 August 1919	15 August 1919	Independent	Friedrich; KNP/KNEP–OKGFP	—
2		Zsigmond Perényi (1870–1946)	15 August 1919	27 August 1919	KNP	Friedrich; KNP/KNEP–OKGFP	—
3		István Friedrich (1883–1951)	27 August 1919	11 September 1919	KNP	Friedrich; KNP/KNEP–OKGFP	—
4		Ödön Beniczky (1878–1931)	11 September 1919	24 November 1919	KNP/KNEP	Friedrich; KNP/KNEP–OKGFP	—
4		Ödön Beniczky (1878–1931)	24 November 1919	29 February 1920	KNP/KNEP	Huszár; KNEP–OKGFP–MSZDP–NDPP	—

=== Hungarian Kingdom (1920–1946) ===
Parties KNEP National Smallholders and Agricultural Labourers Party (OKGFP) EP–NEP–MÉP Party of Hungarian Renewal (MMP) Independent

No.	Portrait	Name (Birth–Death)	Term of office		Political party	Cabinet	Assembly (Election)
1		Ödön Beniczky (1878–1931)	29 February 1920	15 March 1920	KNEP	Huszár; KNEP–OKGFP–MSZDP–NDPP	—
2		Sándor Simonyi-Semadam (1864–1946) acting	15 March 1920	19 April 1920	KNEP	Simonyi-Semadam; KNEP–OKGFP	17 (1920)
3		Mihály Dömötör (1875–1962)	19 April 1920	19 July 1920	KNEP	Simonyi-Semadam; KNEP–OKGFP	17 (1920)
4		Gyula Ferdinandy (1873–1960)	19 July 1920	19 February 1921	OKGFP	Teleki I KNEP–OKGFP	17 (1920)
5		Vilmos Pál Tomcsányi (1880–1959)	19 February 1921	14 April 1921	OKGFP	Teleki I KNEP–OKGFP	17 (1920)
6		Gedeon Ráday (1872–1937)	14 April 1921	3 December 1921	KNEP	Bethlen (KNEP–OKGFP)→EP	17 (1920)
7		Kunó Klebelsberg (1875–1932)	3 December 1921	2 February 1922	KNEP	Bethlen (KNEP–OKGFP)→EP	17 (1920)
(7)		Kunó Klebelsberg (1875–1932)	2 February 1922	6 June 1922	EP	Bethlen (KNEP–OKGFP)→EP	17 (1920)
8		Iván Rakovszky (1885–1960)	6 June 1922	15 October 1926	EP	Bethlen (KNEP–OKGFP)→EP	18 (1922)
9		Béla Scitovszky (1878–1959)	15 October 1926	24 August 1931	EP	Bethlen (KNEP–OKGFP)→EP	18 (1922)
9		Béla Scitovszky (1878–1959)	15 October 1926	24 August 1931	EP	Bethlen (KNEP–OKGFP)→EP	19 (1926)
9		Béla Scitovszky (1878–1959)	15 October 1926	24 August 1931	EP	Bethlen (KNEP–OKGFP)→EP	20 (1931)
10		Ferenc Keresztes-Fischer (1881–1948); 1st term	24 August 1931	1 October 1932	EP	G. Károlyi; EP–KGSZP	20 (1931)
10		Ferenc Keresztes-Fischer (1881–1948); 1st term	1 October 1932	4 March 1935	NEP	Gömbös; NEP	20 (1931)
11		Miklós Kozma (1884–1941)	4 March 1935	12 October 1936	NEP	Gömbös; NEP	20 (1931)
11		Miklós Kozma (1884–1941)	4 March 1935	12 October 1936	NEP	Gömbös; NEP	21 (1935)
11		Miklós Kozma (1884–1941)	12 October 1936	3 February 1937	NEP	Darányi; NEP	21 (1935)
—		Kálmán Darányi (1886–1939) acting	3 February 1937	10 April 1937	NEP	Darányi; NEP	21 (1935)
12		József Széll (1880–1956)	10 April 1937	14 May 1938	NEP	Darányi; NEP	21 (1935)
(10)		Ferenc Keresztes-Fischer (1881–1948); 2nd term	14 May 1938	16 February 1939	NEP	Imrédy; NEP	21 (1935)
(10)		Ferenc Keresztes-Fischer (1881–1948); 2nd term	16 February 1939	3 April 1941	MÉP	Teleki II; MÉP	21 (1935)
(10)		Ferenc Keresztes-Fischer (1881–1948); 2nd term	16 February 1939	3 April 1941	MÉP	Teleki II; MÉP	22 (1939)
(10)		Ferenc Keresztes-Fischer (1881–1948); 2nd term	3 April 1941	9 March 1942	MÉP	Bárdossy; MÉP	22 (1939)
(10)		Ferenc Keresztes-Fischer (1881–1948); 2nd term	9 March 1942	22 March 1944 (deposed)	MÉP	Kállay; MÉP	22 (1939)
13		Andor Jaross (1896–1946)	22 March 1944	17 August 1944	MMP	Sztójay; MÉP–MMP	22 (1939)
14		Miklós Bonczos (1897–1971)	17 August 1944	29 August 1944	MÉP	Sztójay; MÉP–MMP	22 (1939)
14		Miklós Bonczos (1897–1971)	29 August 1944	12 October 1944	MÉP	Lakatos; MÉP	22 (1939)
—		Béla Horváth (1886–1978) acting for Miklós Bonczos as Secretary of State	6 September 1944	12 October 1944	MÉP	Lakatos; MÉP	22 (1939)
15		Péter Schell (1898–1974)	12 October 1944	16 October 1944 (deposed)	MÉP	Lakatos; MÉP	22 (1939)

==== Government of National Unity (1944–1945) ====
Parties Arrow Cross Party

No.	Portrait	Name (Birth–Death)	Term of office		Political party	Cabinet	Assembly (Election)
1		Gábor Vajna (1891–1946)	16 October 1944	28 March 1945	NYKP	Szálasi; NYKP–MMP	—

==== Soviet-backed provisional governments (1944–1946) ====
Parties NPP MKP

No.	Portrait	Name (Birth–Death)	Term of office		Political party	Cabinet	Assembly (Election)
1		Ferenc Erdei (1910–1971)	22 December 1944	15 November 1945	NPP	Provisional National Government; FKGP–MKP–MSZDP–NPP–PDP	INGY (1944)
2		Imre Nagy (1896–1958)	15 November 1945	1 February 1946	MKP	Tildy; FKGP–MKP–MSZDP–NPP	23 (1945)

=== Hungarian Republic (1946–1949) ===
Parties MKP-MDP

No.	Portrait	Name (Birth–Death)	Term of office		Political party	Cabinet	Assembly (Election)
1		Imre Nagy (1896–1958)	1 February 1946	20 March 1946	MKP	F. Nagy; FKGP–MKP–MSZDP–NPP	23 (1945)
2		László Rajk (1909–1949)	20 March 1946	31 May 1947	MKP	F. Nagy; FKGP–MKP–MSZDP–NPP	23 (1945)
2		László Rajk (1909–1949)	31 May 1947	14 June 1948	MKP	Dinnyés (MKP–MSZDP)→MDP–FKGP–NPP	23 (1945)
2		László Rajk (1909–1949)	31 May 1947	14 June 1948	MKP	Dinnyés (MKP–MSZDP)→MDP–FKGP–NPP	24 (1947)
2		László Rajk (1909–1949)	14 June 1948	5 August 1948	MDP	Dinnyés (MKP–MSZDP)→MDP–FKGP–NPP	24 (1947)
3		János Kádár (1912–1989)	5 August 1948	10 December 1948	MDP	Dinnyés (MKP–MSZDP)→MDP–FKGP–NPP	24 (1947)
3		János Kádár (1912–1989)	10 December 1948	20 August 1949	MDP	Dobi; MDP–FKGP–NPP	24 (1947)
3		János Kádár (1912–1989)	10 December 1948	20 August 1949	MDP	Dobi; MDP–FKGP–NPP	25 (1949)

=== Hungarian People's Republic (1949–1989) ===
Parties MDP-MSZMP MSZP

No.	Portrait	Name (Birth–Death)	Term of office		Political party	Cabinet	Assembly (Election)
1		János Kádár (1912–1989)	20 August 1949	23 June 1950	MDP	Dobi; MDP	25 (1949)
2		Sándor Zöld (1913–1951)	23 June 1950	20 April 1951	MDP	Dobi; MDP	25 (1949)
3		Árpád Házi (1908–1970)	20 April 1951	14 August 1952	MDP	Dobi; MDP	25 (1949)
3		Árpád Házi (1908–1970)	14 August 1952	14 November 1952	MDP	Rákosi; MDP	25 (1949)
4		József Györe (1902–1985)	14 November 1952	4 July 1953	MDP	Rákosi; MDP	25 (1949)
5		Ernő Gerő (1898–1980)	4 July 1953	6 June 1954	MDP	I. Nagy I MDP	26 (1953)
6		László Piros (1917–2006)	6 June 1954	18 April 1955	MDP	I. Nagy I MDP	26 (1953)
6		László Piros (1917–2006)	18 April 1955	24 October 1956	MDP	Hegedüs; MDP	26 (1953)
6		László Piros (1917–2006)	24 October 1956	27 October 1956	MDP	I. Nagy II; MDP/MSZMP–FKGP	26 (1953)
7		Ferenc Münnich (1886–1967)	27 October 1956	3 November 1956	MDP	I. Nagy II; MDP/MSZMP–FKGP	26 (1953)
8		Béla Biszku (1921–2016)	1 March 1957	28 January 1958	MSZMP	Kádár I MSZMP	26 (1953)
8		Béla Biszku (1921–2016)	28 January 1958	13 September 1961	MSZMP	Münnich; MSZMP	26 (1953)
8		Béla Biszku (1921–2016)	28 January 1958	13 September 1961	MSZMP	Münnich; MSZMP	27 (1958)
9		János Pap (1925–1994)	13 September 1961	7 December 1963	MSZMP	Kádár II; MSZMP	27 (1958)
9		János Pap (1925–1994)	13 September 1961	7 December 1963	MSZMP	Kádár II; MSZMP	28 (1963)
10		András Benkei (1923–1991)	7 December 1963	30 June 1965	MSZMP	Kádár II; MSZMP	28 (1963)
10		András Benkei (1923–1991)	30 June 1965	17 April 1967	MSZMP	Kállai; MSZMP	28 (1963)
10		András Benkei (1923–1991)	17 April 1967	15 May 1975	MSZMP	Fock; MSZMP	29 (1967)
10		András Benkei (1923–1991)	17 April 1967	15 May 1975	MSZMP	Fock; MSZMP	30 (1971)
10		András Benkei (1923–1991)	15 May 1975	27 June 1980	MSZMP	Lázár; MSZMP	30 (1971)
10		András Benkei (1923–1991)	15 May 1975	27 June 1980	MSZMP	Lázár; MSZMP	31 (1975)
10		András Benkei (1923–1991)	15 May 1975	27 June 1980	MSZMP	Lázár; MSZMP	32 (1980)
11		István Horváth (born 1935)	27 June 1980	29 March 1985	MSZMP	Lázár; MSZMP	32 (1980)
12		János Kamara (1927–2000)	29 March 1985	25 June 1987	MSZMP	Lázár; MSZMP	32 (1980)
12		János Kamara (1927–2000)	29 March 1985	25 June 1987	MSZMP	Lázár; MSZMP	33 (1985)
12		János Kamara (1927–2000)	25 June 1987	16 December 1987	MSZMP	Grósz; MSZMP	33 (1985)
(11)		István Horváth (born 1935)	16 December 1987	24 November 1988	MSZMP	Grósz; MSZMP	33 (1985)
(11)		István Horváth (born 1935)	24 November 1988	7 October 1989	MSZMP	Németh (MSZMP)→MSZP	33 (1985)
(11)		István Horváth (born 1935)	7 October 1989	23 October 1989	MSZP	Németh (MSZMP)→MSZP	33 (1985)

=== Hungarian Republic (1989–2006) ===
Parties MSZP MDF SZDSZ Independent

No.	Portrait	Name (Birth–Death)	Term of office		Political party	Cabinet	Assembly (Election)
—		István Horváth (born 1935) provisional	23 October 1989	23 January 1990	MSZP	Németh; MSZP	—
—		Zoltán Gál (born 1940) provisional	23 January 1990	23 May 1990	MSZP	Németh; MSZP	—
1		Balázs Horváth (1942–2006)	23 May 1990	21 December 1990	MDF	Antall; MDF–FKGP–KDNP	34 (1990)
2		Péter Boross (born 1928)	21 December 1990	12 December 1993	MDF	Antall; MDF–FKGP–KDNP	34 (1990)
2		Péter Boross (born 1928)	13 December 1993	21 December 1993	MDF	Boross; MDF–EKGP–KDNP	34 (1990)
3		Imre Kónya (born 1947)	21 December 1993	15 July 1994	MDF	Boross; MDF–EKGP–KDNP	34 (1990)
4		Gábor Kuncze (born 1950)	15 July 1994	8 July 1998	SZDSZ	Horn; MSZP–SZDSZ	35 (1994)
5		Sándor Pintér (born 1948); 1st term	8 July 1998	27 May 2002	Independent	Orbán I Fidesz–FKGP–MDF	36 (1998)
6		Mónika Lamperth (born 1957)	27 May 2002	4 October 2004	MSZP	Medgyessy; MSZP–SZDSZ	37 (2002)
6		Mónika Lamperth (born 1957)	4 October 2004	9 June 2006	MSZP	Gyurcsány I MSZP–SZDSZ	37 (2002)

== Ministers of Local Government (2006–2010) ==
=== Hungarian Republic (2006–2010) ===
Parties MSZP Association for Somogy Independent

No.	Portrait	Name (Birth–Death)	Term of office		Political party	Cabinet	Assembly (Election)
1		Mónika Lamperth (born 1957)	9 June 2006	30 June 2007	MSZP	Gyurcsány II; MSZP–SZDSZ	38 (2006)
2		Gordon Bajnai (born 1968)	30 June 2007	30 April 2008	Independent	Gyurcsány II; MSZP–SZDSZ	38 (2006)
3		István Gyenesei (1948–2024)	30 April 2008	14 April 2009	Association for Somogy	Gyurcsány II; MSZP–SZDSZ	38 (2006)
4		Zoltán Varga (born 1952)	14 April 2009	29 May 2010	MSZP	Bajnai; MSZP	38 (2006)

== Ministers of Interior (2010–present) ==
=== Hungarian Republic / Hungary (2010–present) ===
Parties TISZA Independent

No.	Portrait	Name (Birth–Death)	Term of office		Political party	Cabinet	Assembly (Election)
1		Sándor Pintér (born 1948); 2nd term	29 May 2010	6 June 2014	Independent	Orbán II; Fidesz–KDNP	39 (2010)
1		Sándor Pintér (born 1948); 2nd term	6 June 2014	18 May 2018	Independent	Orbán III; Fidesz–KDNP	40 (2014)
1		Sándor Pintér (born 1948); 2nd term	18 May 2018	24 May 2022	Independent	Orbán IV; Fidesz–KDNP	41 (2018)
1		Sándor Pintér (born 1948); 2nd term	24 May 2022	12 May 2026	Independent	Orbán V Fidesz–KDNP	42 (2022)
2		Gábor Pósfai (born 1982)	13 May 2026	Incumbent	TISZA	Magyar; TISZA	43 (2026)

== See also ==
- List of heads of state of Hungary
- List of prime ministers of Hungary
- Politics of Hungary

Cabinet ministers

- Minister of Agriculture (Hungary)
- Minister of Civilian Intelligence Services (Hungary)
- Minister of Croatian Affairs of Hungary
- Minister of Defence (Hungary)
- Minister of Education (Hungary)
- Minister of Finance (Hungary)
- Minister of Foreign Affairs (Hungary)
- Minister of Justice (Hungary)
- Minister of Public Works and Transport (Hungary)
