= Patriotic People's Front =

Patriotic People's Front Hazafias Népfront
- Founded: May 1944
- Dissolved: June 1990
- Succeeded by: Patriotic Electoral Coalition
- Colors: Red

The Patriotic People's Front (Hungarian: Hazafias Népfront, HNF) was a Hungarian political resistance movement during World War II which later became an alliance of political parties in the Hungarian People's Republic. In the latter role, it was dominated by the Communist Party—known as the Hungarian Working People's Party (MDP) between 1948 and 1956, and the Hungarian Socialist Workers' Party (MSzMP) from 1956 until its dissolution in 1989. For most of the last 40 years of its existence, it was de facto the only legally permitted political organization in Hungary.

== History ==
The Hungarian Front (Magyar Front) was founded by the Hungarian Communist Party (then briefly known as the Peace Party) as a resistance movement against the occupation of Hungary by Nazi German forces during World War II and included the Social Democratic Party (MSZDP), the Independent Smallholders' Party (FKgP) and the National Peasant Party (NPP). The Hungarian Front was replaced by the Hungarian National Independence Front (Magyar Nemzeti Függetlenségi Front, MNFF) on 2 December 1944 which also included the Civic Democratic Party (PDP).

On 1 February 1949, the MNFF become the Hungarian Independence People's Front (MFN), a popular front like in other Communist countries. By this time, the Front was dominated by the MDP (as the Communist Party had been renamed following a merger with the Social Democrats). The non-Communist parties in the Front had been taken over by fellow travellers who turned their parties into loyal partners of the MDP. As such, the MFN took on the same character as similar groupings in the emerging Soviet bloc. The non-Communist members became subservient to the MDP, and had to accept the MDP's "leading role" as a condition of their continued existence.

Under these circumstances, voters were presented with a single list from the MFN at the 1949 elections. The Communist-dominated legislature chosen at this election enacted a new, Soviet-style Constitution, which formally marked the onset of out-and-out Communist rule in Hungary. Elections were held under similar conditions in 1953.

Under Imre Nagy (22–24 October 1954), the MFN was reorganised as the Patriotic People's Front (HNF). During the Hungarian Revolution of 1956, the MSzMP replaced the MDP as the dominant force in the HNF.

Under the somewhat more moderate goulash Communism of János Kádár, the HNF still had near-complete control over the electoral system. As such, at all elections from 1958 to 1985, voters were presented with a single list of HNF candidates.

The Constitution charged the HNF with leading the nation in "complete building up of socialism, for the solution of political, economic, and cultural tasks." While more than one candidate could stand in at least some constituencies after 1966, all prospective candidates had to accept the HNF program to be eligible. The MSzMP used the HNF to actively mobilize against candidates it deemed unacceptable. This made it extremely difficult for independent candidates to get on the ballot. Through the HNF, the MSzMP was able to effectively predetermine the composition of the legislature.

In about 1990, the HNF became the Patriotic Electoral Coalition.

== Electoral history ==
=== National Assembly elections ===
Election	Votes	%	Seats	+/–	Position	Government
Hungarian Independence People's Front
1949	5,478,515	97.1%	402 / 402	▲402	▲1st	Won all seats
1953	6,256,653	99.0%	298 / 298	▼104	1st	Sole legal coalition
Patriotic People's Front
1958	6,431,832	99.6%	338 / 338	▲40	1st	Sole legal coalition
1963	6,813,058	98.9%	340 / 340	▲2	1st	Sole legal coalition
1967	7,086,596	99.7%	349 / 349	▲9	1st	Sole legal coalition
1971	7,189,125	99.0%	352 / 352	▲3	1st	Sole legal coalition
1975		99.6%	352 / 352	Steady	1st	Sole legal coalition
1980	7,462,593	99.3%	352 / 352	Steady	1st	Sole legal coalition
1985	7,145,601	99.1%	387 / 387	▲35	1st	Sole legal coalition
