= 1958 Hungarian parliamentary election =

← 1953	16 November 1958	1963 →

All 338 seats in the National Assembly
- Turnout: 98.38%
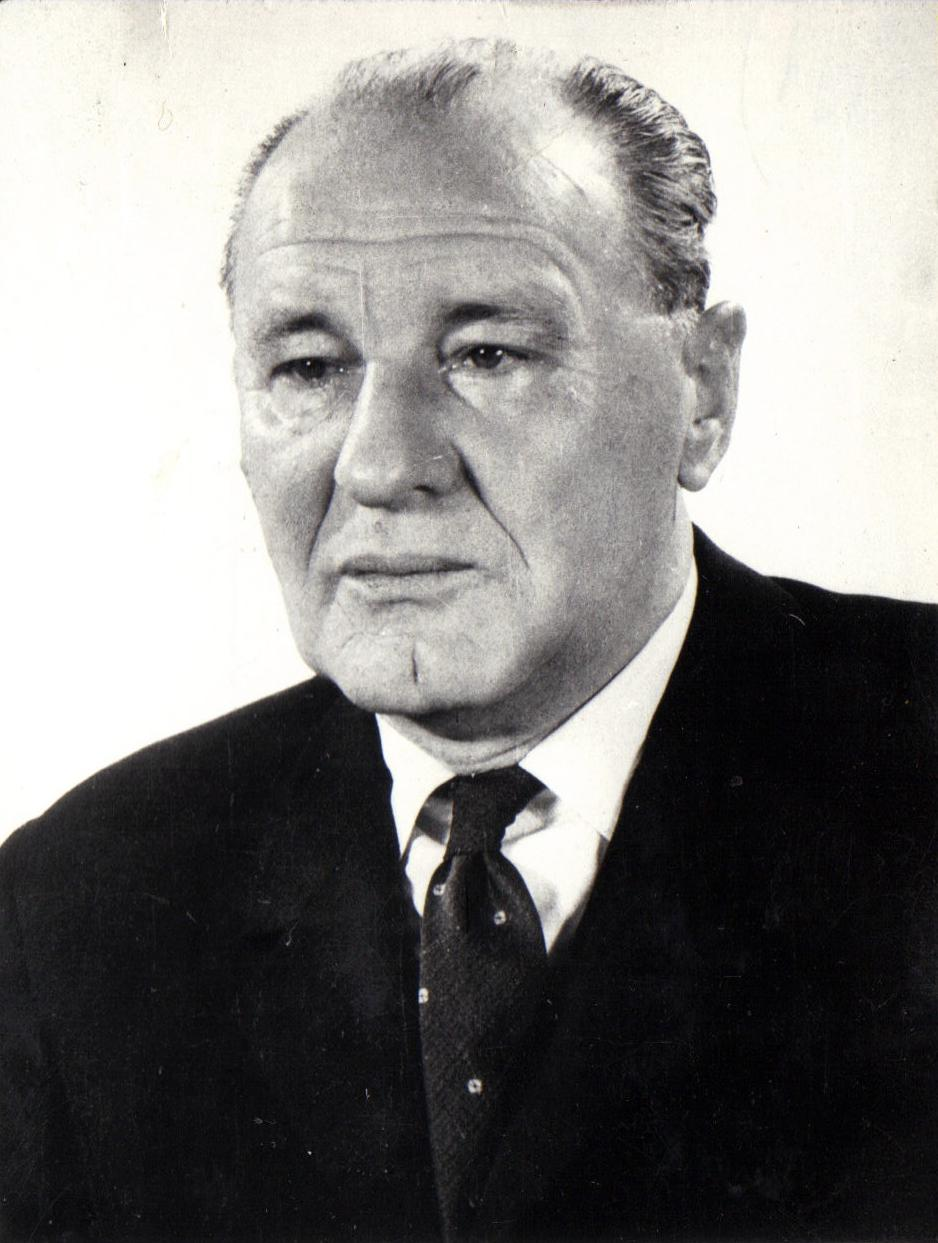

	First party	Second party
Leader	János Kádár	–
Party	MSZMP	Independents
Alliance	HNF	HNF
Leader since	25 October 1956
Seats won	276	62
Seat change	▲70	▼30

Parliamentary elections were held in Hungary on 16 November 1958. They were the first elections held after the Hungarian Revolution of 1956. The Communist Hungarian Working People's Party had been reorganized as the Hungarian Socialist Workers' Party, under the leadership of a more moderate Communist, János Kádár. However, as was the case during the era of Mátyás Rákosi, voters were presented with a single list of Communists and pro-Communist independents. The Socialist Workers' Party won 276 of the 338 seats, with the remaining 62 going to independents.

== Results ==
Party or alliance		Votes	%	Seats	+/–
Patriotic People's Front	Hungarian Socialist Workers' Party	6,431,832	99.56	276	+70
Patriotic People's Front	Independents	6,431,832	99.56	62	–30
Against		28,651	0.44	–	–
Total		6,460,483	100.00	338	+40
Valid votes		6,460,483	99.49		
Invalid/blank votes		33,197	0.51		
Total votes		6,493,680	100.00		
Registered voters/turnout		6,600,686	98.38		
Source: Nohlen & Stöver

== The activity of the parliament ==
The new parliament created the first unified civil code in Hungary in 1959, which strengthened legal certainty and remained in force until 2013. Exploration and mining were regulated under exclusive state supervision in 1960. General conscription was introduced and the tasks of the army were defined. The second five-year plan with the economic goals was adopted in 1961. The new education law required that schools prepare students for work, with a focus on natural sciences and vocational training. A new unified criminal code was adopted, which severely punished acts classified as anti-state. The expropriation of agricultural land for industrial and residential purposes was prohibited. Forest and wildlife management were regulated in order to preserve ecological balance. The legal framework for electricity supply was created in 1962, which was under exclusive state control.
