= 1971 Hungarian parliamentary election =

← 1967	25 April 1971	1975 →

All 352 seats in the National Assembly
- Turnout: 98.69%
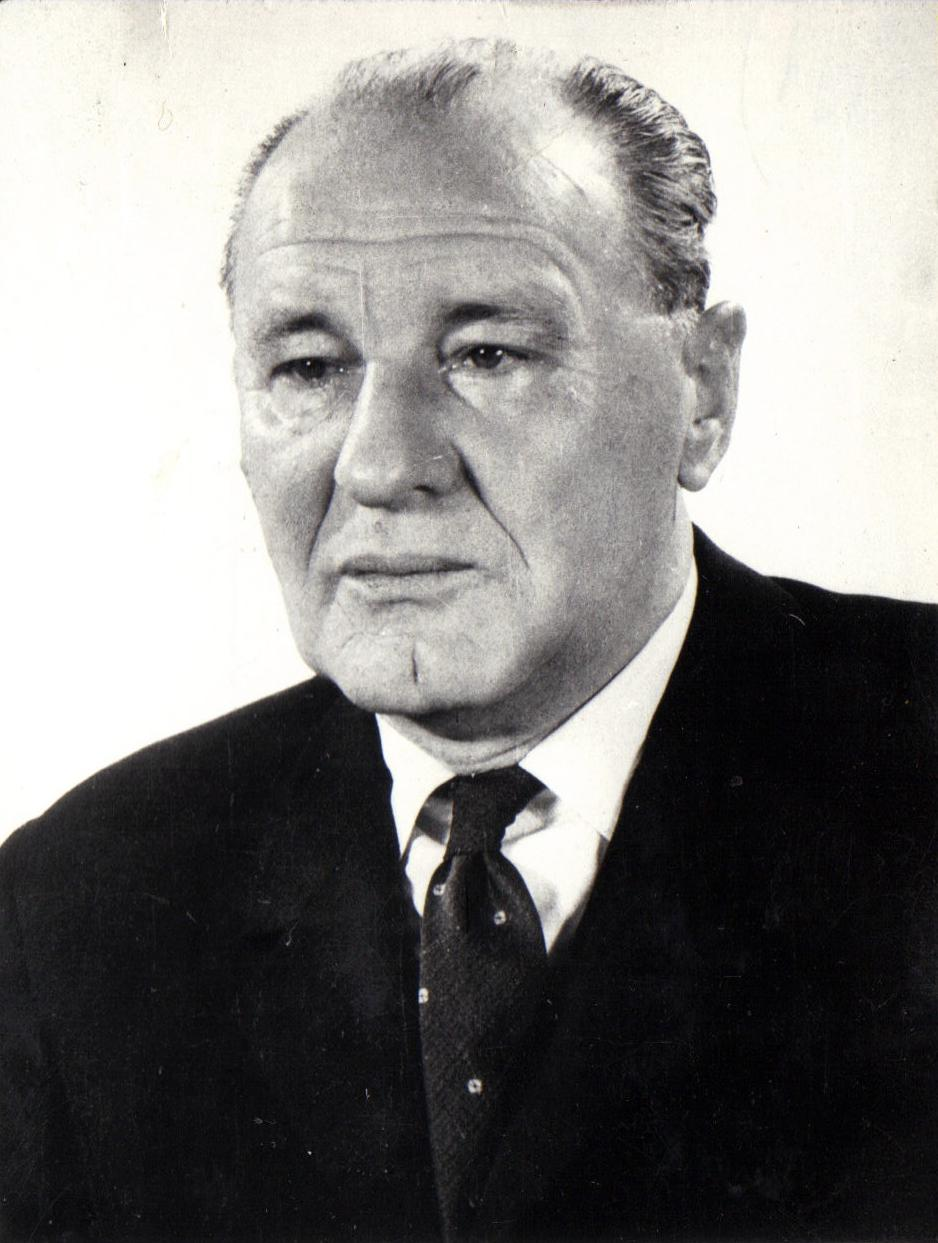

	First party	Second party
Leader	János Kádár	–
Party	MSZMP	Independents
Alliance	HNF	HNF
Seats won	224	128
Seat change	▼35	▲38

Parliamentary elections were held in Hungary on 25 April 1971. The Hungarian Socialist Workers' Party was the only party to contest the elections, and won 224 of the 352 seats, with the remaining 128 going to independents selected by the party.

All prospective candidates had to accept the program of the Patriotic People's Front, which was dominated by the HSWP. While it was possible for more than one candidate to run in a constituency, only 49 of the 352 constituencies had more than one candidate.

== Results ==
Party or alliance		Votes	%	Seats	+/–
Patriotic People's Front	Hungarian Socialist Workers' Party	7,189,125	99.05	224	–35
Patriotic People's Front	Independents	7,189,125	99.05	128	+38
Against		68,996	0.95	–	–
Total		7,258,121	100.00	352	+3
Valid votes		7,258,121	98.95		
Invalid/blank votes		76,797	1.05		
Total votes		7,334,918	100.00		
Registered voters/turnout		7,432,420	98.69		
Source: Nohlen & Stöver

== The activity of the parliament ==
The new parliament re-regulated the operation of economic cooperatives in 1971. The Health Act stipulated that providing care was the state's responsibility and that citizens had a duty to take care of their own health and that of their environment. The method of marriage was re-regulated in 1974, the equality of spouses and the rights of children were ensured, and the legal framework of guardianship was clarified. Before the next election modified the term of the next parliament from 4 to 5 years.
