= Hungarian National Council =

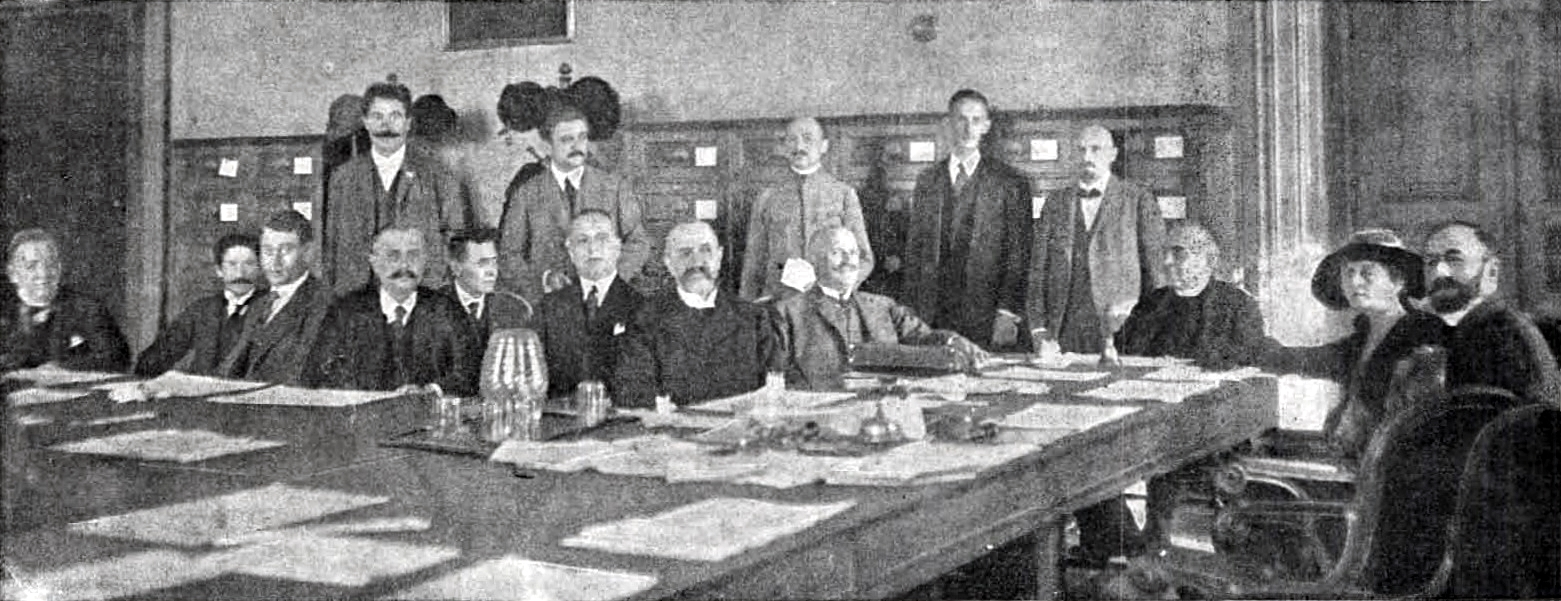
Hungarian National Council (november 1918)

The Hungarian National Council (Hungarian: Magyar Nemzeti Tanács) was an institution from the time of transition from the Kingdom of Hungary (part of Austria-Hungary) to the People's Republic in 1918. At the congress of the Hungarian Social Democratic Party (MSZDP) in October 1918 called for the Socialist Left József Pogány minority to its own policy, which should be based on the emerging workers 'and soldiers' councils. In contrast prevailed Zsigmond Kunfi in the MSZDP that the liberal left "48" party of Count Mihály Károlyi and the bourgeois radical party of Oszkár Jászi was entered into an alliance. These three parties formed on 25 October, the Hungarian National Council (see also Aster Revolution).

The National Council called for a 12-point program, especially the immediate termination of the war, the Independence from Vienna, the recognition of minority rights in the "Lands of the Crown of Saint Stephen" a comprehensive agrarian reform, assembly, association and freedom of expression and universal, equal, and full women's suffrage.

Emperor and King Charles I (IV) dismissed the previous prime minister, Sándor Wekerle in late October and temporarily appointed Count János Hadik to finally the red Count Mihály Károlyi to appoint as premier. On 16 November 1918 were the deputies of the Hungarian Parliament, which dated from before the war, the supreme power in the Károlyi government, which then proclaimed the Hungarian Democratic Republic.

It was replaced by the Hungarian Soviet Republic led by Béla Kun, from 21 March to 6 August 1919 had stock, and on 1 March 1920, the Kingdom of Hungary was re-established, that under Miklós Horthy.

== Bibliography ==
- András Siklós: Magyarország 1918/1919 – Események, képek, dokumentumok; Kossuth Könyvkiadó – Magyar Helikon Rt., 1978. ISBN 963-09-1097-7 (ungar.)
- István György Tóth (ed.): Geschichte Ungarns. Budapest, 2005. ISBN 963-13-5268-4
- Iván Völgyes (ed.): Hungary in Revolution, 1918-19. Nine Essays. Univ. of Nebraska Press, Lincoln, 1971.
