= 1980 Hungarian parliamentary election =

- 8 June 1980

All 352 seats in the National Assembly
- Turnout: 97.03%
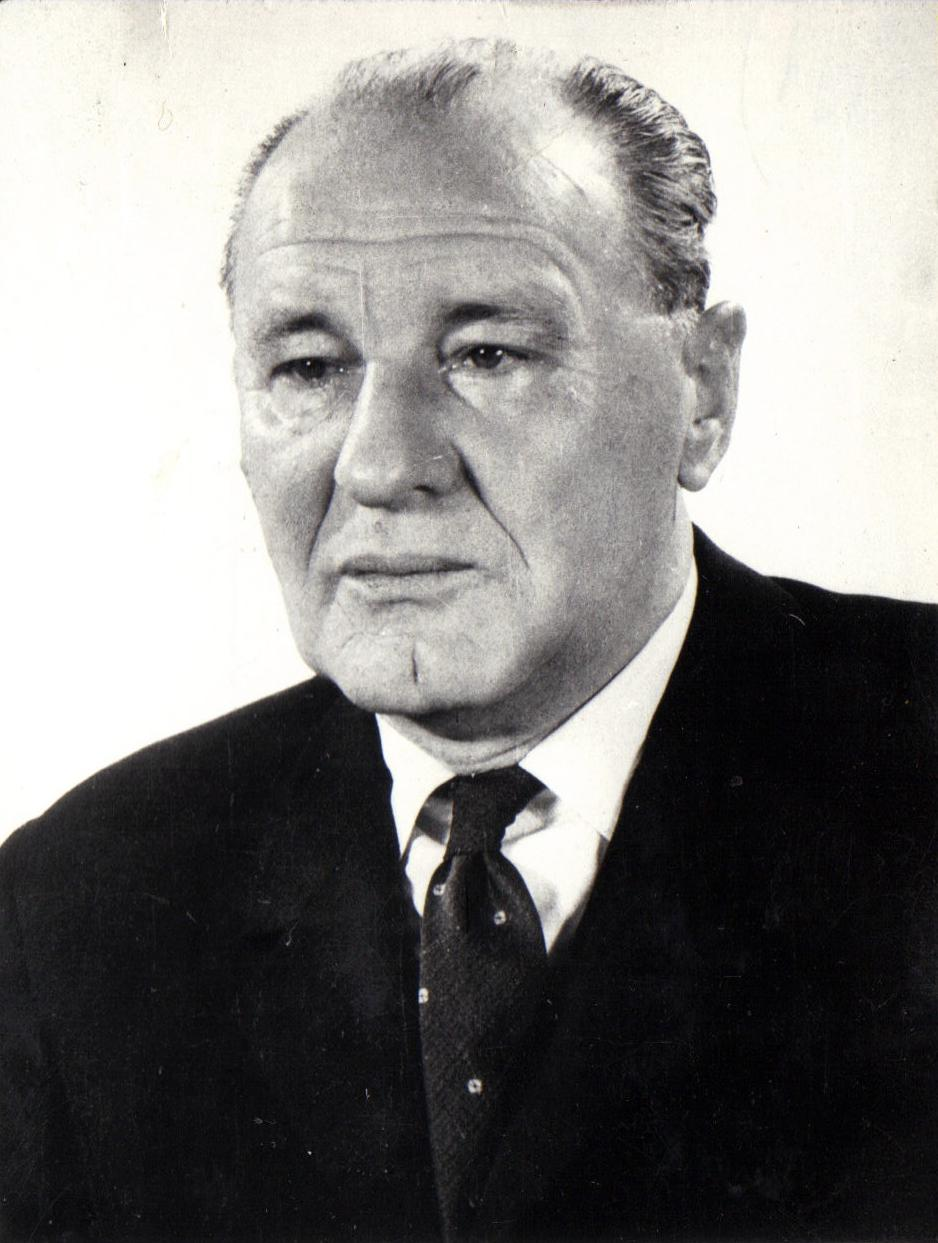

	First party	Second party
Leader	János Kádár	–
Party	MSZMP	Independents
Alliance	HNF	HNF
Seats won	252	100
Seat change	▲37	▼37

Parliamentary elections were held in Hungary on 8 June 1980. The Hungarian Socialist Workers' Party was the only party to contest the elections, and won 252 of the 352 seats, with the remaining 100 going to independents selected by the party.

All prospective candidates had to accept the program of the Patriotic People's Front, which was dominated by the HSWP. While it was possible for more than one candidate to run in a constituency, only 15 of the 352 constituencies had more than one candidate.

== Results ==
Party or alliance		Votes	%	Seats	+/–
Patriotic People's Front	Hungarian Socialist Workers' Party	7,462,593	99.28	252	+37
Patriotic People's Front	Independents	7,462,593	99.28	100	–37
Against		54,070	0.72	–	–
Total		7,516,663	100.00	352	0
Valid votes		7,516,663	99.20		
Invalid/blank votes		60,738	0.80		
Total votes		7,577,401	100.00		
Registered voters/turnout		7,809,407	97.03		
Source: Nohlen & Stöver

== The activity of the parliament ==
The new Parliament passed a law on the peaceful use of nuclear energy in 1980, which created the legal prerequisites for the opening of the Paks Nuclear Power Plant in 1982. The sixth five-year plan was adopted, based on the economic goals declared at the 12th Congress of the Hungarian Socialist Workers' Party. The constitution and the election rules were amended in 1983, allowing for multiple candidates in every single-member district and the recall of elected representatives.
