= 1985 Hungarian parliamentary election =

- 8 June 1985

All 387 seats in the National Assembly
- Turnout: 94.02%
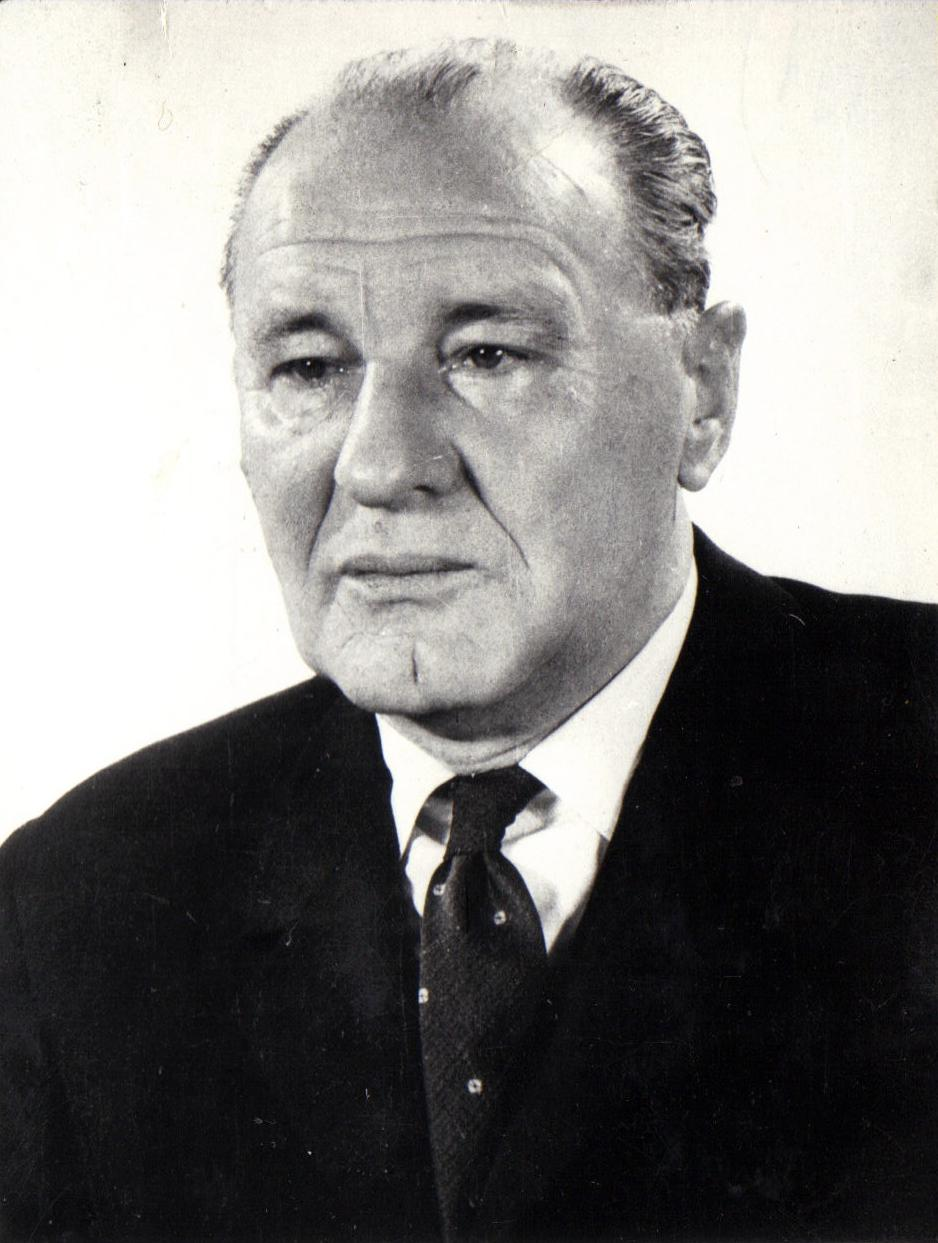

| | First party | Second party |
|---|---|---|
| Leader | János Kádár | – |
| Party | MSZMP | Independents |
| Alliance | HNF | HNF |
| Leader since | 25 October 1956 | – |
| Seats won | 288 | 98 |
| Seat change | ▲36 | ▼2 |

Parliamentary elections were held in Hungary on 8 June 1985. The Patriotic People's Front, dominated by the Communist Hungarian Socialist Workers' Party, was the only organisation allowed to contest the election. All prospective candidates had to accept the Front's program in order to be eligible.

The MSZMP, the only legal political party in the country, won 288 of the 387 seats, with 98 of the remaining 99 going to independents selected by the party. The one other seat remained unfilled until the following year. These were the first elections that feature genuine, albeit limited, competition and were considered semi-free before the fully free and multi-partisan elections took place in 1990.

== Electoral system ==
The elections took place under new rules enacted in 1983 that allowed for wider participation in the electoral process. In addition to the 352 single-member constituencies, a further 35 MPs were elected unopposed via a national list. According to Politburo member Mihaly Korom, this was necessary in order to ensure the "representation of leading personalities" whose activities extended "beyond the boundaries of their electoral districts." Voters who were away from home on election day could only vote on the national list, which had around 160,000 extra voters compared to the single-member constituencies.

There had to be at least two candidates in the single-member constituencies, which was achieved everywhere except Keszthely, where one candidate withdrew his nomination. A by-election was later held for the seat in the spring of 1986. In 54 constituencies, mainly in urban areas, at least three and as many as four candidates appeared on the ballot.

== Results ==
| Party | SMCs | | National list | | Seats | +/– |
| Party | Votes | % | Votes | % | Seats | +/– |
|---|---|---|---|---|---|---|
| Hungarian Socialist Workers' Party | 6,636,685 | 98.81 | 7,145,601 | 99.10 | 288 | +36 |
| Independents | 6,636,685 | 98.81 | 7,145,601 | 99.10 | 98 | –2 |
| Vacant | | | | | 1 | – |
| Against | 79,702 | 1.19 | 64,894 | 0.90 | – | – |
| Total | 6,716,387 | 100.00 | 7,210,495 | 100.00 | 387 | +35 |
| Valid votes | 6,716,387 | 94.56 | 7,210,495 | 99.24 | | |
| Invalid/blank votes | 386,759 | 5.44 | 55,420 | 0.76 | | |
| Total votes | 7,103,146 | 100.00 | 7,265,915 | 100.00 | | |
| Registered voters/turnout | 7,586,480 | 93.63 | 7,728,208 | 94.02 | | |
Source: Nohlen & Stöver, IPU, Other

== The activity of the parliament ==
The parliamentary term was determined by the last years of the Cold War, the impending defeat of the Soviet Union created a gradual opening towards a market economy. Finally, during the 1989 revolution, the political changes also took place. The seventh and final five-year plan was adopted in 1985, the economic goals of which were determined by the 13th Congress of the Hungarian Socialist Workers' Party. The education system was modernized and schools were given greater autonomy. The ownership, use, circulation and protection of agricultural land were comprehensively regulated. VAT was introduced and personal income tax. The power of the Presidential Council were limited and the primary legislative role of the National Assembly was strengthened. The Kft, Rt, Bt and Kkt corporate forms were created and the corporate profit tax was introduced. FDI was made possible.

=== End of communism in Hungary ===
The establishment of associations, political parties and civil society organisations became free, the holding of peaceful demonstrations, marches and events, unrestricted travel and emigration abroad. Legal strikes became possible and the Workers' Militia was abolished. The Third Republic, the Constitutional Court, the State Audit Office (Hungary) was established. The possibility of reviewing the judgments related to the 1956 revolution, and the possibility of referendums was created. The Presidential Council was abolished, replaced by the President of the Republic, who is elected by the National Assembly by secret ballot. The system of parliamentary elections was changed: it became free and multi-party, the number of single-member district was reduced, and the multi-member constituencies and the national compensation list were introduced.
