= Hungarian Socialist Workers' Party =

Ruling party of Hungary from 1956 to 1989

Hungarian Socialist Workers' Party Magyar Szocialista Munkáspárt
- General Secretary: János Kádár (first); Károly Grósz (second); Rezső Nyers (third and last)
- Founded: 31 October 1956
- Dissolved: 7 October 1989
- Preceded by: Hungarian Working People's Party
- Succeeded by: Hungarian Socialist Party; Hungarian Socialist Workers' Party (1989)
- Headquarters: Budapest, Hungarian People's Republic
- Newspaper: Népszabadság
- Youth wing: Hungarian Young Communist League
- Armed wing: Hungarian People's Army; Workers' Militia
- Membership: ▲5,714,111 (1978)
- Ideology: Communism; Marxism–Leninism; Kádárism (Note: The party was committed to Marxism–Leninism throughout its existence, with Kádárism exerted as the dominant form of Marxism–Leninism after the Hungarian Revolution of 1956.)
- National affiliation: Patriotic People's Front
- Colours: Red
- National Assembly (1985): 288 / 387 (74%)

MSZMP propaganda leaflet. The caption reads: "Long live the unbreakable unity of our party and our people!"

The Hungarian Socialist Workers' Party (Magyar Szocialista Munkáspárt, pronounced [ˈmɒɟɒr ˈsot͡sijɒliʃtɒ ˈmuŋkaːʃpaːrt], MSZMP) was the ruling Marxist–Leninist party of the Hungarian People's Republic between 1956 and 1989. It was organised from elements of the Hungarian Working People's Party during the Hungarian Revolution of 1956, with János Kádár as general secretary. The party also controlled its armed forces, the Hungarian People's Army.

Like all other Eastern Bloc parties, the MSZMP was organized on the basis of democratic centralism, a principle conceived by Vladimir Lenin that entails democratic and open discussion of issues within the party followed by the requirement of total unity in upholding the agreed policies. The highest body within the MSZMP was the party Congress, which convened every five years. When the Congress was not in session, the Central Committee of the MSZMP was the highest body. Because the Central Committee met twice a year, most day-to-day duties and responsibilities were vested in the Politburo. The party leader was the de facto chairman of the Politburo and a de facto chief executive of Hungary. At various points he served as the prime minister in addition to being party leader.

== Overview ==
János Kádár announced the formation of the party via radio on 1 November 1956. The party supported the revolution, but turned against Imre Nagy's government after he denounced the Warsaw Pact. The party formed a 'Revolutionary Peasant-Worker Government' that took over the country, with Soviet support, on 4 November 1956.

Gradually, however, the new government instituted Goulash Communism, a somewhat more humane way of governing than had prevailed under Mátyás Rákosi. Under Kádár's mantra of "he who is not against us is with us," Hungarians generally had more freedom than their Eastern Bloc counterparts to go about their daily lives. For example, his government executed only 350 people after the 1956 revolution. The government also gave limited freedom to the workings of the market via the New Economic Mechanism, which led to the creation of a market socialist economy and a rise in living standards. However, it retained a monopoly of political power, and subjected the media to censorship that was fairly onerous by Western standards. The National Assembly, like its counterparts in the rest of the Soviet bloc, continued to rubber-stamp decisions already made by the MSZMP leadership. It was the dominant component of the Patriotic People's Front, a popular front that included some non-Communists. However, all prospective candidates had to accept the Front's program in order to stand. Indeed, Kádár and his close advisers used the Front to weed out candidates they deemed unacceptable.

Kádár retired on 22 May 1988 and was succeeded by Prime Minister Károly Grósz. However, Grósz soon found himself eclipsed by a group of radical reformers who favored establishing a market economy. On 28 January 1989, young Politburo member and minister of state Imre Pozsgay announced during an interview with the radio program 168 Hours that the Poliburo's historical sub-committee regarded the events of 1956 as a 'people's uprising'. This announcement, not approved in advance by the Politburo, provoked and catalyzed various developments within the party, and brought about sudden and ever-escalating changes that, within nine months, resulted in the ending of Communism in Hungary and the dissolution of the MSZMP.

By the summer of 1989, the MSZMP was no longer a Marxist–Leninist party, and the radical reformers, led by Prime Minister Miklós Németh, Foreign Minister Gyula Horn, Rezső Nyers, and Pozsgay, had taken over the party machinery. On 26 June 1989, the Central Committee was renamed the Political Executive Committee, and the Politburo was replaced by a four-man collective presidency chaired by Nyers. Although Grósz remained general secretary, Nyers now outranked him. On 7 October 1989 the MSZMP was dissolved and refounded as the Hungarian Socialist Party, a Western-style social democratic party. Two weeks later, the National Assembly approved numerous amendments to the constitution that purged it of its Marxist–Leninist character, ending one-party rule in Hungary.

A small Communist faction, centred on Károly Grósz, opposed these reforms and broke away to form the Hungarian Communist Workers' Party on 17 December 1989.

== Leaders of the Hungarian Socialist Workers' Party ==
=== First/General Secretaries ===
No.	Portrait	Name (Birth–Death)	Term of office			Position(s)	Notes
No.	Portrait	Name (Birth–Death)	Took office	Left office	Duration	Position(s)	Notes
1		János Kádár (1912–1989)	1 November 1956 (Note: Previously First Secretary of the disbanded Hungarian Working People's Party 25–30 October 1956.)	22 May 1988 (Note: thereafter titular Party President until May 1989.)	31 years, 203 days	First Secretary	Also Prime Minister (1956–1958, 1961–1965)
1		János Kádár (1912–1989)	1 November 1956	22 May 1988	31 years, 203 days	General Secretary (from 28 March 1985)	Also Prime Minister (1956–1958, 1961–1965)
2		Károly Grósz (1930–1996)	22 May 1988	26 June 1989 (Note: Continued as general secretary until 7 October 1989 but outranked by Rezső Nyers, the Chairman of the 4-man Presidency of the newly created Political Executive Committee which replaced the Politburo after 26 June 1989.)	1 year, 35 days	General Secretary (from 28 March 1985)	Also Prime Minister (1987–1988)

=== Chairman of the Presidency of the Political Executive Committee ===
No.	Portrait	Name (Birth–Death)	Term of office			Position(s)
No.	Portrait	Name (Birth–Death)	Took office	Left office	Duration	Position(s)
1		Rezső Nyers (1923–2018)	26 June 1989	7 October 1989	103 days	Party President (Note: While Grósz retained the title of General Secretary until 7 October, Nyers chaired the MSZMP's four-man presidency after the reorganization of the Party leadership on 26 June. This made him de facto chief executive of both the Party and the country after that date, a post he held for most of the summer of 1989.)

== Electoral history ==
=== National Assembly elections ===
Election	Party leader	Votes	%	Seats	+/–	Position	Government
1958	János Kádár	as part of Patriotic People's Front		276 / 338	▲70	▲1st	Sole legal party
1963	János Kádár	as part of Patriotic People's Front		252 / 298	▼24	1st	Sole legal party
1967	János Kádár	as part of Patriotic People's Front		259 / 349	▲7	1st	Sole legal party
1971	János Kádár	as part of Patriotic People's Front		224 / 352	▼35	1st	Sole legal party
1975	János Kádár	as part of Patriotic People's Front		215 / 352	▼9	1st	Sole legal party
1980	János Kádár	as part of Patriotic People's Front		252 / 352	▲37	1st	Sole legal party
1985	János Kádár	as part of Patriotic People's Front		288 / 387	▲36	1st	Sole legal party

== See also ==
- Gyula Horn
- Imre Pozsgay
- List of political parties in Hungary
- Miklós Németh
- Politics of Hungary
