= 1953 Hungarian parliamentary election =

- 17 May 1953

All 298 seats in the National Assembly
- Turnout: 97.98%
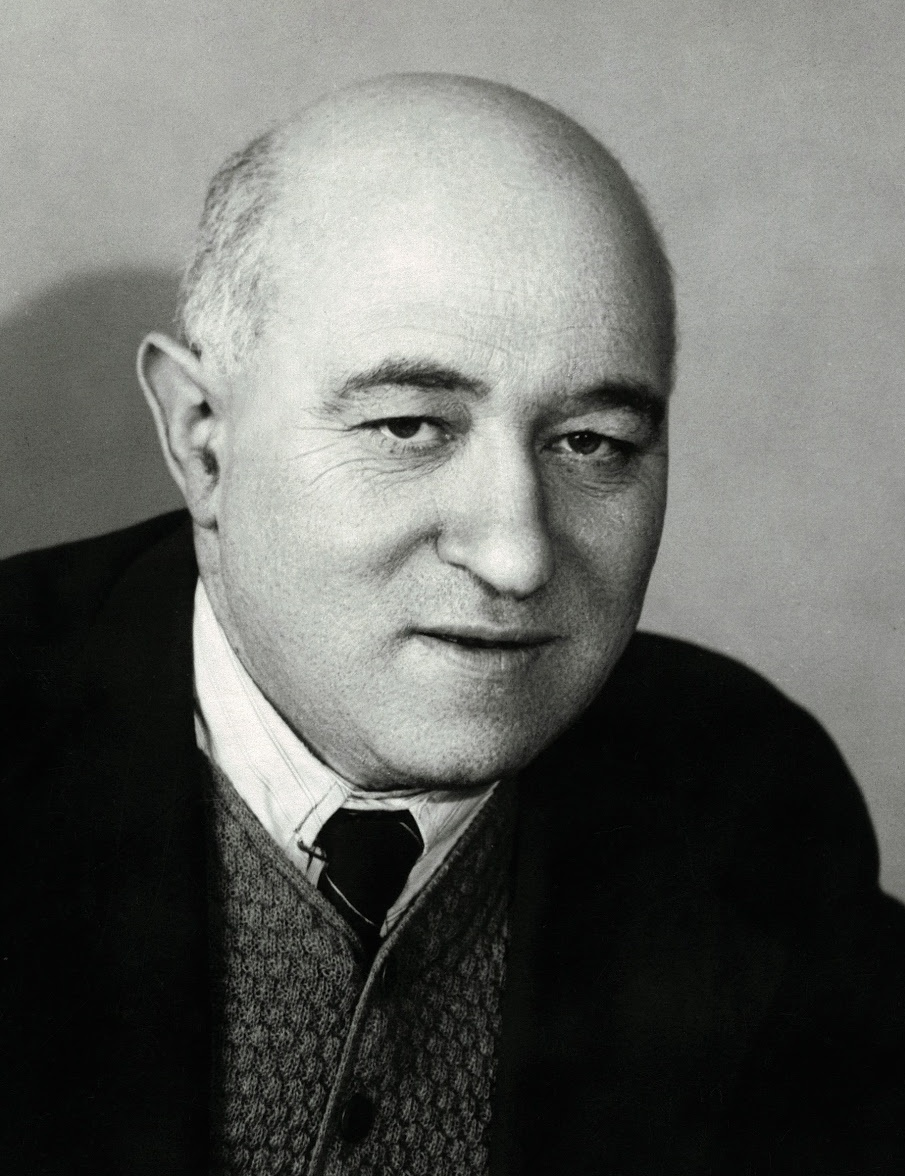

	First party	Second party
Leader	Mátyás Rákosi	–
Party	MDP	Independents
Alliance	MFN	MFN
Leader since	1 February 1949
Seats won	206	92
Seat change	▼79	▼25

Parliamentary elections were held in Hungary on 17 May 1953. As would be the case with all elections for the remainder of Communist rule, voters were presented with a single list from the Communist Hungarian Working People's Party, comprising Communists and pro-Communist independents. The Working People's Party won 206 of the 298 seats, with the remaining 92 going to independents.

== Results ==
Party or alliance		Votes	%	Seats	+/–
Hungarian Independence; People's Front	Hungarian Working People's Party	6,256,653	99.03	206	–79
Hungarian Independence; People's Front	Independents	6,256,653	99.03	92	–25
Against		61,257	0.97	–	–
Total		6,317,910	100.00	298	–104
Valid votes		6,317,910	99.17		
Invalid/blank votes		52,609	0.83		
Total votes		6,370,519	100.00		
Registered voters/turnout		6,501,869	97.98		
Source: Nohlen & Stöver

== The activity of the parliament ==
The new Parliament amended the election rules in such a way that the multi-member constituencies voting continued to operate. The lists were compiled by the committees of the Hungarian Independence People's Front from the persons elected at the nomination meetings. Candidates were elected if the majority voted in favor of the list. In order to help mothers working, the number of kindergartens was increased. The mandate of the Parliament was extended by two years, the coat of arms and flag of the country were modified. The possibilities of losing citizenship were regulated, and the need for state consent for marriage with foreigners was abolished. A three-year plan was adopted, including industrial development and an increase in the number of rural medical districts.
