= 1967 Hungarian parliamentary election =

- 19 March 1967

All 349 seats in the National Assembly
- Turnout: 98.83%
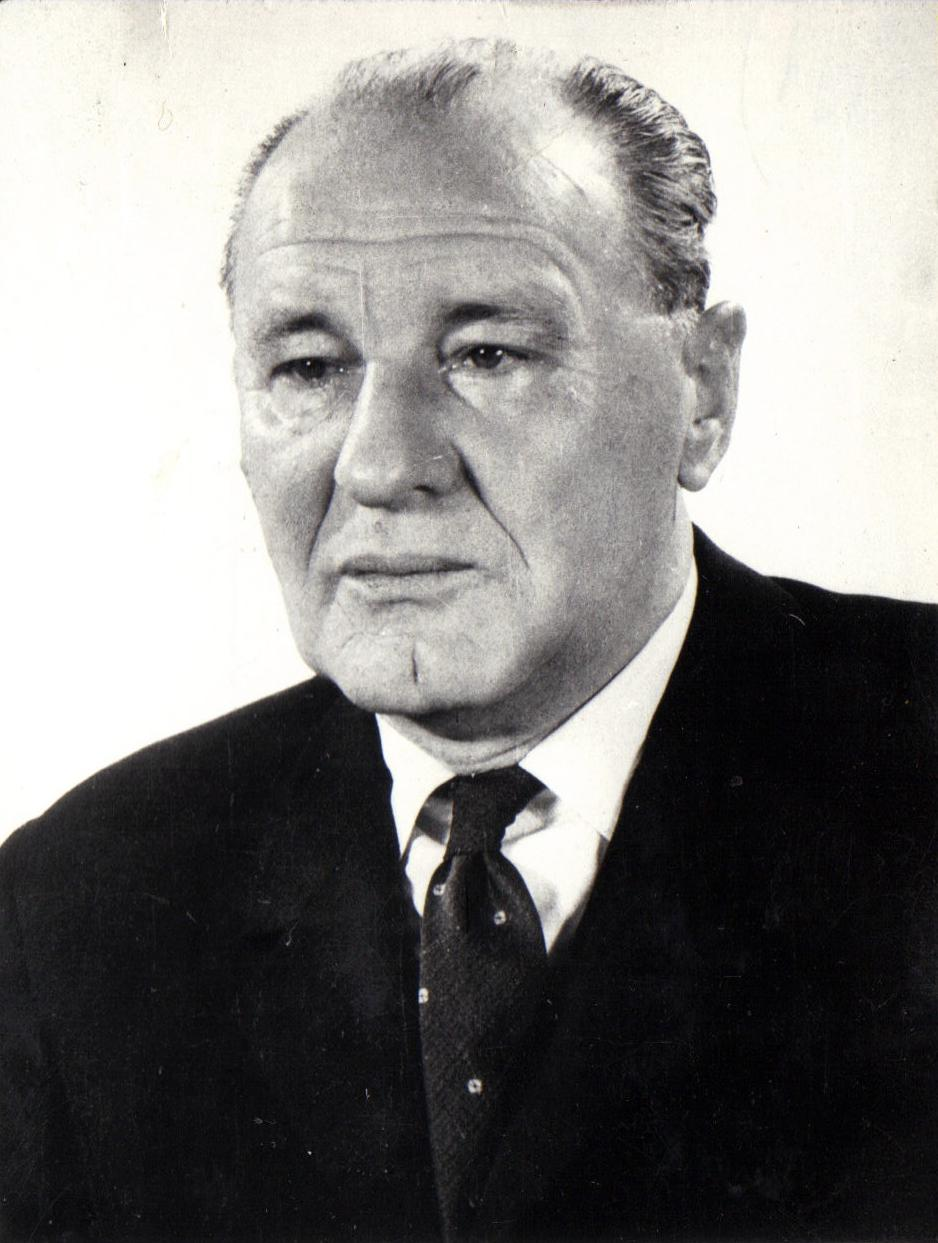

	First party	Second party
Leader	János Kádár	–
Party	MSZMP	Independents
Alliance	HNF	HNF
Seats won	259	90
Seat change	▲7	▲2

Parliamentary elections were held in Hungary on 19 March 1967. The Hungarian Socialist Workers' Party was the only party allowed to contest the elections, and won 259 of the 349 seats, with the remaining 90 going to independents selected by the party.

The elections were the first held under new electoral laws enacted in 1966 that made it possible for more than one candidate to run in a constituency. However, in order to be eligible, all prospective candidates had to accept the program of the Patriotic People's Front, which was dominated by the HSWP. Even under these new rules only nine of the 349 constituencies had more than one candidate.

== Results ==
Party or alliance		Votes	%	Seats	+/–
Patriotic People's Front	Hungarian Socialist Workers' Party	7,086,596	99.73	259	+7
Patriotic People's Front	Independents	7,086,596	99.73	90	+2
Against		19,113	0.27	–	–
Total		7,105,709	100.00	349	+9
Valid votes		7,105,709	99.64		
Invalid/blank votes		25,442	0.36		
Total votes		7,131,151	100.00		
Registered voters/turnout		7,215,408	98.83		
Source: Nohlen & Stöver

== The activity of the parliament ==
The parliament enacted a law regulating the rights and obligations of employees and employers in 1967. They reorganized the rights and obligations of members of agricultural production cooperatives and supported further collectivization. A law was enacted on the establishment, operation and closure of railways in 1968. Patent law, copyright protection of cultural and scientific works, and legal protection of trademarks and distinctive signs were introduced in 1969. Industrial and agricultural vocational training was adapted to the needs of the economy. Finally the fourth five-year plan was adopted, based on the economic goals declared at the 10th Congress of the Hungarian Socialist Workers' Party in 1970.
