= Hungarian Working People's Party =

Ruling party of Hungary (1948–1956)

Hungarian Working People's Party Magyar Dolgozók Pártja
- First leader: Mátyás Rákosi
- Last leader: János Kádár
- Founded: 12 June 1948
- Dissolved: 31 October 1956
- Merger of: Communist Party; Social Democratic Party; Peasant Party
- Succeeded by: MSZMP
- Newspaper: Szabad Nép
- Youth wing: Union of Working Youth
- Ideology: Communism; Marxism–Leninism (Note: The party was committed to Marxism–Leninism throughout its existence, with Stalinism exerted as the dominant form of Marxism–Leninism until 18 July 1956.)
- National affiliation: Patriotic People's Front
- International affiliation: Cominform (1948–1956)
- National Assembly (1953): 206 / 298 (69%)

Party flag

The Hungarian Working People's Party (Hungarian: Magyar Dolgozók Pártja, pronounced [ˈmɒɟɒr ˈdolɡozoːk ˈpaːrcɒ], abbr. MDP) was the ruling Marxist-Leninist party of Hungary from 1948 to 1956.

It was formed by a merger of the Hungarian Communist Party (MKP) and the Social Democratic Party of Hungary (MSZDP). However, the merger had actually occurred as a result of massive pressure brought to bear on the Social Democrats by both the Hungarian Communists, as well as the Soviet Union. The merger was almost entirely on Communist terms, and the few independent-minded Social Democrats who had not been sidelined by Communist salami tactics were pushed out in short order after the merger. This left the MDP as essentially the MKP under a new name.

Other minor legal Hungarian political parties were allowed to continue as independent coalition parties until late 1949. However, they were completely subservient to the MDP. It was the dominant force in the Hungarian Independence People's Front, a popular front that was effectively the only legal political organization.

Its leader was Mátyás Rákosi until 1956, then Ernő Gerő in the same year for three months, and eventually János Kádár until the party's dissolution.

During the Hungarian Revolution of 1956, the party was reorganized into the Hungarian Socialist Workers' Party (MSZMP) by a circle of communists around Kádár and Imre Nagy. The new government of Nagy assessed the uprising not as counter-revolutionary but as a "great, national and democratic event" and to dissolve the State Protection Authority (ÁVH). Hungary's declaration to become neutral and to exit the Warsaw Pact caused a second Soviet intervention on 4 November 1956. After 8 November 1956, the MSZMP, under Kádár's leadership, fully supported the Soviet Union.

Unification congress poster

== Leaders of the Hungarian Working People's Party ==
=== General/First Secretaries ===
No.	Portrait	Name (Birth–Death)	Term of office			Position(s)
No.	Portrait	Name (Birth–Death)	Took office	Left office	Duration	Position(s)
1		Mátyás Rákosi (1892–1971)	12 June 1948	18 July 1956	8 years, 36 days	General Secretary
1		Mátyás Rákosi (1892–1971)	12 June 1948	18 July 1956	8 years, 36 days	First Secretary (from 28 June 1953)
2		Ernő Gerő (1898–1980)	18 July 1956	25 October 1956	99 days	First Secretary (from 28 June 1953)
3		János Kádár (1912–1989)	25 October 1956	31 October 1956	6 days	First Secretary (from 28 June 1953)

=== Chairman ===
No.	Portrait	Name (Birth–Death)	Term of office			Position(s)
No.	Portrait	Name (Birth–Death)	Took office	Left office	Duration	Position(s)
1		Árpád Szakasits (1888–1965)	12 June 1948	24 April 1950	1 year, 316 days	Also President (1948–1949) and Chairman of the Presidential Council (1949–1950)

== Electoral history ==
=== National Assembly elections ===
Election	Party leader	Votes	%	Seats	+/–	Position	Government
1949	Mátyás Rákosi	as part of Patriotic People's Front		285 / 402	▲285	▲1st	In government
1953	Mátyás Rákosi	as part of Patriotic People's Front		206 / 298	▼79	1st	Sole legal party

== See also ==
- History of Hungary
- Politics of Hungary
- List of political parties in Hungary
- Eastern Bloc politics
