= 1975 Hungarian parliamentary election =

- 15 June 1975

All 352 seats in the National Assembly
- Turnout: 96.99%
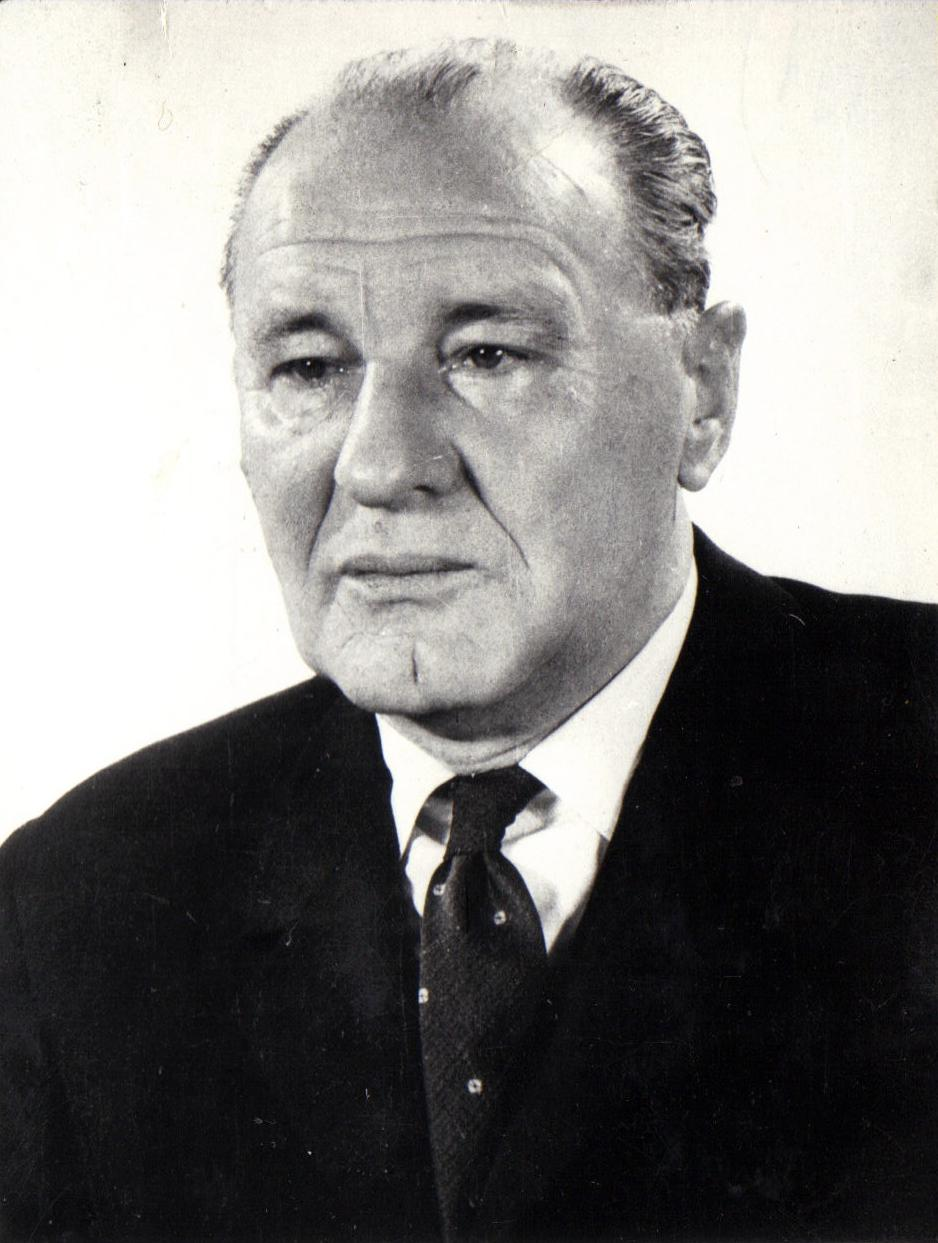

	First party	Second party
Leader	János Kádár	–
Party	MSZMP	Independents
Alliance	HNF	HNF
Seats won	215	137
Seat change	▼9	▲9

Parliamentary elections were held in Hungary on 15 June 1975. The Hungarian Socialist Workers' Party was the only party to contest the elections, and won 215 of the 352 seats, with the remaining 137 going to independents selected by the party.

All prospective candidates had to accept the program of the Patriotic People's Front, which was dominated by the HSWP. While it was possible for more than one candidate to run in a constituency, only 34 of 352 constituencies had more than one candidate.

== Results ==
Party or alliance		Votes	%	Seats	+/–
Patriotic People's Front	Hungarian Socialist Workers' Party		99.6	215	–9
Patriotic People's Front	Independents		99.6	137	+9
Against			0.4	–	–
Total				352	0
Total votes		7,527,169	–		
Registered voters/turnout		7,760,464	96.99		
Source: Nohlen & Stöver

== The activity of the parliament ==
The new parliament adopted a comprehensive reform of the social security system in 1975. The fifth five-year plan was adopted, based on the economic goals declared at the 11th Congress of the Hungarian Socialist Workers' Party. The legal foundations for environmental protection were established, and food quality and public education were regulated in 1976.
