= 1963 Hungarian parliamentary election =

- 24 February 1963

All 340 seats in the National Assembly
- Turnout: 97.20%
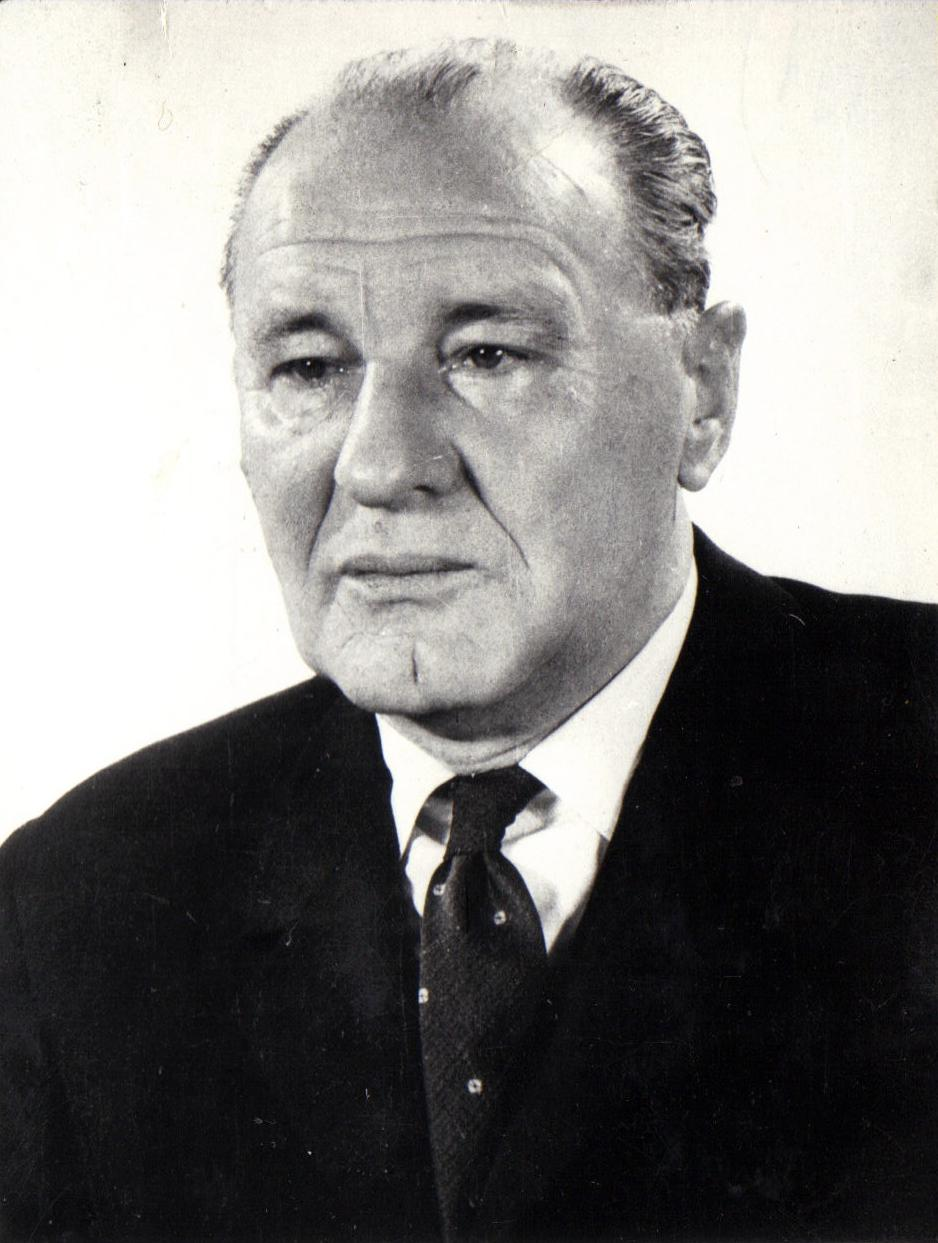

	First party	Second party
Leader	János Kádár	–
Party	MSZMP	Independents
Alliance	HNF	HNF
Leader since	25 October 1956
Seats won	252	88
Seat change	▼24	▲26

Parliamentary elections were held in Hungary on 24 August 1963. In the communist system the Hungarian Socialist Workers' Party was the only party that was allowed to contest the elections, and won 252 of the 340 seats, with the remaining 88 going to independents selected by the party.

== Results ==
Party or alliance		Votes	%	Seats	+/–
Patriotic People's Front	Hungarian Socialist Workers' Party	6,813,058	98.90	252	–24
Patriotic People's Front	Independents	6,813,058	98.90	88	+26
Against		75,777	1.10	–	–
Total		6,888,835	100.00	340	+2
Valid votes		6,888,835	99.61		
Invalid/blank votes		26,809	0.39		
Total votes		6,915,644	100.00		
Registered voters/turnout		7,114,855	97.20		
Source: Nohlen & Stöver

== The activity of the parliament ==
The parliament, responding to technological and communication changes, regulated the operation of the post and telecommunications in 1964. The uniform regulation of building permits, planning and construction served to transform the image of cities. In order to meet the water needs of industry and agriculture, water management was comprehensively regulated. The third five-year plan was adopted, based on the economic goals declared at the 9th Congress of the Hungarian Socialist Workers' Party in 1966 and the right to vote was re-established, replacing list voting with voting in single-member districts.
