= Sándor Zöld =

Hungarian politician (1913–1951)

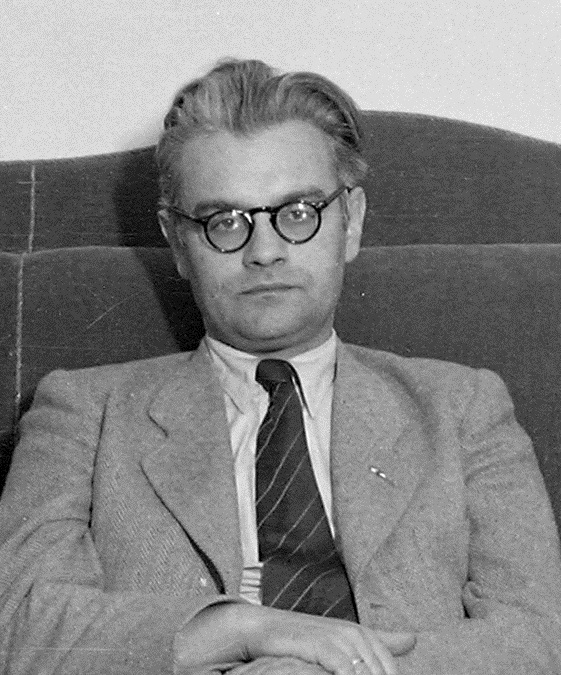

Minister of the Interior
- In office 23 June 1950 – 20 April 1951
- Prime Minister: István Dobi
- Preceded by: János Kádár
- Succeeded by: Árpád Házi

Personal details
- Born: 19 May 1913 Nagyvárad, Kingdom of Hungary, Austria-Hungary (now Oradea, Romania)
- Died: 20 April 1951 (aged 37) Budapest, Hungary
- Party: Hungarian Communist Party (1932–1948); Hungarian Working People's Party (1948–1951)
- Profession: Physician, politician

Sándor Zöld (19 May 1913 – 20 April 1951) was a Hungarian communist politician, who served as Minister of the Interior between 1950 and 1951.

== Biography ==
Born in Nagyvárad (today Oradea, Romania), his family moved to Berettyóújfalu after the signing of the Treaty of Trianon in 1920. While a medical student at the University of Debrecen he joined the illegal Hungarian Communist Party in 1932, after being recruited by Gyula Kállai. He graduated with a medical degree in 1939, and worked as a physician in Berettyóújfalu from 1942.

Following the December 1944 election Zöld was a deputy of the provisional National Assembly in Debrecen, and also served as Secretary of State in the Ministry of the Interior. He was relieved of his duties as Secretary of State in July 1945, and went on to focus on organizational tasks of the Hungarian Communist Party in Szeged District. He was again appointed as Secretary of State in the Ministry of Interior in October 1948. In September 1949 he was elected to the Central Committee, and in May 1950 to the Politburo of the Hungarian Working People's Party, formed following a merger of the Hungarian Communist Party and the Social Democratic Party of Hungary.

Zöld was appointed Minister of the Interior on 23 June 1950, but soon came under criticism after being accused of having appointed former officials of the Miklós Horthy regime to local positions, and of having failed to improve the work of his ministry. During the spring of 1951 he came into conflict with General Secretary Mátyás Rákosi, and during a meeting on 19 April 1951, he was attacked by Mihály Farkas and Gábor Péter. The next day, authorities found Zöld's dead body together with those of his whole family: his mother, his wife, his six-year-old daughter and eight-year-old son. According to the investigation carried out, Zöld killed his family with a hunting rifle before committing suicide. The incident was shrouded in secrecy during the Hungarian People's Republic, fueling speculations that Zöld and his family had actually been murdered due to his conflict with Rákosi. This has however been ruled out by historians, as communist politicians who fell out of favor at the time were typically arrested and subjected to show trials (such as László Rajk in 1949), and not extrajudicially assassinated. Zöld was deprived of his position as Minister of the Interior as well as his offices in the Hungarian Working People's Party on the day of his death. His ashes were reburied in an honorary grave in Kerepesi Cemetery on 1 June 1957.

Political offices
Preceded by János Kádár	Minister of the Interior; 1950–1951	Succeeded by Árpád Házi
