= Ferenc Erdei =

Hungarian politician and sociologist

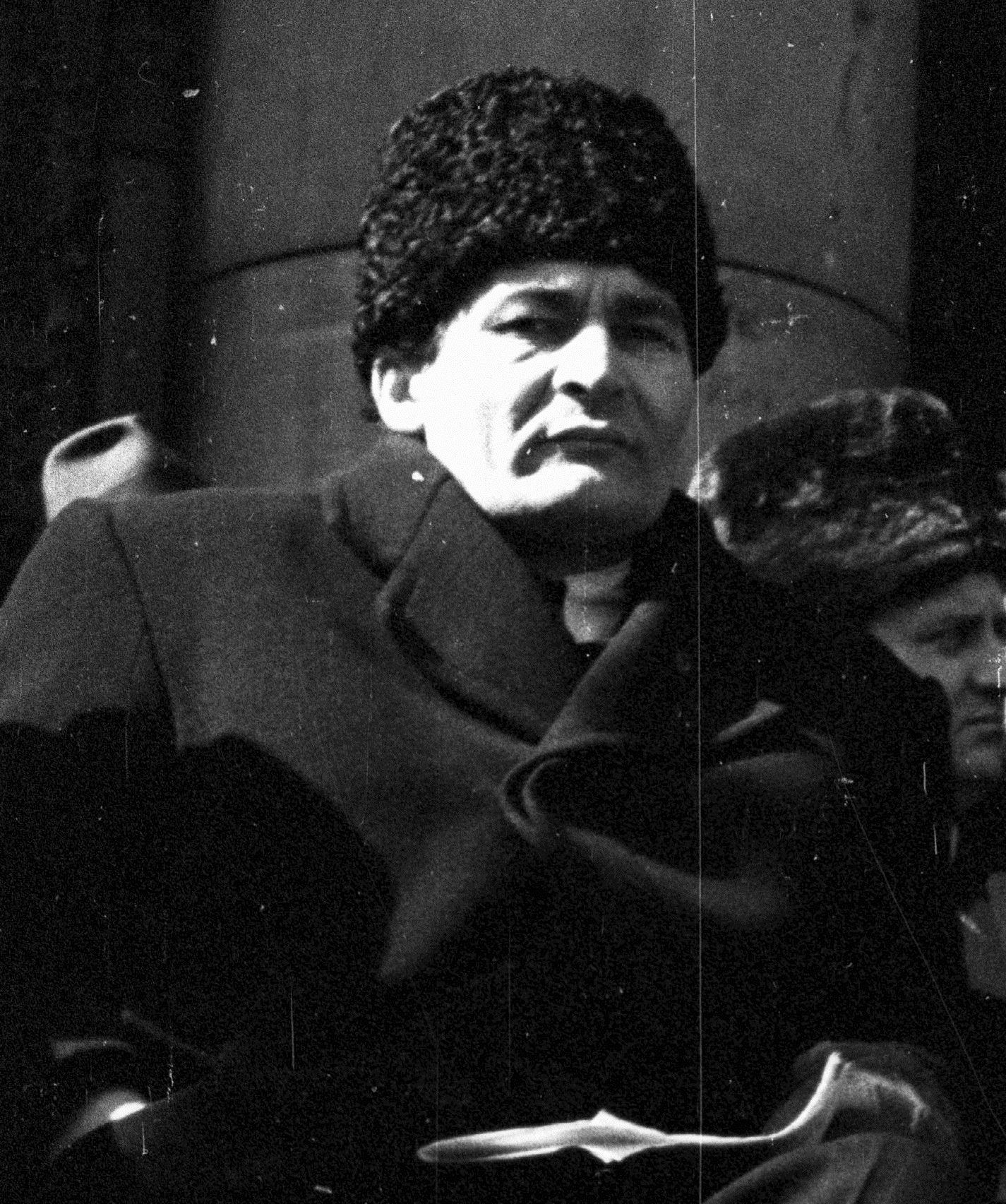

Minister of Justice of Hungary
- In office 4 July 1953 – 30 October 1954
- Prime Minister: Imre Nagy
- Preceded by: Béla Kovács
- Succeeded by: Erik Molnár

Minister of Agriculture of Hungary
- In office 11 June 1949 – 4 July 1953
- Prime Minister: István Dobi Mátyás Rákosi
- Preceded by: István Csala
- Succeeded by: András Hegedüs
- In office 30 October 1954 – 15 November 1955
- Prime Minister: Imre Nagy András Hegedüs
- Preceded by: András Hegedüs
- Succeeded by: János Matolcsi

Minister of the Interior of Hungary
- In office 21 December 1944 (officially 27 March 1945) – 15 November 1945
- Prime Minister: Béla Miklós
- Preceded by: Gábor Vajna
- Succeeded by: Imre Nagy

Personal details
- Born: 24 December 1910 Makó, Csanád County, Kingdom of Hungary, Austria-Hungary
- Died: 11 May 1971 (aged 60) Budapest, Hungarian People's Republic
- Party: NPP (1939–1949); MDP (1949–1956); MSZMP (1956–1971)
- Profession: Sociologist, politician

Ferenc Erdei (24 December 1910 – 11 May 1971) was a Hungarian politician and sociologist. Initially a member of the National Peasant Party (NPP), he supported the party's merging into the Hungarian Working People's Party (MDP) and held a number of ministerial positions after World War II and in the Hungarian People's Republic.

== Biography ==
Born into a smallholder's family, Erdei completed elementary and secondary school in his hometown of Makó. Between 1929 and 1934 he studied at the Faculty of Law and Political Science at Franz Joseph University in Szeged, where he graduated with a degree in sociology; while at university, Erdei was introduced to Marxist ideas. After graduation, he traveled to the Netherlands, Germany and Switzerland in 1935, where he studied cooperative economic systems. Upon his return to Hungary, Erdei worked as a manager at a cooperative of onion farmers in Makó. At this point a member of the National Independence Kossuth Party (OFKP), he was among the initiators and leaders of the March Front, a progressive political and intellectual movement founded in the spring of 1937.

In October 1937, Erdei moved to Budapest in order to finish a study on the Hungarian peasantry. He participated in the founding of the National Peasant Party (NPP) in the summer of 1939, and was elected to the party's executive committee. From the late 1930s and during World War II, Erdei devoted most of his time to sociological studies, and also wrote for the social democratic newspaper Népszava.

In the autumn of 1944, Erdei contacted the underground Hungarian Communist Party in Szeged. In December 1944, he joined the unofficial Debrecen-based provisional government of Béla Miklós as Minister of the Interior; the cabinet officially took office in March 1945, after the retreat of the last German forces in the country and the beginning of the Soviet occupation of Hungary, and remained in power until November. From the spring of 1946, Erdei served as vice-president, and from February 1947 as secretary-general, of the National Peasant Party; as such, he supported the party's participation in the Hungarian National Independence Front, as well as its subsequent merging into the Hungarian Working People's Party in 1949.

In June 1949, Erdei was appointed Minister of Agriculture in the cabinets of István Dobi and Mátyás Rákosi. As such, he was responsible for the collectivization of the farms in Hungary, as well as for mass persecutions of large parts of the large-scale farmers as kulaks. In June 1953, Erdei was appointed Minister of Justice in the cabinet of Imre Nagy; he held this position until October 1954, when he returned to the post of Minister of Agriculture.

In November 1955, Erdei he was appointed Deputy Chairman of the Council of Ministers (Deputy Prime Minister) under Nagy. A close colleague of the latter during the Hungarian Revolution of 1956, Erdei publicly expressed support for a multi-party system and called for the reorganization of the ruling Patriotic People's Front. As a member of the Hungarian delegation which abortively negotiated the withdrawal of the Soviet Army from Hungary at the Soviet military base in Tököl on 3 November, Erdei was arrested together with the other members of the delegation on the orders of KGB chief Ivan Serov. After a few weeks, Erdei was released after an intervention by János Kádár.

Immediately after the suppression of the 1956 revolution, Erdei largely withdrew from political life, instead focusing on scientific work. From December 1957 until April 1964, and again from February 1970 until his death, he served as General Secretary of the Hungarian Academy of Sciences. He returned to politics when he was appointed General Secretary of the National Council of the Patriotic People's Front in 1964, an office he would retain until 1970. From November 1965 until his death, Erdei was also a member of the Presidential Council.

== Honours and awards ==
=== National honours ===
- Kossuth Prize (1948; 1962)
- Order of Kossuth, 1st Class (1948)
- Order of the Flag of the People's Republic of Hungary, 1st Class (1970)

=== Foreign honours ===
- (Czechoslovakia) Grand Cross of the Order of the White Lion (1949)
- Commander Grand Cross of the Order of the Lion of Finland (1968)

Political offices
Preceded by Gábor Vajna	Minister of the Interior; 1944–1945	Succeeded by Imre Nagy
Preceded by István Csala	Minister of Agriculture; 1949–1953	Succeeded by András Hegedüs
Preceded by Béla Kovács	Minister of Justice; 1953–1954	Succeeded by Erik Molnár
Preceded by András Hegedüs	Minister of Agriculture; 1954–1955	Succeeded by János Matolcsi
