= Újfehértó =

Town in Szabolcs-Szatmár-Bereg County, Hungary

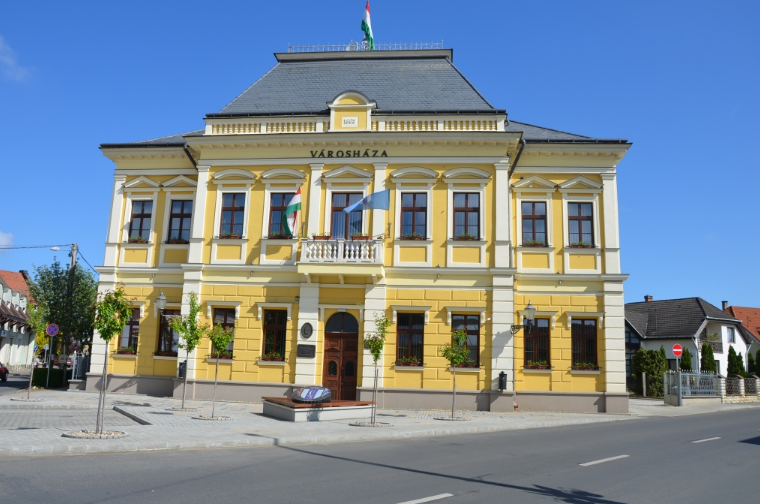
- Town hall

- Flag Coat of arms

- Location in Hungary
- Coordinates: 47°47′56″N 21°41′00″E
- Country: Hungary
- County: Szabolcs–Szatmár–Bereg

Area
  - Total: 140.88 km^{2} (54.39 sq mi)

Population (2005)
  - Total: 13,611
  - Density: 96.614/km^{2} (250.23/sq mi)
- Time zone: UTC+1 (CET)
  - Summer (DST): UTC+2 (CEST)
- Postal code: 4244
- Area code: 42
- Website: ujfeherto.hu

Újfehértó (Yiddish: ראַצפֿערט, romanized: Ratsfert, German: Ratzfert) is a small town in Szabolcs–Szatmár–Bereg County in the Northern Great Plain of eastern Hungary.

== History ==
By 1920, the Jewish population had reached 1303 people, 11% of the total population. On 17 May 1944, the 400 Jewish families living in the village were deported to the Auschwitz concentration camps via Nyirjes (now Brezov in Slovakia) and Sima.

== Twin towns – sister cities ==
Újfehértó is twinned with:

- Braniștea, Romania
- Cherechiu, Romania
- Doberdò del Lago, Italy
- Hut, Ukraine
- Váhovce, Slovakia
- Żarów, Poland

== Notable people ==
- András Toma (1925–2004), probably the last prisoner of war (1945–2000) from World War II to be repatriated
- Erika Marozsán (born 1972), actress
- János Marozsán (born in 1965), footballer
- Péter Gábor (1906–1993), politician and secret police leader in the Hungarian People's Republic
- Teitelbaum family of rebbes of the Satmar dynasty in Hasidic Judaism (see Moshe Teitelbaum (Satmar))
- Ferenc Zaijti (1886–1961): Painter, representative of Hungarian Turanist Orientalism, and curator of Oriental studies at what is now the Metropolitan Ervin Szabó Library

== Gallery ==
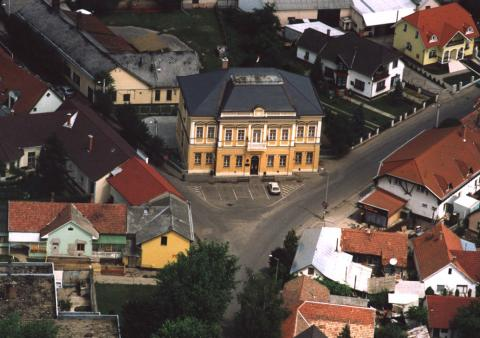

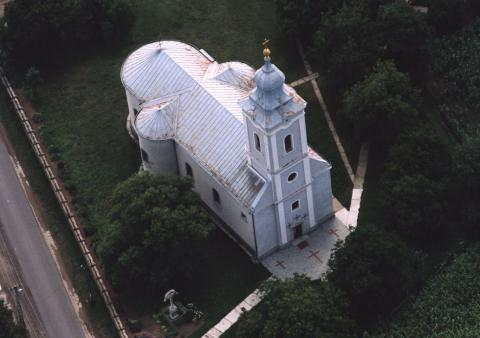

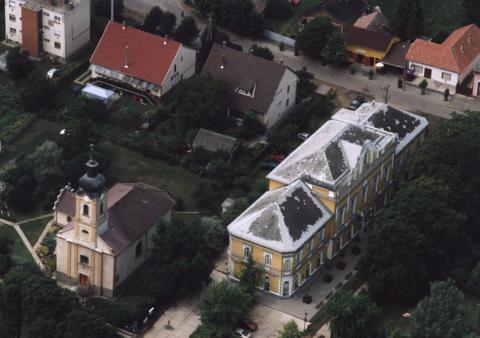

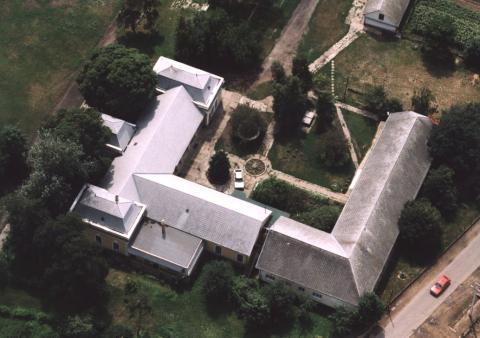

== See also ==
- Satmar
- Klausenburg (Hasidic dynasty)
- Nagykálló
