= Hortobágy labor camps =

Prison camps in Hungary

The forced labor camps of Hortobágy were established by the communist regime in the eastern parts of Hungary in the early 1950s.

Between 1950 and 1953 about ten thousand people were taken here without a legal verdict. They worked under armed supervision and in inhumane conditions on the state farms in Hortobágy, Nagykunság and Hajdúság.

The deportations began on June 23, 1950. Thousands of families from the western and southern borders, deemed unsafe because of the Cold War by the government at the time (Dobi István, Rákosi Mátyas, Nagy Imre), were taken to the twelve labor camps on the Alföld. They had barely an hour to pack, their papers were taken and their beds were about half a meter wide. Their forced labor took place on nearby villages'state farms until the first Nagy Imre government declared an amnesty in July 1953.

The camps were closed that fall. The prisoners could not return to their homes and were employed as unskilled laborers. The state confiscated their real estate and money, which hoped to frighten the population. None were compensated.

== List ==
Camp name	Years of existence
Árkus	1950–1953
Borsós	1952–1953
Borzas-Mihályfalva	1950–1953
Ebes	1951–1953
Elep	1951–1953
Erzsébet-tanya	1950–1953
Kócspuszta	1950–1953
Kónya	1950–1953
Kormópuszta	1950–1953
Lászlómajor	1952–1953
Lenintanya	1950–1953
Tedej	1951–1953

== Memorial ==
Those forced laborers who were still alive in 2000 founded the Association of those Deported to the Labor Camps of Hortobágy (Hortobágyi Kényszermunkatáborokba Elhurcoltak Egyesülete). It has 915 members as of 2009. A stone was erected to recognize those incarcerated.
