= Reformed Church, Abaújszántó =

Reformed Church of Abaújszántó
- Abaújszántói református templom (Hungarian)
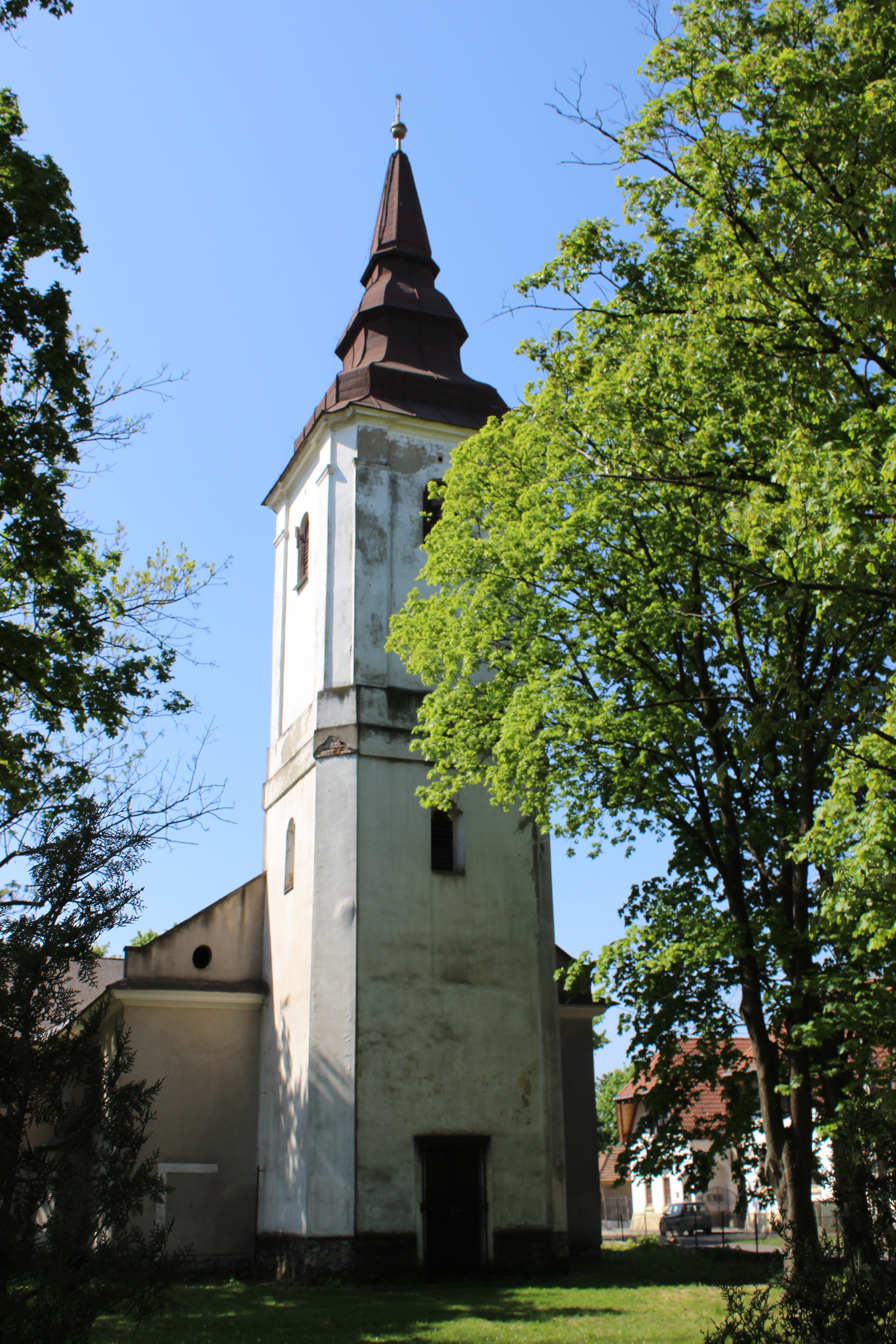

- Location within Hungary
- Location: Abaújszántó
- Country: Hungary
- Denomination: Reformed Christianity
- Website: refabaujszanto.hu

History
- Status: Active

Architecture
- Heritage designation: Protected National Monument
- Designated: 1958
- Style: Baroque
- Years built: 1751–1752

Administration
- District: Cistibiscan Church District
- Parish: Reformed Congregation of Abaújszántó

The Reformed Church of Abaújszántó (Hungarian: Abaújszántói református templom) is a 18th-century Protestant church in Abaújszántó, Hungary.

== Description ==
Located in the center of the town, the single-nave church has a north–south orientation, a polygonal apse, and is supported by buttresses; in front of its northern facade stands a tower with a stepped roof. Its eastern side is extended by a later-added transept.

== History ==
Protestantism appeared in the town of Abaújszántó in the 1530s. The town's medieval church was built in the 15th century, and in the 16th century, along with the rest of the town, it became Reformed. At the end of the 17th century, the Catholics took it back. From 1705 onward, it was once again Reformed, until 1751, when the queen permanently granted it to the Catholics.

Since there were many Calvinists in the town, they were granted permission in 1751 to build a new church. This present-day church was consecrated on December 3, 1752. The pulpit and altar, as well as the entire interior, bear the characteristics of the Baroque style.

Most of the church burned down in 1864, but it was rebuilt shortly after. In 1953, it received an organ, which was installed in the east side aisle.

== See also ==
- Reformed Church in Hungary
- Abaújszántó
