= Bárányos =

Bárányos is a surname. Notable people with the surname include:

- Károly Bárányos (1892–1956), Hungarian politician
- Zsolt Bárányos (born 1975), Hungarian footballer
