= Mátyás Rákosi =

Hungarian Communist leader (1892-1971)

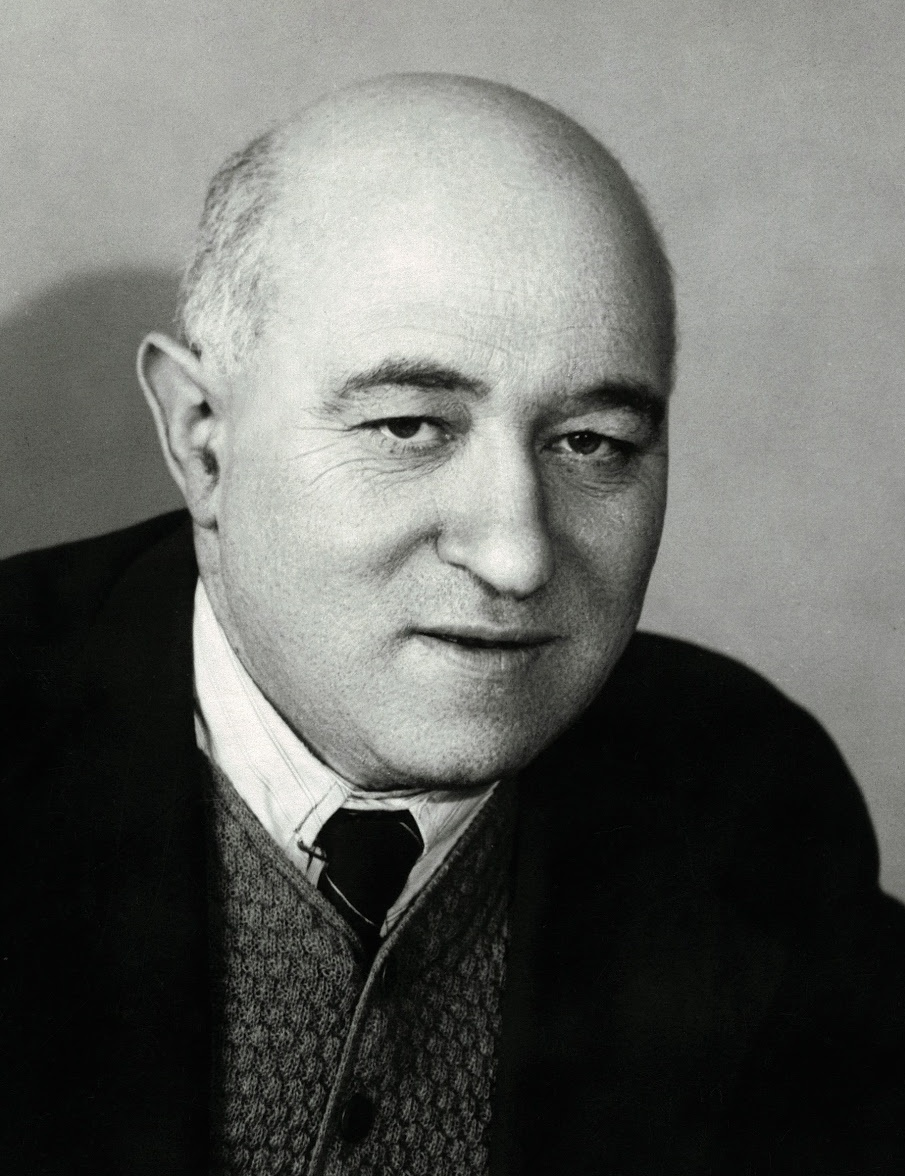

First Secretary (Note: Until 28 June 1953, the post was known as General Secretary) of the Hungarian Working People's Party (Note: Before 12 June 1948, the party was the Hungarian Communist Party)
- In office 23 February 1945 – 18 July 1956
- Preceded by: Office Established
- Succeeded by: Ernő Gerő

Chairman of the Council of Ministers of the People's Republic of Hungary
- In office 14 August 1952 – 4 July 1953
- Chairman of the Presidential Council: István Dobi
- Preceded by: István Dobi
- Succeeded by: Imre Nagy

Prime Minister of Hungary
- Acting; 31 May 1947
- President: Zoltán Tildy
- Preceded by: Ferenc Nagy
- Succeeded by: Lajos Dinnyés
- Acting; 1 February 1946 – 4 February 1946
- President: Zoltán Tildy
- Preceded by: Zoltán Tildy
- Succeeded by: Ferenc Nagy
Additional positions
Member of the High National Council
In office 27 September 1945 – 7 December 1945 Serving with Béla Miklós and Béla Zsedényi
Preceded by	József Révai
Succeeded by	Second High National Council: Zoltán Tildy; Ferenc Nagy; Béla Varga; László Rajk
Deputy Prime Minister
In office 4 February 1946 – 14 August 1952 Serving with Árpád Szakasits (to 5 August 1948)
Prime Minister	Ferenc Nagy Lajos Dinnyés István Dobi
Preceded by	Jenő Szöllősi
Succeeded by	List: Ernő Gerő; Árpád Házi; Imre Nagy; Károly Kiss; István Hidas

Personal details
- Born: Mátyás Rosenfeld; 9 March 1892 Ada, Bács-Bodrog County, Kingdom of Hungary, Austria-Hungary (present-day Vojvodina, Serbia)
- Died: 5 February 1971 (aged 78) Gorky, Russian SFSR, Soviet Union
- Resting place: Farkasréti Cemetery, Budapest
- Party: MDP
- Other political affiliations: MSZDP (1910–1918); MKP (1918–1948)
- Spouse: Fenia Kornilova (1903–1980)

Military service
- Allegiance: Austria-Hungary; Hungarian Soviet Republic
- Branch/service: Austro-Hungarian Army; Hungarian Red Army
- Years of service: 1914–1915; 1919
- Rank: Commander of the Red Guard
- Battles/wars: World War I: Eastern Front; Revolutions and interventions in Hungary (1918–20)

Mátyás Rákosi (Note: Hungarian pronunciation: [ˈmaːcaːʃ ˈraːkoʃi]) (né Rosenfeld; 9 March 1892 – 5 February 1971) was a Hungarian communist politician who was the de facto leader of Hungary from 1948 to 1956. He served first as General Secretary of the Hungarian Communist Party from 1945 to 1948 and then as General Secretary (later renamed First Secretary) of the Hungarian Working People's Party from 1948 to 1956. Mátyás Rákosi was the chief architect of the laws that confiscated the property of various churches in Hungary, as well as the mass deportations to Hungarian forced labor camps, such as Hortobágy and Recsk forced labor camps.

Rákosi had been involved in left-wing politics since his youth, and in 1919 was a leading commissar in the short-lived Hungarian Soviet Republic. After the fall of the Communist government, he escaped the country and worked abroad as an agent of the Comintern. He was arrested in 1924 after attempting to return to Hungary and organize the Communist Party underground, and ultimately spent over fifteen years in prison. He became a cause célèbre in the international Communist movement, and the predominantly Hungarian Rákosi Battalion of the International Brigades in the Spanish Civil War bore his name. Rákosi was finally allowed to leave for the Soviet Union in 1940 in exchange for prized battle flags captured by Tsarist Russian forces after the Hungarian Revolution of 1848.

As the Red Army drove the German Wehrmacht out of Hungary at the end of World War II, Rákosi returned to his home country in early 1945 and became the leader of the re-founded Hungarian Communist Party. The party suffered a crushing defeat in Hungary's postwar free election, at the hands of the agrarian Independent Smallholders' Party; however, at Moscow's insistence the Communists received key positions in the government including the Interior Ministry, while Rákosi himself became a heavily influential deputy prime minister. From this position, the Communists were able to use political intrigue, subterfuge, and conspiracy to destroy their opponents piece by piece, in what Rákosi would later term "salami tactics". By 1948, they had gained total power over the country, and in 1949 the country was proclaimed a people's republic with Rákosi as its absolute ruler.

Rákosi was an ardent Stalinist, and his government was very loyal to the Soviet Union; he even set up a personality cult of his own, modeled on that of Stalin. He presided over the mass imprisonment of hundreds of thousands of Hungarian people, and the deaths of thousands. He orchestrated show trials modeled on those of the USSR, among the most prominent victims of which was his former lieutenant László Rajk. His policies of collectivization and mass repression devastated the country's economy and political life, causing massive discontent. After the death of Stalin in 1953, Rákosi was partially demoted at Moscow's behest and the reformist Communist Imre Nagy became the new prime minister; however, Rákosi was able to use his continuing influence as First Secretary to thwart all of Nagy's attempts at reform and ultimately force the latter out of office in 1955.

After Soviet leader Nikita Khrushchev's famous "Secret Speech" in early 1956 denouncing the crimes of Stalin, Rákosi found his position fatally compromised. Large numbers of people within the party and society at large began to speak out against him and call for his resignation, as information about the Party's past abuses came to light. Rákosi was finally forced to resign in July 1956 and leave for the Soviet Union, replaced by his second-in-command Ernő Gerő. The Hungarian Revolution of 1956 occurred barely three months later as a result of the abuses of Rákosi's system, and his former rival Imre Nagy became a dominant figure in the Revolution. Soviet troops ultimately crushed the uprising and installed a new Communist government under János Kádár.

Rákosi lived out the rest of his life in exile in the Soviet Union, denied permission to return home by the Hungarian government, out of fear of mass unrest. He died in Gorky in 1971, and his ashes were returned to Hungary in secret. Rákosi is generally seen as a symbol of tyranny and oppression in Hungary.

== Early years ==
Rákosi was born in Ada, a village in Bács-Bodrog County in the Kingdom of Hungary (now a town in Vojvodina, Serbia). Born to Jewish parents, the fourth son of József Rosenfeld, a grocer, his mother Cecília Léderer would give birth to seven more children. Of his younger siblings the most notable was Ferenc Biró (1904–2006), an administrator, who also became active in Communist politics and was, for a time, General Manager of the Mátyás Rákosi Steel and Metal Works during his brother's rule. His other siblings were Béla (1886–1944), Jolán (1888–1988), Matild Gizella (1890–1970), Izabella (1895–1967), Margit (1896–1926), Zoltán (1898–1988), Mária (1902–1938), Dezső (1906–1960) and Hajnal (1908–1944). József, Béla and Hajnal were killed during the Holocaust.

Rákosi's paternal grandfather participated in the Hungarian Revolution of 1848; as a result, he had to flee the village following the defeat. Rákosi's father, József Rosenfeld, was called "Kossuth's Jew" by the villagers, because he had been a member and avid supporter of the oppositionist Party of Independence and '48. He changed his surname Rosenfeld to Rákosi in 1903. He later repudiated religion and in common with most other Marxists described himself as an atheist and opponent of organised religion.

Rákosi was a diligent and good student during his childhood. He finished his elementary studies in Sopron, then took his final exam at the High Technical Gymnasium of Szeged in 1910, where one of his teachers was Mihály Babits. He then studied external trade at the Eastern Commerce Academy. He won scholarships for a year each in Hamburg (1912) and London (1913).

While still a student in Hungary, he joined the Hungarian Social Democratic Party (MSZDP) in 1910 and was also a secretary and active member of the anarcho-syndicalist student movement, the Galilei Circle.

He served in the Austro-Hungarian Army during the First World War and was captured on the Eastern Front in 1915 and held as a prisoner-of-war in Far Eastern POW camps by the Russians until the end of the war. Taking advantage of the chaotic situation in Russia, he successfully escaped from his detention and moved to Petrograd, centre of the Bolshevik Revolution.

== Early career ==
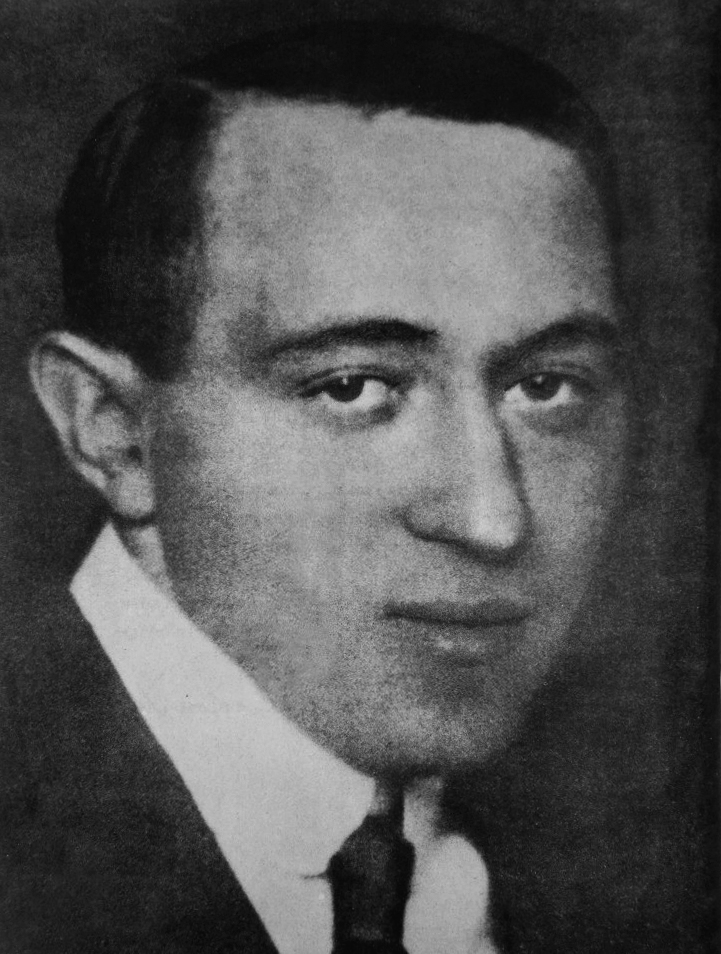
Mátyás Rákosi in 1919

After returning to Hungary, he participated in the communist movement of Béla Kun and also joined the Party of Communists in Hungary. During the short-lived 133-day Communist rule after the resignation of President Mihály Károlyi, when the Hungarian Soviet Republic was established, Rákosi served as Deputy People's Commissar for Trade from 21 March to 3 April in the Revolutionary Governing Council led by Sándor Garbai. Between 3 April and 24 June 1919, Rákosi was one of the six people's commissars for social production, alongside Jenő Varga, Antal Dovcsák, Gyula Hevesi, József Kelen and Ferenc Bajáki. He was also involved in the Hungarian Red Army's Northern and Eastern military campaigns against the newly formed Czechoslovakia and Romania. At the end of July 1919, he was promoted to Commander of the internal law-enforcement Red Guard for a short time.

Following the Hungarian Soviet Republic's fall, Rákosi fled Hungary on 2 August 1919 via the Austrian border, eventually to the Soviet Union where he worked as part of the Communist International, including representing it at the Livorno Congress of the Italian Socialist Party in 1921.

Rákosi arrived in the Soviet Union via Vienna as a member of the Béla Kun group in May 1920. with instructions from Béla Kun and Jenő Landler, he was the first to personally report to Lenin about his experiences in the fallen Hungarian Soviet Republic. Although he did not develop a close relationship with Lenin later, the meeting remained a defining experience for Rákosi for the rest of his life and he made a painting about this important meeting in the 1950s.

The positional advantage that Rákosi gained by being among the first of the former leaders of the Soviet Republic to arrive in Moscow contributed to the rapid rise of his international communist political career. He spoke twice at the Second Congress of the Comintern, and in the autumn of 1920 he was already organizing as a delegate of the world organization in Germany, Austria and Czechoslovakia. In January 1921 – also on behalf of the Comintern – he visited Italy, and then again he convinced the German and Czechoslovak parties of the necessity of excluding the moderates. Several complaints were received against him due to his left-wing radicalism (from both the Italians and the Germans), nevertheless at the Third Congress of the Comintern – mainly thanks to Zinoviev's actions – Rákosi was elected one of the secretaries of the Executive Committee. From then until the beginning of his mission to Budapest (December 1924), Rákosi worked in the leadership of the Comintern. In this capacity, his living conditions were probably better than average, although he does not mention this in his memoirs. Since he traveled a lot due to his frequent foreign missions, he did not spend much time in Moscow. It is certain that during his stays in Moscow – like other members of the Hungarian communist emigration – he also lived in the so-called "emigrant house" on Vorontsovo Field.

After returning to Hungary in 1924, he was imprisoned, but he was released to the Soviet Union in 1940, in exchange for the Hungarian revolutionary banners captured by Russian troops at Világos in 1849.

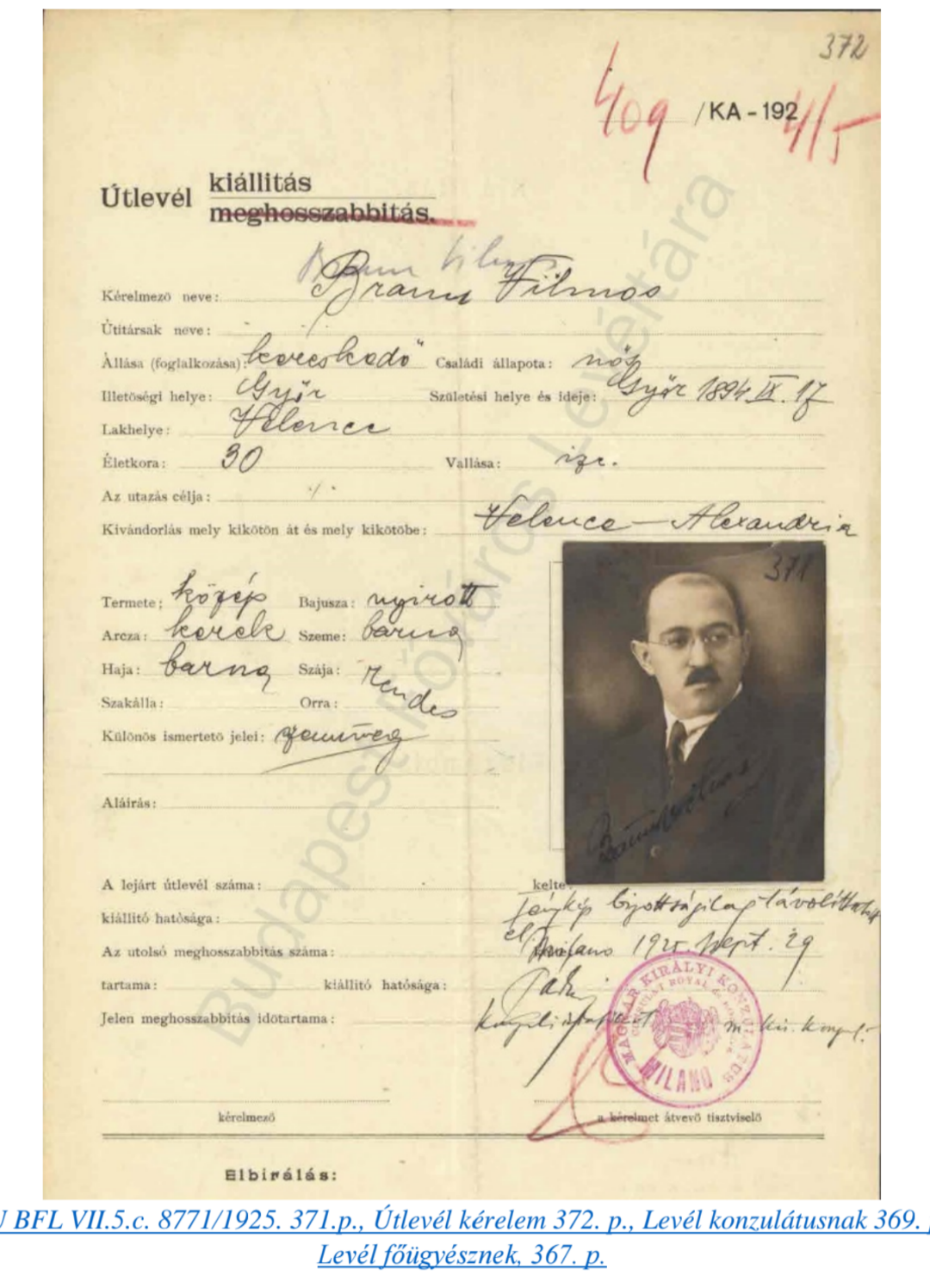
Mátyás Rákosi's fake identity application for passport as Vilmos Braun in 1925

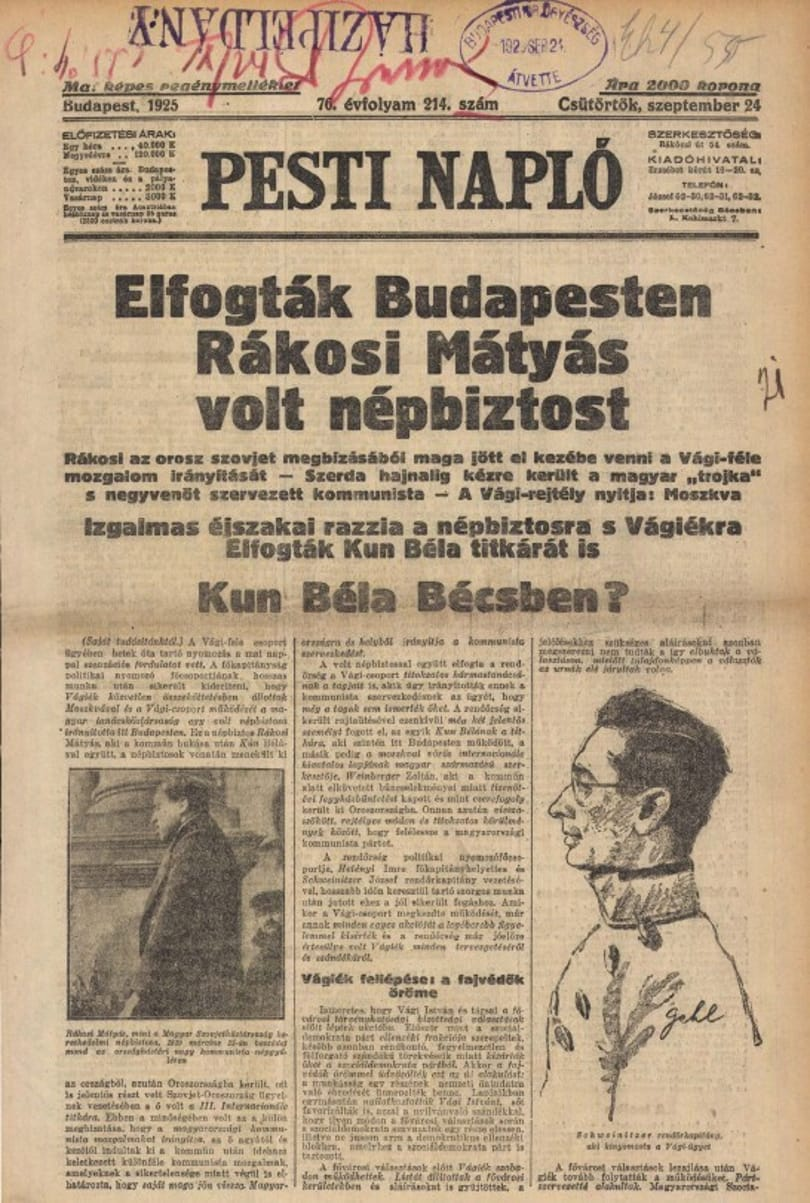
Pesti Napló newspaper 25.09.1925: Mátyás Rákosi had been captured by police

The Rákosi trials refer to the criminal trials held between 12 July and 4 August 1926, and then between 21 January and 4 February 1935. The first trial dealt with the case of communists arrested in September 1925.

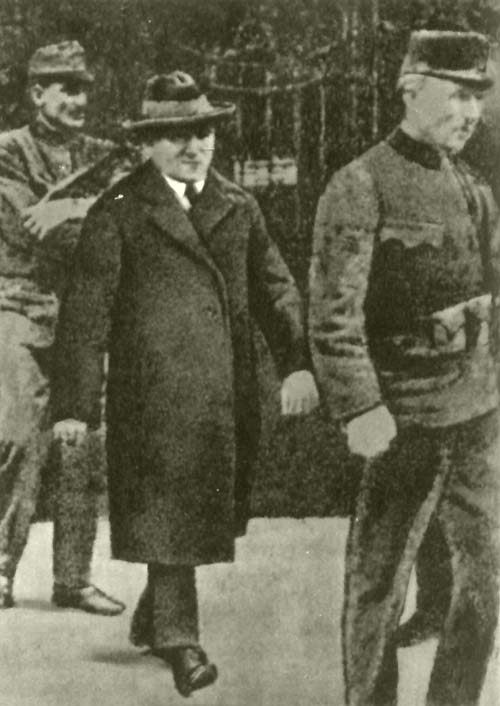
Mátyás Rákosi escorted by police September 1925

Following international and domestic protests, the summary trial court, which sat on 14-16 November 1925, ordered the case to be referred to a regular court. The first defendant in the case, Mátyás Rákosi, was sentenced to eight and a half years in prison, the second defendant, Károly Őry, to four years, and the third defendant, Ignác Gőgös, to three and a half years.

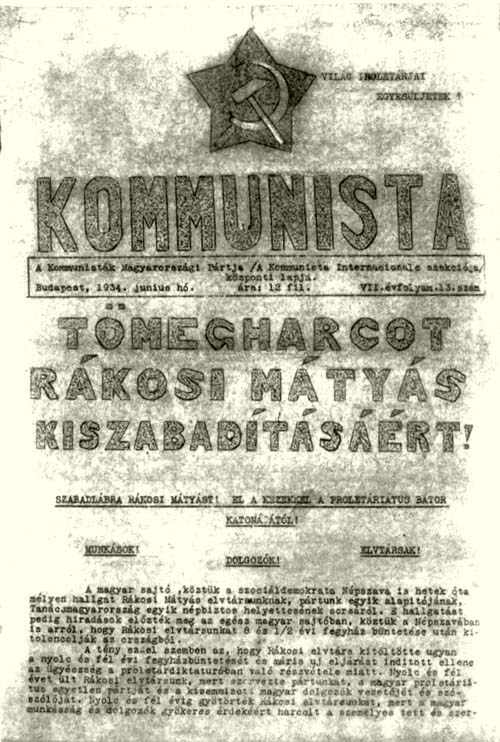
Set free Mátyás Rákosi 1934 illegal communist leaflet

Rákosi's sentence expired on 24 April 1934, but due to his role during the Hungarian Soviet Republic , he was convicted again in the so-called second Rákosi trial – for crimes of high treason, rebellion, 27 counts of murder as an accomplice, 17 counts of murder as an instigator, and counterfeiting of currency – and was sentenced to life imprisonment.

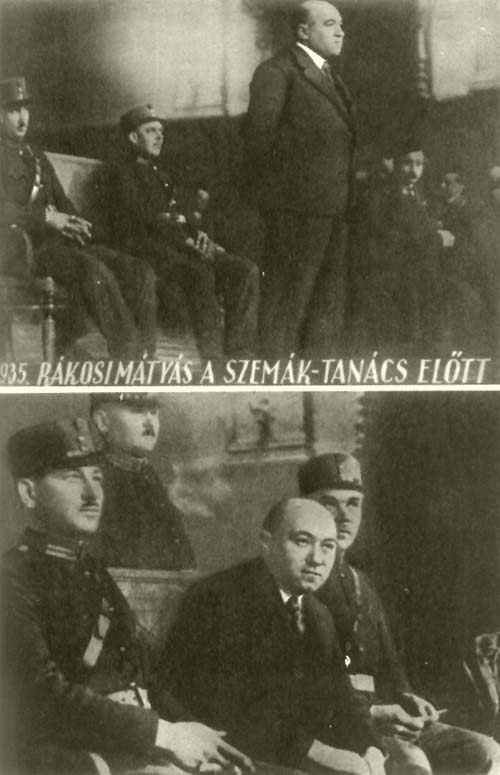
Second trial of Mátyás Rákosi in 1935

With the permission of the Ministry of Justice, he was released on parole on 30 October 1940, for the period until 30 October 1944. He was allowed one month to visit his relatives in USSR. Rákosi left the country on 2 November and, according to police reports, had not returned on 23 December, so his parole was revoked on 2 January 1941.

Rákosi first traveled to Kiev, where Khrushchev organized a festive reception for the released politician. The train carrying Rákosi and Zoltán Vas arrived in Moscow on 6 November, and the next day they were both guests of honor at the 7 November ceremony, watching the parade organized for the anniversary of the revolution on Red Square next to Stalin.

In the Soviet Union, he became leader of the Comintern. Stalin chose him as the leader of Hungarian Communist Party MKP. In 1942, he married divorced lawyer Feodora (Fenia) Kornilova, a woman of Yakut origin. He returned to Debrecen, Hungary, on 30 January 1945, having been selected by the Soviet authorities to organise the Hungarian Communist Party.

== Leader of Hungary ==
- Rákosi regime 15 June 1949 – 23 October 1956
- President: Árpád Szakasits; Sándor Rónai; István Dobi
- Premier: István Dobi; Himself; Imre Nagy; András Hegedüs
- Party: MDP

Rákosi addresses an election rally in Budapest, 1954

When the Red Army set up a Soviet-approved government in Hungary (1944–1945), Rákosi was appointed General Secretary of the Hungarian Communist Party (MKP) (1945). He was a member of the High National Council from 27 September to 7 December 1945. Rákosi was deputy prime minister from 1945 to 1949, and was acting prime minister from 1 to 4 February 1946 and on 31 May 1947.

Initially, Rákosi and the Communists appeared willing to work within the system. From 1947 onwards, however, he and the Communists began pressuring the other parties to exclude those not willing to work with the Communists on the grounds that they were "fascists" or fascist sympathisers. Later on, after the Communists won complete control, it was commonly believed that Rákosi referred to this practice as "salami tactics," saying he had destroyed the non-Communist forces in the country by "cutting them off like slices of salami." However, no verified source for the "salami" quote has ever been discovered. According to historian Norman Stone, the term might have been invented by the leader of the Hungarian Independence Party, Zoltán Pfeiffer.

The process began when Smallholder Prime Minister Ferenc Nagy was forced to resign in favour of a more pliant Smallholder, Lajos Dinnyés. By the 1947 elections, the Communists had won a plurality, and had largely emasculated the next-largest non-Communist Party, the Social Democrats.

By October 1947, Rákosi had dropped all pretense of liberal democracy. He gave the non-Communist parties an ultimatum: cooperate with a new, Communist-dominated coalition government or go into exile. By the end of 1947, the opposition parties had largely shunted aside their more courageous members, leaving them in the hands of fellow travellers willing to do the Communists' bidding. In the summer of 1948, the Communists forced the Social Democrats to merge with them to form the Hungarian Working People's Party (MDP). However, the few remaining independent-minded Social Democrats were quickly pushed out in short order, leaving the MDP as an enlarged and renamed MKP.

He also pushed out the Smallholder president, Zoltán Tildy, in favour of Social Democrat-turned-Communist Árpád Szakasits, and forced Dinnyés to resign in favour of the openly pro-Communist István Dobi. A year later, elections took place with a single list of candidates. Although non-Communists nominally still figured, this was not a coalition in any real sense. By this time, other parties were subservient tools of the Communists. Therefore, Communist control was, in effect, total. The new, Communist-dominated legislature wrote a Soviet-style constitution, cementing Rákosi's control.

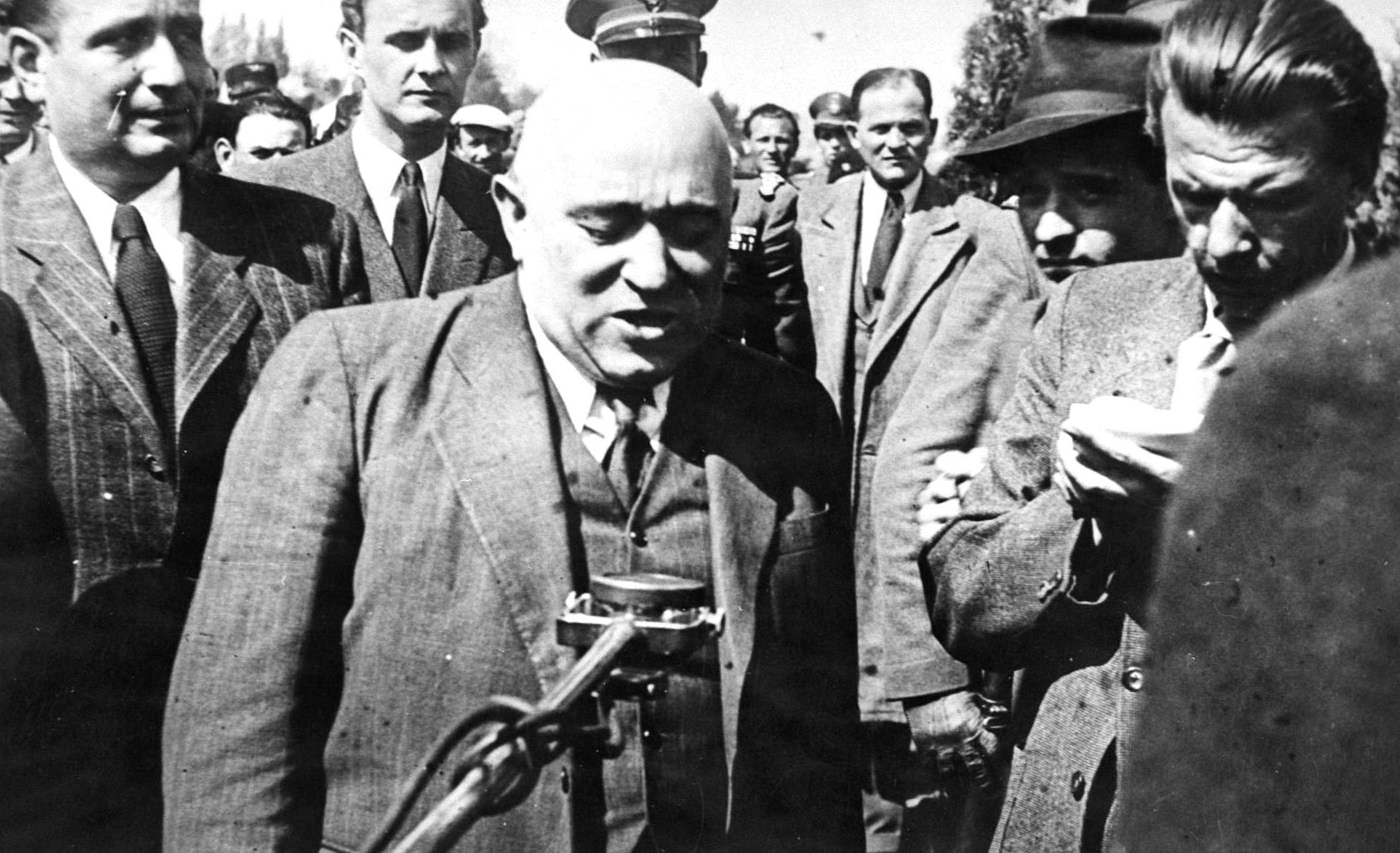
Mátyás Rákosi

Rákosi described himself as "Stalin's best Hungarian disciple" and "Stalin's best pupil". At the height of his rule, he developed a strong cult of personality around himself.

In 1952, after writer Tibor Déry wrote a story about Hungarian woman violated by a Soviet soldier, Rákosi said he wanted to ban the word "rape". Raging at Déry he said "Can't you leave this idiocy alone? What is there write about? In Hungary there are, say 3,000 villages. Supposing the Russians have their way with, say three women in each village that makes 9,000 in all. Is that so many? You writers have no idea of the law of large numbers."

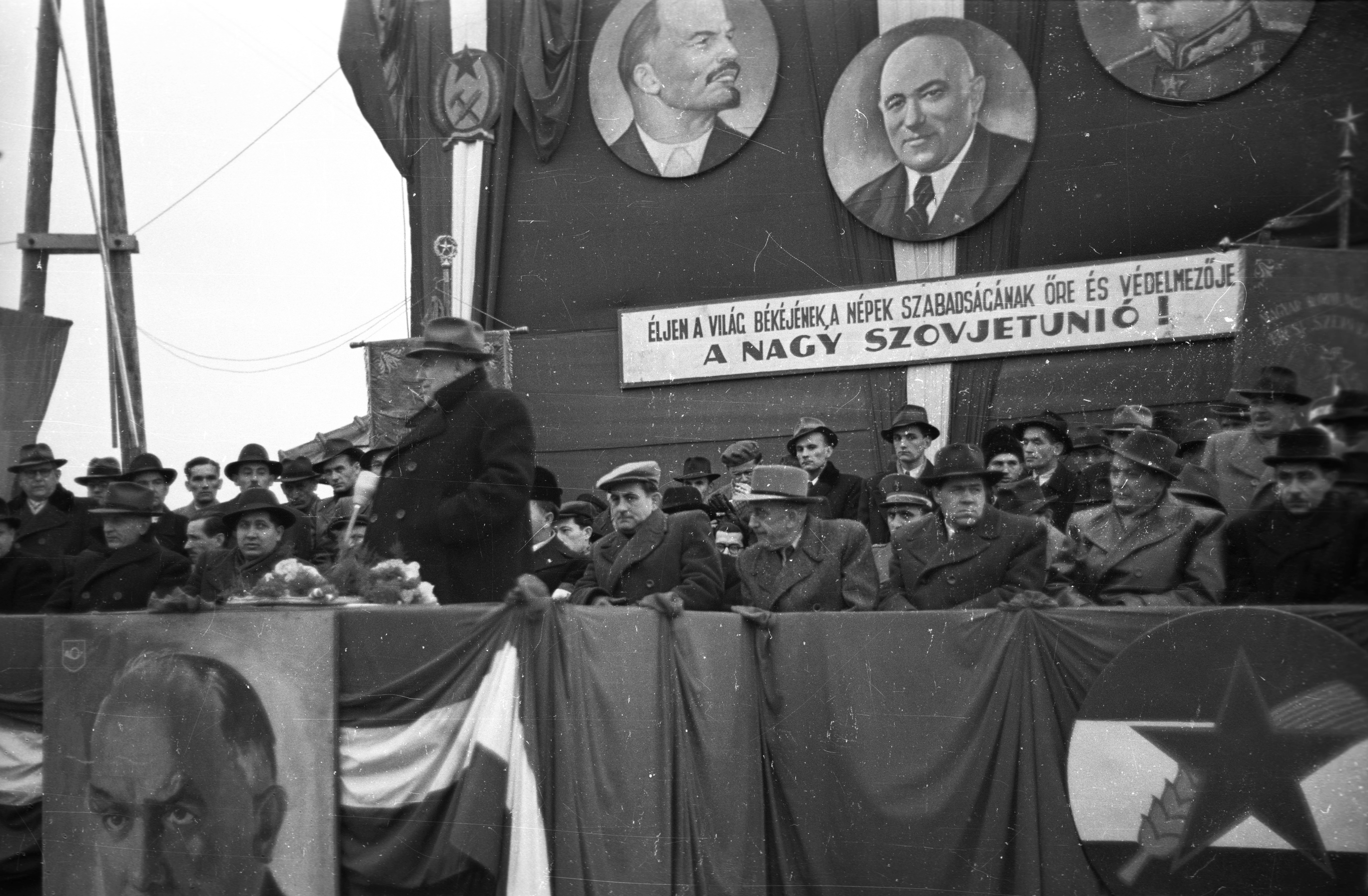
The inauguration ceremony of the section of the 6th main road to Dunapentelé, with Lajos Bebrits, Minister of Transport, at the microphone on the platform.

Approximately 350,000 officials and intellectuals were purged under his rule, from 1948 to 1956. Declaring that "he who is not with us is against us," Rákosi arrested, jailed and killed both real and imagined foes in various waves of Stalin-inspired political purges. In August 1952, he also became Prime Minister (Chairman of the Council of Ministers).

However, in June 1953, Rákosi and other party leaders were summoned to Moscow, where the Soviet leadership dressed down their Hungarian counterparts for Hungary's lackluster economic performance. On 13 June 1953, to appease the Soviet Politburo, Rákosi accepted the Soviet model of collective leadership. While he gave up the premiership to Imre Nagy, he retained the office of General Secretary. Nagy favoured a more humane way of governing, which Rákosi vigorously opposed. On 9 March 1955, the Central Committee of the MDP condemned Nagy for "rightist deviation." Hungarian newspapers joined the attacks and Nagy was blamed for the country's economic problems. On 18 April, the National Assembly unanimously sacked Nagy from his post. Although the Kremlin frowned on a return of Rákosi to the premiership, he and Nagy's successor, András Hegedüs, quickly put the country back on its previous Stalinist course.

=== Economic policy ===
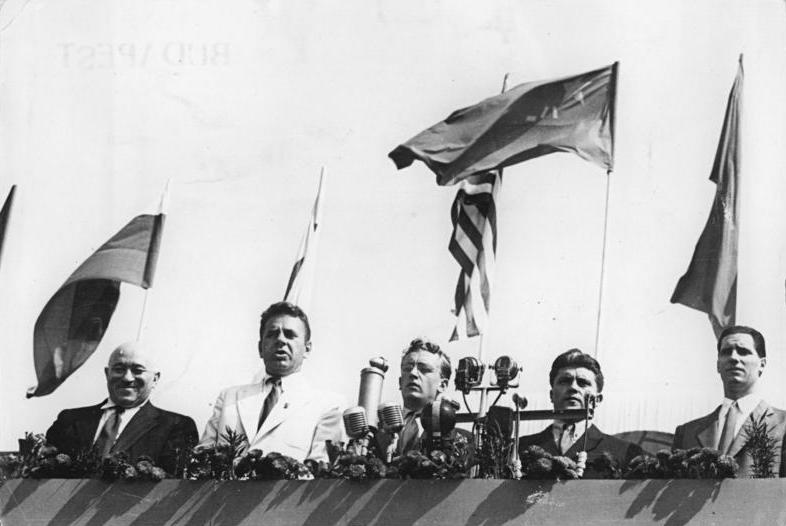
Rákosi during the 2nd World Festival of Youth and Students in Budapest, 1949

The post-war Hungarian economy faced several challenges. The most important was the destruction of infrastructure in the war (40% of national wealth, including all bridges, railways, raw materials, machinery, etc.). Hungary agreed to pay war reparations totalling approximately US$300 million, to the Soviet Union, Czechoslovakia and Yugoslavia, and to support Soviet garrisons.

The Hungarian National Bank in 1946 estimated the cost of reparations as "between 19 and 22 percent of the annual national income." In spite of this, after the highest historical rate of inflation in world history, a new, stable currency was successfully introduced in August 1946 on the basis of the plans of the Communist Party and the Social Democratic Party. The low production of consumer goods and the backwardness of light industry resulted in frequent shortages, especially in the countryside, leading to discontent. In addition, the huge investments in military sectors after the outbreak of the Korean War further reduced the supply of consumer goods. Due to shortages, forced savings (state bond sales to the population) and below-inflation wage increases were introduced.

== Forced retirement ==
After Stalin's death, the positions of his favourite protegés, such as Rákosi, Bierut and Gottwald, were drastically weakened in Moscow.

As Lavrenty Beria, his most hostile figure in the Soviet succession struggles, was arrested and executed in December 1953, he began to seize power again and reverse the Moscow-ordered detente and the rehabilitation of the victims of the show trials, and even more repressive measures and trials took place. He did all this by, for example, achieving the position of chairman of the commission set up to investigate the trials of the lawless. Until 1956, he waged a power struggle with Imre Nagy, with varying degrees of success, and he regularly personally tried to discredit him in Moscow. During these years, he also demonstrated his excellent tactical skills, and finally succeeded in having Imre Nagy replaced by his confidant, András Hegedüs.

However, Rákosi's situation during this period was fundamentally different from before 1953 for two reasons. On the one hand, it was no longer Stalin, but Khrushchev, who was at the head of the Soviet Union, so he could not sentence his political opponent Imre Nagy to death in a show trial. On the other hand, after 1953, people experienced a much more livable version of communism. Thus, for many, Imre Nagy represented a real, legitimate – and most importantly, within the communist system – alternative. This, in turn, fundamentally weakened the party and the dictatorship based on the one-party system and one leader.

Following his resignation in April 1955, Imre Nagy wrote a letter on 4 May, in which he called the criticism against him partisan and fair, but the PB (Central Leadership/Politbureau of Hungarian Communist Party MDP) rejected it, considering it insufficient. Imre Nagy then began to record his views and experiences, and in nineteen and then five more studies he expressed his opinion on certain political, economic and theoretical issues. These texts primarily contained criticism of the accusations against him, but he also formulated the fundamentals of "Hungarian socialism" and his intention to return to the new phase of 1953. After they were completed, he lent them to nearly a hundred people to read, which significantly contributed to the formation of the group that formed around him. In addition, he regularly appeared at cultural events and walked around the city center several times, so many Budapest residents could meet him. More and more people from the political and intellectual world, who had once again become supporters of the Prime Minister after 1955, visited his apartment. First, Géza Losonczy, Sándor Haraszti, Miklós Vásárhelyi, Miklós Gimes, György Fazekas, then Szilárd Újhelyi, Pál Lőcsei, Tibor Méray, Tibor Déry, Zoltán Zelk, Lajos Kónya, László Benjámin and Tamás Aczél also visited him. In June 1956, on his 60th birthday, nearly fifty people visited him.

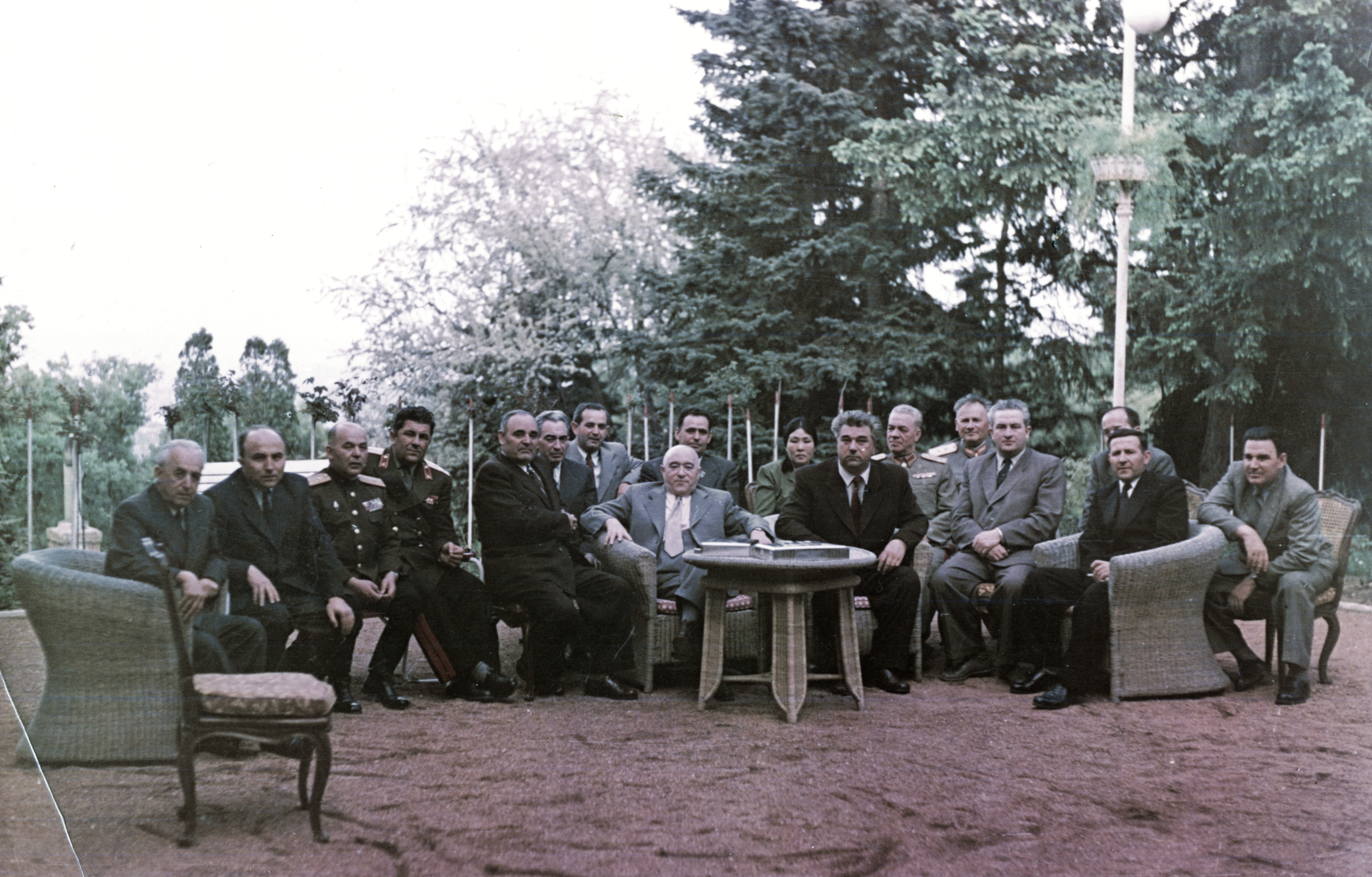
Elite party members meeting. From the left, the second is András Hegedüs, the fifth is Gheorghe Gheorghiu-Dej, the General Secretary of the Romanian Communist Party, the sixth is Ernő Gerő, next to/behind him is Antal Apró, in the middle is Mátyás Rákosi, behind him is István Hidas, the lady is Mátyás Rákosi's wife, in front is Valko Chervenkov, the General Secretary of the Bulgarian Communist Party, Prime Minister, from the right is Emil Bodnăraș, Romanian Army General, Yuri V. Andropov ambassador of USSR (became party leader in 1983)

Rákosi was then removed as General Secretary of the Party under pressure from the Soviet Politburo in June 1956 (shortly after Nikita Khrushchev's Secret Speech), and was replaced by his former second-in-command, Ernő Gerő. To remove him from the Hungarian political scene, the Soviet Politburo exiled Rákosi to the Soviet Union later in 1956, with the official story being that he was "seeking medical attention". His deputy, Ernő Gerő became his successor until 23 October 1956.

=== Process of his fall ===
An opposition within the system began to form more and more firmly behind the former Prime Minister, which first made its voice heard in the autumn of 1955: the figures of cultural life sent a memorandum to the Central Leadership of the MDP dated 18 October 1955. In it, they raised their voice against the repeated restrictions on cultural life: "as we see with deep concern, certain organs and functionaries of the party are increasingly resorting to the harmful, violent means repeatedly condemned by the Central Leadership and the Congress. This re-emerging practice, which violates the valid resolutions of our party, stands in sharp contrast to the principled, decisive, generous, calm cultural policy, which takes the most distant account of the specifics of cultural and educational work, which is being pursued in the Soviet Union.

Further important changes were brought about by the 20th Congress of the CPSU, convened on 14 February 1956. At first, only official reports about this appeared in the domestic press. However, on 25 February, Khrushchev's secret speech was delivered, in which he clearly criticized and condemned the illegalities carried out by Stalin:

Stalin formulated the concept of the 'enemy of the people'. […] This concept made it possible to use the most merciless reprisals against anyone who disagreed with Stalin on any issue, violating all norms of revolutionary legality.

The speech soon became known in its entirety in Hungary through unofficial channels.

Khrushchev's open confrontation with Stalin's crimes further complicated Rákosi's situation. This first became apparent at the March 1956 meeting of the Central Committee of the Hungarian Democratic Party, when several people began to debate Rákosi's report. As a way of avoiding the situation, at Kádár's suggestion, Mihály Farkas was made responsible for the lawlessness in Hungary, after Gábor Péter. However, this did not stop the process and the party leadership began to be criticized more and more openly, referring to what was said at the 20th Congress. Not only in party organizations, but also in the Writers' Union, as well as in articles in Irodalmi Újság, Béke és Szabadság, Szabad Ifjúság, Magyar Nemzet and Művelt Nép. In addition, the Petőfi Circle, established during the time of Imre Nagy, was revived, where public issues were increasingly discussed. The most significant debate on freedom of the press was held on 28 June 1956. On this occasion, several people demanded the return of Imre Nagy to power, shouting "Back to the party!", but he consciously stayed away from all party events.

Rákosi also sensed the change in his situation and did not remain idle. The extraordinary meeting of the MDP on 30 June also discussed "right-wing deviants" and at that time Prime Minister András Hegedüs proposed the initiation of criminal and judicial proceedings. The totalitarian nature of the dictatorship is also shown by the fact that the MDP secretariat meeting on 2 July passed a resolution to list those who participated in welcoming Imre Nagy and those soldiers who applauded during the Petőfi Circle debates. In addition to domestic political movements, however, a change in the international political situation was also necessary for the ouster of Rákosi. In 1955, Hungary was admitted to the UN. The Soviet Union, surrounded by hostile military blocs – in addition to NATO, METO and SEATO – had no other escape route than Yugoslavia. Therefore, Khrushchev "went on a pilgrimage" to Tito in Belgrade and they settled the relations between the two countries. At that time, the settlement of Hungarian-Yugoslav relations would have been necessary, but Rákosi was the main obstacle to this for Tito.

However, whatever the discussions within the party, and whatever the international situation, everyone was aware that Rákosi's replacement could only be carried out on Soviet orders. To this end, communist leaders in contact with the Budapest ambassador, Andropov, also urged this step. The first chance for change opened up on 7 June 1956, when Mikhail Suslov arrived in Budapest. However, he believed that replacing Rákosi would be a "gift to the enemy", so he did not take any steps to this end. Then, a letter was written by Gábor Péter, who was in prison, in which he also named Rákosi as responsible for the unlawful show trials. Less than a month later, another Soviet envoy arrived, Anastas Mikoyan, who was already sent with the instruction that

Rákosi's situation should be eased in connection with the Rajk case.

Rákosi clearly sensed that something was being prepared against him when the MDP Central Committee returned his report to him for revision on 12 July. Then Mikoyan arrived and suggested that Rákosi be replaced. He named the bad Yugoslav relations as a possible reason for this in his memoirs.

“It flashed through my mind that Mikoyan’s suggestion might have been influenced by the fact that Tito demanded my head.” This was stated at the next meeting of the Central Committee and then discussed at the meeting of the Central Committee on July 18, 1956.

The Central Leadership, having established the merits of Comrade Mátyás Rákosi in the Hungarian and international workers’ movement […] agrees with the contents of Comrade Rákosi’s letter and, based on his own request, relieves him of his membership in the Political Committee and the position of First Secretary of the Central Leadership.”

Because of "health reasons"(similar reasoning was with Khrushchev's case in 1964), Rákosi was taken to the Soviet Union within a few days and was never allowed to return to Hungary.

The revolution in Hungary soon erupted on 23 October 1956, and all image of Rákosi destroyed.

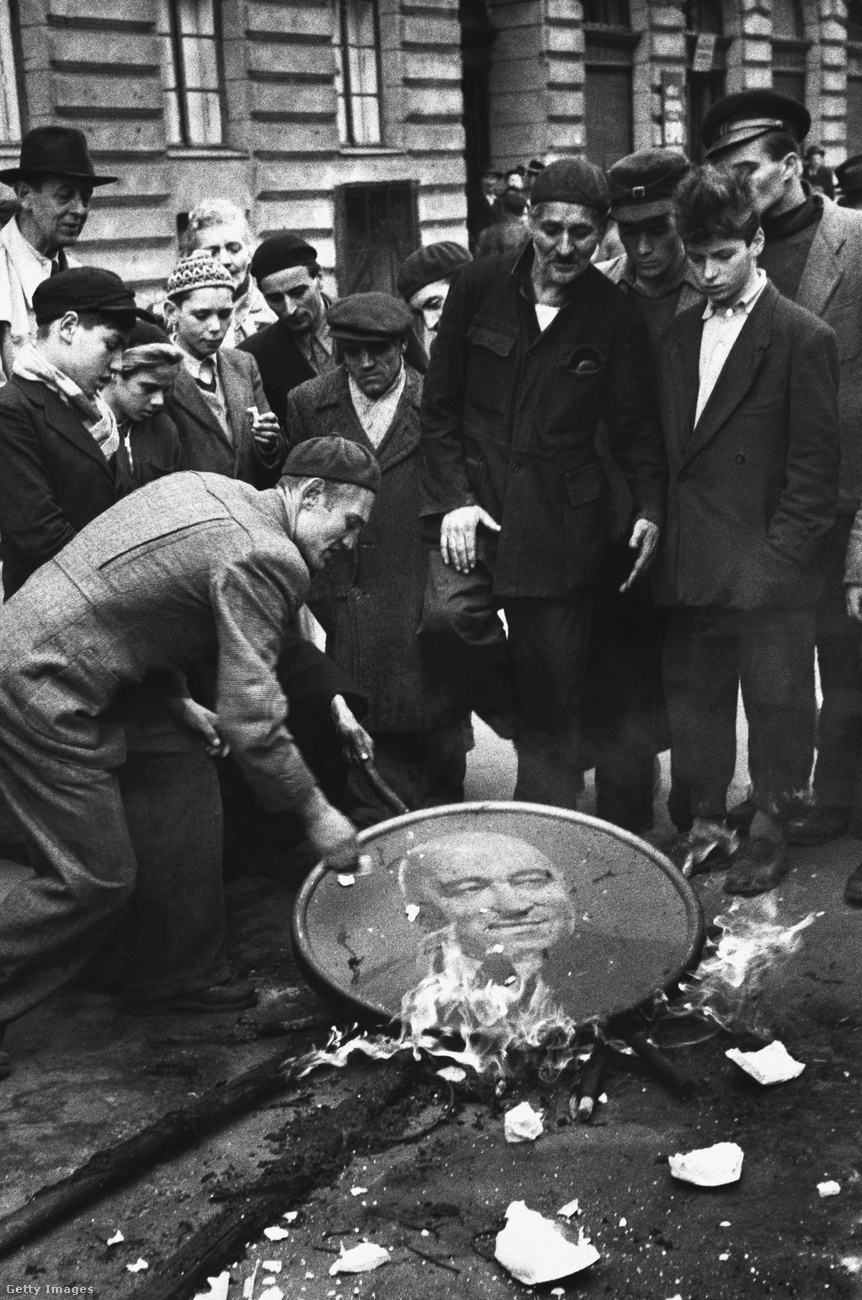
Burning image of Mátyás Rákosi during the revolution on October in 1956

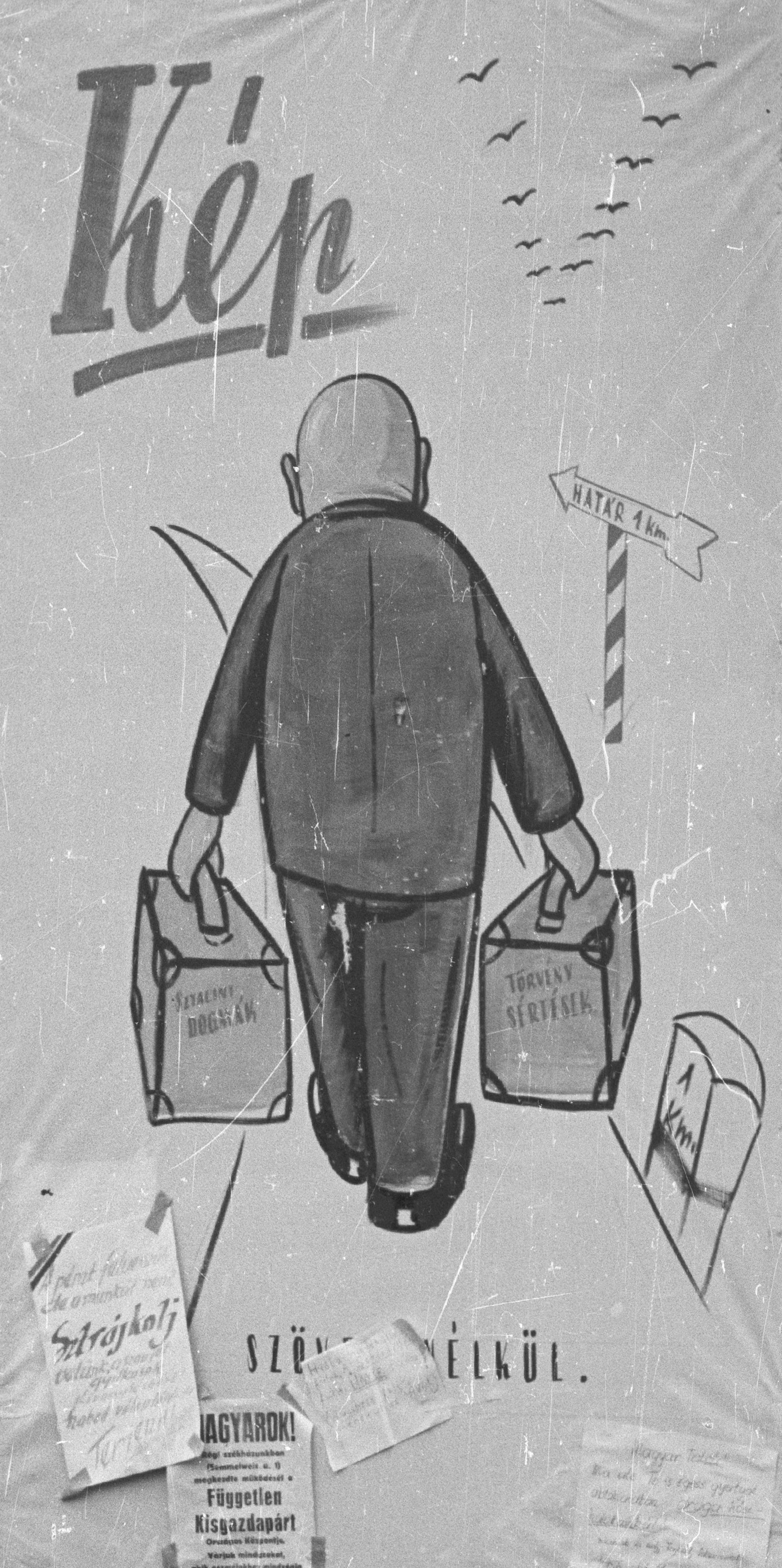
A mocking cartoon about exile of Rákosi during the revolution in 1956

=== Exile ===
János Kádár, the new communist leader of Hungary, refused to let him back to Hungary. Kádár, who came to power after the repression of the 1956 revolution, identified Rákosi's personality cult as one of the root causes of the "counter-revolution". Khrushchev and later Brezhnev agreed with him and soon extradited Rákosi outside of Moscow far from the Soviet Politburo members to prevent any lobby attemption for the sake of Rákosi. On 9 May 1957, the National Assembly of Hungary stripped him off the membership in the Presidential Council and the parliamentary mandate. From 1964 to 1968 he lived in the town of Tokmok in Soviet Kirghizia (modern day Kyrgyzstan) where he became a manager in a wallpaper factory. Later Rákosi was sent to Arzamas and, later to Gorky.

In 1970, he was finally granted permission to return to Hungary if he promised not to engage in political activities. He refused the deal and remained in the USSR where he died in Gorky in 1971. After his death, his ashes were privately returned to Hungary for burial in the Farkasréti Cemetery in Budapest. Only his initials are visible on his gravestone to avoid vandalism.

== Legacy ==
Historian Victor Sebestyen summed up Rákosi as one of the most tyrannical rulers of the twentieth century:

The man Stalin chose as his viceroy in Budapest was Mátyás Rákosi. His crimes are little known outside Hungary. Had he acted on a bigger stage he would now be recognized as one of the greatest monsters of the twentieth century, despite competition from so many challengers. In nearly a decade of power he murdered and jailed as many Hungarians, proportionately, as his patron managed in the Soviet Union. He fascinated, repelled and terrified his subjects in equal measure.

== Writings ==
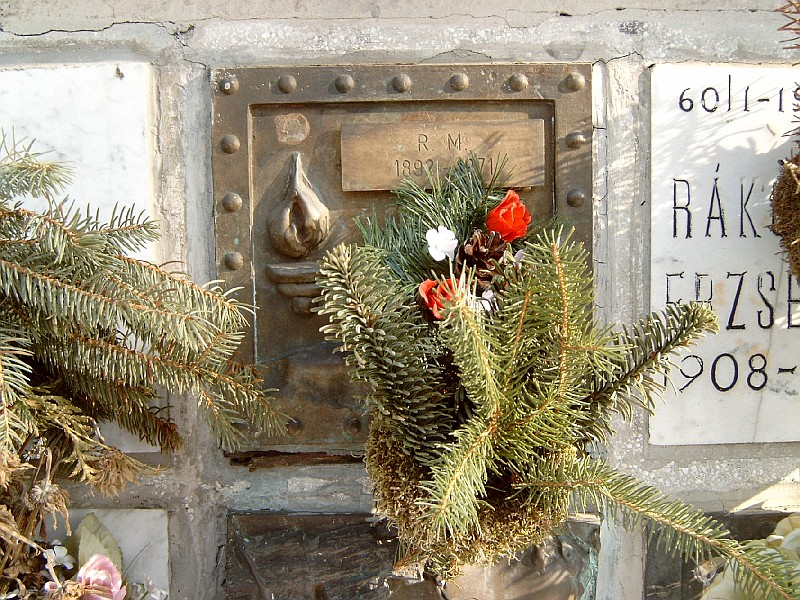
Rákosi's grave in Budapest

Articles

- Hungarian Imperialists and German Fascism, p.68-72, World Survey: A Periodical Review of International Affairs, Workers Library Publishers, NYC, 1942
- Problems of Ideological and Theoretical Work in the Communist Party of Hungary, p.615-618, Political Affairs, Vol. XXVII, No.7, July, 1948
- The Road of our People's Democracy, p.1-39, Hungarian News & Information Service, London, June 1952
- Hungary's Economic Policy, p.1-20, Hungarian News & Information Service, London, July 11, 1953
- Report to the Second Congress of the Hungarian Working People's Party, p.1-28, Hungarian News & Information Service, London, February 25, 1951
- Report on Work and Future Tasks of the Party on Behalf of the Central Committee, Third Congress of the Hungarian Working People's Party, p.1-19, Hungarian News & Information Service, London, May 24-30, 1954
- At the Introduction of the Budget for 1953 in the National Assembly, p.1-34, Hungarian Bulletin, December 15, 1952

== Honours and awards ==
=== National honours ===
- Grand Cross with Chain of the Order of Merit of the Hungarian Republic (1947)
- Kossuth Order of Merit, 1st Class (1948)
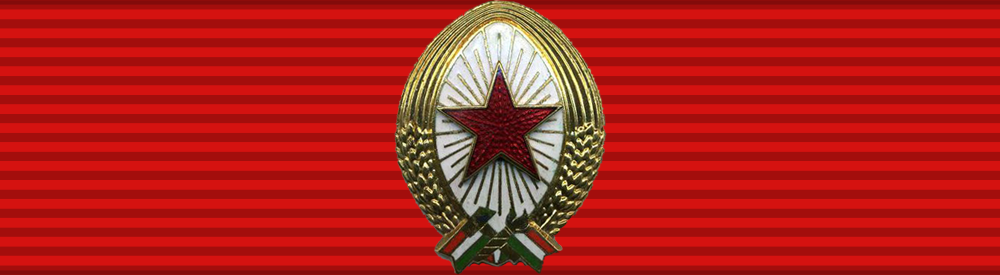
- Order of Labour (1950)
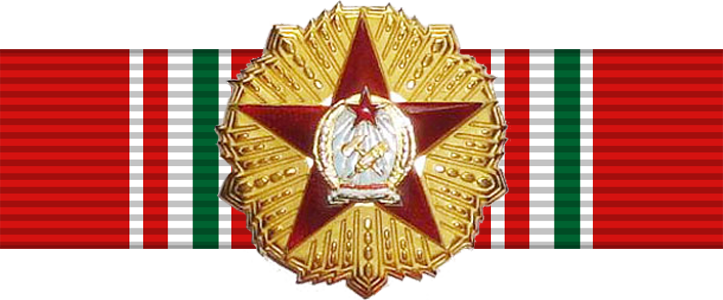
- Order of Merit of the Hungarian People's Republic, 1st Class (1950)

== Sources ==
- Apor, Balázs (2017). The Invisible Shining: The Cult of Mátyás Rákosi in Stalinist Hungary, 1945-1956. Central European University Press. ISBN 978-963-386-192-9. JSTOR 10.7829/j.ctt1zqrmzm.
- Martin Mevius (2011). "A Crown for Ráákosi: The Vogeler Case, the Holy Crown of St Stephen, and the (Inter)national Legitimacy of the Hungarian Communist Regime, 1945––1978". The Slavonic and East European Review. 89 (1): 76. doi:10.5699/slaveasteurorev2.89.1.0076.
- Sebestyen, Victor (2006). Twelve Days: The Story of the 1956 Hungarian Revolution. New York: Pantheon. pp. 340. ISBN 0-375-42458-X.

Party political offices
Preceded by various factions	General Secretary of the Hungarian Communist Party; 23 February 1945 – 12 June 1948	Succeeded by —
Preceded by —	General Secretary of the Hungarian Working People's Party; 12 June 1948 – 18 July 1956	Succeeded by Ernő Gerő
Political offices
Preceded by position established	Minister of State alongside others 15 November 1945 – 5 September 1949	Succeeded by Ernő Gerő
Preceded by Jenő Szöllősi	Deputy Prime Minister of Hungary alongside Árpád Szakasits (1946–1948); 4 February 1946 – 14 August 1952	Succeeded by Ernő Gerő; Imre Nagy; István Hidas; Károly Kiss; Árpád Házi
Preceded by István Dobi	Prime Minister of Hungary; 14 August 1952 – 4 July 1953	Succeeded by Imre Nagy
