= Janza =

Janza is a surname. Notable people with the surname include:

- Erik Janža (born 1993), Slovenian footballer
- Honour Janza, Zambian football coach
- Károly Janza (1914–2001), Hungarian military officer and politician
