= Árpád Szabó =

Hungarian politician (1878–1948)

Minister of Agriculture of Hungary
- In office 24 September 1947 – 16 April 1948
- Preceded by: Károly Bárányos
- Succeeded by: István Dobi

Personal details
- Born: 31 December 1878 Erzsébetváros, Kingdom of Hungary, Austria-Hungary
- Died: 31 July 1948 (aged 69) Rákoshegy (now part of Budapest), Second Hungarian Republic
- Party: FKGP
- Profession: politician

Árpád Szabó (31 December 1878 – 31 July 1948) was a Hungarian politician, who served as Speaker of the National Assembly of Hungary in 1947 and Minister of Agriculture between 1947 and 1948.

He taught in Mezőberény since 1901. He became head of the local National Council on 14 November 1918. In 1930 he was a founding member of the Independent Smallholders, Agrarian Workers and Civic Party. He served as representative in the National Assembly from 1945 until his death. He was appointed legislative speaker for a short time in 1947.

Political offices
Preceded by Béla Varga	Speaker of the National Assembly; 1947	Succeeded by Imre Nagy
Preceded by Károly Bárányos	Minister of Agriculture; 1947–1948	Succeeded by István Dobi
