= József Györe =

Hungarian politician (1902–1985)

Minister of the Interior of Hungary
- In office 14 November 1952 – 4 July 1953
- Preceded by: Árpád Házi
- Succeeded by: Ernő Gerő

Personal details
- Born: 16 November 1902 Budapest, Kingdom of Hungary
- Died: 28 March 1985 (aged 82) Budapest, Hungarian People's Republic
- Party: Hungarian Communist Party, Hungarian Worker's Party, MSZMP
- Profession: politician

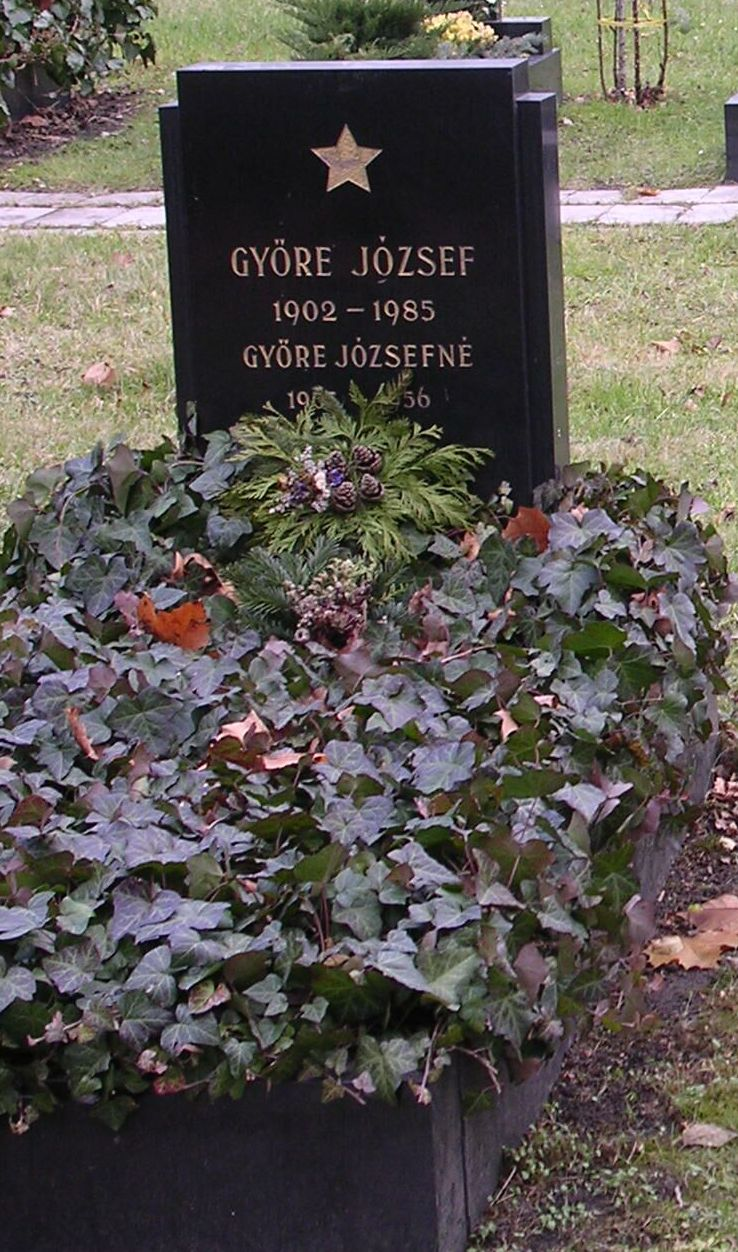
The grave of József Györe

József Györe (16 November 1902 – 28 March 1985) was a Hungarian communist politician, who served as Interior Minister between 1952 and 1953.

Political offices
Preceded by Árpád Házi	Minister of the Interior; 1952–1953	Succeeded by Ernő Gerő
