= András Toma =

Hungarian soldier and WWII Russian POW (1925–2004)

- Born: Toma András; 5 December 1925; Újfehértó, Hungary
- Died: 30 March 2004 (aged 78); Nyíregyháza, Hungary
- Other name: András Tamás
- Military career
- Allegiance: Kingdom of Hungary
- Branch: Royal Hungarian Army
- Service years: 1944–2000
- Rank: Sergeant major (főtörzsőrmester)
- Conflicts: World War II; Budapest Offensive

András Toma (5 December 1925 – 30 March 2004) was a Hungarian soldier taken prisoner by the Red Army in 1944, then discovered living in a Russian psychiatric hospital in 2000. He was most likely the last prisoner of war from the Second World War to be repatriated.

Because Toma never learned Russian and nobody at the hospital spoke Hungarian, he had apparently not had a single conversation in over 50 years, a situation of great interest for the fields of psychiatry and psycholinguistics.

== Early life ==
Toma was born on 5 December 1925, in the village of Újfehértó, eastern Hungary. He lived in the hamlet of Sulyánbokor, near Nyíregyháza, where he worked as a blacksmith's apprentice. He had two younger half-siblings through his father, a brother named János and a sister named Anna, who were 12 and 18 years younger than him, respectively.

== Military service ==
He was drafted into the Royal Hungarian Army in October 1944, during WWII, and he served in an artillery regiment. Later that year, while fighting near Auschwitz, Toma was captured by Soviet forces at the age of 19, and was transported to a prisoner of war camp east of Leningrad (now Saint Petersburg). Following the closure of the camp in 1947, he was transferred to a mental hospital in Kotelnich, Russia, where he was diagnosed with psychoneurosis. Since those in hospitals were removed from prisoner of war lists, Toma was lost to Hungarian authorities. He was declared dead in 1954.

Toma lived in the hospital for the next 53 years under the name András Tamás, where he was unable to communicate with others due to his inability to speak Russian. In 1997, a Slovakian doctor named Karol Moravčík who spoke Hungarian visited the hospital, and identified him as Hungarian. On 11 August 2000, Toma arrived back in Hungary where authorities attempted to identify him. 82 families came forward, thinking he was their missing relative. On 16 September 2000, he returned to his hometown of Sulyánbokor, where he was reunited with his siblings; they were later confirmed through DNA matching. Since he was never discharged, Toma was promoted to sergeant major by the Minister of Defence, and since his military service had been continuous, his decades of accumulated unpaid salary were paid in full. Toma, then aged 74, moved in with his half-sister Anna, who cared for him until his death in 2004. He was buried with military honours.

== See also ==
- Japanese holdout, category of Imperial Japanese soldiers who continued fighting for years after the end of World War II.
