= László Piros =

Hungarian politician and military officer

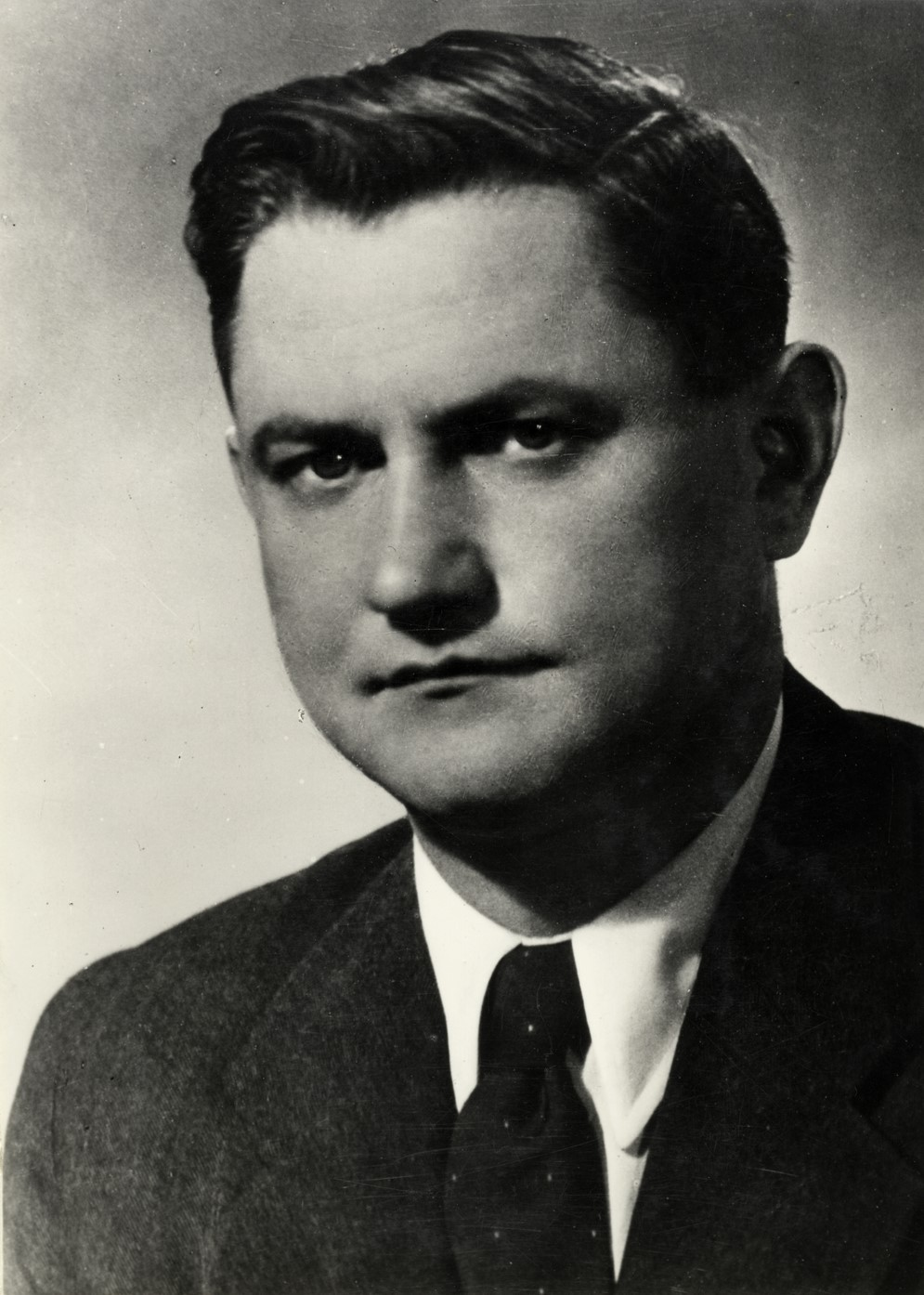

Minister of the Interior of Hungary
- In office 6 June 1954 – 27 October 1956
- Prime Minister: Imre Nagy András Hegedüs Imre Nagy
- Preceded by: Ernő Gerő
- Succeeded by: Ferenc Münnich

Head of the State Protection Authority
- In office 1953–1956
- Preceded by: Gábor Péter
- Succeeded by: Mátyás László

Personal details
- Born: 10 May 1917 Újkígyós, Austria-Hungary
- Died: 13 January 2006 (aged 88) Szeged, Hungary
- Party: Hungarian Socialist Workers' Party
- Other political affiliations: Hungarian Communist Party; Hungarian Working People's Party
- Profession: politician

László Piros (10 May 1917 – 13 January 2006) was a Hungarian communist politician and military officer, who served as Interior Minister between 1954 and 1956.

== Career ==
Piros was born in to an impoverished peasant family. He fought in the Second World War, but he was captured by the Soviets at Voronezh (January 1943). After that he took part in the antifascist movements. Piros worked as a partisan during the end of the war. He was a member of the Provisional National Assembly. From 1950 to 1953 he served as the commander of the Border Guard of Hungary.

Following the arrest of Gábor Péter, Piros led State Protection Authority (ÁVH) from 1953. As Interior Minister he reexamined the previous years' show trials.

During the Hungarian Revolution of 1956 he left the country along with Ernő Gerő and András Hegedüs for the Soviet Union on 28 October, but returned to the country on 3 November. On 10 November, at the request of Hungarian dictator János Kádár, he was sent back to the Soviet Union, and he was stripped of his parliamentary mandate on 9 May 1957. He was allowed to return again to Hungary in August 1958.

From September 1958 he was chief engineer and from 1969 the director of the Pick Szeged salami factory. After his retirement in 1977 Piros served as chairman of the Csongrád County Council of Trade Unions for many years.
