= István Bata =

Hungarian politician

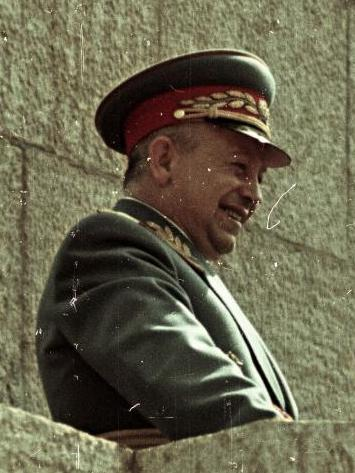
- Gen. István Bata in 1955

Minister of Defence
- In office 4 July 1953 – 26 October 1956
- Preceded by: Mihály Farkas
- Succeeded by: Károly Janza

Personal details
- Born: 5 March 1910 Tura, Austria-Hungary
- Died: 17 August 1982 (aged 72) Budapest, People’s Republic of Hungary
- Party: Hungarian Working People's Party
- Other political affiliations: Social Democratic Party of Hungary

Military service
- Rank: Lieutenant General

István Bata (5 March 1910 – 17 August 1982) was a Hungarian military officer and politician who served as Minister of Defence from 1953 to 1956.

== Biography ==
A factory worker, Bata joined the Social Democratic Party of Hungary in 1930. He was arrested in 1942 by the police for his political activities and was under supervision.

After the end of the Second World War, from 1945 he became a member of the Central Management of the Public Employees' Trade Union, and then became the site manager of Budapest Metropolitan Transport Company. From 1947 to 1949 he was a student at the Moscow Military Academy. In 1950, he was appointed Air Defense Commander and then Chief of Staff. From 1951 he was an alternate member of the Central Executive of the Hungarian Working People's Party and from 1953 he was a full member. From 4 July 1953 to 24 October 1956 he was Minister of Defense. In this capacity in 1955 he was a member of the Warsaw Pact to the signatory Hungarian delegation.

During the 1956 Hungarian Revolution, he was one of the creators of the Soviet operation under the pseudonym "Wave" (Whirlwind), which was enacted in order to, “restore social peace in Hungary,” by then-Soviet Ambassador Yuri Andropov. Bata divided Budapest into three military districts and gave an order to defeat the revolution.

On 26 October 1956 Bata was relieved of all of his functions. Three days later he escaped to the Soviet Union. He negotiated with János Kádár and wanted to organize a military dictatorship after the fall of the revolution. On 16 November Bata was expelled from the party because of his past pro-Stalin stance. Later, he returned to Hungary, where he worked for the Budapest Transport Company.

Political offices
Preceded by Mihály Farkas	Minister of Defence; 1953-1956	Succeeded by Károly Janza
