= Gábor Péter =

Hungarian politician (1906–1993)

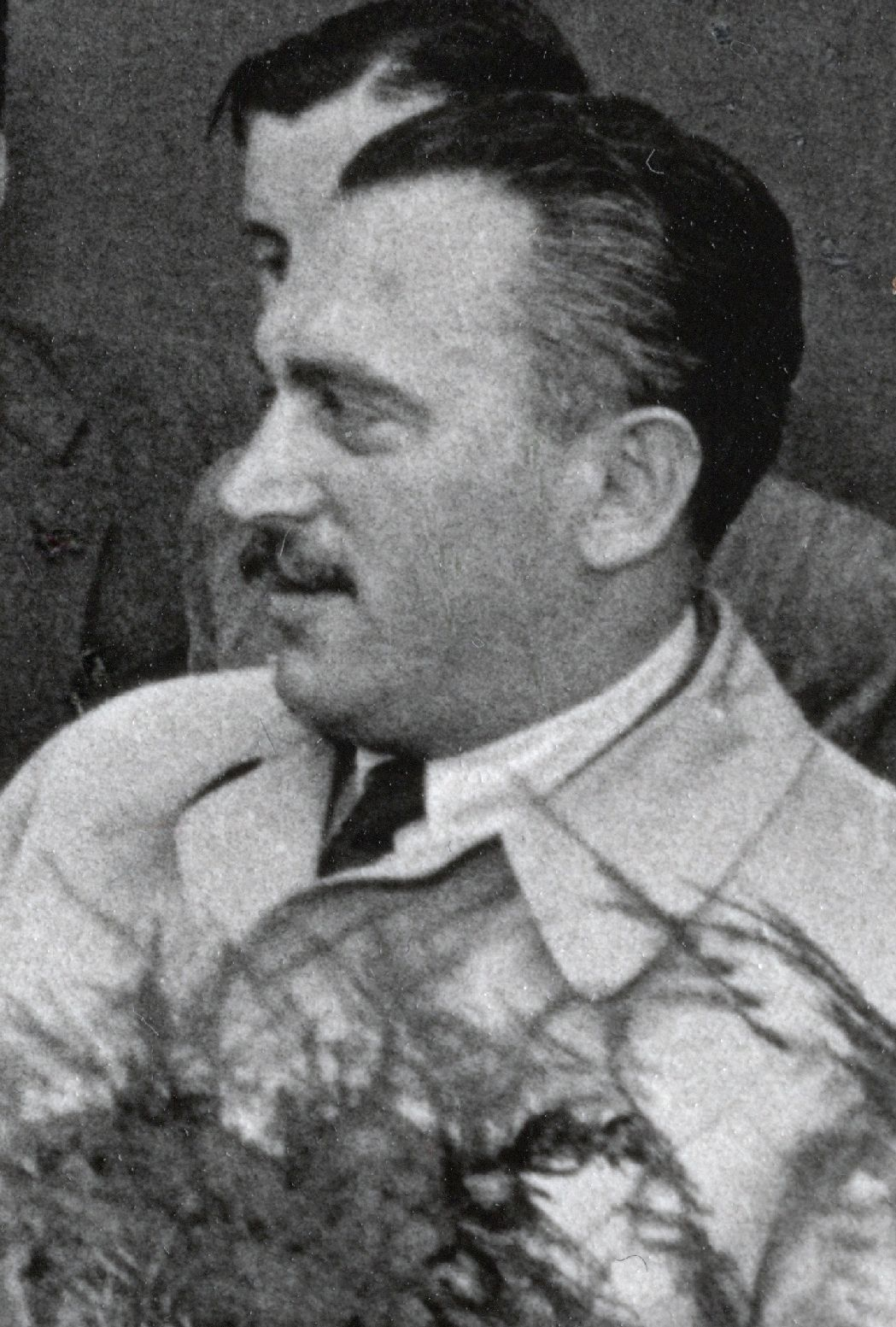

Head of the State Protection Authority
- In office 1945–1953
- Preceded by: Position established
- Succeeded by: László Piros

Personal details
- Born: 14 May 1906 Újfehértó, Austria-Hungary
- Died: 26 January 1993 (aged 86) Budapest, Hungary
- Party: Hungarian Working People's Party
- Other political affiliations: Hungarian Communist Party
- Profession: Politician

Gábor Péter (born Benjámin Eisenberger; 14 May 1906 in Újfehértó – 23 January 1993 in Budapest) was a Hungarian communist politician. Between 1945 and 1952 he was chief of the State Protection Authority (Államvédelmi Hatóság, ÁVH), and as such responsible for much brutality and many political purges.

== Early life ==
Péter was born Benjamin Eisenberger to Péter Eisenberger, a Jewish tailor, and Róza Meczner, in Újfehértó, Hungary. Originally employed as a tailor, he took part in the labour movement from the early 1920s, and joined the Hungarian Communist Party in 1931. During the 1930s, Péter was active in the Hungarian section of the International Red Aid and as a trade union organizer. At this time he was also a lover of Litzi Friedmann, the future first wife of Kim Philby, a member of the Cambridge Five.

== Career ==
In January 1945, Péter was appointed leader of the Budapest Department of the State Political Police (PRO), the Hungarian secret police. Péter's career rose quickly; he became chief of the Hungarian State Police State Defense Department (ÁVO) and its successor, the State Protection Authority (ÁVH).

In 1952, coinciding with the height of the anti-cosmopolitan campaign in the Soviet Union, he was discharged from his position. Later he was arrested in Mátyás Rákosi's villa. According to historian Tibor Zinner, Gábor Péter was present on an official visit when, unexpectedly, a handcuff clicked on his hand put back. After that Mihály Farkas stepped forward from behind the curtain and said: "the game is over". Gábor Péter's wife, Jolán Simon, who served as Rákosi's secretary, was also arrested.

In 1954, a court martial sentenced him to life imprisonment. He was accused of being a Zionist spy and cooperating with László Rajk, Rudolf Slánský and other "agents of international Zionism". In 1957, his term of imprisonment was reduced to 14 years, and in 1959 he was released under an individual amnesty. He later worked as a librarian.

== Death ==
On 23 January 1993, at the age of 86, Péter died of natural causes in a Budapest hospital. He was nearly blind. He was survived by his wife, Jolán Simon.

== Honours and awards ==
=== National honours ===
- Order of Merit of the Hungarian Republic (1949)

=== Foreign honours ===
- (Czechoslovakia) Grand Officer of the Order of the White Lion (1949)

== Sources ==
- Gábor Péter's birth entry Újfehértó births, No. 1906/173.
- Müller, Rolf (2017). Az erőszak neve: Péter Gábor [The Name of Violence: Gábor Péter] (in Hungarian). Jaffa Kiadó. ISBN 978-615-5715-72-3.

Political offices
Preceded by office established	Head of State Protection Authority; 1945–1952	Succeeded by László Piros
