= István Csala =

Hungarian politician (1899–1987)

Minister of Agriculture of Hungary
- In office 10 December 1948 – 11 June 1949
- Preceded by: István Dobi
- Succeeded by: Ferenc Erdei

Personal details
- Born: 2 November 1899; Cegléd, Kingdom of Hungary, Austria-Hungary
- Died: 21 March 1987 (aged 87); Cegléd, People's Republic of Hungary
- Political party: FKGP
- Profession: politician

István Csala (2 November 1899 – 21 March 1987) was a Hungarian politician, who served as Minister of Agriculture between 1948 and 1949.

Political offices
Preceded by István Dobi	Minister of Agriculture; 1948–1949	Succeeded by Ferenc Erdei
