= MKP =

MKP or mkp may refer to:

== Codes ==
- Moikodi, a language of New Guinea (ISO 639-3: mkp)

== Organizations ==
- The ManKind Project, a non-profit international educational organization
- Miles Kelly Publishing, an independent children's publishing company based in Essex, UK

=== Political parties ===
- Party of the Hungarian Coalition (Hungarian: Magyar Koalíció Pártja), a political party in Slovakia, for the Magyar (i.e. ethnic Hungarian) minority
- Hungarian Communist Party (Hungarian: Magyar Kommunista Párt), a former Hungarian political party
- Maoist Communist Party (Turkish: Maoist Komünist Partisi), a clandestine communist organization in Turkey
- Maurin Kiribati Pati, a political party in Kiribati
- Mazdoor Kisan Party, a communist party in Pakistan
- uMkhonto weSizwe Party, a political party in South Africa

== Science and technology ==
- MAP kinase phosphatase (with MAP standing for mitogen-activated protein), an enzyme (see also: MAP kinase)
- Metallized plastic polypropylene (German: Metallisierter Kunststoff Polypropylen), a type of plastic-film capacitor
- Monobasic potassium phosphate, another name for monopotassium phosphate (KH_{2}PO_{4}). The K comes from Latin kalium, which means potassium. Not to be confused with magnesium potassium phosphate (MgKPO_{4}), a type of quick setting cement.
- Multidimensional knapsack problem, a problem in combinatorial optimization
- Kilopondmetre, a unit of torque

== People ==
- MKP is used to refer to Starcraft 2 progamer MarineKing, formerly known as MarineKingPrime
