= Károly Bárányos =

Hungarian politician (1892–1956)

Minister of Agriculture of Hungary
- In office 20 November 1946 – 24 September 1947
- Preceded by: István Dobi
- Succeeded by: Árpád Szabó

Personal details
- Born: 23 April 1892 Betlen, Kingdom of Hungary
- Died: 5 August 1956 (aged 64) Budapest, People's Republic of Hungary
- Party: FKGP
- Profession: politician

Károly Bárányos (23 April 1892 – 5 August 1956) was a Hungarian politician, who served as Minister of Agriculture between 1946 and 1947.

Political offices
Preceded by István Dobi	Minister of Agriculture; 1946–1947	Succeeded by Árpád Szabó
