= Károly Janza =

Hungarian military officer and politician

- Born: 11 April 1914; Budapest, Kingdom of Hungary
- Died: 21 June 2001 (aged 87); Budapest, Hungary
- Military career
- Service years: 1949–1958
- Rank: Lieutenant General

Károly Janza (11 April 1914 – 21 June 2001) was a Hungarian military officer and politician, who served as Minister of Defence during the Hungarian Revolution of 1956. He tried to get the insurgents to the capitulation but he could not achieve this.

Political offices
Preceded by István Bata	Minister of Defence; 1956	Succeeded by Pál Maléter
