= Abaújszántó =

- Town
- Flag Coat of arms

- Location of Abaújszántó
- Coordinates: 48.27852°N 21.18752°E
- Country: Hungary
- County: Borsod-Abaúj-Zemplén
- District: Gönc

Area
  - Total: 47.36 km^{2} (18.29 sq mi)

Population (2008)
  - Total: 3,202
  - Density: 67.6/km^{2} (175/sq mi)
- Time zone: UTC+1 (CET)
  - Summer (DST): UTC+2 (CEST)
- Postal code: 3881
- Area code: (+36) 47
- Website: www.abaujszanto.hu

Abaújszántó (Hungarian pronunciation: [ˈɒbɒuːjˈsaːntoː]) is a small town in Borsod-Abaúj-Zemplén county, Northern Hungary, about 40 kilometres (25 miles) from the county seat Miskolc. It belongs to the famous Tokaj-Hegyalja wine district.

== Name ==
The Abaúj- prefix refers to its location in Abaúj County, while -szántó, meaning "plower" refers to agriculture.

== History ==
Abaújszántó has been inhabited since ancient times. The Hungarians settled down in the area around the Conquest of Hungary. It was a town for more than 600 years, the centre of the Gönc district until 1921 and the largest town of the region after Kassa. It lost its town status in 1902, and in many ways its role was taken over by Encs. It was the centre of the Abaújszántó district from 1921 till 1962.

Many famous men had connections with Abaújszántó, the poet Ilosvai Selymes Péter worked here as a schoolmaster, and Gáspár Károli, who translated the Bible to Hungarian, lived nearby, and the Protestant pastors of Abaújszántó helped him in his translating work. The esperantist poet and translator Kálmán Kalocsay was also born in Abaújszántó.

Before World War II, there was a large Jewish community of about 681 Jews. The community was annihilated by the Nazis in the Holocaust.

Abaújszántó was granted town status again in 2004.

== International relations ==
=== Twin towns – Sister cities ===
Abaújszántó is twinned with:

- Košice, Slovakia, since 2009

== Notable people ==
- Mihály Farkas (1904–1965), Hungarian communist politician and Minister of National Defense
