= Árpád Házi =

Hungarian politician (1908–1970)

Minister of the Interior of Hungary
- In office 20 April 1951 – 14 November 1952
- Preceded by: Sándor Zöld
- Succeeded by: József Györe

Personal details
- Born: 20 September 1908 Komádi, Austria-Hungary
- Died: 13 November 1970 (aged 62) Budapest, Hungary
- Political party: MKP, MDP, MSZMP
- Profession: politician
- Awards: Kossuth Prize

Árpád Házi (20 September 1908 – 13 November 1970) was a Hungarian communist politician, who served as Interior Minister between 1951 and 1952.

== Biography ==
Born into a working-class family, Házi worked as a tailor's assistant and was a member of the Hungarian Association of Tailors and Workers where he organised strikes and demonstrations. Házi was also involved with the Hungarian Red Aid and eventually joined the Hungarian Communist Party in 1929.

Házi was secretary of the KMP illegal party cells in various districts in Budapest. In 1936 he was arrested and released in 1937.

He joined the KMP organization in Kispest, and in 1941 he became a member of the executive committee. He controlled the communist organizations in the outer areas of Budapest. From 1942 he organised underground resistance fighters and carried out sabotage against the occupying forces.

After the war he became deputy governor of the Pest-Pilis-Solt-Kiskun County and a delegate to the Provisional National Assembly. In 1946 he became a member of the central committee and politburo of the KMP.

In 1949 he was appointed head of the State Audit Office, which he chaired until May 1951.In May 1951, he was elected a member of the Secretariat of the Hungarian Working People's Party.

Házi was a member of the Presidential Council of the Hungarian People's Republic and served as the Minister of Interior from 1951 to 1952 and from November, 1953 to July, Deputy Chairman of the Council of Ministers. From July, 1953 to 1955 and from August, 1955, again President of the State Audit Office, from August, 1956 until October 24, he was Minister of State Audit.

From 1956 to 1957 he was the secretary of the MDP Pest County Party Committee. From 1957 ti 1963 a secretary of the Pest County Committee of the Hungarian Socialist Workers' Party.

He retired in 1964 to become the Commercial, Joinery and Metal Industrial Company director.

Political offices
Preceded by Sándor Zöld	Minister of the Interior; 1951–1952	Succeeded by József Györe
