= Sándor Rónai =

Hungarian politician

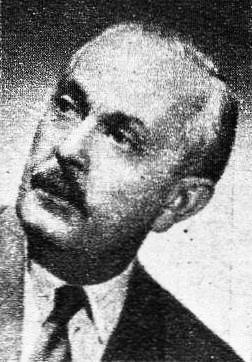

Chairman of the Presidential Council of the People's Republic of Hungary
- In office 8 May 1950 – 14 August 1952
- Prime Minister: István Dobi
- Preceded by: Árpád Szakasits
- Succeeded by: István Dobi

Personal details
- Born: 6 October 1892 Miskolc, Austria-Hungary
- Died: 28 September 1965 (aged 72) Budapest, Hungary
- Party: MSZDP; MDP; MSZMP

Sándor Rónai (6 October 1892 – 28 September 1965) was a Hungarian communist political figure. He served as Chairman of the Hungarian Presidential Council between 1950 and 1952 and as Speaker of the National Assembly of Hungary from 1952 to 1963.

Political offices
Preceded by Árpád Szakasits	Chairman of the Hungarian Presidential Council; 1950–1952	Succeeded by István Dobi
Preceded by Imre Dögei	Speaker of the National Assembly; 1952–1963	Succeeded by Erzsébet Metzker Vass
