= Brezov =

- Municipality
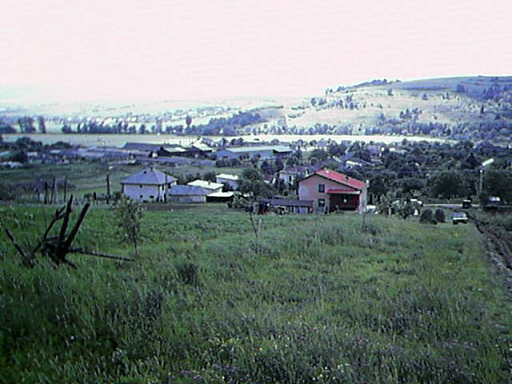

- Flag

- Location of Brezov in the Prešov Region Location of Brezov in Slovakia
- Coordinates: 49.15°N 21.50°E
- Country: Slovakia
- Region: Prešov Region
- District: Bardejov District
- First mentioned: 1335

Area
  - Total: 6.89 km^{2} (2.66 sq mi)
- Elevation: 190 m (620 ft)

Population (2025)
  - Total: 324
- Time zone: UTC+1 (CET)
  - Summer (DST): UTC+2 (CEST)
- Postal code: 870 1
- Area code: +421 54
- Vehicle registration plate (until 2022): BJ
- Website: brezov.sk

Brezov (Hungarian: Nyírjes) is a village and municipality in Bardejov District in the Prešov Region of north-east Slovakia.

== History ==
In historical records, the village was first mentioned in 1335. Before the establishment of independent Czechoslovakia in 1918, Brezov was part of Sáros County within the Kingdom of Hungary. From 1939 to 1945, it was part of the Slovak Republic. On 18 January 1945, the Red Army dislodged the Wehrmacht from Brezov and it was once again part of Czechoslovakia.

== Geography ==
The municipality lies at an altitude of 190 metres (620 ft) and covers an area of 6.89 km^{2} (2.66 sq mi) (2025).

== Population ==
Population statistic (10 years)
Year	1995	2005	2015	2025
Count	404	417	382	324
Difference		+3.21%	−8.39%	−15.18%

Population statistic
Year	2024	2025
Count	333	324
Difference		−2.70%

It has a population of 324 people (31 December 2025).

=== Ethnicity ===
Census 2021 (1+ %)
Ethnicity	Number	Fraction
Slovak	354	95.93%
Not found out	15	4.06%
Rusyn	7	1.89%
Total	369	

In year 2021 was 369 people by ethnicity 354 as Slovak, 15 as Not found out, 7 as Rusyn, 3 as Czech, 1 as Ukrainian, 1 as Russian and 1 as German.

Note on population: The difference values of population numbers in the table "Population statistic" and in the sections "Ethnicity" & "Religion" is caused by the use of various statistical methods.

=== Religion ===
Census 2021 (1+ %)
Religion	Number	Fraction
Roman Catholic Church	297	80.49%
Evangelical Church	30	8.13%
Greek Catholic Church	14	3.79%
None	14	3.79%
Not found out	12	3.25%
Total	369	

In year 2021 was 369 people by religion 297 from Roman Catholic Church, 30 from Evangelical Church, 14 from Greek Catholic Church, 14 from None, 12 from Not found out, 1 from Calvinist Church and 1 from Ad hoc movements.

== See also ==
- List of municipalities and towns in Slovakia
