= Cherechiu =

Cherechiu Kiskereki
- Commune
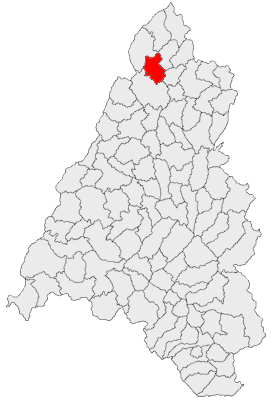
- Cherechiu in Bihor County

- Location in Romania
- Coordinates: 47.3833°N 22.15°E
- Country: Romania
- County: Bihor

Government
  - Mayor (2020–2024): Alexandru Niri (UDMR)
- Area: 53.86 km^{2} (20.80 sq mi)
- Elevation: 107 m (351 ft)
- Population (2021-12-01): 2,248
  - Density: 42/km^{2} (110/sq mi)
- Time zone: EET/EEST (UTC+2/+3)
- Postal code: 417175
- Area code: +(40) x59
- Vehicle reg.: BH
- Website: cherechiu.ro

Cherechiu (Hungarian: Kiskereki) is a commune in Bihor County, Crișana, Romania with a population of 2,248 as of 2021. It is composed of three villages: Cherechiu, Cheșereu (Érkeserű), and Târgușor (Asszonyvására).

The commune is situated at an altitude of 107 m (351 ft), on the banks of the river Sânnicolau. It is located in the northern part of Bihor County, 22 km (14 mi) west of the city of Marghita and 48 km (30 mi) north of the county seat, Oradea.
