= Mihály Farkas =

Hungarian politician (1904–1965)

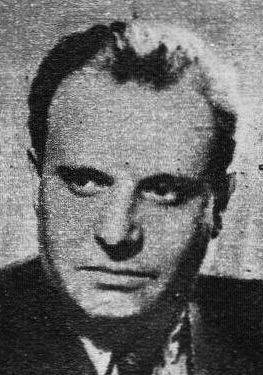

Minister of Defence
- In office 10 September 1948 – 4 July 1953
- Preceded by: Péter Veres
- Succeeded by: István Bata

Personal details
- Born: Hermann Lőwy; 18 June 1904 Abaújszántó, Austria-Hungary
- Died: 6 December 1965 (aged 61) Budapest, Hungary
- Resting place: Farkasréti Cemetery
- Political party: MKP, MDP, MSZMP
- Children: Vladimir Farkas

Mihály Farkas (born Hermann Lőwy; 18 July 1904 – 6 December 1965) was a Hungarian Communist politician who served as Minister of National Defense of the Hungarian People's Republic.

== Biography ==
He was born in 1904 in Abaújszántó to Jewish parents, in the Abaúj-Torna County of the Kingdom of Hungary, and became a Communist in the 1920s. He lived in Košice and Prague then. He fought in the Spanish Civil War; later he moved to the Soviet Union. He returned to Hungary in late 1944 alongside other Hungarian communists and became a member of the Central Committee, the Political Committee and the Secretariat of the Hungarian Communist Party from May 1945. In 1945 he became under-secretary of Home Affairs. In 1946 he was elected deputy secretary and became the chairman of the party's Management Committee.

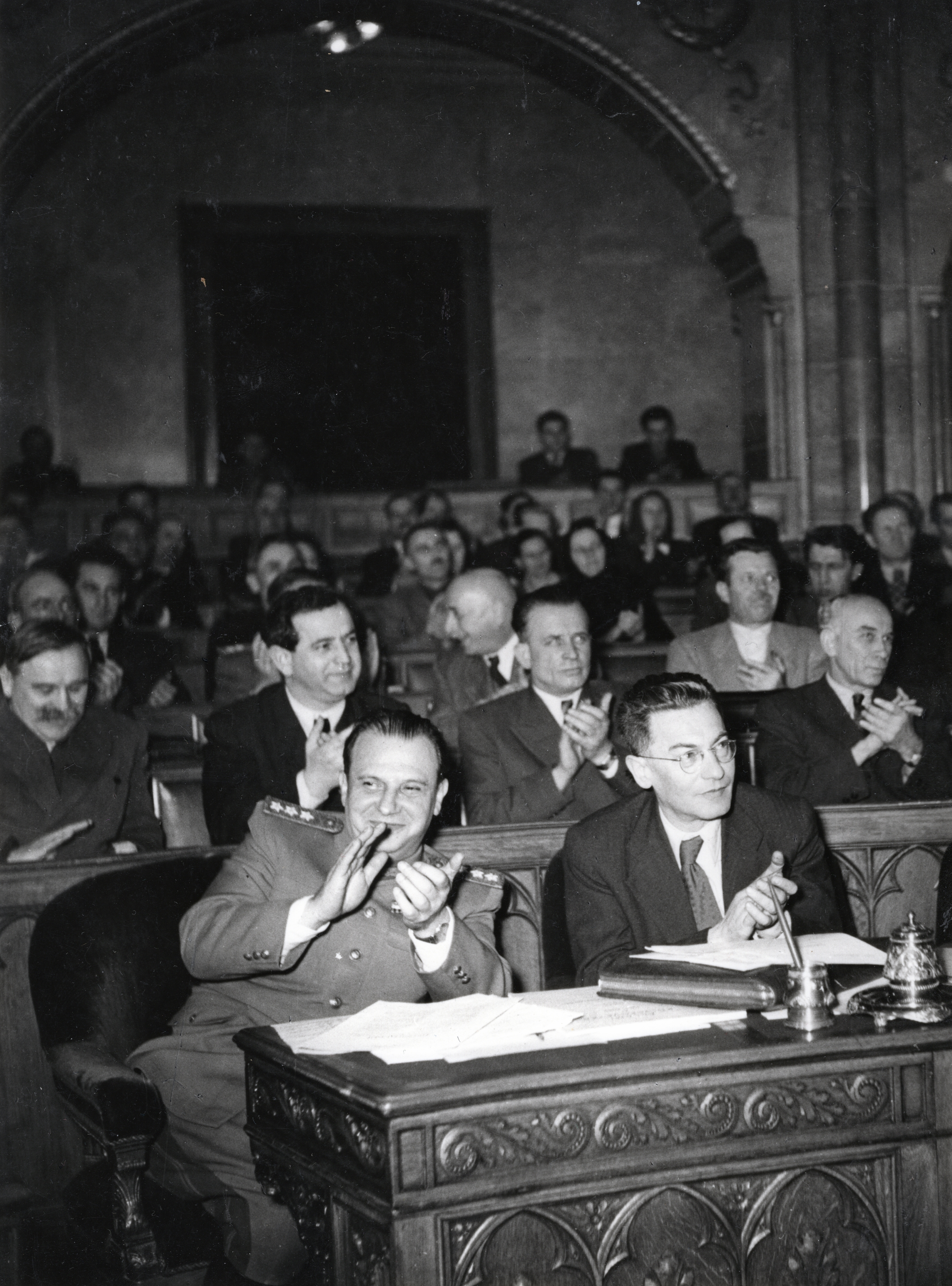
Farkas with Józef Révai in the parliament, 1950

He was Minister of National Defence from 9 September 1948 to 2 July 1953. He was one of the main instigators during the Rákosi era. In 1956 he was expelled from the party and convicted. He was released from prison in 1961 and spent his last years working as an editor and publisher in Budapest, where he died in 1965.

His son Vladimir was a colonel of the security police during the Rákosi era.

== Awards ==
- Order of the Hungarian People's Republic 1st and 2nd Classes (1949)
- Order of the Freedom Silver Class (1945) and Golden Class (1946)
- Order of Kossuth 1st Class (1950)
- Medal for Public Security Silver Grade (1947, awarded for the services as Ministry of the Interior State Security)
- 1848-1948 Commemorative Medal
- Medal "For the Victory Over Germany in the Great Patriotic War 1941–1945"
- Merit of the Star of the Garibaldi Brigade (1945)
- Military Order of the White Lion 2nd Class (1945)

== Sources ==
- Magyar Életrajzi Lexikon 1000–1990

Political offices
Preceded by Péter Veres	Minister of Defence; 1948–1953	Succeeded by István Bata
