= István Dobi =

Hungarian politician (1898–1968)

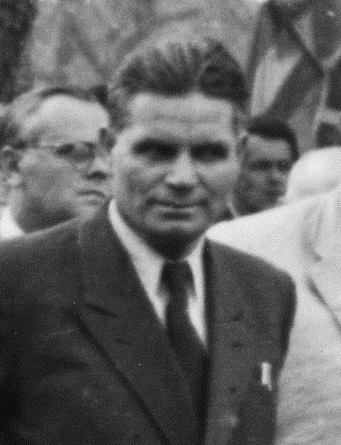
- Dobi in 1948

Chairman of the Presidential Council of the People's Republic of Hungary
- In office 14 August 1952 – 14 April 1967
- Chairman of the Council of Ministers: Mátyás Rákosi; Imre Nagy; András Hegedüs; Imre Nagy; János Kádár; Ferenc Münnich; János Kádár; Gyula Kállai
- Preceded by: Sándor Rónai
- Succeeded by: Pál Losonczi

Prime Minister of Hungary (Note: Chairman of the Council of Ministers of the People's Republic of Hungary from 20 August 1949)
- In office 10 December 1948 – 14 August 1952
- President: Árpád Szakasits
- Chairman of the Presidential Council: Árpád Szakasits Sándor Rónai
- Deputy: Mátyás Rákosi
- Preceded by: Lajos Dinnyés
- Succeeded by: Mátyás Rákosi

Minister of Agriculture
- In office 23 February 1946 – 20 November 1946
- Prime Minister: Ferenc Nagy
- Preceded by: Béla Kovács
- Succeeded by: Károly Bárányos
- In office 16 April 1948 – 10 December 1948
- Prime Minister: Lajos Dinnyés
- Preceded by: Árpád Szabó
- Succeeded by: Istvan Csala

Personal details
- Born: 31 December 1898 Szőny, Kingdom of Hungary, Austria-Hungary
- Died: 24 November 1968 (aged 69) Budapest, Hungarian People's Republic
- Party: Independent Smallholders' Party (1916–1949); Hungarian Socialist Workers' Party (1959–1968)

István Dobi (Note: Hungarian pronunciation: [ˈiʃtvaːn ˈdobi]) (31 December 1898 – 24 November 1968) was a Hungarian communist politician who was Prime Minister of Hungary from 1948 to 1952 and Chairman of the Presidential Council of the Hungarian People's Republic from 1952 to 1967.

== Early life ==
Dobi originated from a poor peasant family and was born in Szőny, in the Komárom County of the Kingdom of Hungary. He completed only six years of primary school and started working as a day laborer from an early age. In 1916 he came into contact with the agricultural workers' movement. After having fought in the First World War, he supported the Hungarian Soviet Republic. During the Hungarian–Romanian War of 1919 he was captured by the Romanians.

Upon his release, he worked as a casual laborer and became active in the agricultural workers' union as well as in the Social Democratic Party of Hungary from the early 1920s. For this, he was put under police surveillance. In 1936 he switched to the Independent Smallholders' Party and became a functionary in the Kisalföld Chamber of Agriculture. Although he was not a member of the Communist Party, he was arrested several times during the regency of Miklós Horthy.

== World War II ==
During the war he became one of the leaders of the Hungarian resistance until he was called up for duty, returning in the summer of 1945.

== Post war ==
By the end of World War II he had become a leading member of the Smallholders Party, which achieved a majority in the 1945 general elections. Dobi was a member of the left-wing faction of that party, and advocated cooperation with the communists.

With the Smallholders being a part of Hungary's post-war coalition government, Dobi served as Minister of Agriculture from February 1946 to November 1946 (under prime minister Ferenc Nagy) and again from April 1948 to December 1948 (under Lajos Dinnyés). As a leading member of the Smallholders' left wing, Dobi contributed some much needed legitimacy to a government that was increasingly dominated by Communists. After several splits and the expulsion, arrest or exile of anti-communist members ("salami tactics"), Dobi was elected chairman of the Smallholders Party in June 1947. The party concluded an alliance with the communists, social democrats and National Peasant Party for the rigged 1947 parliamentary election.

Due in part to his support for the Communists, he replaced fellow Smallholder Lajos Dinnyés as prime minister in December 1948, helping preside over the final stage of the Communists' complete takeover of the country. In short order, Dobi removed those elements of his party who were unwilling to do the Communists' bidding, leaving the party in the hands of fellow travelers like himself. This process was also repeated with the other non-Communist parties.

Thus, by the time of the 1949 elections, Hungary was effectively a one-party state. The 1949 elections formalized this status, with voters only having the option of approving or rejecting a Communist-dominated list. One of the first acts of the newly elected National Assembly was to approve a Soviet-style constitution, formally marking the onset of total Communist rule in Hungary. The Smallholders' Party was effectively disbanded.

In terms of allegations of collaboration with the party, the New Hungarian Encyclopedia summed up Dobi's role in the Communist takeover in this way: "Following the ousting of the Smallholders Party right wing elements, he was selected to be president. Under his direction the party was cleansed of its reactionary elements and it became part of the program for building a people's democracy with the Communists."

== Presidency of the People's Republic ==
In 1952, he gave up the prime ministership because Communist Party boss Mátyás Rákosi, the country's de facto leader since 1947, wanted that post for himself. Dobi was then named Chairman of the Presidential Council, making him Hungary's nominal head of state. He remained in this post until his retirement in April 1967. He took on numerous other high-profile roles over the years to eventually become the second or third most powerful man in Hungary. He supported the crushing of the Hungarian Revolution of 1956. Having been a "crypto-communist" for many years, Dobi formally joined the Hungarian Socialist Workers' Party in 1959. He was awarded the Lenin Peace Prize in 1962. He died in Budapest in 1968.

== Honours and awards ==
=== National honours ===
- Grand Cross of the Order of Merit of the Republic of Hungary (1947)
- Order of Kossuth, 1st Class (1948)

=== Foreign honours ===
- (Poland) Grand Cross of the Order of Polonia Restituta (1948)
- (Czechoslovakia) Grand Cross of the Order of the White Lion (1949)
- Star of the Republic of Indonesia (1960)
- (Soviet Union) Lenin Peace Prize (1962)
- (Ethiopia) Order of the Queen of Sheba (1964)

Political offices
Preceded by Béla Kovács	Minister of Agriculture; 1946	Succeeded by Károly Bárányos
Preceded by Árpád Szabó	Minister of Agriculture; 1948	Succeeded by István Csala
Preceded by Lajos Dinnyés	Prime Minister of Hungary; 1948–1952	Succeeded by Mátyás Rákosi
Preceded by Sándor Rónai	Chairman of the Hungarian Presidential Council; 1952–1967	Succeeded by Pál Losonczi
Party political offices
Preceded by Zoltán Tildy	Chairman of the Independent Smallholders' Party; 1947–1949	Succeeded by party dissolved
