= Lajos Walko =

Hungarian politician (1880–1954)

Minister of Foreign Affairs of Hungary
- In office 5 March 1925 – 9 December 1930
- Prime Minister: István Bethlen
- Preceded by: Tibor Scitovszky
- Succeeded by: Gyula Károlyi
- In office 24 August 1931 – 1 October 1932
- Prime Minister: Gyula Károlyi
- Preceded by: Gyula Károlyi
- Succeeded by: Endre Puky

Personal details
- Born: 30 October 1880 Budapest, Austria-Hungary
- Died: 10 January 1954 (aged 73) Visegrád, People's Republic of Hungary
- Party: Unity Party
- Profession: Politician

Lajos Walko (30 October 1880 – 10 January 1954) was a Hungarian politician who served as Minister of Foreign Affairs from 1925–30 and again from 1931–32.

He served as interim Minister of Finance twice and Minister of Trade once. As foreign minister, he played a considerable role in the Horthy administration. Beginning in 1938, he served as the president of the Hungarian Commercial Bank in Budapest.

He studied law in the universities of Leipzig and Berlin.

Political offices
Preceded by Tibor Kállay	Minister of Finance; Acting; 1924	Succeeded by Frigyes Korányi
Preceded by Tibor Scitovszky	Minister of Foreign Affairs; 1925–1930	Succeeded by Gyula Károlyi
Preceded by Gyula Károlyi	Minister of Foreign Affairs; 1931–1932	Succeeded by Endre Puky
