= Gyula Bornemisza =

Hungarian government minister

Baron Gyula Bornemisza de Kászon et Impérfalva

Minister of Foreign Affairs of the Hungarian Counter-Revolutionary Government
- In office 5 May 1919 – 31 May 1919
- Succeeded by: Pál Teleki

Personal details
- Born: 16 December 1873 Kolozsvár, Kingdom of Hungary, Austria-Hungary
- Died: 30 December 1925 (aged 52) Brixen, Kingdom of Italy
- Spouse: Klára Bethlen
- Profession: diplomat

Baron Gyula Bornemisza de Kászon et Impérfalva (Bornemissza; 16 December 1873 – 30 December 1925) was a Hungarian aristocrat and diplomat.

== Life and career ==
Gyula Bornemisza was born into an old Transylvanian noble family of Székely origin, as one of the six children of royal and imperial chamberlain Baron Tivadar Bornemisza (1843–1902) and Baroness Róza Jósika. Gyula and one of his brothers, János studied at the Jesuit school of Stella Matutina in Feldkirch, then the Kalksburg College in Vienna.

In 1919 he was part of the counter-revolutionary government (firstly formed in Arad) under the leadership of Count Gyula Károlyi, which was established to oppose the Hungarian Soviet Republic. In this government he was Minister of Foreign Affairs from 5 May to 31 May. Along with other members of the government, Bornemisza was interned by Romanian authorities to Mezőhegyes between 9 May and 22 May, during the Romanian intervention in Hungary.

In 1920 he became envoy to the embassy of the Imperial Family-in-exile in Switzerland, the actual representation of Hungary in Switzerland. From November 1920 he also officially became the head of the Hungarian diplomatic mission in Switzerland. This he remained until March 1921.

Bornemisza was married to Klára Bethlen de Bethlen at Sarn bei Brixen in 1912, with whom he had four sons and a daughter.
