= Gyula Gömbös =

Prime Minister of Hungary from 1932 to 1936

Vitéz Gyula Gömbös de Jákfa
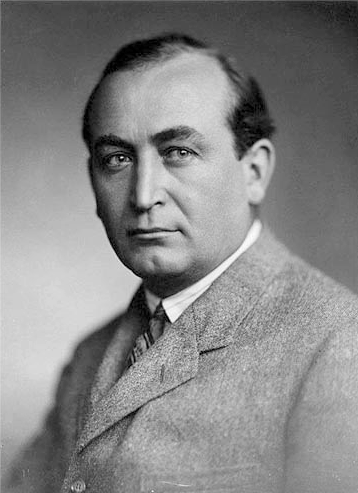
- Gömbös in 1923

Prime Minister of Hungary
- In office 1 October 1932 – 6 October 1936
- Regent: Miklós Horthy
- Preceded by: Gyula Károlyi
- Succeeded by: Kálmán Darányi

Personal details
- Born: 26 December 1886 Murga, Tolna County, Austria-Hungary
- Died: 6 October 1936 (aged 49) Munich, Germany
- Party: Independent Smallholders, Agrarian Workers and Civic Party (1920–1922); Unity Party (1922–1924); Hungarian National Independence Party (1924–1928); Unity Party; (1928–1936)
- Spouse(s): Greta Reichert (first); Erzsébet Szilágyi (second); Greta Reichert (third; again)

Gyula Gömbös de Jákfa (26 December 1886 – 6 October 1936) was a Hungarian military officer and politician who served as the Prime Minister of Hungary from 1932 until his death in 1936.

== Background ==
Gömbös was born in Murga, Tolna County, Kingdom of Hungary, which had a mixed Hungarian and ethnic German population. He was the son of Gyula Gömbös de Jákfa (1858–1921), a member of untitled Hungarian nobility and Maria Weitzel (b.1867). His father was the village schoolmaster. The family belonged to the Hungarian Evangelical (i. e. Lutheran) Church.

Gömbös entered the Austro-Hungarian Army as a cadet in Pécs and quickly became a member of the officer corps, serving as a captain during World War I. In the army, Gömbös became a staunch advocate of Hungary's gaining independence from Austria and a bitter critic of the Habsburgs.

After World War I ended, and Hungary split from Austria, Gömbös joined conservative Hungarian forces in Szeged that were unwilling to support the communist Béla Kun, who had seized control of Hungary in 1919. Gömbös formed his own paramilitary group, the Hungarian National Defence Association (Magyar Országos Véderő Egylet, or MOVE). Gömbös became a close ally of Miklós Horthy, the leader of the anti-communist government in Szeged, and played a leading role in organizing Horthy’s army. For his services, Gömbös was made minister of defence in the Szeged government.

After the Hungarian communist government had been ousted in August 1919, Gömbös helped direct the purge of communists from Hungarian society. Gömbös also supported certain political actions against Hungary's Jews.

== Rightward ==
Gömbös had been a Smallholder before the war but veered sharply to the right in the upheaval following the breakup of Austria-Hungary. After Miklós Horthy was made regent of Hungary in 1920, Gömbös became the primary leader of Hungary’s emerging nationalist movement, which was gaining some support from the people in response to the brief period of communist rule and the signing of the Treaty of Trianon, which had resulted in Hungary losing two thirds of its territory to neighboring nations.

Despite some disagreements with Horthy, Gömbös was active in the widespread purge of Hungarian communists and later organized mass military opposition to the plan of the former Habsburg King, Charles IV, to regain his throne in 1921, a move that kept Horthy firmly in control of Hungary. Later that year, Gömbös became one of the primary leaders of the opposition to Prime Minister István Bethlen. Gömbös was the leader of an avowed anti-Semitic fascist group called the race protectors whose principle line of criticism was attacking Bethen for being far too tolerant towards the Jews. In 1929, Gömbös was made a major general and was appointed Minister of Defense in the Bethlen government by Horthy.

== Premiership ==
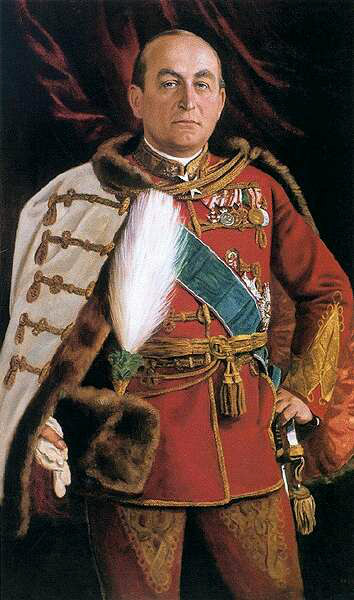
Gömbös in full regalia

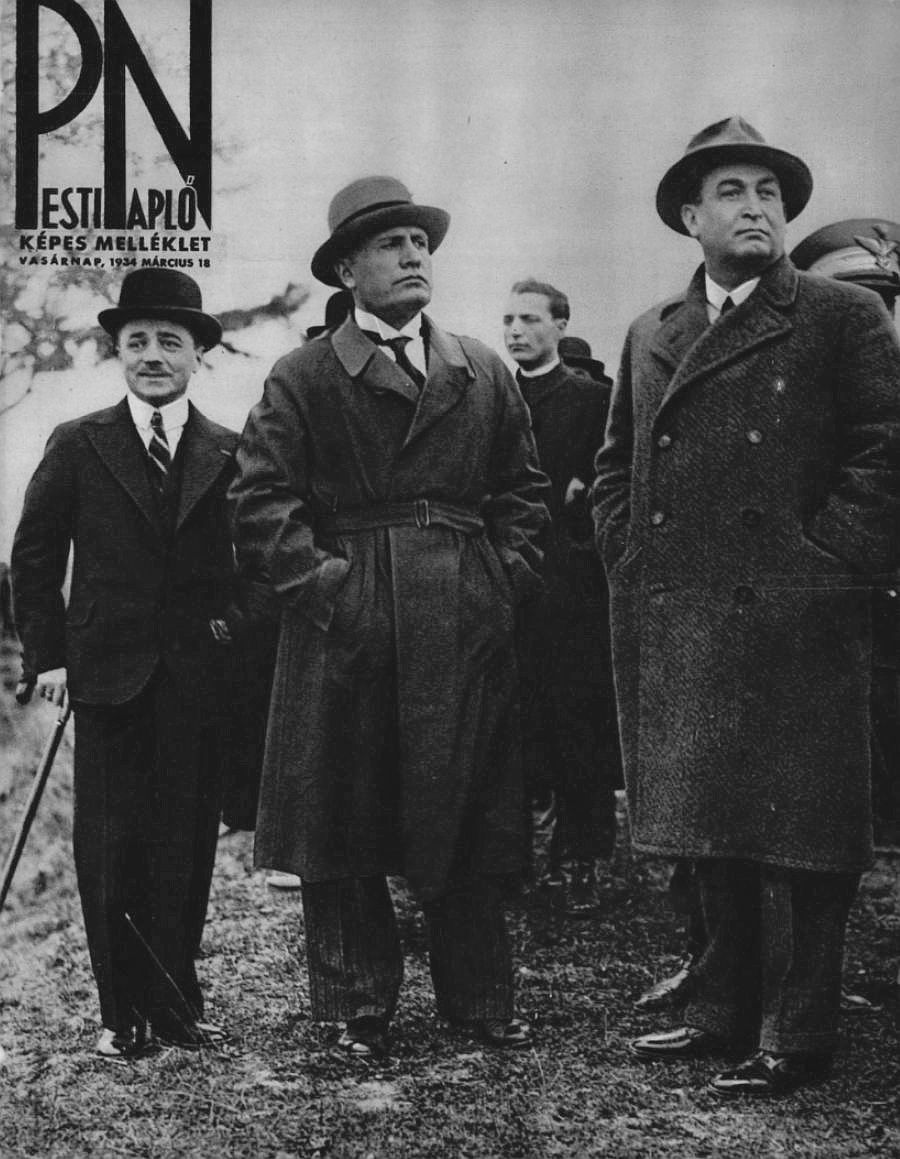
Dollfuss, Mussolini and Gömbös stand together on the cover of a 1934 magazine.

In 1932, Horthy appointed Gömbös prime minister; Gömbös, in turn, acceded to Horthy's urging not to seek new elections. The Great Depression had caused serious unrest in Hungary including strikes and protest marches, made worse by the laws that disfranchised most Hungarians from voting, which led to the charges that the government only cared about the wealthy 28% or so Hungarians whose income levels were high enough to allow them to vote. Horthy had concluded that both Bethlen and his successor, Count Gyula Károlyi, were not tough in crushing the social unrest and appointed Gömbös as prime minister, largely because of his reputation as a "strong man". Gömbös had the image of a man of unusual ability and intelligence, a natural leader whose role in founding the National Army that opposed the Soviet Republic in 1919 was well remembered by Horthy. Horthy had informed Gömbös that he was to govern Hungary via the Unity Party as all prime ministers who served under Horthy did. Bethlen who still had much influence in the Unity Party secretly imposed a number of conditions on Gömbös before he became prime minister such as to govern via parliament and to not pass any racist laws. Bethlen also sought to limit Gömbös's room to maneuverer by placing several of his followers into key positions in Gömbös's cabinet such as Ferenc Keresztes-Fischer as Interior minister and Miklós Kállay as agriculture minister.

Gömbös's appointment as prime minister reflected a generational shift in Hungarian politics. Previous prime ministers under Horthy such as Pál Teleki, István Bethlen and Gyula Károlyi were all aristocrats who grown up in the late 19th century who were all self-proclaimed elitists. Gömbös by contrast was a populist who represented the generation who came of age in the First World War. The war generation turned to be considerably more embittered and angry that the previous generation with the feeling being that their sacrifices in the war were said to have been betrayed by the Jews who were alleged to have caused the defeat of the Austrian empire in 1918. A self-proclaimed fascist Gömbös's political hero and role model was Benito Mussolini. Gömbös copied so much of Mussolini's political style that his nickname in Hungary was "Gombolini". However, unlike Mussolini, Gömbös was not a great speaker. In much the same way that Mussolini sought to identify Fascism with modernity, Gömbös sought to link himself with modernity. Gömbös was the first Hungarian prime minister to give a speech on the radio, which was his first act after being appointed prime minister in 1932, which impressed everyone as a prime minister willing to embrace modern technology. Gömbös always travelled via automobile, train or airplane instead of a horse drawn carriage, and frequently appeared on the newsreels that played in the cinemas, which gave him the image of a prime minister willing to accept the 20th century.

Upon taking office, Gömbös publicly recanted his previous antipathy to Jews. As prime minister, Gömbös was very active in international affairs by seeking support for revising the Treaty of Trianon and pursuing trade deals aimed at reviving the Depression-afflicted economy In November 1932, Gömbös flew to Italy and visited Benito Mussolini. One of his major goals was to align Hungary with an Axis of Italy and Austria. Mussolini conveyed to Gömbös his approval regarding the revision of the Treaty of Trianon. Furthermore, Mussolini promised Gömbös Italy’s aid if Hungary went to war with Yugoslavia and Romania in an attempt to regain Hungary’s former territory from those nations. Upon his return to Budapest, Gömbös held a gigantic rally of the various right-wing "patriotic associations" who marched past him while giving him the fascist salute and shouting "long live our Leader!" while Gömbös returned the fascist salute.

Starting on 11 October 1932, Hungarian universities were rocked by anti-Semitic demonstrations with Christian students complaining that Jewish students made up a disproportionate number of the students in violation of the numerus clausus law of 1920, which had imposed a strict 5% quota on the number of Jewish students allowed to study at any one time. Students complained that Jews made only 6% of the population of Hungary, but were 25% of the students at the University of Debrecen and made up 27% of the students at the medical school at Budapest University. The well organised demonstrations took place at every university in Hungary and were a recurring feature of university life until 1936. Gömbös and his education minister Bálint Hóman came out in support of the demonstrations and met several times in public with the leaders of the protests to declare their support. Gömbös used the demonstrations to discredit Bethlen, charging that he had during his decade as prime minister failed to enforce the numerus clausus law and thereby put the interests of the Jewish minority ahead of the Christian majority. Gömbös used the student demonstrations to win control of the Unity Party by purging pro-Bethlen MPs from the party.

On 30 January 1933, Adolf Hitler was appointed Chancellor of Germany. Gömbös wrote Hitler a letter expressing his approval on his appointment as chancellor and his hope for a Hungarian-German alliance. In June 1933, Gömbös visited Berlin to meet Hitler. Gömbös was disappointed when Hitler told him that he was only willing to support Hungarian revanchism against Czechoslovakia and had no interest in supporting Hungarian claims against Romania and Yugoslavia. Both Romania and Yugoslavia were rich in raw materials such as oil in the case of Romania and bauxite in the case of Yugoslavia that Germany needed for its war machine, and Hitler wanted to draw both Romania and Yugoslavia into the German sphere of influence. Gömbös also wished to maintain Austria as an independent state and was opposed to Hitler's plans for an Anschluss.

Gömbös also formed, with rather greater reluctance, an alliance with Germany. When Adolf Hitler became Chancellor of Germany, Gömbös was the first foreign head of government to visit the Nazi leader. In 1934 Gömbös signed a major trade agreement with Germany in the hope of reducing Hungary's unemployment rate. By 1936, Germany had Hungary's largest trade partner by far and Hungary had fallen into the German economic sphere of influence, which limited the room for maneuver for successive Hungarian prime ministers afterwards as Hungary needed Germany far more economically than Germany needed Hungary. That amity, however, failed to endure. Hitler considered Gömbös to be far too pro-Jewish and made it clear to Gömbös that his support of Hungary had a price. The German dictator voiced willingness to take Hungary's side in any effort that Hungary carried out to regain land from Czechoslovakia, but he would not support Hungary against the territorial ambitions of either Romania or Yugoslavia. Unlike Mussolini, Hitler also resented Gömbös's plans to expand the size and power of the Hungarian military.

Gömbös carried out several social reforms such as a minimum wage for the urban working class and a moratorium on foreclosing on peasants unable to repay their loans to the banks on time, but most of the dramatic social reforms he promised in October 1932 failed to occur. Gömbös started to openly violate the Treaty of Trianon, which had placed restrictions on the Honved (Royal Hungarian Army). Gömbös carried out a major purge of the Honved officer corps in 1934, sacking a number of conservative officers and replacing them with radical officers. By the time Gömbös died in 1936, the majority of the Honved officers were men who supported Gömbös and shared his views, which later had a major impact on Hungary in World War Two. Ferenc Szálasi was one of the officers whom Gömbös promoted and encouraged. When Szálasi left the Honved to pursue his career as a fascist politician, Gömbös gave him the gift of a silver cigarette case engraved with the words "Taliálkounk a barrikádokon! ("We shall meet on the barricades!"). Károly Bartha, Henrik Werth and Döme Sztójay were all officers whose careers were given a major boast by Gömbös. Despite his differences of opinion with Hitler, Gömbös held a profound admiration for Prussian-German militarism and started sending younger Honved officers to be trained in Germany, which was a major reason for so many Honved officers were Germanophiles.

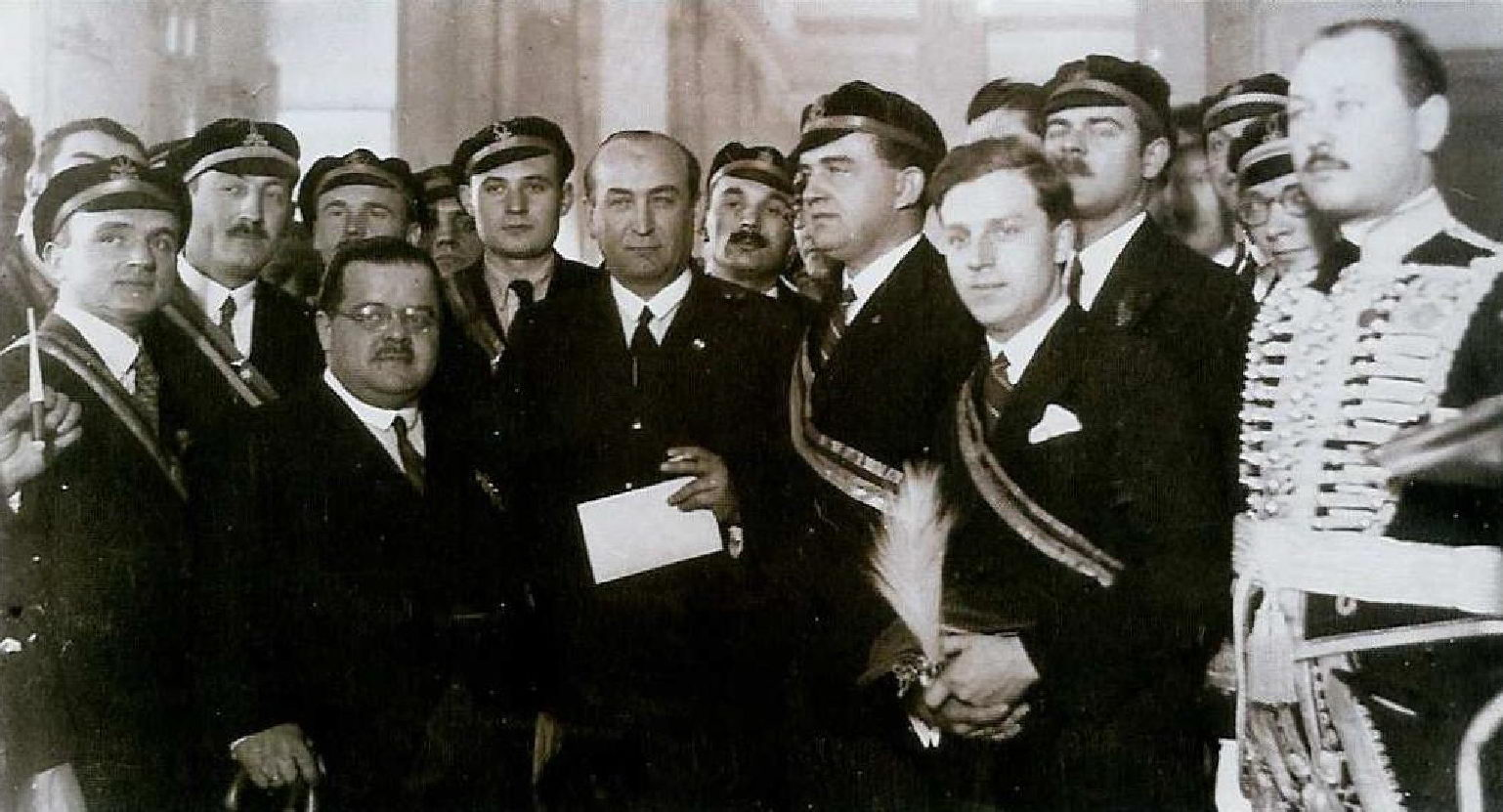
Gömbös meeting with leaders of the Turul Association in 1933. Gömbös held the meeting to show his support for the demand to limit the Hungarian Jews allowed to attend university.

Gömbös governed in an authoritarian style and was accused of moving Hungary by stages into a dictatorship. Like his hero Mussolini, who had been appointed prime minister by King Victor Emmanuel III in 1922 and moved Italy by stages into a fascist dictatorship by 1925, Gömbös operated in a similar fashion. In 1935, he renamed the Unity Party the Party of National Unity. The Unity Party under Bethlen had more of a patronage machine than a proper political party, which Gömbös changed by turning the ruling party into a mass movement consciously modelled after the Grand Fascist Party. Gömbös recruited a number of the radical anti-Semitic university students into the Unity Party under the banner of the "Reform Generation" movement as he presented himself as a reformer out to challenge a corrupt system, which changed the composition of the Unity Party. On 31 January 1935, Gömbös formally launched the Reform Generation movement at a rally in Budapest attended by a thousand university students where the demand was made that Bethlen's political influence over the Unity Party being ended forever. Gömbös as the leader of the "Reform Generation" transformed the Unity Party into a mass movement. In the 1935 elections, the Party of National Unity won 170 out of the 245 seats while most of the MPs loyal to Bethlen had been purged from the party. In the 1935 election, of the Unity Party MPs elected, only 45 were loyal to Bethlen and the rest were loyal to Gömbös. However, Gömbös's attempt to replace the trade unions with the Italian Fascist style corporations that would unite both employers and employees led to vigorous opposition from the trade unions. Gömbös came to be opposed by an odd coalition that consisted of conservatives loyal to Bethlen, the Independent Smallholders, the Social Democrats, and the Christian National Party who were united only by their desire to not see Gömbös become the dictator of Hungary. Admiral Horthy by 1936 was considering dismissing Gömbös, but his death occurred before he was dismissed.

== Death ==
Gömbös never lived to see his ambitious plans come to fruition. Gömbös, after a long illness, died of testicular cancer in Munich on 6 October 1936.

== Burial ==
Gömbös was buried at Kerepesi Cemetery under exceptional circumstances; his funeral procession was attended by hundreds of thousands of Hungarians, and his catafalque was visited by many dignitaries because he was the head of the government.

== See also ==
- History of Hungary

== Boos and articles ==
- Kürti, László (2006). "Gömbös, Gyula". In Blamires, Cyprian (ed.). World fascism: a historical encyclopedia. Vol. 1. Santa Barbara, California: ABC-CLIO. pp. 285–286. ISBN 1-57607-940-6.
- Cornelius, Deborah S. (2011). Hungary in World War II Caught in the Cauldron. New York: Fordham University Press. ISBN 9780823237739.
- Klein, Bernard (Spring 1982). "Anti-Jewish Demonstrations in Hungarian Universities, 1932-1936: István Bethlen vs Gyula Gömbös". Jewish Social Studies. 44 (2): 112–124.

Political offices
Preceded by Károly Csáky	Minister of Defence; 1929–1936	Succeeded by Miklós Kozma
Preceded by Gyula Károlyi	Prime Minister of Hungary; 1932–1936	Succeeded by Kálmán Darányi
Preceded by Endre Puky	Minister of Foreign Affairs; Acting; 1933	Succeeded by Kálmán Kánya
