= Pál Pesthy =

Hungarian politician and jurist

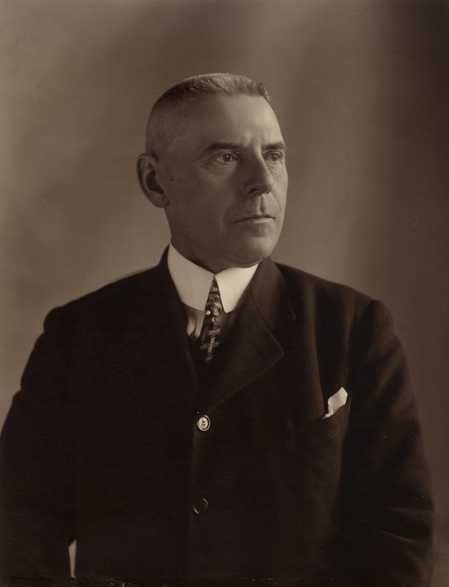

Minister of Justice of Hungary
- In office 13 March 1924 – 8 January 1929
- Preceded by: István Bethlen
- Succeeded by: István Bethlen

Personal details
- Born: July 9, 1873 Uzdborjád, Austria-Hungary
- Died: 7 May 1952 (aged 78) Sárszentlőrinc, People's Republic of Hungary
- Party: Unity Party
- Spouse: Szeréna Belák
- Children: Márta; Amália
- Profession: politician, jurist

Pál Pesthy (9 July 1873 - 7 May 1952) was a Hungarian politician and jurist, who served as Minister of Justice between 1924 and 1929. During his ministership the law being about the House of Magnates' organization (1926 XXII), some institutions of civil law, the forensic organisation's modification (1924 XV) and the last recommendation of the Civil Code were made (1928). From 1929 to 1931 he was the chairman of the Unity Party. He was a member of the House of Magnates from 1940.

Political offices
Preceded by István Bethlen	Minister of Justice; 1924–1929	Succeeded by István Bethlen
