= Tibor Kállay =

Hungarian politician

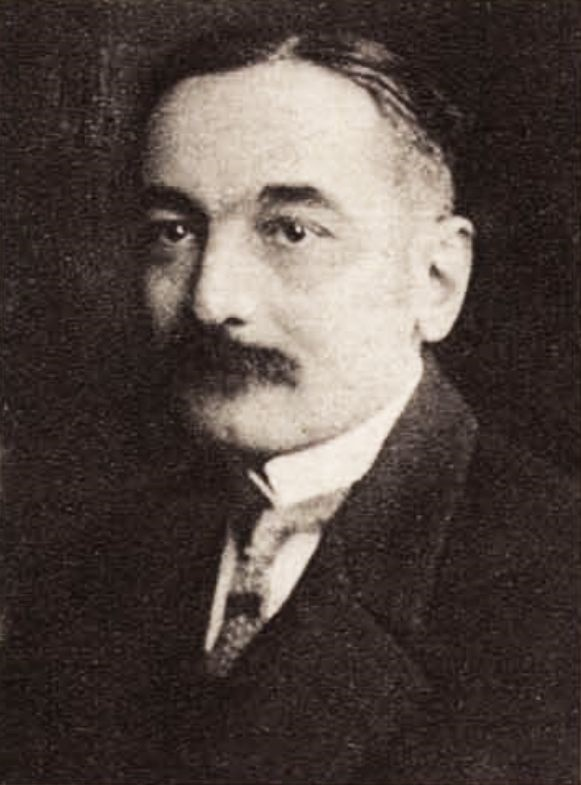
- Tibor Kállay in 1925

Minister of Finance of Hungary
- In office 3 December 1921 – 20 February 1924
- Preceded by: István Bethlen
- Succeeded by: Lajos Walko

Personal details
- Born: 6 January 1881; Budapest, Austria-Hungary
- Died: 24 May 1964 (aged 83); Budapest, People's Republic of Hungary
- Political party: KNEP, Unity Party
- Profession: politician, economist

Tibor Kállay de Nagykálló (6 January 1881 – 24 May 1964) was a Hungarian politician, who served as Minister of Finance between 1921 and 1924.

== Career ==
He studied in the University of Budapest (today: Eötvös Loránd University). In autumn 1919 he served as state secretary of the Ministry of Foreign Affairs and as chairman of the Liquidating Office, which made the financial separation and the economic rehabilitation of Austria, Hungary and the succession states (for example Romania and Czechoslovakia) after the Austro-Hungarian Monarchy's disintegration.

Kállay was appointed Minister of Finance in 1921. His major task was the keeping of state budget's balance. In 1922 he became a member of the Diet of Hungary. From May 1923 he was the leader of the League of Nations' financial negotiations. On 20 February 1924 he asked an authority of the parliament onto the uptake of a forced loan. The Parliament voted it down, and Kállay resigned. In 1926 he organized the Civil Unit Club. He campaigned for the secrecy of the franchise in the next year. He left the Unity Party in 1928, later represented his constituency as an independent MP until 1935.

Political offices
Preceded by István Bethlen	Minister of Finance; 1921–1924	Succeeded by Lajos Walko
