= Endre Puky =

Hungarian politician

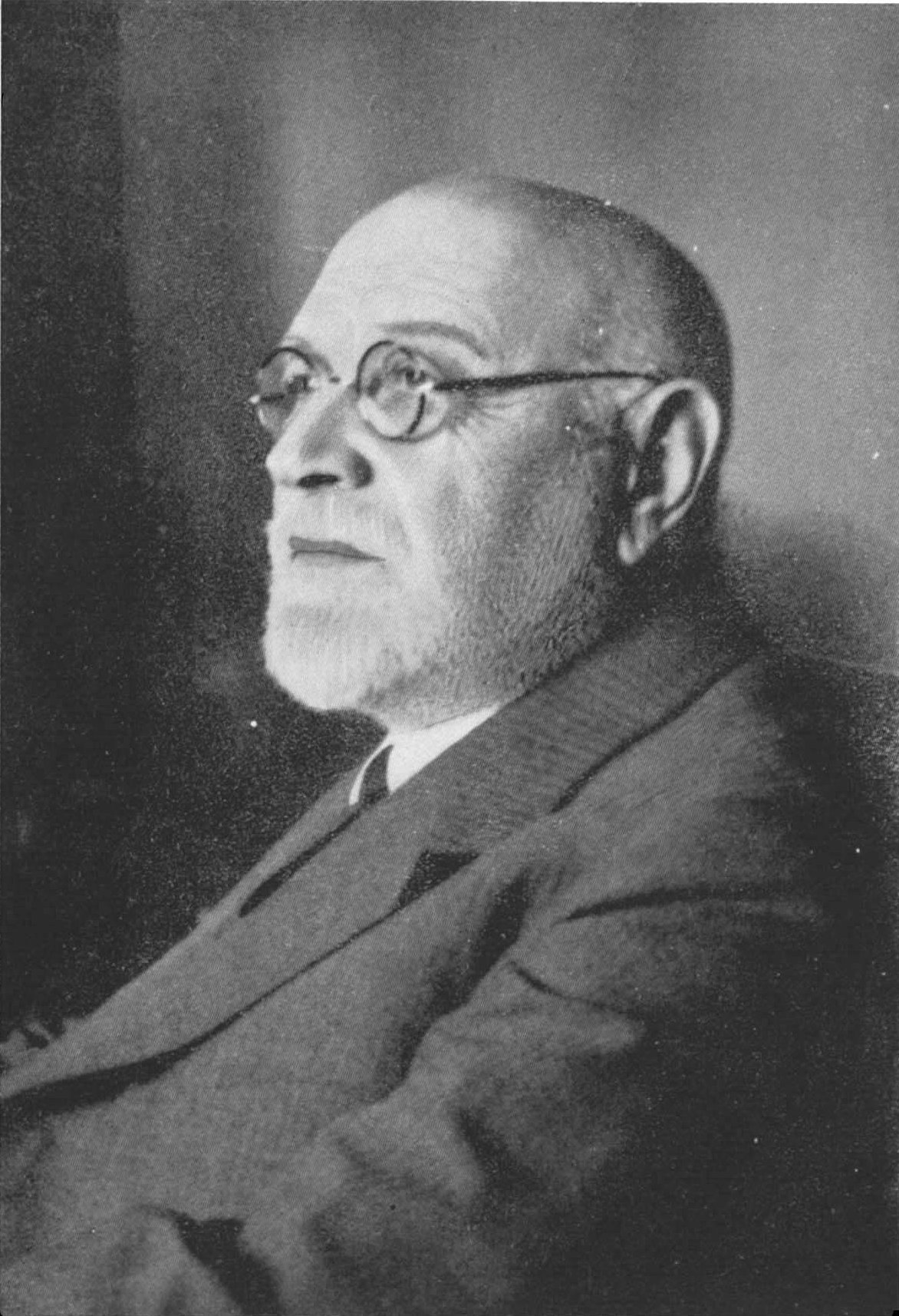

Minister of Foreign Affairs of Hungary
- In office 1 October 1932 – 9 January 1933
- Prime Minister: Gyula Gömbös
- Preceded by: Lajos Walko
- Succeeded by: Gyula Gömbös

Personal details
- Born: February 20, 1871 Kassa, Austria-Hungary
- Died: 20 July 1941 (aged 70) Szovátafürdő, Kingdom of Hungary
- Party: Party of National Unity
- Profession: politician

Endre Puky de Bizák (20 February 1871 – 20 July 1941) was a Hungarian politician, who served as Minister of Foreign Affairs between 1932 and 1933.

Political offices
Preceded by Lajos Walko	Minister of Foreign Affairs; 1932–1933	Succeeded by Gyula Gömbös
