= Géza Daruváry =

Hungarian politician (1866–1934)

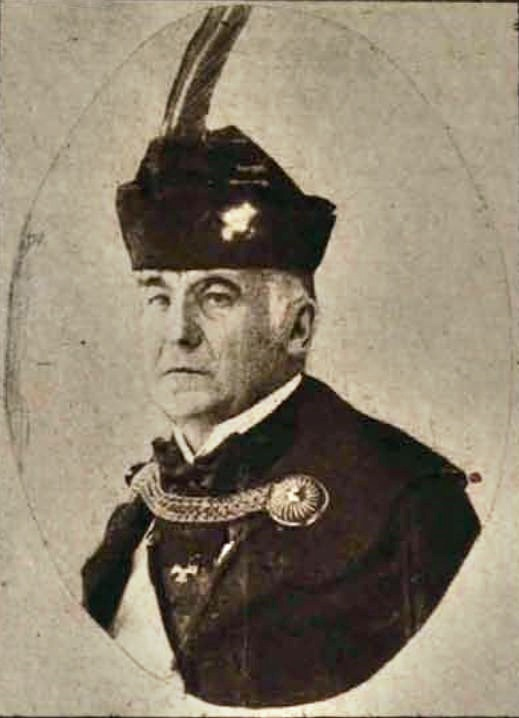

Minister of Foreign Affairs of Hungary
- In office 19 December 1922 – 7 October 1924
- Prime Minister: István Bethlen
- Preceded by: Miklós Bánffy
- Succeeded by: István Bethlen

Minister of Justice of Hungary
- In office 16 June 1922 – 11 June 1923
- Prime Minister: István Bethlen
- Preceded by: Vilmos Pál Tomcsányi
- Succeeded by: Emil Nagy

Personal details
- Born: 12 January 1866 Pest, Kingdom of Hungary, Austrian Empire
- Died: 3 August 1934 (aged 68) Budapest, Kingdom of Hungary
- Party: Independent
- Profession: politician

Géza Daruváry de Daruvár (12 January 1866 – 3 August 1934) was a Hungarian politician, who served as Minister of Justice from 1922 to 1923 and Minister of Foreign Affairs between 1922 and 1924. Before the First World War he worked as a consul in several states. István Bethlen appointed him Minister of Justice in 1922. As foreign minister, he wanted to make a connection with the Soviet Union (trade and diplomacy), but Daruváry didn't reach any results.

Political offices
Preceded by Vilmos Pál Tomcsányi	Minister of Justice; 1922–1923	Succeeded by Emil Nagy
Preceded by Miklós Bánffy	Minister of Foreign Affairs; 1922–1924	Succeeded by István Bethlen
