= Tibor Scitovszky =

Hungarian politician

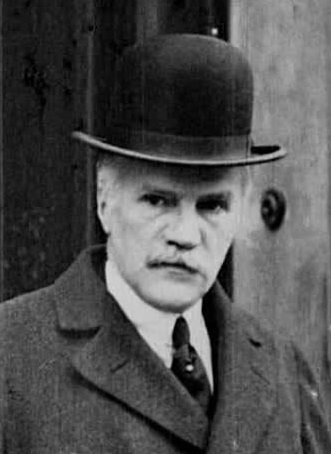

Minister of Foreign Affairs of Hungary
- In office 15 November 1924 – 17 March 1925
- Prime Minister: István Bethlen
- Preceded by: István Bethlen
- Succeeded by: Lajos Walko

Personal details
- Born: 21 June 1875 Nőtincs, Austria-Hungary
- Died: 12 April 1959 (aged 83) Los Angeles, United States
- Party: Unity Party
- Children: Tibor Scitovsky
- Profession: politician

Tibor Scitovszky de Nagykér (21 June 1875 – 12 April 1959) was a Hungarian politician who served as Minister of Foreign Affairs between 1924 and 1925. He started his career in the Ministry of Trade after attending the university in Budapest and Paris. During the Treaty of Trianon he participated in the peace negotiations. He was the chairman of the Hungarian General Credit Bank from 1944. When the communist regime nationalized the banks Scitovszky left the country and emigrated to the United States.

Political offices
Preceded by István Bethlen	Minister of Foreign Affairs; 1924–1925	Succeeded by Lajos Walko
