= Minister of Foreign Affairs (Hungary) =

Minister of Foreign Affairs of Hungary
- Magyarország külügyminisztere
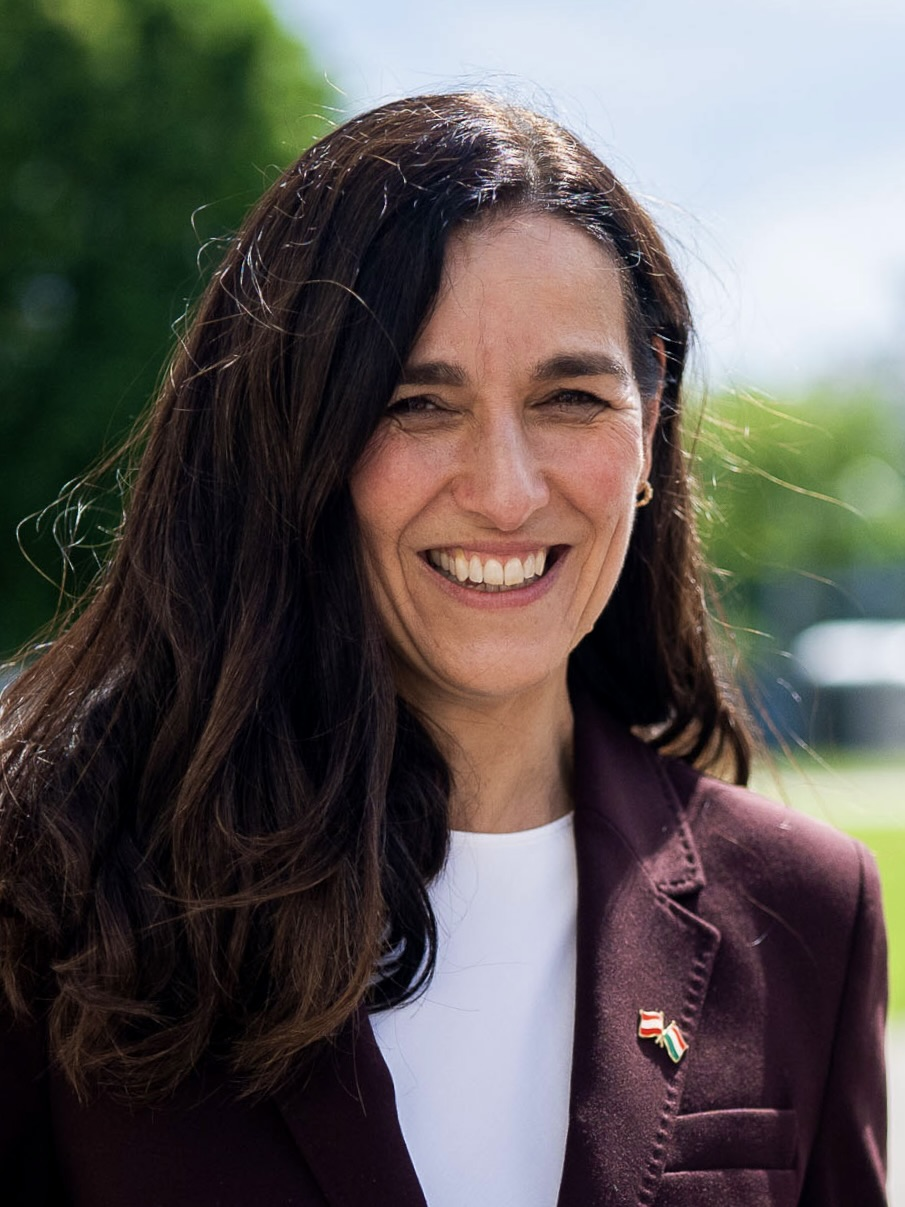
- Incumbent; Anita Orbán since 13 May 2026
- Ministry of Foreign Affairs
- Type: Minister
- Member of: Government of Hungary
- Formation: 7 April 1848
- First holder: Pál Esterházy

The minister of foreign affairs of Hungary (Hungarian: Magyarország külügyminisztere) is a member of the Government of Hungary and the head of the Ministry of Foreign Affairs. The current foreign minister is Anita Orbán.

The position was called People's Commissar of Foreign Affairs (Hungarian: külügyi népbiztos) during the Hungarian Soviet Republic in 1919 and Minister besides the King (Hungarian: a király személye körüli miniszter) between 1848 and 1918, except in 1849 when Hungary declared its independence from the Austrian Empire. During the existence of Austria-Hungary (1867–1918) the two countries also had a joint Minister of Foreign Affairs.

== Ministers besides the King (1848) ==
=== Hungarian Kingdom (1848) ===
Parties Conservative Party

No.	Portrait	Name (Birth–Death)	Term of office		Political party	Cabinet	Assembly (Election)
1		Pál Esterházy (1786–1866)	7 April 1848	9 September 1848	Conservative Party	Batthyány	Last Diet
1		Pál Esterházy (1786–1866)	7 April 1848	9 September 1848	Conservative Party	Batthyány	1 (1848)

== Ministers of Foreign Affairs (1849) ==
=== Hungarian State (1849) ===
Parties Opposition Party

No.	Portrait	Name (Birth–Death)	Term of office		Political party	Cabinet	Assembly (Election)
1		Kázmér Batthyány (1807–1854)	8 May 1849	16 July 1849	Opposition Party	Szemere	1 (1848)

After the collapse of the Hungarian Revolution of 1848, the Hungarian Kingdom became an integral part of the Austrian Empire until 1867, when dual Austro-Hungarian Monarchy was created.

== Ministers besides the King (1867–1918) ==
=== Hungarian Kingdom (1867–1918) ===
Parties Deák Party/Liberal Party/National Party of Work Catholic People's Party F48P/F48P–Károlyi Independent

No.	Portrait	Name (Birth–Death)	Term of office		Political party	Cabinet	Assembly (Election)
1		György Festetics (1815–1883)	20 February 1867	19 May 1871	Independent	Andrássy; DP	3 (1865)
1		György Festetics (1815–1883)	20 February 1867	19 May 1871	Independent	Andrássy; DP	4 (1869)
2		Béla Wenckheim (1811–1879)	19 May 1871	14 November 1871	Deák Party	Andrássy; DP	4 (1869)
2		Béla Wenckheim (1811–1879)	14 November 1871	4 December 1872	Deák Party	Lónyay; DP	4 (1869)
2		Béla Wenckheim (1811–1879)	14 November 1871	4 December 1872	Deák Party	Lónyay; DP	5 (1872)
2		Béla Wenckheim (1811–1879)	4 December 1872	21 March 1874	Deák Party	Szlávy; DP	5 (1872)
2		Béla Wenckheim (1811–1879)	21 March 1874	2 March 1875	Deák Party	Bittó; DP–BK	5 (1872)
2		Béla Wenckheim (1811–1879)	2 March 1875	20 October 1875	Liberal Party	Wenckheim; SZP	5 (1872)
2		Béla Wenckheim (1811–1879)	20 October 1875	7 July 1879	Liberal Party	K. Tisza; SZP	6 (1875)
2		Béla Wenckheim (1811–1879)	20 October 1875	7 July 1879	Liberal Party	K. Tisza; SZP	7 (1878)
—		Kálmán Tisza (1830–1902) acting	11 July 1879	25 September 1879	Liberal Party	K. Tisza; SZP	7 (1878)
3		Béla Orczy (1822–1917)	25 September 1879	13 March 1890	Liberal Party	K. Tisza; SZP	7 (1878)
3		Béla Orczy (1822–1917)	25 September 1879	13 March 1890	Liberal Party	K. Tisza; SZP	8 (1881)
3		Béla Orczy (1822–1917)	25 September 1879	13 March 1890	Liberal Party	K. Tisza; SZP	9 (1884)
3		Béla Orczy (1822–1917)	25 September 1879	13 March 1890	Liberal Party	K. Tisza; SZP	10 (1887)
3		Béla Orczy (1822–1917)	13 March 1890	24 December 1890	Liberal Party	Szapáry; SZP	10 (1887)
4		László Szőgyény-Marich (1841–1916)	24 December 1890	24 October 1892	Liberal Party	Szapáry; SZP	10 (1887)
4		László Szőgyény-Marich (1841–1916)	24 December 1890	24 October 1892	Liberal Party	Szapáry; SZP	11 (1892)
—		Géza Fejérváry (1833–1914) acting	24 October 1892	19 November 1892	Independent	Szapáry; SZP	11 (1892)
5		Lajos Tisza (1832–1898)	19 November 1892	10 June 1894	Liberal Party	Wekerle I SZP	11 (1892)
6		Gyula Andrássy, Jr. (1860–1929)	10 June 1894	15 January 1895	Liberal Party	Wekerle I SZP	11 (1892)
—		Géza Fejérváry (1833–1914) acting	15 January 1895	18 January 1895	Independent	Bánffy; SZP	11 (1892)
7		Sámuel Jósika (1848–1923)	18 January 1895	20 January 1898	Liberal Party	Bánffy; SZP	11 (1892)
7		Sámuel Jósika (1848–1923)	18 January 1895	20 January 1898	Liberal Party	Bánffy; SZP	12 (1896)
—		Dezső Bánffy (1843–1911) acting	20 January 1898	20 December 1898	Liberal Party	Bánffy; SZP	12 (1896)
8		Manó Széchényi (1858–1926)	20 December 1898	26 February 1899	Independent	Bánffy; SZP	12 (1896)
8		Manó Széchényi (1858–1926)	26 February 1899	7 March 1900	Independent	Széll; SZP	12 (1896)
—		Kálmán Széll (1843–1915) acting	7 March 1900	29 March 1900	Liberal Party	Széll; SZP	12 (1896)
9		Gyula Széchényi (1829–1921)	29 March 1900	27 June 1903	Independent	Széll; SZP	12 (1896)
9		Gyula Széchényi (1829–1921)	29 March 1900	27 June 1903	Independent	Széll; SZP	13 (1901)
10		Károly Khuen-Héderváry (1849–1918); 1st term	27 June 1903	3 November 1903	Liberal Party	Khuen-Héderváry I SZP	13 (1901)
11		István Tisza (1861–1918)	3 November 1903	3 March 1904	Liberal Party	I. Tisza I SZP	13 (1901)
(10)		Károly Khuen-Héderváry (1849–1918); 2nd term	3 March 1904	18 June 1905	Liberal Party	I. Tisza I SZP	13 (1901)
12		Géza Fejérváry (1833–1914)	18 June 1905	8 April 1906	Independent	Fejérváry; SZP	14 (1905)
13		Aladár Zichy (1864–1937); 1st term	8 April 1906	17 January 1910	Catholic People's Party	Wekerle II; F48P–OAP–KNP–PDP	15 (1906)
(10)		Károly Khuen-Héderváry (1849–1918); 3rd term	17 January 1910	22 April 1912	National Party of Work	Khuen-Héderváry II; NMP	16 (1910)
14		László Lukács (1850–1932)	22 April 1912	10 June 1913	National Party of Work	Lukács; NMP	16 (1910)
15		István Burián (1851–1922)	10 June 1913	13 January 1915	Independent	I. Tisza II; NMP	16 (1910)
—		István Tisza (1861–1918) acting	13 January 1915	29 May 1915	National Party of Work	I. Tisza II; NMP	16 (1910)
16		Ervin Roszner (1852–1928)	29 May 1915	15 June 1917	National Party of Work	I. Tisza II; NMP	16 (1910)
17		Tivadar Batthyány (1859–1931); 1st term	15 June 1917	18 August 1917	F48P	Esterházy; NMP–F48P–OAP–PDP–KNP	16 (1910)
(13)		Aladár Zichy (1864–1937); 2nd term	18 August 1917	23 August 1917	Catholic People's Party	Esterházy; NMP–F48P–OAP–PDP–KNP	16 (1910)
(13)		Aladár Zichy (1864–1937); 2nd term	23 August 1917	31 October 1918	Catholic People's Party	Wekerle III; NMP–F48P–OAP–PDP–KNP	16 (1910)
—		István Rakovszky (1858–1931)	30 October 1918	31 October 1918	Catholic People's Party	Hadik not formed	16 (1910)
(17)		Tivadar Batthyány (1859–1931); 2nd term	31 October 1918	1 November 1918	F48P–Károlyi	M. Károlyi; F48P–Károlyi–PRP–MSZDP	MNT (—)
18		Mihály Károlyi (1875–1955)	1 November 1918	16 November 1918	F48P–Károlyi	M. Károlyi; F48P–Károlyi–PRP–MSZDP	MNT (—)

== Ministers of Foreign Affairs (1918–1919) ==
=== Hungarian People's Republic (1918–1919) ===
Parties F48P–Károlyi Civic Radical Party (PRP)

No.	Portrait	Name (Birth–Death)	Term of office		Political party	Cabinet	Assembly (Election)
1		Mihály Károlyi (1875–1955)	16 November 1918	11 January 1919	F48P–Károlyi	M. Károlyi; F48P–Károlyi–PRP–MSZDP	MNT (—)
—		Dénes Berinkey (1871–1944) acting	11 January 1919	24 January 1919	PRP	Berinkey; F48P–Károlyi–PRP–MSZDP–OKGFP	MNT (—)
2		Ferenc Harrer (1874–1969)	24 January 1919	21 March 1919	PRP	Berinkey; F48P–Károlyi–PRP–MSZDP–OKGFP	MNT (—)

== People's Commissars of Foreign Affairs (1919) ==
=== Hungarian Soviet Republic (1919) ===
Parties MSZP/SZKMMP

No.	Portrait	Name (Birth–Death)	Term of office		Political party	Cabinet	Assembly (Election)
1		Béla Kun (1886–1939) serving with József Pogány and Péter Ágoston from 3 April to 24 June 1919	21 March 1919	1 August 1919	MSZP	Central Executive Council; MSZP/SZKMMP	TOGY (—)
(1)		József Pogány (1886–1938) serving with Béla Kun and Péter Ágoston	3 April 1919	24 June 1919	MSZP/SZKMMP	Central Executive Council; MSZP/SZKMMP	TOGY (—)
(1)		Péter Ágoston (1874–1925) serving with Béla Kun and József Pogány	3 April 1919	24 June 1919	MSZP/SZKMMP	Central Executive Council; MSZP/SZKMMP	TOGY (—)

==== Counter-revolutionary governments (1919) ====
Parties Independent

No.	Portrait	Name (Birth–Death)	Term of office		Political party	Cabinet	Assembly (Election)
—		Gyula Bornemisza (1873–1925)	5 May 1919	31 May 1919	Independent	Arad	—
—		Pál Teleki (1879–1941)	31 May 1919	6 June 1919	Independent	Szeged I	—
—		Pál Teleki (1879–1941)	6 June 1919	12 July 1919	Independent	Szeged II	—
—		Pál Teleki (1879–1941)	12 July 1919	12 August 1919	Independent	Szeged III	—

== Ministers of Foreign Affairs (1919–present) ==
=== Hungarian People's Republic (1919) ===
Parties MSZDP

No.	Portrait	Name (Birth–Death)	Term of office		Political party	Cabinet	Assembly (Election)
1		Péter Ágoston (1874–1925)	1 August 1919	6 August 1919 (deposed)	MSZDP	Peidl; MSZDP	—

=== Hungarian Republic (1919–1920) ===
Parties Independent

No.	Portrait	Name (Birth–Death)	Term of office		Political party	Cabinet	Assembly (Election)
—		Gábor Tánczos (1872–1953) acting	7 August 1919	15 August 1919	Independent	Friedrich; KNP/KNEP–OKGFP	—
1		Márton Lovászy (1864–1927)	15 August 1919	11 September 1919	Independent	Friedrich; KNP/KNEP–OKGFP	—
2		József Somssich (1864–1941)	11 September 1919	24 November 1919	Independent	Friedrich; KNP/KNEP–OKGFP	—
2		József Somssich (1864–1941)	24 November 1919	29 February 1920	Independent	Huszár; KNEP–OKGFP–MSZDP–NDPP	—

=== Hungarian Kingdom (1920–1946) ===
Parties KNEP EP–NEP–MÉP Independent

No.	Portrait	Name (Birth–Death)	Term of office		Political party	Cabinet	Assembly (Election)
1		József Somssich (1864–1941)	29 February 1920	15 March 1920	Independent	Huszár; KNEP–OKGFP–MSZDP–NDPP	—
—		Sándor Simonyi-Semadam (1864–1946) acting	15 March 1920	19 April 1920	KNEP	Simonyi-Semadam; KNEP–OKGFP	17 (1920)
2		Pál Teleki (1879–1941)	19 April 1920	19 July 1920	KNEP	Simonyi-Semadam; KNEP–OKGFP	17 (1920)
—		Pál Teleki (1879–1941) acting	19 July 1920	22 September 1920	KNEP	Teleki I KNEP–OKGFP	17 (1920)
3		Imre Csáky (1882–1961)	22 September 1920	16 December 1920	Independent	Teleki I KNEP–OKGFP	17 (1920)
—		Pál Teleki (1879–1941) acting	16 December 1920	17 January 1921	KNEP	Teleki I KNEP–OKGFP	17 (1920)
4		Gusztáv Gratz (1875–1946)	17 January 1921	12 April 1921	Independent	Teleki I KNEP–OKGFP	17 (1920)
—		Pál Teleki (1879–1941) acting	12 April 1921	14 April 1921	KNEP	Teleki I KNEP–OKGFP	17 (1920)
5		Miklós Bánffy (1873–1950)	14 April 1921	19 December 1922	Independent	Bethlen (KNEP–OKGFP)→EP	17 (1920)
5		Miklós Bánffy (1873–1950)	14 April 1921	19 December 1922	Independent	Bethlen (KNEP–OKGFP)→EP	18 (1922)
—		Géza Daruváry (1866–1934) acting	19 December 1922	11 June 1923	Independent	Bethlen (KNEP–OKGFP)→EP	18 (1922)
6		Géza Daruváry (1866–1934)	11 June 1923	7 October 1924	Independent	Bethlen (KNEP–OKGFP)→EP	18 (1922)
—		István Bethlen (1874–1946) acting	7 October 1924	15 November 1924	EP	Bethlen (KNEP–OKGFP)→EP	18 (1922)
7		Tibor Scitovszky (1875–1959)	15 November 1924	17 March 1925	EP	Bethlen (KNEP–OKGFP)→EP	18 (1922)
—		Lajos Walko (1880–1954) acting for Tibor Scitovszky	5 March 1925	17 March 1925	EP	Bethlen (KNEP–OKGFP)→EP	18 (1922)
—		Lajos Walko (1880–1954) acting	17 March 1925	15 October 1926	EP	Bethlen (KNEP–OKGFP)→EP	18 (1922)
8		Lajos Walko (1880–1954); 1st term	15 October 1926	9 December 1930	EP	Bethlen (KNEP–OKGFP)→EP	18 (1922)
8		Lajos Walko (1880–1954); 1st term	15 October 1926	9 December 1930	EP	Bethlen (KNEP–OKGFP)→EP	19 (1926)
9		Gyula Károlyi (1871–1947)	9 December 1930	24 August 1931	EP	Bethlen (KNEP–OKGFP)→EP	19 (1926)
9		Gyula Károlyi (1871–1947)	9 December 1930	24 August 1931	EP	Bethlen (KNEP–OKGFP)→EP	20 (1931)
(8)		Lajos Walko (1880–1954); 2nd term	24 August 1931	1 October 1932	EP	G. Károlyi; EP–KGSZP	20 (1931)
10		Endre Puky (1871–1941)	1 October 1932	9 January 1933	NEP	Gömbös; NEP	20 (1931)
—		Gyula Gömbös (1886–1936) acting	9 January 1933	4 February 1933	NEP	Gömbös; NEP	20 (1931)
11		Kálmán Kánya (1869–1945)	4 February 1933	12 October 1936	NEP	Gömbös; NEP	20 (1931)
11		Kálmán Kánya (1869–1945)	4 February 1933	12 October 1936	NEP	Gömbös; NEP	21 (1935)
11		Kálmán Kánya (1869–1945)	12 October 1936	14 May 1938	Independent	Darányi; NEP	21 (1935)
11		Kálmán Kánya (1869–1945)	14 May 1938	28 November 1938	Independent	Imrédy; NEP	21 (1935)
—		Béla Imrédy (1891–1946) acting	28 November 1938	10 December 1938	NEP	Imrédy; NEP	21 (1935)
12		István Csáky (1894–1941)	10 December 1938	16 February 1939	NEP	Imrédy; NEP	21 (1935)
12		István Csáky (1894–1941)	16 February 1939	27 January 1941 (died in office)	MÉP	Teleki II; MÉP	21 (1935)
12		István Csáky (1894–1941)	16 February 1939	27 January 1941 (died in office)	MÉP	Teleki II; MÉP	22 (1939)
—		Pál Teleki (1879–1941) acting for István Csáky	21 December 1940	27 January 1941	MÉP	Teleki II; MÉP	22 (1939)
—		Pál Teleki (1879–1941) acting	27 January 1941	4 February 1941	MÉP	Teleki II; MÉP	22 (1939)
13		László Bárdossy (1890–1946)	4 February 1941	3 April 1941	MÉP	Teleki II; MÉP	22 (1939)
13		László Bárdossy (1890–1946)	3 April 1941	7 March 1942	MÉP	Bárdossy; MÉP	22 (1939)
—		Ferenc Keresztes-Fischer (1881–1948) acting	7 March 1942	9 March 1942	MÉP	Bárdossy; MÉP	22 (1939)
—		Miklós Kállay (1887–1967) acting	9 March 1942	20 May 1942	MÉP	Kállay; MÉP	22 (1939)
14		Miklós Kállay (1887–1967)	20 May 1942	24 July 1943	MÉP	Kállay; MÉP	22 (1939)
15		Jenő Ghyczy (1893–1982)	24 July 1943	22 March 1944 (deposed)	Independent	Kállay; MÉP	22 (1939)
16		Döme Sztójay (1883–1946)	22 March 1944	29 August 1944	Independent	Sztójay; MÉP–MMP	22 (1939)
17		Gusztáv Hennyey (1888–1977)	29 August 1944	16 October 1944 (deposed)	Independent	Lakatos; MÉP	22 (1939)

==== Government of National Unity (1944–1945) ====
Parties Arrow Cross Party

No.	Portrait	Name (Birth–Death)	Term of office		Political party	Cabinet	Assembly (Election)
1		Gábor Kemény (1910–1946)	16 October 1944	28 March 1945	NYKP	Szálasi; NYKP–MMP	—

==== Soviet-backed provisional governments (1944–1946) ====
Parties FKGP

No.	Portrait	Name (Birth–Death)	Term of office		Political party	Cabinet	Assembly (Election)
1		János Gyöngyösi (1893–1951)	22 December 1944	15 November 1945	FKGP	Provisional National Government; FKGP–MKP–MSZDP–NPP–PDP	INGY (1944)
1		János Gyöngyösi (1893–1951)	15 November 1945	1 February 1946	FKGP	Tildy; FKGP–MKP–MSZDP–NPP	23 (1945)

=== Hungarian Republic (1946–1949) ===
Parties FKGP MKP-MDP

No.	Portrait	Name (Birth–Death)	Term of office		Political party	Cabinet	Assembly (Election)
1		János Gyöngyösi (1893–1951)	1 February 1946	31 May 1947	FKGP	F. Nagy; FKGP–MKP–MSZDP–NPP	23 (1945)
—		Ernő Mihályfi (1898–1972) acting	31 May 1947	24 September 1947	FKGP	Dinnyés; MKP–FKGP–MSZDP–NPP	23 (1945)
2		Erik Molnár (1894–1966); 1st term	24 September 1947	5 August 1948	MKP	Dinnyés; MKP–FKGP–MSZDP–NPP	24 (1947)
3		László Rajk (1909–1949)	5 August 1948	10 December 1948	MDP	Dinnyés; MKP–FKGP–MSZDP–NPP	24 (1947)
3		László Rajk (1909–1949)	10 December 1948	11 June 1949	MDP	Dobi; MDP–FKGP–NPP	24 (1947)
4		Gyula Kállai (1910–1996)	11 June 1949	20 August 1949	MDP	Dobi; MDP–FKGP–NPP	25 (1949)

=== Hungarian People's Republic (1949–1989) ===
Parties MDP-MSZMP MSZP

No.	Portrait	Name (Birth–Death)	Term of office		Political party	Cabinet	Assembly (Election)
1		Gyula Kállai (1910–1996)	20 August 1949	12 May 1951	MDP	Dobi; MDP	25 (1949)
2		Károly Kiss (1903–1983)	12 May 1951	14 August 1952	MDP	Dobi; MDP	25 (1949)
2		Károly Kiss (1903–1983)	14 August 1952	14 November 1952	MDP	Rákosi; MDP	25 (1949)
3		Erik Molnár (1894–1966); 2nd term	14 November 1952	4 July 1953	MDP	Rákosi; MDP	25 (1949)
4		János Boldóczki (1912–1988)	4 July 1953	18 April 1955	MDP	I. Nagy I MDP	26 (1953)
4		János Boldóczki (1912–1988)	18 April 1955	30 July 1956	MDP	Hegedüs; MDP	26 (1953)
5		Imre Horváth (1901–1958); 1st term	30 July 1956	24 October 1956	MDP	Hegedüs; MDP	26 (1953)
5		Imre Horváth (1901–1958); 1st term	24 October 1956	2 November 1956	MDP	I. Nagy II; MDP/MSZMP–FKGP	26 (1953)
6		Imre Nagy (1896–1958)	2 November 1956	4 November 1956	MSZMP	I. Nagy III; MSZMP–FKGP–MSZDP–PP	26 (1953)
7		Imre Horváth (1901–1958); 2nd term	4 November 1956	28 January 1958	MSZMP	Kádár I MSZMP	26 (1953)
7		Imre Horváth (1901–1958); 2nd term	28 January 1958	2 February 1958 (died in office)	MSZMP	Münnich; MSZMP	26 (1953)
8		Endre Sík (1891–1978)	2 February 1958	13 September 1961	MSZMP	Münnich; MSZMP	26 (1953)
8		Endre Sík (1891–1978)	2 February 1958	13 September 1961	MSZMP	Münnich; MSZMP	27 (1958)
9		János Péter (1910–1999)	13 September 1961	30 June 1965	MSZMP	Kádár II; MSZMP	27 (1958)
9		János Péter (1910–1999)	13 September 1961	30 June 1965	MSZMP	Kádár II; MSZMP	28 (1963)
9		János Péter (1910–1999)	30 June 1965	14 April 1967	MSZMP	Kállai; MSZMP	28 (1963)
9		János Péter (1910–1999)	14 April 1967	14 December 1973	MSZMP	Fock; MSZMP	29 (1967)
9		János Péter (1910–1999)	14 April 1967	14 December 1973	MSZMP	Fock; MSZMP	30 (1971)
10		Frigyes Puja (1921–2008)	14 December 1973	15 May 1975	MSZMP	Fock; MSZMP	30 (1971)
10		Frigyes Puja (1921–2008)	15 May 1975	8 July 1983	MSZMP	Lázár; MSZMP	30 (1971)
10		Frigyes Puja (1921–2008)	15 May 1975	8 July 1983	MSZMP	Lázár; MSZMP	31 (1975)
10		Frigyes Puja (1921–2008)	15 May 1975	8 July 1983	MSZMP	Lázár; MSZMP	32 (1980)
11		Péter Várkonyi (1931–2008)	8 July 1983	25 June 1987	MSZMP	Lázár; MSZMP	32 (1980)
11		Péter Várkonyi (1931–2008)	8 July 1983	25 June 1987	MSZMP	Lázár; MSZMP	33 (1985)
11		Péter Várkonyi (1931–2008)	25 June 1987	24 November 1988	MSZMP	Grósz; MSZMP	33 (1985)
11		Péter Várkonyi (1931–2008)	24 November 1988	10 May 1989	MSZMP	Németh (MSZMP)→MSZP	33 (1985)
12		Gyula Horn (1932–2013)	10 May 1989	7 October 1989	MSZMP	Németh (MSZMP)→MSZP	33 (1985)
(12)		Gyula Horn (1932–2013)	7 October 1989	23 October 1989	MSZP	Németh (MSZMP)→MSZP	33 (1985)

=== Hungarian Republic / Hungary (1989–present) ===
Parties MSZP Fidesz MDF TISZA Independent

No.	Portrait	Name (Birth–Death)	Term of office		Political party	Cabinet	Assembly (Election)
—		Gyula Horn (1932–2013) provisional	23 October 1989	23 May 1990	MSZP	Németh; MSZP	—
1		Géza Jeszenszky (born 1941)	23 May 1990	21 December 1993	MDF	Antall; MDF–FKGP–KDNP	34 (1990)
1		Géza Jeszenszky (born 1941)	21 December 1993	15 July 1994	MDF	Boross; MDF–EKGP–KDNP	34 (1990)
2		László Kovács (born 1939); 1st term	15 July 1994	8 July 1998	MSZP	Horn; MSZP–SZDSZ	35 (1994)
3		János Martonyi (born 1944); 1st term	8 July 1998	27 May 2002	Independent	Orbán I Fidesz–FKGP–MDF	36 (1998)
(2)		László Kovács (born 1939); 2nd term	27 May 2002	29 September 2004	MSZP	Medgyessy; MSZP–SZDSZ	37 (2002)
(2)		László Kovács (born 1939); 2nd term	29 September 2004	1 November 2004	MSZP	Gyurcsány I MSZP–SZDSZ	37 (2002)
4		Ferenc Somogyi (1945–2021)	1 November 2004	9 June 2006	Independent	Gyurcsány I MSZP–SZDSZ	37 (2002)
5		Kinga Göncz (born 1947)	9 June 2006	14 April 2009	Independent	Gyurcsány II; MSZP–SZDSZ	38 (2006)
6		Péter Balázs (born 1941)	14 April 2009	29 May 2010	Independent	Bajnai; MSZP	38 (2006)
(3)		János Martonyi (born 1944); 2nd term	29 May 2010	6 June 2014	Fidesz	Orbán II; Fidesz–KDNP	39 (2010)
7		Tibor Navracsics (born 1966)	6 June 2014	23 September 2014	Fidesz	Orbán III; Fidesz–KDNP	40 (2014)
8		Péter Szijjártó (born 1978)	23 September 2014	18 May 2018	Fidesz	Orbán III; Fidesz–KDNP	40 (2014)
8		Péter Szijjártó (born 1978)	18 May 2018	24 May 2022	Fidesz	Orbán IV; Fidesz–KDNP	41 (2018)
8		Péter Szijjártó (born 1978)	24 May 2022	12 May 2026	Fidesz	Orbán V Fidesz–KDNP	42 (2022)
9		Anita Orbán (born 1974)	13 May 2026	Incumbent	TISZA	Magyar; TISZA	43 (2026)

== See also ==
- List of heads of state of Hungary
- List of prime ministers of Hungary
- Politics of Hungary

Cabinet ministers

- Minister of Agriculture (Hungary)
- Minister of Civilian Intelligence Services (Hungary)
- Minister of Croatian Affairs of Hungary
- Minister of Defence (Hungary)
- Minister of Education (Hungary)
- Minister of Finance (Hungary)
- Minister of the Interior (Hungary)
- Minister of Justice (Hungary)
- Minister of Public Works and Transport (Hungary)
