= Emil Nagy =

Hungarian politician and jurist

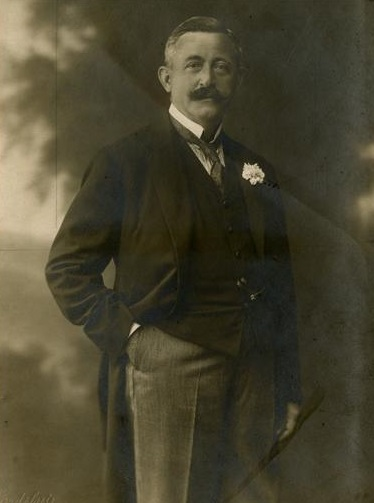

Minister of Justice of Hungary
- In office 11 June 1923 – 21 February 1924
- Preceded by: Géza Daruváry
- Succeeded by: István Bethlen

Personal details
- Born: November 16, 1871 Kaposvár, Austria-Hungary
- Died: 20 August 1956 (aged 84) Budapest, People's Republic of Hungary
- Party: Unity Party, United Party of Independence and of 1848 (Kossuth Party)
- Spouse(s): Adél Kenessey; Ilona Emődy; Mária Göllner
- Children: Adél; Erzsébet; Éva; Ádám; Margit; Emil; Kató; István; Sándor; Kristóf
- Profession: politician, jurist

Emil Nagy de Vámos (16 November 1871 – 20 August 1956) was a Hungarian politician and jurist, who served as Minister of Justice between 1923 and 1924.

== Biography ==
He studied law in Budapest, after that he went to the German Empire to a field trip. He was a trainee in Paris, France in 1895. He worked as a lawyer in the Hungarian capital city between 1898 and 1946 with short interruptions. He was a member of the International Law Association since 1926.

He served as representative of the Diet of Hungary between 1905 and 1935 at many times. He was a member of the Inter-Parliamentary Union from 1926. He also served as Vice President of the Christian Social Alliance and of the Association of the Hungarian Foreign Affairs. István Bethlen appointed him justice minister on 11 June 1923. He resigned and left the governing party in 1924. Nagy was one of the main propagators of the Hungarian Revisionism. He was the chairman of the Hungarian-Finnish Society, a society for creating cultural links between Finland and Hungary.

After the Second World War he retired from the politics and public life. During the communist regime he was interned in 1951. He was set free in 1953. Emil Nagy died on 20 August 1956.

== Family ==
Emil Nagy had three wives.

- Adél Kenessey (children: Adél, Erzsébet, Éva, Ádám, Margit)
- Ilona Emődy (children: Emil, Kató)
- Mária Göllner, a famous Hungarian anthroposophist, cultural historian (children: István, Sándor, Kristóf)

== Works ==
=== Journalism ===
He published articles for the Budapesti Hírlap and the Pesti Hírlap between 1904 and 1944.

=== Books ===
- Emile de Nagy–Maximilien Fenyő (Emil Nagy–Miksa Fenyő): Le Traté de Trianon et ses Conséquences (Budapest, 1927, Athenaeum)
- Az út az orvoslás felé In: Igazságot Magyarországnak! (Budapest, 1928, Magyar Külügyi Társaság; Szekszárd, 2003, Babits Kiadó)
- Jogos-e az a követelésem, hogy Bethlen István gróf nekem teljes elégtételt adjon az írói becsületem ellen elkövetett súlyos sértésért? (Budapest, é.n. [1928])
- A Duna–Tisza-csatorna világszemszögből (In: Bizalom 1931/11.sz.; Országépítő 2001/2.sz.)
- Nagy Emil londoni levelei (Budapest, 1936, Singer és Wolfner)
- A magyar–finn kultúregyezmény megkötésének ünnepére (In: Északi Rokonaink, 1. 1939, június 7–8.p.)
- Finn–magyar párhuzamok (In: Északi Rokonaink, 2. 1940, március 65–67. p.)
- Memoirs (1946, kézirat; Budapest, 2011).

Political offices
Preceded by Géza Daruváry	Minister of Justice; 1923–1924	Succeeded by István Bethlen
