= István Bethlen =

Hungarian politician (1874–1946)

Count István Bethlen de Bethlen
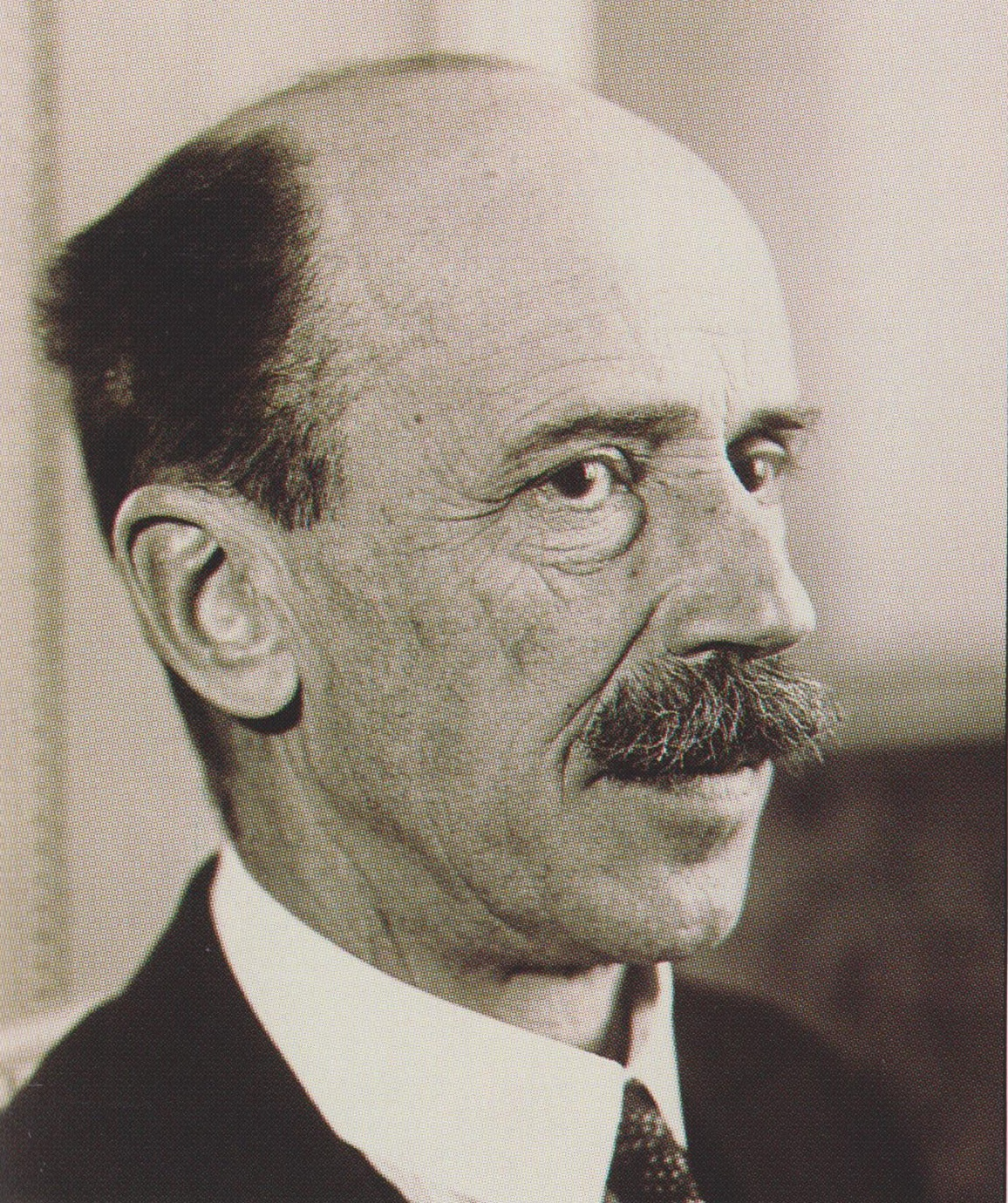

28th Prime Minister of the Kingdom of Hungary
- In office 14 April 1921 – 24 August 1931
- Deputy: Kuno Klebelsberg; Iván Rakovszky; Béla Scitovszky
- Regent: Miklós Horthy
- Preceded by: Pál Teleki
- Succeeded by: Gyula Károlyi

Leader of the Unity Party
- In office 2 February 1922 – 27 Osctober 1932
- Preceded by: Office established
- Succeeded by: Gyula Gömbös

Member of the House of Representatives
- In office 31 October 1901 – 16 November 1918
- In office 18 February 1920 – 2 February 1939

Personal details
- Born: 8 October 1874 Gernyeszeg, Austria-Hungary (now Gornești, Romania)
- Died: 5 October 1946 (aged 71) Moscow, Soviet Union (now Russian Federation)
- Resting place: Fiume Road Graveyard, Budapest
- Party: Unity Party (1922–1935)
- Other political affiliations: Liberal Party (1901-1903); F48P (1904–1913); Constitution Party (1913–1918)
- Education: Theresianum; University of Budapest (JD); Royal Academy of Economics
- Occupation: Politician; jurist
- Cabinet: Bethlen Government
- Noble family: House of Bethlen
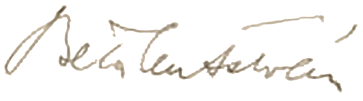
- Signature

Count István Bethlen de Bethlen (8 October 1874 – 5 October 1946) was a Hungarian aristocrat and statesman and served as prime minister from 1921 to 1931.

== Early life ==
The scion of an old Bethlen de Bethlen noble family from Transylvania, he was the only son of Count István Bethlen de Bethlen (1831–1881) and Countess Ilona Teleki de Szék (1849–1914). He had two elder sisters: Countess Klementine Mikes de Zabola (1871–1954) and Countess Ilona Haller de Hallerkeö (1872–1924).

== Early career ==
Bethlen was elected to the Hungarian Parliament as a liberal in 1901. The British historian C. A. Macartney described Bethlen as "not a striking personality" as he was a poor public speaker and very reserved in his manners. However, Macartney noted that Bethlen had "all the inward assurance and the external prestige of a man whose family's prerogatives it had been for centuries to be obeyed". Bethlen was a highly intelligent, cultured and sophisticated man who fluently spoke several languages and had gone on the Grand Tour of Europe several times as a young man. Besides for his native Magyar, Bethlen was fluent in English, French, German and Romanian. As a politician, Bethlen was cunning and ruthless as though he was a bad public speaker who was unable to work a crowd, he was very persuasive in one on one meetings and he proved to be an adept player at the political game. Macartney noted that Bethlen's most salient characteristic was the absence of any "inhibitions" when it came to obtaining and keeping power as Macartney wrote that Bethlen had "...a profound cynicism which colored his every belief save one: the natural right of Hungary to rule the Danube basin through his own class". Macartney described Bethlen as being "...a conservative in the truest sense of the word" as Bethlen favored the traditional system of Hungary being ruled by aristocracy and he was not willing to accept any other system for Hungary. Bethlen was not a dogmatic conservative and was pragmatic enough to make compromises if he had to, though for him compromises were made only to conserve the existing system. The picture sometimes painted by Bethlen's admirers of him as a "Whig" who favored gradual changes to advance to universal suffrage was not based in reality as Bethlen was a "Tory" who was very much committed to upholding the existing political and social system. Bethen was an intense Hungarian nationalist and very proud of his roots in Transylvania and his own family, which had been one of the greatest of the aristocratic families in Transylvania for centuries.

Macartney described Bethlen as "profoundly undemocratic in his soul" as he was against universal suffrage and land reform as he believed that the land-owning Magyar aristocracy alone were the only people capable of governing Hungary well. When Bethlen was elected to Parliament in 1901, he reluctantly took the oath of loyalty to the King-Emperor Franz Josef, but he made it clear right from the onset of his career that he was not loyal to the House of Habsburg and would had preferred for the Kingdom of Hungary to break away from the Austrian empire. Bethlen's cynicism about humanity gave him a certain tolerance as he believed that most people were stupid, selfish, self-interested, dishonest and vicious, and thus had to be tolerated in spite of their flaws. His cynicism made him a natural opponent of any movement that promised to create a perfect world full of perfect people and he was dismissive of both communism and fascism for precisely that reason. He favored a paternalistic state which would seek to improve living standards for the rural peasantry and the urban working class, but only as a way of avoiding dissatisfaction that might cause a revolution. Bethlen disliked Jews, but he believed that Hungary needed its Jewish middle class to advance from being a backward, mostly rural country to being an advanced, urban country. He felt that as long wealthy Hungarian Jews played the same role that they had in the 19th century, namely as socially inferior supplicants to the aristocracy whose approval they desperately craved, then Jews should be tolerated as they "knew their place" in the social order, but if any Jews sought equality or superiority with the aristocracy instead of being their supplicants, he could be quite "forceful" in expressing his anger.

Later, he served as a representative of the new Hungarian government at the Paris Peace Conference in 1919. In that year, the weak centrist Hungarian government collapsed and was soon replaced by the communist Hungarian Soviet Republic, under the leadership of Béla Kun. Bethlen quickly returned to Hungary to assume leadership of the anti-communist "white" government, based in Szeged, along with former Austro-Hungarian Navy Admiral Miklós Horthy. After the "white" forces had seized control of Hungary, Horthy was appointed Regent of Hungary. Bethlen again took a seat in the Hungarian Parliament and allied with the conservative factions there. In 1919, Bethlen rejected a personal union between Romania and Hungary under the King of Romania.

== Prime Minister ==
After the attempted return of King Charles IV to the throne of Hungary in 1921, Horthy asked Bethlen to form a strong government to eliminate the possibility of other such threats to the new country. Bethlen had always disliked the House of Habsburg and made it very clear that, though he wanted a Hungary to be a monarchy, he was against the restoration of the House of Habsburg. The politics of the Kingdom of Hungary were notable for the complete absence of the political left. The main divisions in Hungarian politics were instead between a right-wing group known as the conservatives and a more right-wing group known as the radicals. Horthy appointed Bethlen prime minister as a compromise candidate. His origins as a Calvinist from Transylvania led to the assumption that Bethlen would follow an aggressively revisionist foreign policy, which made him acceptable to the radicals while his status as a member of the great aristocratic families of Transylvania made him acceptable to the conservatives.

In practice, Bethlen governed as a conservative and his first task was to end the White Terror that started in August 1919 with the downfall of the Hungarian Soviet Republic. The American historian Andrew Janos described Bethlen as using measures such as "outright bribery" to tame the radical students and officers who travelled around Hungary, torturing and killing leftists and Jews (which were seen as the same in the eyes of the radicals). The more outspoken student radicals were silenced by giving them high paying jobs in the civil service, and then by quietly transferring them to rural backwaters far from Budapest. The para-military radical groups were co-opted by giving their leaders seat in the Lower House of Parliament or else were promoted to a higher rank in the Honved (Royal Hungarian Army). Bethlen pacified the Honved by giving all servicemen substantial pay rises and pension increases as well permitting the Army to covertly violate the Treaty of Trianon, which had limited the Honved to 35, 000 men and banned the Hungarian Army from having certain types of weapons. Bethlen regarded the para-military groups as a "necessary evil" who had done much to destroy the Hungarian Communist Party by killing most of its members in Hungary, but felt that in the long run the para-military groups were a threat to Hungary as noted that the leaders of these groups were intent upon starting a war to regain the lands lost under the Treaty of Trianon. Bethlen, who had a better understanding of the balance of power than the leaders of the para-military bands, was opposed to starting a war which he knew Hungary would lose and would result in Hungary even losing more land. As distasteful it was to him, Bethlen favored acceptance of the Treaty of Trianon for the moment and instead wanted to work for restoring Hungary to prosperity and building alliances with other powers before embarking any risky foreign policy moves. Bethlen often noted that it was unacceptable to have radical junior officers in charge of foreign policy and that Hungary needed mature and responsible leaders who a better understanding of the issues. However, Horthy as Regent also served as the "Supreme War Lord" and had the military report directly to himself rather than the prime minister. On an intellectual level, Horthy was comfortable with Bethlen's leadership and his advice, which he greatly valued. But on an emotional level, Horthy tended to sympathize with the plans of the radical officers for an aggressive foreign policy and as early as 1919 had approved of a plan to invade Romania no later than 1921. Bethlen talked Horthy out of the plan to attack Romania, arguing it would cause a war Hungary would lose, and instead urged a policy of "consolidation", charging that Hungary first to rebuild the shattered economy. The prime minister's policy of attempting to co-opt the radicals by giving them government jobs, ensured that much of the officer corps and civil servants such as Miklós Kozma were radicals.

Bethlen founded the Party of National Unity. Bethlen was also able to unite the two most powerful factors in Hungarian society, the wealthy primarily-Jewish industrialists in Budapest and the old Magyar gentry in rural Hungary, into a lasting coalition. That effectively checked the rise of fascism in the country for at least a decade. Bethlen reached an accord with the labour unions, earned their support for the government and eliminated a source of domestic dissent. He lifted the ban on the Marxist Social Democrats, but only on the condition that the Social Democrats not contest any rural ridings. The Hungarian Communist Party, which had been banned in 1919, remained illegal. Bethlen ensured that the Unity Party would always win elections by the Franchise Act of 1922, which made income level the qualification for voting and holding office. Under the Franchise Act, only 29.5 of Hungarians had a sufficiently high enough income to be allowed to vote with the rest disfranchised. Furthermore, the Franchise Act replaced the secret ballot with the open ballot in rural areas, returning Hungary to the system that existed prior to the Aster Revolution of 1918. To be allowed to vote, a Hungarian had to prove they not only had a high income, but also had lived in the same area for the last six years and completed six years of schooling, a requirement that favored the well off. To be allowed to run for office, a candidate had to collect "recommendations", namely a certain number of signatures from those who were allowed to vote. The threshold for collecting the "recommendations" was much higher for opposition parties than the Unity Party. Finally, under the Franchise Act the rural areas of Hungary were given 199 seats in the Lower House of Parliament while the urban areas were given 46 seats. The limited number of men in rural areas with high incomes along with the open ballot created a Hungarian version of rotten boroughs as it was very easy to bribe the small numbers of voters in the rural ridings to vote for the Unity Party.

The task of supervising elections was the job of the lord lieutenant who governed every rural county, who were all appointed by the prime minister, and Bethlen made certain that only loyalists to the Unity Party were appointed as lord lieutenants. The second most important portfolio in the cabinet was the Interior Minister, who controlled the State Police and the Royal Hungarian Gendarmerie, both of which engaged in much harassment of opposition candidates in rural areas trying to collect signatures to run against the Unity Party in elections. The system that Bethlen created ensured that the Unity Party won every election in the Kingdom of Hungary, winning an average of 61% of the vote in the four general elections between 1922-1935. By contrast, elections in urban ridings were much fairer and cleaner as Bethlen allowed opposition politicians more leeway to run against the Unity Party and win seats in urban areas. Bethlen wanted a certain number of opposition politicians in Parliament to rebut allegations of electoral fraud in the countryside. Furthermore, allowing free elections in urban areas served as a "barometer" of public opinion, which thus allowed him to see how popular his government was without risking losing elections as the greater number of rural seats ensured that the Unity Party always had a majority. Bethlen also wanted opposition MPs in Parliament as a valve for public discontent as the opposition MPs regularly criticised corruption in his government, which also served as a way to check corruption as Bethlen would sack ministers whose corruption was too manifest.

Bethlen was a noted Anglophile who greatly admired the British Conservative Party and he always had great faith in Britain would at some point step in to peacefully revise the Treaty of Trianon in Hungary's favor. From the early 19th century onwards, Hungarian conservatives had tended to be Anglophiles. The reason for Anglomania in Hungary was due to Britain embodying the two ideas of modernity and tradition at once. The Industrial Revolution, which had made Britain into the world's greatest power, was widely seen as a model for Hungary to follow. At the same time, Britain had avoided what Hungarian conservatives considered to be the wrong path of the French Revolution, and preserved the monarchy along with the aristocracy. Hungarian conservatives wanted to modernise a backward, poor, and mainly rural country into a modern, wealthy and urban country by having an Industrial Revolution of their own while at the same time preserving the leading role of the Magyar aristocracy, hence their admiration for Great Britain as a model to be followed. Bethlen was very much a traditional Anglophile conservative and his wish to modernise Hungary economically explained his pragmatic opposition to antisemitism as he believed that the Hungarian economy would collapse without the Jewish middle class.

For various sociological reasons, minorities can be disproportionately. overrepresented in the middle class as was the case with Greek and Armenians in the Ottoman empire, Igbos in Nigeria, Indians in the British colony of Uganda, huaren (ethnic Chinese) in all of the nations of Southeast Asia and Jews in Hungary. In the Hungarian case, the social idea in Hungary was to be a land-owning "gentleman" or a "lady" married to the said "gentleman". In Hungary, working in any sort of a middle class professional job such as being a businessman, engineer, doctor, architect, lawyer, banker, scientist, dentist and so on was considered to be a deeply shameful and dishonorable way of making a living. Besides for being a land-owning "gentleman", the only other occupations considered to be honorable were working for the government as a civil servant, a policeman, a gendarme and above all serving in the military. Because most Hungarians refused to study for middle class jobs and because Hungarian Jews on the account of their religion could never be "gentlemen" and "ladies", Hungarian Jews made up a disportionate number of the people working as middle class professionals by the end of the 19th century. Though Hungarians often liked to exaggerate the number of Jews working in middle class jobs, Bethlen's belief that the Hungarian economy would collapse without the middle class Jews had a solid foundation in reality. Bethlen tried to discourage antisemitism and likewise encouraged Hungarian Jews to stay in Hungary. In 1925, the Board of Deputies of British Jews lodged a complaint against Hungary at the League Council (the executive of the League of Nations), charging that the numerus clausus law of 1920, which imposed a 5% quota on the number of Jewish university students, was a violation of the article 58 of the Treaty of Trianon. The League Council ruled in favor of the Board of Deputies and in 1928 Bethlen liberalised the numerus clausus law by declaring that Hungarian universities could accept as many Jewish students as they wanted.

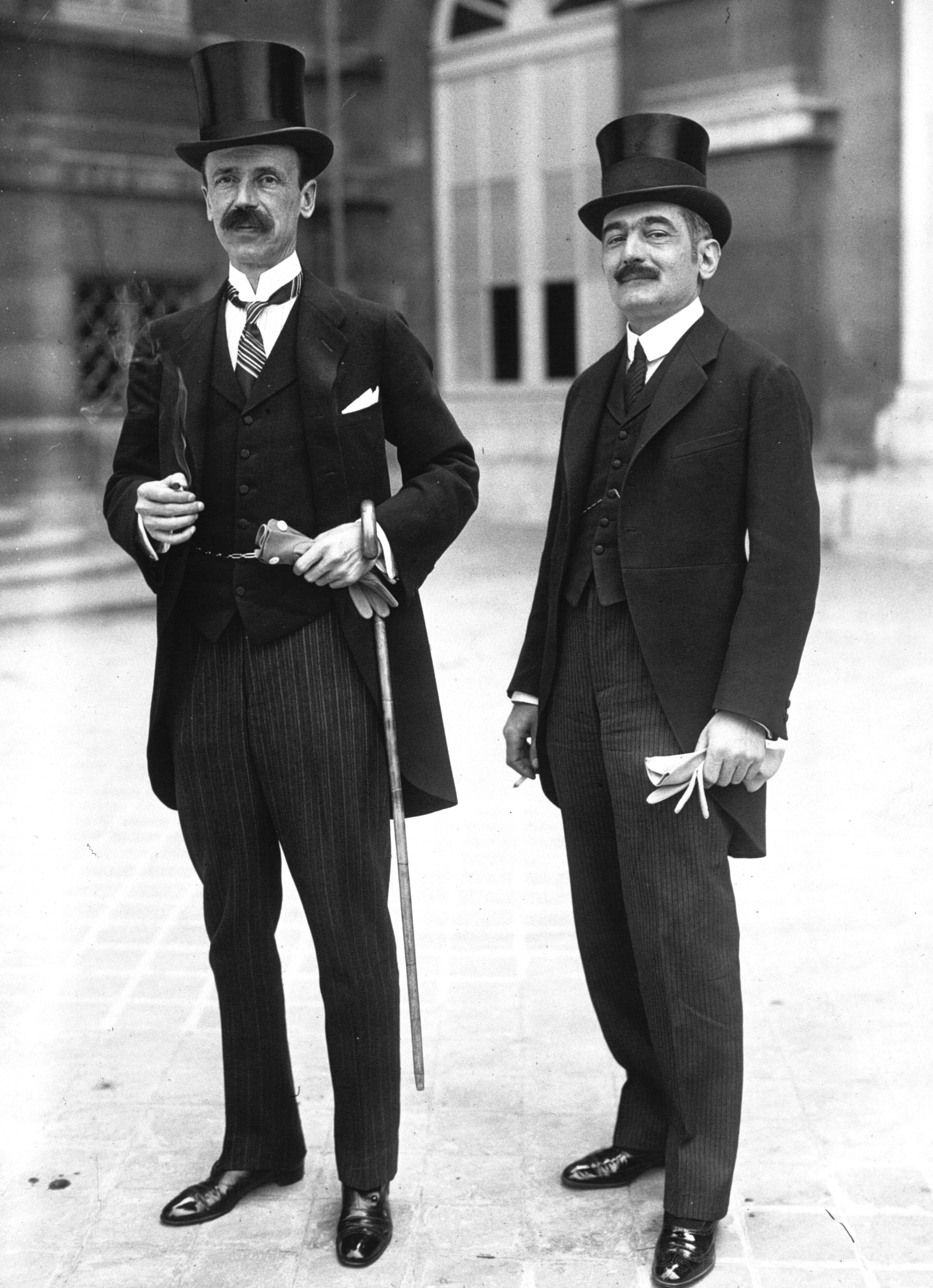
Bethlen standing on the left in Paris 1923 during negotiations for a loan to Hungary.

Hungary was in a desperate financial situation after World War One, and Bethlen's major interest in foreign policy was securing an international loan to stabilise the economy, which led him for the moment to cease his agitation against the Treaty of Trianon. In return, the question of a loan was related to reparations as the Treaty of Trianon called for Hungary to pay reparations to Romania and Yugoslavia to compensate for the destruction done by the Imperial Austrian and Royal Hungarian Army to Serbia and Romania in World War One. No-one was willing to lend Hungary any money until a plan for reparations were secured first. France insisted that any international loan to Hungary came under the supervision of the Reparations Commission. On 18 September 1922, Bethlen had Hungary join the League of Nations, which in turn meant accepting the League's rules about not invading other members of the League (Romania, Czechoslovakia and Yugoslavia were already members of the League of Nations), which was the first requirement for the loan. In early 1923, Bethlen asked for a huge international loan and was told that one of the conditions of the loan would be accepting the frontiers imposed by the Treaty of Trianon. The talks for the loan started in London in March 1923 with the British insisted that the loan was to be under the supervision of the League of Nations and that Hungary committed itself to following the League's rule (i.e not invade other nations). In a speech on 16 October 1923, Bethlan explained his actions under the grounds that: "Today Europe’s situation is such that it wants peace at all costs, and if we do not accommodate ourselves to the intricacies of Europe’s interests, if we do not adapt our policies to Europe’s interests, then no matter how right we are, we will be portrayed as peace-breakers and in no area will our efforts be crowned with success...Believe me, if it is difficult for anyone to practice this self-denial, it is difficult for me." In December 1923, Bethlen reached an agreement for Hungary to pay 200 million gold crowns in reparations to Romania and Yugoslavia over the next 20 years, which opened the way for the loan. In July 1924, the loan to Hungary was floated in the City of London for 250 million gold crowns. Half of the loan came from the City and the other half came from the United States, Italy and Switzerland. The loan played a key role in stabilising the Hungarian economy and helped to tame inflation, which had been a major problem since World War One.

Romania, Yugoslavia and Czechoslovakia had in 1921 signed a defensive alliance known as the Little Entente committing themselves to come to the aid of the other members of the Little Entente if they were attacked by Hungary, which in effect ruled out any possibility of Hungary going to war to regain the lands lost under the Treaty of Trianon as the combined forces of the Little Entente were too strong. Furthermore, France had signed defensive treaties of alliance with Czechoslovakia in 1924, with Romania in 1926 and Yugoslavia in 1927, which gave the Little Entente a great power protector. As France was the principal great power allied to the three nations that Hungary had territorial disputes with, Bethlen's foreign policy was anti-French and he saw France's enemies such as Italy and Germany as natural allies for Hungary. However, the German foreign minister Gustav Stresemann had no interest in Bethlen's offers of an anti-French alliance. Stresemann's principal interest in foreign policy was an anti-Polish policy aimed at taking back all of the lands Germany had lost to Poland such as Upper Silesia and the Polish Corridor. However, France and Poland had signed a defensive alliance in 1921, which committed both powers to come to the aid of the other one if they were attacked by Germany. As such, Stresemann worked to improve Franco-German relations out of the hope that the French might abrogate their alliance with Poland, which would allow the Reich to attack Poland without fear of a war with France. Given Stresemann's priorities, Bethlen's offer of an anti-French alliance worked directly counter to his own foreign policy goals. Bethlen had more success with building an alliance with Italy as Benito Mussolini was both anti-French and anti-Yugoslav in his foreign policy, and he welcomed the idea of an Italo-Hungarian alliance against Yugoslavia and its ally France.

During the May 1926 trial of the Franc affair plotters, Bethlen was called to testify over his involvement in it. French Prime Minister Aristide Briand used the scandal by pushing for Bethlen's removal from power and his replacement by a more liberal politician. The plot centred on the efforts of Hungarian nationalists to damage the French economy by disseminating forged 1,000 French franc banknotes. Several plotters provided incriminating evidence of Bethlen's involvement, but he managed to cover up his role by exercising direct control over the proceedings. Facing considerable public pressure, Bethlen offered his resignation to Horthy, who refused to accept it. Bethlen subsequently shuffled his cabinet by replacing Interior Minister Iván Rakovszky. The outcome of the trials, in fact, increased Bethlen's popularity in Hungary.

Reflecting his parentistic ideas about social reform, with the economic recovery of the late 1920s, Bethlen brought in social reforms, creating the basis of a welfare state in Hungary. For the urban working class, Bethlen expanded upon a system of medical insurance, raising the number of workers available to collect medical insurance from 30% in 1913 to 80% in 1927. In 1927-1928, the Bethlen government a series of acts that greatly extended the number of people eligible to collect health insurance and sick pay was raised from 50% of wages to 75% of wages. His government also greatly expanded the number of Hungarians eligible to collect old age pensions, disability pensions and widow's pensions as well as increasing the amount of money paid out. In 1929, Bethlen planned to include the rural population in the social safety net he was creating, but the impact of the Great Depression ensured the cancellation of these plans as it was simply financially impossible for Hungary to pay pensions for peasants in the context of the Great Depression. Bethlen appointed Count Kuno von Klebelsberg as education minister with a mandate to raise literacy levels in Hungary and to improve the universities. Klebelsberg had the education ministry build 3, 500 new elementary schools in the rural areas of Hungary in an attempt to end illiteracy in the countryside. A major reason for the push to end illiteracy was an attempt to prove the "cultural superiority" of the Hungarians over their new neighbors and thus present an argument to foreigners for undoing the Treaty of Trianon. Foreigners often mocking noted that the illiteracy rate in Hungary was approximately the same as the illiteracy rate in Yugoslavia, Romania and eastern Czechoslovakia while the illiteracy rate in western Czechoslovakia was far lower than in Hungary. Bethlen and Klebelsberg wanted a higher literacy rate in Hungary to prove the "cultural superiority" of Magyars and thus to argue that it was unacceptable to Magyars under the rule of Romanians, Yugoslavs and Czechoslovaks. In addition, Klebelsberg had the former universities of Kolszsvár and Pozsony relocated to Szeged and Pėcs respectively as well founding a new university at Debrecen. Klebelsberg also had the Hungarian state pay for new facilities and buildings to be constructed at the universities as well hiring more staff for the higher education.

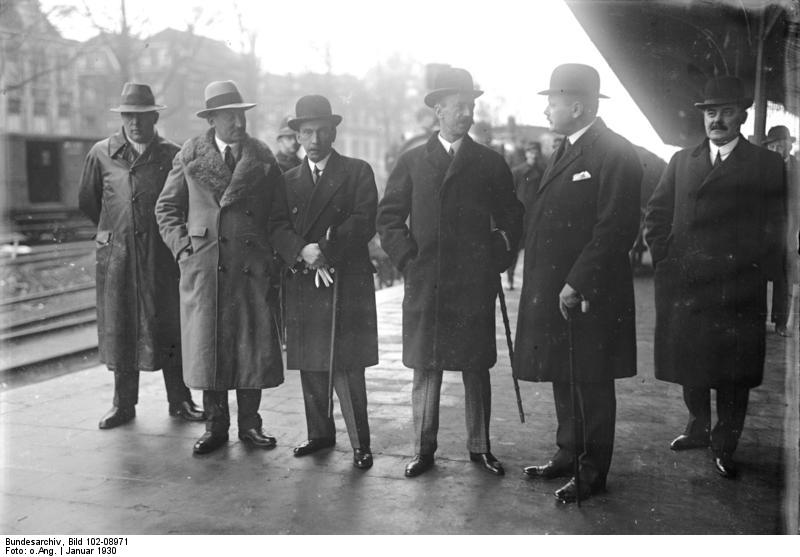
Bethlen and the Hungarian delegation in the Hague

During his decade in office, Bethlen led Hungary into the League of Nations, arranged a close alliance with Fascist Italy and even entered into a Treaty of Friendship with Italy in 1927 to further his nation's revisionist hopes. He was defeated in his attempts to change the Treaty of Trianon, which had stripped Hungary of most of its territory after the First World War. Once the Hungarian economy improved, Bethlen had less need for international loans and he came to be open in attacking the Treaty of Trianon. In a speech in 1928, Bethlen declared: "We did not lose provinces. We were partitioned...We cannot surrender one third of our race for all eternity. This we cannot accept as justice...If someone has buttoned his vest wrong, he can only correct his dress if he unbuttons it and then buttons it correctly. To build a permanent peace on these borders is impossible. What can only be built on these borders is a prison, in which we are the guarded and the victors the guards...what we need is new borders".

The Great Depression shifted Hungarian politics to the extreme right, and Horthy replaced Bethlen with Count Gyula Károlyi de Nagykároly, which was followed quickly by Gyula Gömbös de Jákfa, a noted fascist and antisemite. Gömbös had been the principal organiser of the National Army founded in Szeged to fight the Hungarian Soviet Republic in 1919 and had gone on to found an avowed racist and anti-semitic group called "the race protectors". However, Bethlen still controlled the Unity Party and imposed upon Gömbös certain conditions such as promising to govern through Parliament and the cabinet, not to enact land reform and to refrain from passing racist laws. Bethlen also handicapped Gömbös by including a number of his allies in Gömbös's cabinet such as Ferenc Keresztes-Fischer as Interior Minister and Miklós Kállay as Agriculture Minister, which limited Gömbös's room to maneuver.

== In the opposition ==
Starting on 11 October 1932, Hungarian universities were rocked by anti-Semitic demonstrations with Christian students complaining that Jewish students made up a disproportionate number of the students in violation of the numerus clausus law of 1920, which had imposed a strict 5% quota on the number of Jewish students allowed to study at any one time. Students complained that Jews made only 6% of the population of Hungary, but were 25% of the students at the University of Debrecen and made up 27% of the students at the medical school at Budapest University. The well organised demonstrations took place at every university in Hungary and were a recurring feature of university life until 1936. Gömbös and his education minister Bálint Hóman came out in support of the demonstrations and met several times in public with the leaders of the protests to declare their support. Gömbös used the demonstrations to discredit Bethlen, charging that he had during his decade as prime minister failed to enforce the numerus clausus law and thereby put the interests of the Jewish minority ahead of the Christian majority.

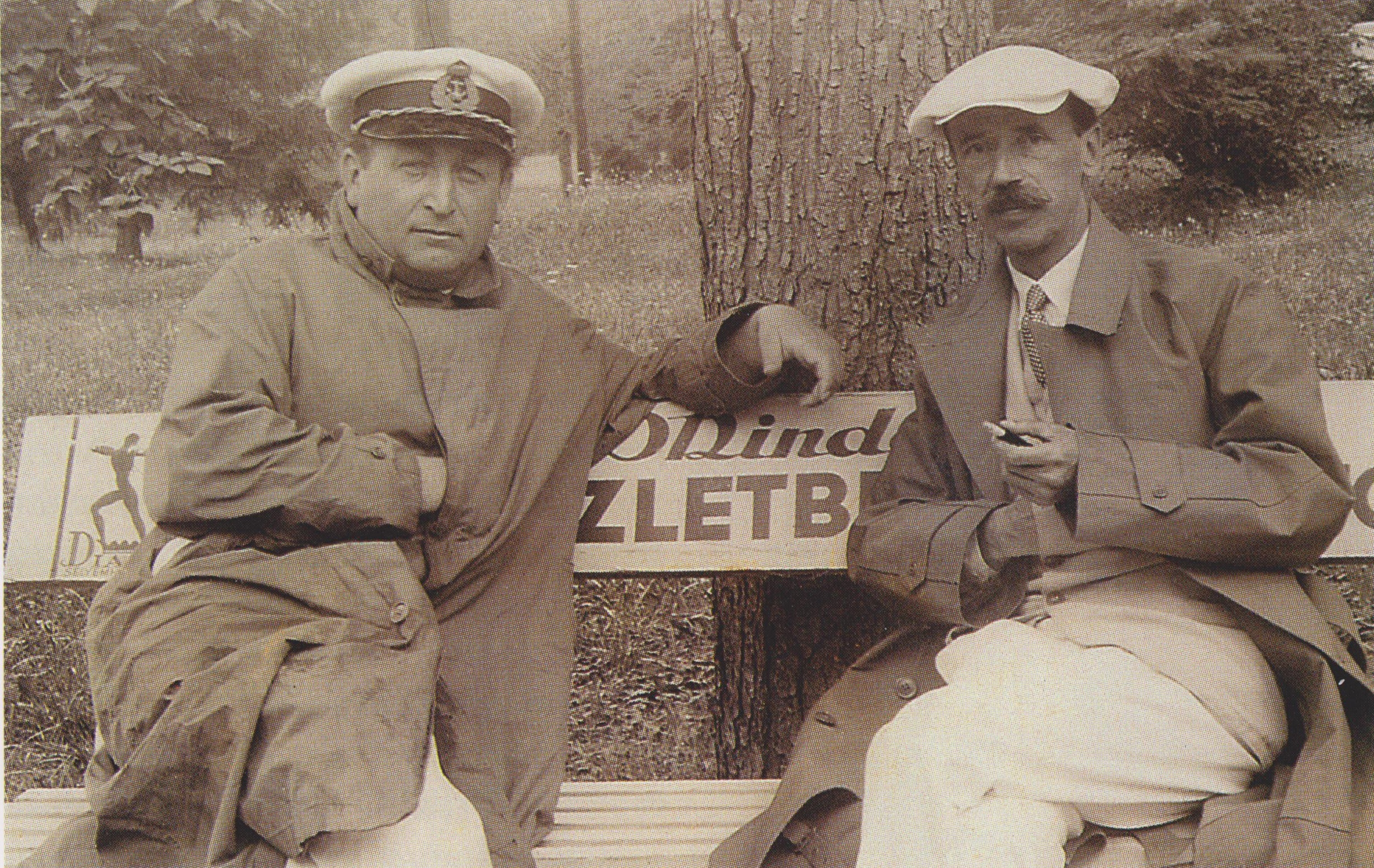
Bethlen sitting on the right with his long-time rival Gömbös on the left, 1932

The German language Pester Lloyd newspaper, which closely reflected Bethlen's views on the issues of the day and was widely considered to be his mouthpiece, condemned the protests, charging that the protesting students were behaving in a "lawless" manner by beating up and expelling Jewish students from the university lecture halls and stated that the protests were hurting Hungary's image abroad. In particular, the Pester Lloyd newspaper mockingly noted that the claim by the anti-Semitic students that Hungarian Jews were too intelligent for them to compete with and that only by imposing quotas on the admission of Jewish students could Christian students stand a fair chance of success in society was not saying very much for the intelligence of the average Christian university student. Gömbös used the demonstrations and the allegation that Bethlen had failed to enforce the numerus clausus law as a way to discredit Bethlen and win control of the Unity Party by purging pro-Bethlen MPs from the party. Gömbös recruited a number of the radical university students into the Unity Party under the banner of the "Reform Generation" movement as he presented himself as a reformer out to challenge a corrupt system, which changed the composition of the Unity Party. Under Bethen, the Unity Party had been more of a patronage machine rather than a proper political party, which dispensed favors to those who voted the "right" way while punishing those who voted the "wrong" way. On 31 January 1935, Gömbös formally launched the Reform Generation movement at a rally in Budapest attended by a thousand university students where the demand was made that Bethlen's political influence over the Unity Party being ended forever. Gömbös as the leader of the "Reform Generation" transformed the Unity Party into a mass movement. In the 1935 election, of the 245 Unity Party MPs elected, only 45 were loyal to Bethlen and the other 200 were loyal to Gömbös.

Likewise, Bethlen found himself opposed to the foreign policy favored the radical honved officer corps who favored an alliance with Germany and a very aggressive foreign policy. Bethlen had a great deal of respect for British sea power as a factor in world politics, and believed that despite the appeasement policy that Germany and Great Britain were bound to come into conflict at some point, a war that he believed Britain would win. During his four years as prime minister, Gömbös had purged the honved officer corps of conservatives and promoted a number of radical officers who shared his views. By the time Gömbös died in 1936, the honved was a stronghold of the radicals. Bethlen tried to use his influence with Horthy to try restrain the honved as he charged that the military had become dangerously insubordinate towards civil authority and that the honved was meddling in matters that beyond its concern both domestically and in foreign policy. In late 1938-early 1939, Bethlen played a major role in orchestrating the downfall of the radical prime minister Béla Imrédy. In December 1938, rumors started to appear in the conservative newspapers that the great-grandfather of the radical anti-Semite Imrédy was a Jewish convert to Christianity. In February 1939, definitive proof that Imrédy's great-grandfather was indeed a Jew was presented to Horthy by the chief of the state police (who was a close friend of Bethlen), which so shocked Imrédy that he fainted on the spot. As a consequence, Imrédy resigned and the conservative Count Pál Teleki was appointed prime minister.

== World War Two ==
Increasingly shunted into political obscurity, Bethlen stood out as one of the few voices in Hungary to be actively opposed to an alliance with Nazi Germany. Bethlen was appalled at the way that Germans were opposed to the idea of Hungary becoming a modern country, and wanted Hungary to stay a poor, predominantly rural country whose task was to supply the Reich with cheap food and other raw materials. Bethlen saw the German view of Hungary's place in the "New Order in Europe" as trapping Hungary into a quasi-colonial relationship with Germany and the end of any prospect of Hungary becoming a modern country. In 1938, Bethlen told a parliamentary commission: "During the talks we had recently,...the Germans repeatedly warned us: 'Don't keep insisting on a Hungarian industry. You are an agrarian country; be a country of peasants and sell us your agricultural products; we shall supply you with industrial goods'". Bethlen had considerable respect for the British empire, and believed that the immense resources of not only Great Britain, but also her colonies along with the Dominions would ultimately prevail over the Reich. This was especially the case as Bethlen felt that the United States as a fellow "Anglo-Saxon" power would come into the war as Britain's ally sooner or later, and the combination of Anglo-American power would be too much for Germany. Given these views, Bethlen was opposed to the idea of an alliance with Germany, predicating that Britain would win the Second World War and that Hungary would be fighting on the losing side allied to Germany.

Despite his own family's origins in Transylvania and his long-standing opposition to the Treaty of Trianon, Bethlen was opposed to accepting the Second Vienna Award of 1940, which returned northern Transylvania to Hungary while allowing Romania to keep southern Transylvania. Bethlen complained that the price of accepting the Second Vienna Award was too high as the German Foreign Minister Joachim von Ribbentrop forced upon the prime minister Pál Teleki a German-Hungarian economic agreement that was highly unfavorable to Hungary. In exchange for receiving northern Transylvania, Teleki had to sign an agreement on 10 October 1940 that saw the pengő artificially devalued in regard to the Reichmark, meaning that Germans brought Hungarian goods such as grain on the cheap while making German goods more expensive in Hungary. At the same time, the German-Hungarian economic agreement of 10 October 1940 forced the Hungarians to commit to buying German imports to the same value of Hungarian exports to the Reich, which ensured that the Hungarians had to buy German industrial goods regardless if they wanted to or not. Thus, the Hungarians had to pay more for German goods valued in Reichsmarks while the Germans paid very little for Hungarian goods valued in pengős. Besides for the economic agreement, Teleki had to sign another agreement that declared the Nazi-aligned Volksbund der Deutschen in Ungarn (People's League of Germans in Hungary) to be the only legal party for the Hungarian volksdeutsche (ethnic Germans) while giving the volksbund wide powers to govern affairs in the volksdeutsche community, in effect creating a state within the state. Bethlen charged that the Second Vienna Award had been a Faustian pact under which Hungary received only part of Transylvania instead all of Transylvania as he wanted in return for becoming a semi-colony of Germany with an exploitative and one-sided economic agreement and the German state taking control of the Hungarian volksdeutsche community. Bethlen supported Teleki's policy of trying to improve relations with Yugoslavia, a neutral state governed by the Anglophile Prince Paul as a way counter-balancing the power of the Reich. Bethlen approved of the Treaty of Eternal Friendship that Teleki signed with Yugoslavia on 12 December 1940, even though it entailed accepting the present Yugoslav-Hungarian border in return for more education rights for Magyar minority in Yugoslavia.

In June 1941 following the Bombing of Kassa, Bethlen strongly advised Horthy against declaring war on the Soviet Union, which he predicted would be a disaster for Hungary. Bethlen did not share the blind faith in a Nazi "final victory" that other Hungarian decision-makers had such as László Bárdossy, Henrik Werth and Károly Bartha, and argued it was not inevitable that Germany would defeat the Soviet Union. He further informed the Regent that Royal Hungarian Army was not ready for modern war and predicted that Hungarian losses on the Eastern Front would be very heavy. Finally, Bethlen told Horthy that the war against Soviet Union would be extremely unpopular and Hungary had no duty to defeat the Soviet Union "by sacrificing the flower of her people". In 1944, Bethlen wrote about the decision to declare war on the Soviet Union "the gullible Hungarian public was made to believe this by propaganda meant to trick us into the war by painting the bogey of Bolshevism on the wall".

As it became apparent that Germany was going to lose the Second World War, Bethlen attempted to negotiate a separate peace with the Allied powers. Bethlen was well regarded in London, and there were plans in Whitehall for a time in 1942 to set up a Hungarian government-in-exile in London to headed by Bethlen. However, on 5 August 1942, the British Foreign Secretary Anthony Eden gave a statement to House of Commons that abrogated the Munich Agreement of 1938 and declared British support for returning Czechoslovakia after the war to the frontiers that had existed before 1938. Eden's statement was primarily concerned with returning the Sudetenland to Czechoslovakia, but the promise to return to the frontiers before the Munich Agreement would also meant that Hungary would have to return all gained by the First Vienna Award of November 1938 along with Cartho-Ukraine which the Hungarians had annexed in 1939. At same time, the British prime minister Winston Churchill declared that his government did not recognise the Second Vienna Award of 1940 nor the Hungarian annexation of land that had belonged to Yugoslavia until April 1941. The promise to return Hungary to the frontiers of the Treaty of Trianon put an end to the plans for a government-in-exile in London.

Starting in January 1942, Bethlen started to host gatherings at his own home where discussions were held about how best to find a way for Hungary to exit the war. Bethlen helped to found the Independence Front to press for an anti-war movement that consisted of conservatives loyal to himself, Legitimists (supporters of the deposed House of Habsburg), Social Democrats, Smallholders, and liberals. In November 1942, Bethlen became the unofficial leader of a peace faction. In late January 1943, the prime minister Miklós Kállay arranged for a committee consisting of Bethlen, Cardinal Jusztinián György Serédi, the Catholic Prince Primate of Hungary, and Chief Justice Géza Töreki of the Supreme Court of Hungary to meet Horthy at the Royal Castle. Bethlen, Cardinal Serédi and Justice Töreki presented to the regent a three point memo, which advised Horthy that he should:

- "Request the withdrawal as soon as possible of the Hungarian fighting forces from the [Eastern] front".
- "Reinforce the army at home in expectation of a power vacuum after the war".
- "Urgently reestablish constitutional rights and respect for the law, including punishment of the military responsible for the atrocities at Újvidék [modern Novi Sad] as well as implementation of Jewish laws in the spirit of humanity and Christianity".

In a speech in the Upper Chamber on 19 February 1943, Bethlen speaking of the recent Battle of Stalingrad along with the battles on the Don river that saw the destruction of the Hungarian 2nd Army declared that the war was lost for the Axis powers and Hungary should make peace with the Allies while it was still possible. He further demanded that the what was left of the Hungarian Expeditionary Force serving in the Soviet Union be returned to Hungary at once and an investigation should be started into why the former prime László Bárdossy declared war on the Soviet Union. On 27 February 1943, Bethlen founded in Budapest the Hungarian National Social Circle, a group of about 200 people, mostly from the Hungarian elite who lobbied Horthy and Kállay to pull Hungary out of the war. Initially in the spring 1943, Kállay had wanted Bethlen to go to Switzerland to contact British and American diplomats about an armistice, but it was decided that Bethlen was too well known for such a mission and instead György Barcza, the former Minister Plenipotentiary in London was chosen to go. In 1943-1944, there was a major Anglo-American strategic argument about where to best way to win the war. The British prime minister Winston Churchill favored the "Mediterranean strategy" of occupying Italy and landing in the Balkans with the aim of seizing as much of Eastern Europe before the Red Army arrived while the American president Franklin D. Roosevelt favored landing in north-west Europe as the best way to defeat Germany. Bethlen was of course not party to this dispute, but he saw the Allied landings in Sicily in July 1943 followed up by landings on the mainland of Italy in September 1943 as a sign that the Allies wanted to enter Eastern Europe and that it would be possible for Hungary to be occupied by Anglo-American forces rather than Soviet forces. The sluggish advance of the Allied armies up the Italian peninsula greatly worried him as he noted that the Red Army was steadily pushing the Wehrmacht back, which led him to fear that Soviet forces would reach Hungary first. In August 1943, the Social Democrats and the Smallholders formed a formal alliance, which Bethlen was opposed to. Bethlen founded a new group, the Democratic Citizens' Alliance, and made it clear to the Smallholders that he wanted them to break their alliance with the Marxist Social Democrats as the price of joining. However, the Smallholders as their name suggests represented the interests of peasants with small landholdings. The Smallholders had long called for breaking up the vast estates of the aristocracy to give the land to the peasants. Despite the general right-wing ordination of the Smallholders, their opposition to the existing social system led to an alliance with the Marxist Social Democrats and led to reject Bethlen's offers even ideologically Bethlen was more closer to them on many issues than the Social Democrats.

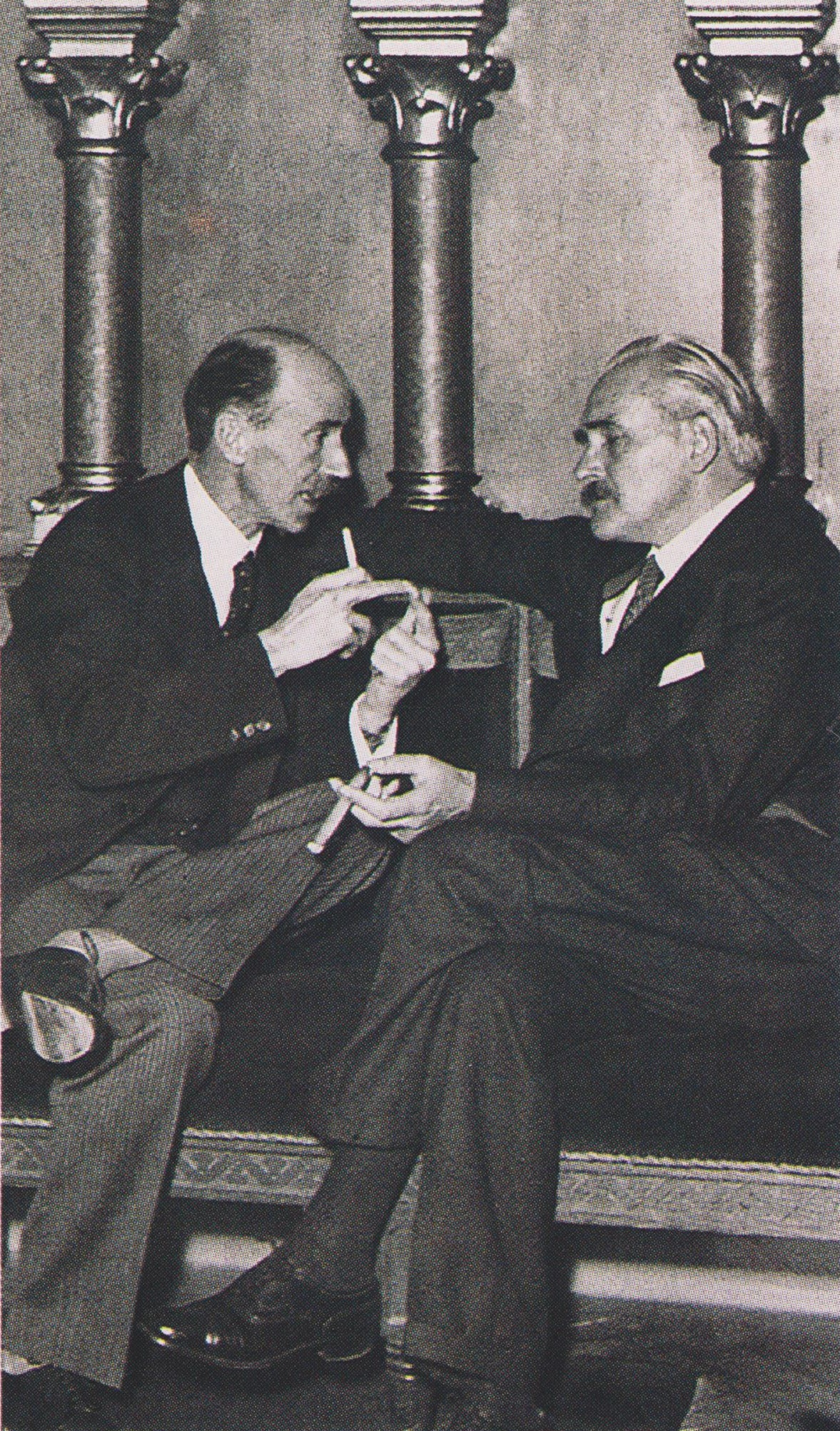
Bethlen on the left in conversation with Prime Minister Miklós Kállay on the right.

Following Operation Margarethe, the German occupation of Hungary on 19 March 1944, a warrant was issued for Bethlen's arrest and he went into hiding. Just after the invasion, Bethlen entered the Royal Castle via an underground passage where he advised Horthy to not appoint a government and told the regent that he should do nothing that would legitimatise the occupation. Bethlen warned Horthy: "If there is no government the Germans will have no one with which to negotiate with. Public opinion at home and abroad will see that there has been an end to legitimate government". Magda Horthy, the regent's wife and the first lady of Hungary, was gravely worried about what would happen if the Germans discovered that Bethlen was hiding in the Royal Castle and on 22 March 1944 Bethlen was asked to leave. Disguised as a colonel in the Honved, Bethlen fled Budapest to a country house in Transylvania. On 25 June 1944, from his place in hiding, Bethlen wrote Horthy a long letter asking him to dismiss the prime minister, General Döme Sztójay and stop the deportation of Hungarian Jews to the Auschwitz death camp, which had started on 15 May 1944. Bethlen wrote he was against "the inhuman and stupid persecution of the Jews with which the present government had strained the Hungarian name...and threatened to corrupt once and for all large segments of gentile society". Bethlen ended his letter by asking Horthy to "chase away the present cabinet from its place", pull all Hungarian troops serving on the Eastern Front back to Hungary, appoint a new prime minister and a cabinet of technocrats, and sign a new armistice with the Allies (the government of Miklós Kállay had signed a secret armistice in 1943). In July 1944, Bethlen from his hiding place in Transylvania sent Horthy another letter saying that the best man to replace Sztójay with was General Géza Lakatos, writing that Lakatos was apolitical and obscure enough not to create suspicions in Berlin if he was appointed prime minister, but loyal enough to the regent to sign an armistice with the Allies, which Bethlen stated was urgently needed before Hungary was destroyed in the war.

On 23 August 1944, King Michael of Romania dismissed Ion Antonescu as prime minister of Romania, signed an armistice, and declared war on Germany and Hungary. Romania's defection from the Axis to the Allies undermined the entire German position in the Balkans, cut Germany off from its principal source of oil, and led for joint Soviet-Romanian forces to enter northern Transylvania, leading to intense fighting with the defending German and Hungarian forces. Bethlen returned to Budapest at once and on 25 August 1944 had a meeting with Horthy and Lakatos. With German forces being rushed into Hungary to defend the mountain passes high in the Carpathians in Transylvania, Bethlen advised Horthy not to sign an armistice, but rather to appoint Lakatos as prime minister with a secret mandate to prepare for an armistice, which would occur sometime in the fall of 1944 with the military situation might be more opportune. On 29 August, Horthy dismissed Sztójay as prime minister and appointed Lakatos as his successor. On 6 September 6 1944, Lakatos told Horthy that the Red Army had broken through the German-Hungarian lines in Transylvania and that Soviet and Romanian forces would soon be on the Great Hungarian Plain. Lakatos added that a decision about whatever to sign an armistice or not was immediately needed as there was no time left to waste. On 10 September 1944, Horthy called for an emergency meeting of the Crown Council to discuss the question of an armistice. Bethlen once again entered the Royal Castle via underground passage attended the meeting as an elder statesmen. Bethlen stated that fighting was already occurring on Hungarian soil and to continue the war would result in the destruction of Hungary, which led him to conclude that Hungary should sign an armistice at once before any more destruction occurred. The majority of the Honved generals who attended the Crown Council meeting spoke against an armistice, arguing that an armistice would probably led to a Communist government in Hungary and that it would be better to fight on as an ally of Nazi Germany even if it meant the complete destruction of Hungary than have a Communist regime in Budapest. The generals also added the absurd demand that Horthy inform Hitler in advance that he would sign an armistice, saying that it would be a violation of their honour as Hungarian offices and gentlemen to sign an armistice without informing their German allies first. The Crown Council meeting ended with Horthy deciding for an armistice, but also to inform Hitler in advance.

Even at this point, Horthy was against an armistice with the Soviet Union and believed if he signed an armistice only with the United States and the United Kingdom that it would be possible to have an Anglo-American instead of a Soviet occupation of Hungary. Horthy-who had a deep hatred of Communism-only reluctantly decided to sign an armistice with the Soviet Union on 22 September 1944 after being informed that it would not be possible for the Anglo-American forces currently fighting in Italy to reach Hungary anytime soon. After the armistice was signed, Horthy planned to appoint Bethlen prime minister again as the best man to deal with the extremely difficult situation that Hungary now faced. Many officials and officers were opposed to any armistice, especially an armistice with the Soviet Union, and kept SS-Brigadefuhrer, Edmund Veesenmayer, the German Minister Plenipotentiary in Budapest, well informed of the status of the Hungarian-Soviet armistice talks, which allowed Veesenmayer ample time to prepare a coup d'etat to depose Horthy and replace him with Ferenc Szálasi, the leader of the fascist Arrow Cross. On 15 October 1944, the Germans executed Operation Panzerfaust, which saw Horthy's son kidnapped by SS-Obersturmbannführer Otto Skorzeny, which forced Horthy to abdicate and appoint Szálasi as his successor. Under the Arrow Cross regime, Bethlen was forced to go into hiding as his name was on a death list of the enemies of the Arrow Cross to be executed.

By the spring of 1945, most of Hungary had fallen to the advancing Soviet troops. The communists, who returned with the Soviets, immediately began their scheme to take over the country. They saw the aging Bethlen as a threat, a man who could unite the political forces against them. That made the Soviets arrest him in March 1945. Soon afterward, Bethlen was taken to Moscow, where he died in prison on 5 October 1946.

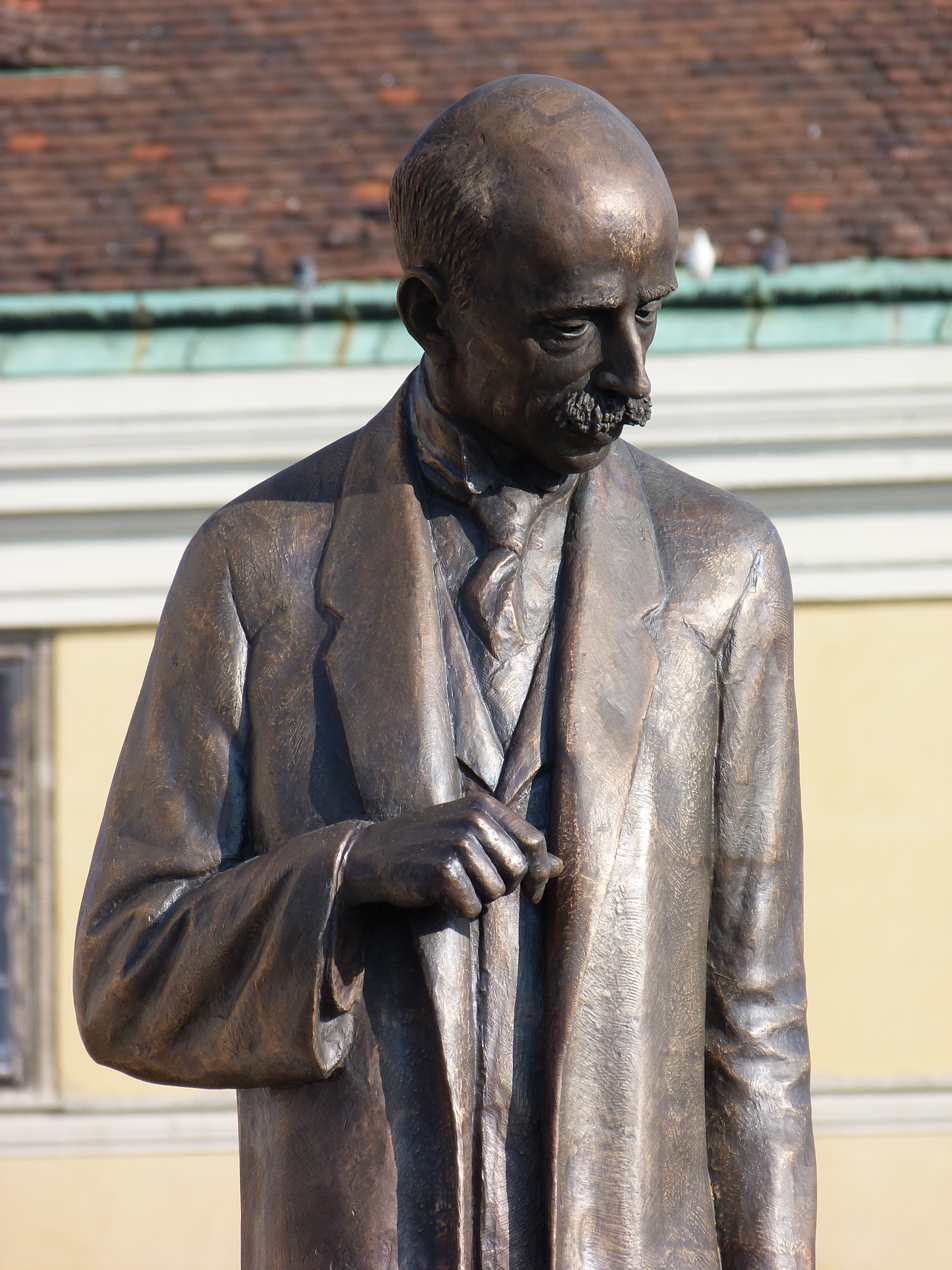
István Bethlen – Buda Castle

== Personal life ==
On 27 June 1901, he married his distant cousin, the author Countess Margarete Bethlen de Bethlen (1882–1970). They had 3 sons:

- Count András Bethlen de Bethlen (1902–1970) ⚭ Magda Viola (b.1901) ⚭ Eszter Mészáros (1892–1955) ⚭ Maria Palma 'Mizzi' Hoffmann (b.1906); no issue
- Count István Bethlen de Bethlen (1904–1982) ⚭ Donna Maria Isabella dei Conti Parravicini (1912–2008); had issue
- Count Gábor Bethlen de Bethlen (1906–1981) ⚭ Edith Schmidt (1909–1969); had issue

== Notes ==
Political offices
Preceded by Pál Teleki	Prime Minister of Hungary; 1921–1931	Succeeded by Gyula Károlyi
Preceded by Lajos Hegyeshalmi	Minister of Finance; Acting; 1921	Succeeded by Tibor Kállay
Preceded by Emil Nagy	Minister of Justice; Acting; 1924	Succeeded by Pál Pesthy
Preceded by Géza Daruváry	Minister of Foreign Affairs; Acting; 1924	Succeeded by Tibor Scitovszky
Preceded by István Szabó de Nagyatád	Minister of Agriculture; Acting; 1924	Succeeded by János Mayer
Preceded by Pál Pesthy	Minister of Justice; Acting; 1929	Succeeded by Tibor Zsitvay
