= Gyula Károlyi =

Hungarian politician

Count Gyula Károlyi de Nagykároly
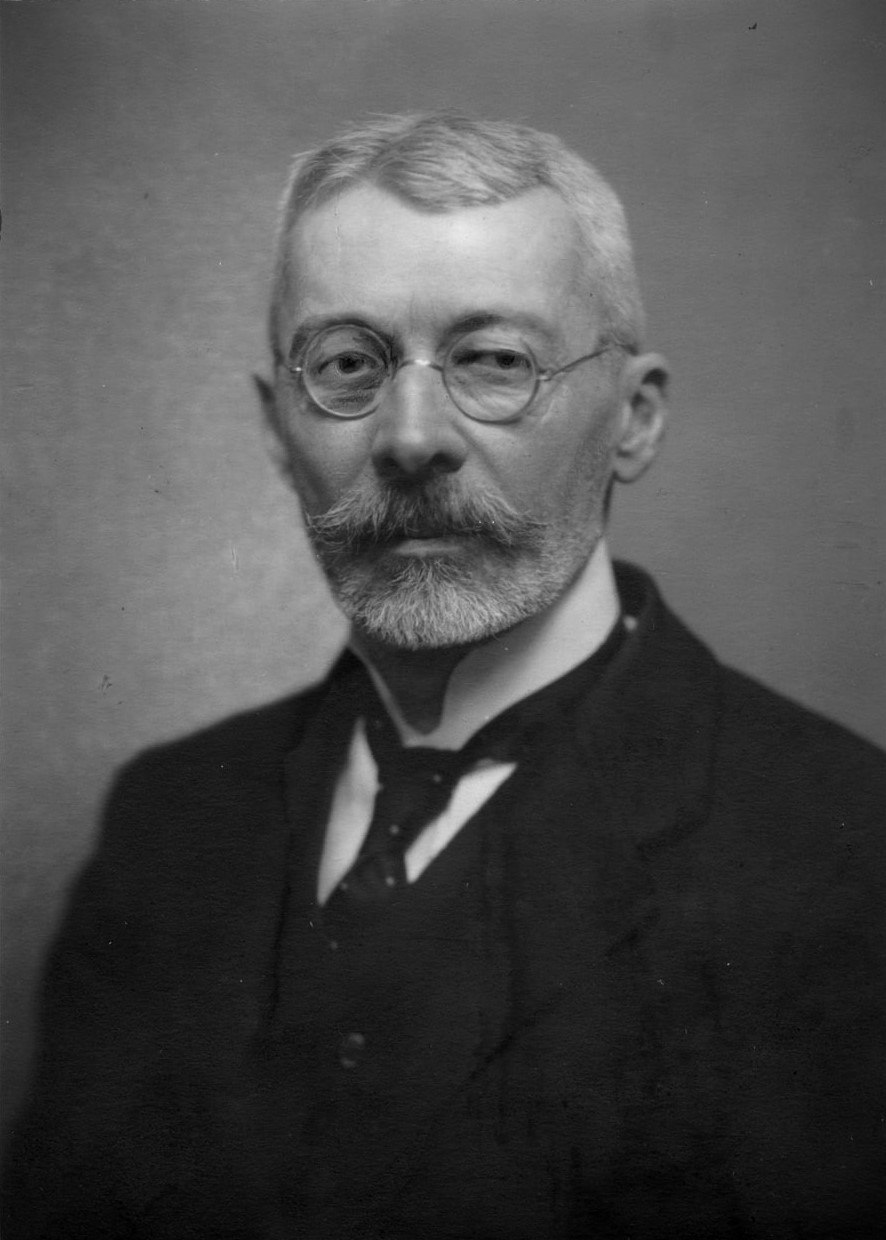
- Károlyi in 1930

Prime Minister of Hungary
- In office 24 August 1931 – 1 October 1932
- Regent: Miklós Horthy
- Preceded by: István Bethlen
- Succeeded by: Gyula Gömbös
- In office 5 May 1919 – 12 July 1919; In opposition to: Sándor Garbai
- Preceded by: Position established
- Succeeded by: Dezső Pattantyús-Ábrahám

Member of the House of Magnates
- In office 31 January 1927 – 28 March 1945

Personal details
- Born: 7 May 1871 Nyírbakta, Kingdom of Hungary, Austria-Hungary
- Died: 23 April 1947 (aged 75) Budapest, Second Hungarian Republic
- Party: Liberal Party, Unity Party
- Spouse: Melinda Károlyi
- Profession: politician

Count Gyula Károlyi de Nagykároly in English: Julius Károlyi (7 May 1871 – 23 April 1947) was a conservative Hungarian politician who served as Prime Minister of Hungary from 1931 to 1932. He had previously been prime minister of the counter-revolutionary government in Szeged for several months in 1919. As prime minister, he generally tried to continue the moderate conservative policies of his predecessor, István Bethlen, although with less success.

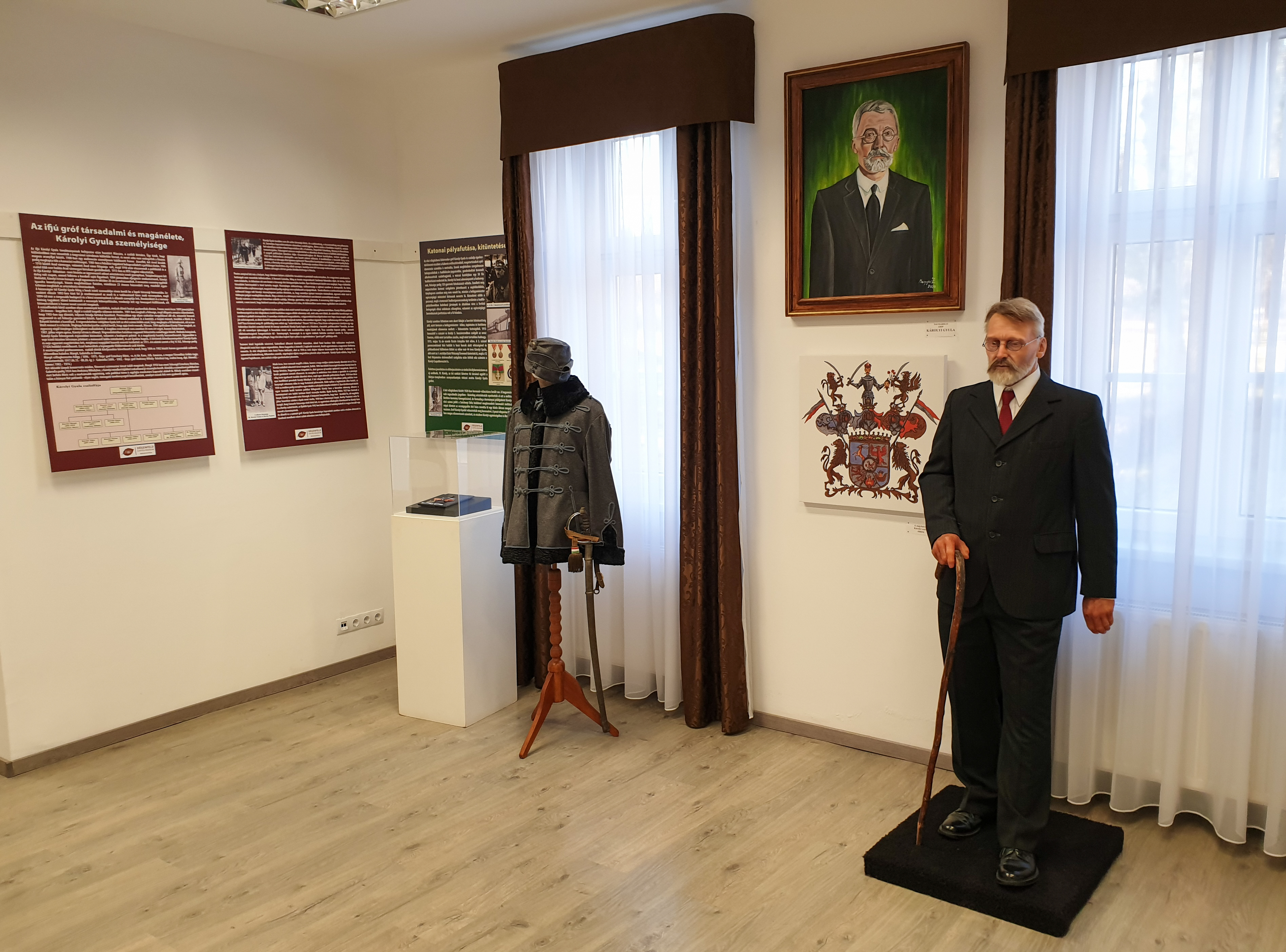
Wax statue of Gyula Károlyi at the Degenfeld mansion 01

== Early life ==
He was born in Nyírbakta (now: Baktalórántháza) to an old aristocratic family. His parents were Count Tibor Károlyi, who served as Speaker of the House of Magnates from 1898 to 1900, and Countess Emma Degenfeld-Schomburg. Tibor Károlyi was also the guardian of Gyula's first cousin, Mihály Károlyi, who would become first prime minister and then president of Hungary.

After grammar school studies he attended the Faculty of Law at the University of Budapest, followed by studies at the University of Berlin and the University of Bonn. After returning home, he joined Hungarian politics as a member of the House of Magnates. He served as the ispán of Arad County between 1906 and 1910. Following this he retired from politics and started farming on the huge family estate in Arad County. He became a member of the Hungarian Academy of Sciences in 1915.

== Counter-revolutionary Government ==
After World War I broke out, he volunteered and fought on the Eastern Front as a lieutenant of hussars. After the war he returned to his estate, but the country's situation was chaotic: his cousin, Mihály Károlyi led the Aster Revolution and the Austro-Hungarian Monarchy collapsed. The new leadership decreased the Hungarian Army's numbers to indicate their peaceful intentions towards the Entente Powers. The adjacent countries (Romania, and Czechoslovakia) took advantage of this to gain even more territory: the Romanians occupied Transylvania and the Partium in Spring 1919. On top of this, the Hungarian Soviet Republic was established on 21 March 1919.

Many significant Hungarian politicians emigrated to Vienna because of the revolution and the Red Terror. Organizing began with István Bethlen's movement for the liquidation of Bolshevik power, the Antibolshevik Committee. In parallel with this Gyula Károlyi formed a counter-revolutionary government in Arad. In May the Romanians occupied the town, interning Károlyi and many of his ministers. After his release, he went to Szeged, which was controlled by the French Army. Károlyi reorganized his government here with the goal of ending communist rule and on 12 July 1919 Dezső Pattantyús-Ábrahám became its prime minister. The two counter-revolutionary centers, Vienna and Szeged, harmonized their work in the interest of the common aims. Károlyi's Minister of War was Admiral Miklós Horthy, who set up the National Army; these two politicians began to be friends.

== Prime Minister of Hungary ==
Károlyi retired from politics for nearly ten years after 1919. After the Treaty of Trianon his family lost the estate in Arad County. Károlyi then farmed in Szabolcs County and Szatmár County. He became a member of the House of Magnates in 1927, and a Crown Guard in 1928. He undertook a bigger role in the politics during the Great Depression, becoming Minister of Foreign Affairs for a short time in the cabinet of István Bethlen, following Lajos Walko. In this capacity, Károlyi visited Benito Mussolini in Rome in March 1931. He had also made a controversial statement: "Emotions, reason, and the threads of interest bind Hungary to France", which brought him some notice in the French press.

István Bethlen resigned the prime ministership on 19 August 1931, because he did not want to bring in unpopular measures. Regent Miklós Horthy then appointed Károlyi to this post. The new cabinet was established on 24 August 1931, but the ministers did not change very much.

In Hungary the economic catastrophe presented itself as a protracted agrarian and credit crisis. Agricultural products comprised the larger part of the Hungarian exports, but these prices fell 50—70% on the world market. The peasants' situation became horrible, and industry and trade also suffered.

Károlyi reduced state expenses with large-scale economies. The Ministry of Finance reduced the pay of state employees: railwaymen, postmen, clerks, soldiers, gendarmes, members of the river forces, and customs workers. Social benefits and pensions were reduced. This, however, was not a solution to these serious economic problems; it helped only slightly that Károlyi forbade all ministers to use state cars: he as prime minister commuted from his apartment in Pest to Buda Castle.

When Szilveszter Matuska blew up a portion of the Biatorbágy bridge near Budapest on 13 September 1931, causing the engine and nine of the eleven coaches of the Vienna Express to plunge into a ravine 30 meters deep, Gyula Károlyi issued two orders imposing martial law. He made use of this tragedy to imprison Communists and to ban all political rallies and processions. Imre Sallai and Sándor Fürst, leaders of the Communist movement, were arrested and executed in 1932 after a show trial. These emergency measures did not improve the situation: there had been no real threat of a mass movement.

This unrelieved crisis deepened discontent in Hungarian society, even among the political elite. The opposition demanded extension of the franchise, introduction of primary elections and the secret ballot, and more effective protection of wage earners, while the agrarian lobby demanded extension of markets and protection of farmers. These groups turned against the Prime Minister when they saw no actual results, and these failures led Bethlen to call for Károlyi's resignation in September 1932. Károlyi gladly followed this advice, as he had been hesitant from the first to be prime minister. He resigned on 21 September 1932, returning to his lands, and was succeeded by Gyula Gömbös.

== Later life ==
After his prime ministership, he retired from active politics. He was a member of Horthy's inner advisory council, and became a secret advisor in 1936. He protested against all forms of anti-Semitism throughout his political career. He resigned from all his posts and even his membership of the upper house of parliament in 1939, in protest against the second Jewish law.

He also sharply criticised the German orientation of Hungarian politics. During the Second World War he supported the policies of Miklós Kállay. Károlyi died in Budapest at the age of 75.

Political offices
Preceded by —	Prime Minister of the Counter-Government of Hungary; 1919	Succeeded by Dezső Pattantyús-Ábrahám
Preceded by Lajos Walko	Minister of Foreign Affairs; 1930–1931	Succeeded by Lajos Walko
Preceded by István Bethlen	Prime Minister of Hungary; 1931–1932	Succeeded by Gyula Gömbös
Preceded by Sándor Wekerle Jr.	Minister of Finance; Acting; 1931	Succeeded by Frigyes Korányi
