= Murga, Hungary =

Murga
- Location of Tolna county in Hungary

- Location of Murga, Hungary
- Coordinates: 46.46139°N 18.48772°E
- Country: Hungary
- County: Tolna

Area
  - Total: 6.58 km^{2} (2.54 sq mi)

Population (2004)
  - Total: 80
  - Density: 12.15/km^{2} (31.5/sq mi)
- Time zone: UTC+1 (CET)
  - Summer (DST): UTC+2 (CEST)
- Postal code: 7176
- Area code: 74

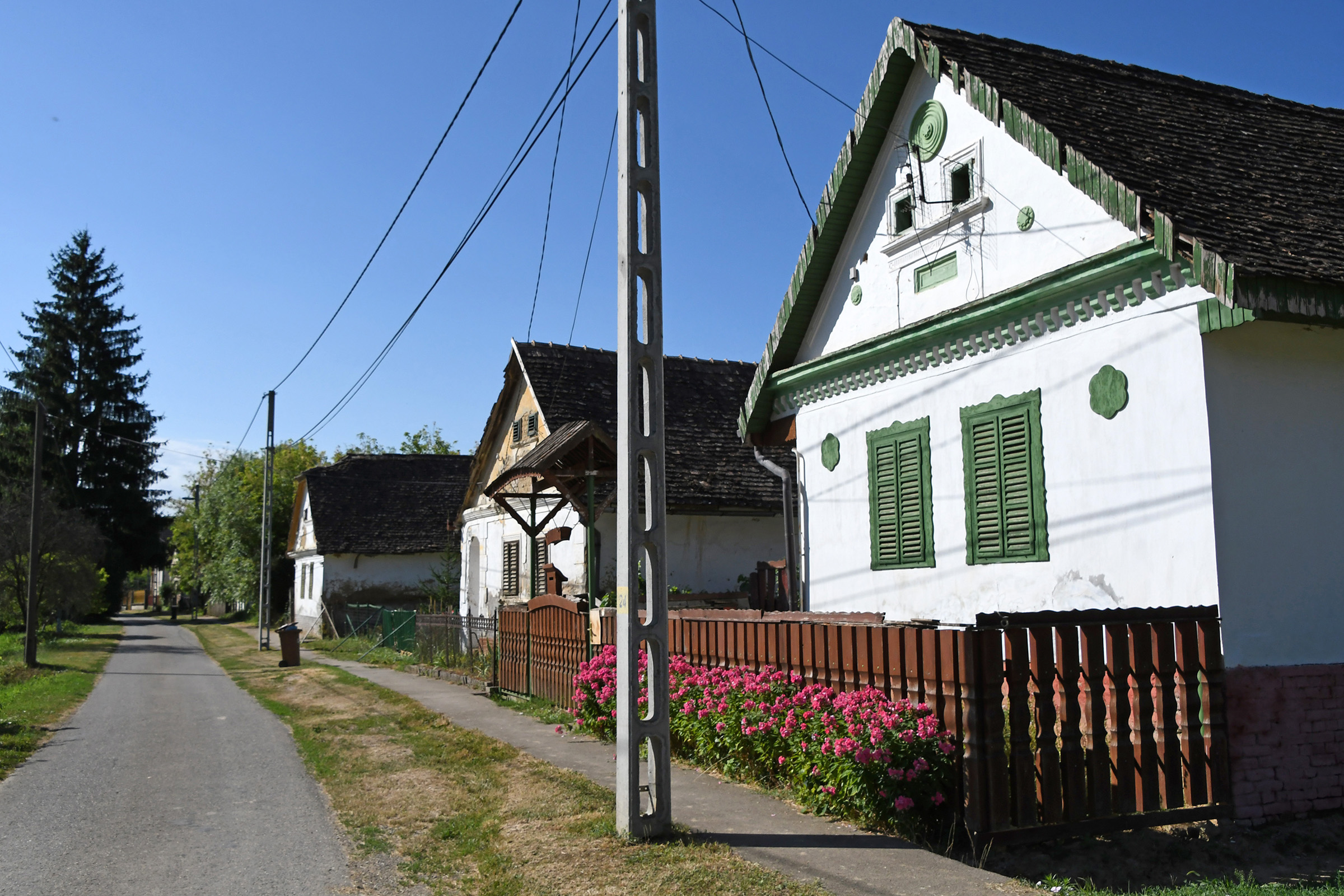
Street of Murga, Hungary

Murga is a village in Tolna County, Hungary.
