= György Barcza =

Hungarian diplomat

- György Barcza in 1927, photographed by Strelisky fiókja.

Personal details
- Born: 2 July 1888 Pusztazámor, Hungary
- Died: 18 April 1961 (aged 72) Australia

György Barcza (2 July 1888 – 18 April 1961) was a Hungarian diplomat, best remembered as serving as the Hungarian minister-plenipotentiary to the United Kingdom between 1938 and 1941.

== Entry into diplomacy ==
Barcza was born into an aristocratic, wealthy Roman Catholic family in Pusztazámor. After having obtained a degree in the law from University of Budapest, he went to study at the Diplomatic Academy of Vienna. The Hungarian historians' Anita Faust and Viktória Németh wrote: "His personal traits proved to be more important for building relationships and moving up the ranks than his family background, i.e. aristocratic descent. This phenomenon coincides with the trend described by Somogyi and Godsey, that is, the professionalisation of the organisation came to the fore, as opposed to gentility. Coming from a middle noble family in Transdanubia, György Barcza himself was not part of the aristocratic elite but did have kinship ties to it. He built his diplomat career on professionalism, rather than his own social status". He supported the existing political system established by the Compromise of 1867, feeling that Eastern Europe was dominated by three great empires, namely the German, Russian and Austrian empires, and membership in the latter allowed the Hungarians a degree of influence and power in world affairs that they would not have if Hungary were independent.

In 1911, he paid an extended visit to Scandinavia, going as far north as the Barents Sea, which was recounted in his book Útijegyzetek: egy jegestengeri vadászkirándulásról. He especially wanted to see the Barents Sea because the Austro-Hungarian North Pole expedition of 1872–1874 had discovered Franz Josef Land, which was named after the King-Emperor Franz Josef. For him, the polar expedition that found Franz Josef Land was a symbol of what Austria-Hungary could achieve as the crews of the ships were made of peoples from all over the vast Austrian empire. On 12 November 1912, he married Baroness Alexa Jeszenszky in Budapest. The couple had three children, two daughters Alexandra Barcza and Erzsébet Barcza, and a son Péter Barcza.

== World War One ==
In 1914, he began his diplomatic career with a posting at the Austro-Hungarian embassy in Athens. In 1916, he was posted at the Austro-Hungarian embassy in Copenhagen. Denmark was a neutral state in World War One, and served as a place for smuggling raw materials from overseas into the Central Powers along with being a center of espionage. Barcza insisted that as a diplomat, he played no role in the murky business of espionage, saying that was the responsibility of others at the Austro-Hungarian embassy. Denmark also served as the protecting power for Austria-Hungary in Russia and as the Russians had taken a substantial number of Hungarians prisoner during the campaigns in Galicia, Barcza was constantly involved in negotiations with the Danish Red Cross concerning the status of Hungarian POWs in Russia. During his time in Copenhagen, Barcza ensured the return of 15, 000 sick Hungarian POWs to Hungary in exchange for the release of the same number of sick Russian POWs. Because the Austrian empire together with Prussia had committed aggression against Denmark during the war of 1864, most Danes were pro-Allied in their views of the war, and Barcza found himself on the defensive in Denmark.

Barcza recalled about his time in Denmark: "Morally and politically, the Central Powers-and Germany in particular-caused themselves immense harm. Since in their trade, Scandinavian countries rely practically entirely on transportation by sea, unlimited submarine warfare was having a severely negative impact upon their economy...We have not opted for neutrality only to suffer for this, they said. When will this war that is causing hardships for the innocent finally end? The unpopularity of Germans, which until then, had been only political transformed into a general hatred and anger". He described the propaganda carried out by the Austro-Hungarian embassy as ineffective with the main emphasis being on the modernity of the Austrian empire, which did not address the anger caused by the use of unrestricted submarine warfare by Germany. The collapse of the Austrian Empire in October 1918 left Barcza in a difficult position as he found himself representing the newly independent Hungary without any budget. Barcza wrote in his memoirs: "I was fine with the Danish government, I was there in Copenhagen as the envoy of Hungary, but I had no office, no secretary, no errand boy, and – last but not least – no official budget. So, I had to create an embassy out of thin air...This is how the first Hungarian embassy was established in the Scandinavian states."

Because the existence of Hungary was only considered provisional, Barcza held the title only as envoy instead of ambassador. Barcza was appointed Hungarian envoy to all the four Scandinavian states, not just Denmark, and he relocated to Stockholm, the capital of Sweden, the most populous and richest of the Scandinavian states. The image of the newly established Hungarian People's Republic in Sweden was hostile with the perception being the liberal Count Mihály Károlyi was an impractical idealist who was far too soft on the political left. The country that welcomed Barcza the most was the newly independent Finland on the account of the discovery that the Magyar and Finnish languages belonged to the same Finno-Ugric linguistic family with origins deep in Asia. Barcza recalled that during his visits to Finland: "Wherever I went, the Finns welcomed me most cordially, even celebrated me, as a representative of a nation related to them. At times I felt as a rich and aristocratic relative visiting the poorer." Finland was by far the most anti-Communist of the four Scandinavian states on the account of the attempts of Soviet Russia to export its revolution into Finland, which led to a brief, but bloody civil war in Finland between Finnish Communists vs. Finnish anti-communists. Barcza reported that the Finns were very hostile to the Hungarian Soviet Republic and regarded Admiral Miklós Horthy as playing a role analogous in Hungary to what Field Marshal Carl Gustaf Emil Mannerheim had played in Finland. Most of Barcza's time was spent trying to mobilise sympathy for Hungary against projected territorial losses to Yugoslavia, Romania and Czechoslovakia. After the Treaty of Trianon was signed, Barcza lobbied hard for Scandinavian support for Hungarian revanchism against the Treaty of Trianon. In 1922, he returned to Budapest.

== Between the wars ==
From 1925 to 1927, Barcza served as the chief the political department of the Ministry of Foreign Affairs, whose subordinates included the future prime minister László Bárdossy. Barcza came from a more prominent and wealthier aristocratic family than Bárdossy and had a "grand seigneur" attitude towards his social inferiors, which led to embittered relations between the two men. In World War Two, the relationship between Barcza and Bárdossy was to be reversed with Barcza serving as the Hungarian minister-plenipotentiary in London and Bárdossy serving as foreign minister and prime minister. Barcza was close to the prime minister István Bethlen whose conservative politics he largely shared. From 1927 to 1938, Barcza served as the Hungarian ambassador to the Vatican in Rome. A devout Roman Catholic, Barcza greatly admired Pope Pope Pius XI.

From 25 May 1938 to 7 April 1941, Barcza served as the Hungarian minister plenipotentiary in London. A noted Anglophile, Barcza very much enjoyed his posting in London. The Hungarian historian Andreas Bán described Barcza as typical of the older Hungarian diplomats trained at the Diplomatic Academy of Vienna who subscribed to "a high-minded conservatism" that rejected both extremism of the left and the right while being deeply Anglophile. Like other foreign diplomats in London, Barcza noted that the professional diplomats of the Foreign Office experienced a nadir in terms of influence on policy during the prime ministership of Neville Chamberlain. Barcza reported to Budapest that British politics were dominated by an "Inner Circle" that consisted of Chamberlain, the Foreign Secretary Lord Halifax, the Home Secretary Samuel Hoare, the Chancellor of the Exchequer Sir John Simon, and the Chief Industrial Adviser to Chamberlain, Horace Wilson. Barcza stated that decisions were made by the "Inner Circle" during private meetings and that the Cabinet largely served to rubberstamp what had already been decided by the "Inner Circle". During the Sudetenland crisis of 1938, Barcza's chief role was to lobby the Chamberlain cabinet to champion the Hungarian territorial claims against Czechoslovakia, arguing that if the Sudetenland region should go to Germany, then logically the Hungarians should be allowed to annex all the regions of Czechoslovakia that they claimed. As such, Barcza's chief rival in London was Jan Masaryk, the Czechoslovak minister plenipotentiary in London whose task was to champion his nation's cause. On 30 August 1938, Barcza reported that the British "understood" the reasons for the expansion of German-Hungarian trade and regarded as natural and normal that Hungary should fall into the German economic sphere of influence. Reflecting his understanding of the power of the "Inner Circle", Barcza largely by-passed the Foreign Office and instead met personally with Lord Halifax, where he emphasised that Hungary was committed to peacefully revising the Treaty of Trianon and that Halifax should consider Hungary's territorial claims against Czechoslovakia. Via Andrian Dingli, an Italian diplomat in London who was a friend of Chamberlain, Barcza sent the prime minister a lengthy memo stating out Hungary's case against Czechoslovkia.

At the Bad Godesberg summit, Adolf Hitler rejected the Anglo-French plan for turning over the Sudetenland as insufficient, which pushed the world to the brink of a world war. After the Bad Godesberg summit, Lord Halifax summoned Barcza to a meeting, where he warned Hungary against attacking Czechoslovakia, saying that if an invasion of Czechoslovakia would lead to an automatic British declaration of war on Hungary. About the problems of the Maygar minority in Czechoslovakia, Halifax told Barcza that Hungary should try to have the League of Nations serve as a mediator. Halifax stated he was not willing to support "adjustments" in the Hungarian-Czechoslovak frontier, but suggested that the League of Nations might be able to mediate some sort of frontier "adjustments" that might settle the Hungarian-Czechoslovak dispute. Barcza was deeply disappointed by Halifax's attitude, charging that Britain was willing to support Germany's demand for the Sudeten Germans to "go home to the Reich" because Germany was rich and powerful while unwilling to do anything for Maygars living in Czechoslovakia because Hungary was poor and weak. He complained that the League of Nations was useless, and that only great power pressure like the sort that was applied on the Czechoslovak president Edvard Beneš on the behalf of the Sudeten Germans would work. Under the Munich Agreement of 30 September 1938, which ended the crisis, the Hungarian-Czechoslovak dispute was to be resolved later.

When Chamberlain returned from Munich to land at Heston Aerodrome to announce he had secured "peace for our time" while waving about a copy of the Anglo-German declaration he and Hitler had signed that morning, Barcza was one of the diplomats present to congratulate Chamberlain. He remembered that Chamberlain was considered to be the man of hour and all of London seemed to rejoy that war had been averted, writing: "Everyone warmly congratulated Chamberlain. I too stepped over; Lord Halifax identified me, and old Chamberlain accepted my good wishes with a beaming face. 'The preservation of peace is exceeding important from Hungary's point of view too' I said to Chamberlain, 'because all that we seek, at all times, is peace, peaceful work, and international concord'. Many thousands of cars and the throng of hundreds of thousands hurried back to London along the Great Western Road, and that evening all London celebrated in happy relief with every public house crammed to bursting and champagne flowing like water; people really did believe that peace had been secured for the foreseeable future". Against later attempts to depict the initial popularity of the Munich Agreement as due to collective cowardice and moral decay, Barcza stated that most people in Britain in 1938 were just happy that a devastating world war where millions of people would die had been averted and that was the reason for the popularity of the Munich Agreement.

On 4 October 1938, Barcza reported to Budapest that the Munich Agreement was very popular, but stated a minority considered the agreement to be "nothing less than a defeat concealed in the attractive wrapping of peace". He accused many of the Foreign Office top officials of being Francophiles (a term of abuse in Hungary as France had signed alliances with Czechoslovakia, Romania and Yugoslavia), and suggested the resignations of Anthony Eden as Foreign Secretary in February followed by Alfred Duff Cooper as First Lord of the Admiralty in October indicated that a significant faction of the Conservative Party was opposed to appeasement. Barcza reported to Budapest that the Foreign Office seemed relieved that the Hungarian-Czechoslovak dispute was to be mediated by Germany and Italy with no British involvement. Barcza wrote "...we would be deluding ourselves to expect anymore from Britain, that is to say forceful intervention and pressure on anything like the scale that was exerted in the interests of easing German-Czech tensions". Under the First Vienna Award, Hungary received some, but no all of the disputed land. In January 1939, Barcza was recalled to Budapest to be interviewed by the prime minister, Béla Imrédy, about the "lost opportunity" of September 1938. Under the influence of his hawkish defense minister Károly Bartha and the even more hawkish the chief of staff Henrik Werth, Imrédy had become convinced that Hungary should had attacked Czechoslovakia in September 1938. Imrédy blamed Barcza for having promising the British that Hungary would had been neutral if Germany invaded Czechoslovakia. Barcza responded by saying "that’s not true. I am far too experienced diplomat, having studied at the higher levels of Ballplatz schooling, to make such a major declaration without instructions". He stated that all he had done in London was follow the orders given to him by the Foreign Minister Kálmán Kánya and questions of war and peace were matters for the Hungarian cabinet to decide, telling Imrédy that his only duties as Hungarian minister plenipotentiary the court of St. James were to report to the government in Budapest what was happening in the United Kingdom and to represent Hungarian interests in Great Britain.

Starting in late 1938-early 1939, British policy towards Germany moved into a more confrontational stance, which led to interest in preventing Hungary from falling into German sphere of influence. In February 1939, both Sir Alexander Cadogan, the Foreign Office permanent undersecretary, and Foreign Office undersecretary Rab Butler told Barcza that Britain supporting Hungary annexing the Carpatho-Ukraine region as Ruthernia had been renamed along with the creation of a common Polish-Hungarian frontier. In February 1939, Barcza's friend, Pál Teleki became prime minister. Teleki did not trust his pro-German foreign minister, Count István Csáky, and usually communicated directly to Barcza. Barcza had long complained to Chamberlain that the British minister plenipotentiary in Budapest, Geoffrey Knox, was hostile towards Hungary and he wanted a new minister plenipotentiary. In an effort to improve Anglo-Hungarian relations, Chamberlain sacked Knox and replaced him with Sir Owen O'Malley. At the same time, Barcza had reported to Budapest that the openly anti-Semitic and pro-Nazi policies being pursued by the prime minister Béla Imrédy had damaged Hungary's image in Britain, especially in the City and it would being more difficult for Hungary to obtain British loans. On 15 March 1939, Germany occupied the Czech half of Czecho-Slovakia, creating the Protectorate of Bohemia and Moravia. At the same time, the Hungarians invaded Slovakia while annexing Carpatho-Ukraine. Cadogan told Barcza that he welcomed the Hungarian annexation of Carpatho-Ukraine, saying it was better that the Hungarians should annex it rather than the Germans. During the height of the Danzig crisis, Barcza first met Winston Churchill at the estate of Lord Londonderry in the countryside of Northern Ireland in July 1939. Barcza came to be a friend of Churchill's, whom he described as being sympathetic towards Hungarian demands for the revision of the Treaty of Trianon, which Churchill felt to be too harsh towards Hungary. Barcza also reported that Churchill believed that the Europe was soon to be divided into power blocs, the Axis and the Allies, and he would have no empathy for any state that chose to be aligned with the Axis states, whose leaders Churchill called "political gangsters".

== World War Two ==
On September 1 1939, the Danzig crisis escalated into war with Germany invading Poland, which led to Anglo-French declarations of war on Germany on 3 September 1939. Barcza reported that the policies of the Hungarian prime minister Pál Teleki in refusing to join the invasion of Poland, denying the Germans transit rights to invade Poland via Hungary and his welcoming of Polish refugees and retreating Polish soldiers had won Hungary many admirers in Britain. During the Phoney War in the winter of 1939–1940, Teleki tried to limit the extent of economic co-operation with Germany. On 9 February 1940, Barcza submitted a note to the Foreign Office, saying Hungary would defend its independence against any state that attacked her or made demands that not in accordance with "Hungarian honour". In return, Barcza wanted British support for Hungary taking back Transylvania from Romania, saying that Hungary deserved a reward for limiting economic co-operation with the Reich. Sir Orme Sargent, the deputy under-secretary of the Foreign Office, dismissed Barcza'a appeal out of hand, writing in a memo "since Hungary can render us no service in the war, it is not worth our while to make any sacrifices on her behalf".

In May 1940, Barcza was involved in plans to set up a Hungarian government-in-exile in case Germany should invade Hungary. On 14 May 1940, Sargent told Barcza that if German soldiers should enter without Hungarian permission, then the British would treat Hungary the same way as Denmark, namely as an occupied nation. On 17 May 1940, Cadogan informed Barcza that the British would continue to maintain diplomatic relations with any Hungarian government-in-exile. In late 1940, the plans for a government-in-exile were revived. The prime minister of the proposed government-in-exile in London was to be Bethlen while Barcza would serve as foreign minister. At the time, Cadogan told Barcza that "His Majesty's Government would be honored and pleased and would recognise them as a Government". The plans fell through when the prime minister Pál Teleki abandoned the plan for a government-in-exile and instead signed the Tripartite Pact and gave the Germans transit rights to enter Romania. After Hungary signed the Tripartite Pact on 20 November 1940, Barcza reported that Cadogan had told him: "Finally, he declared that present political contingencies would not have an undue influence on traditional Anglo-Hungarian sympathies, and he placed great weight on a continuation of our diplomatic relations". On the same day, the Anglo-Hungarian Society dissolved itself with the society's president, Sir Thomas Hohler, writing to Barcza: "Under the circumstances, nothing remains but to dissolve the Anglo-Hungarian Society, which I shall proceed to at once, though with the greatest reluctance and heavy heart". On 22 November 1940, Barcza reported that most of the British newspapers were not especially hostile towards Hungary's accession to the Tripartite Pact, reporting that The Times, the Daily Telegraph, the Manchester Guardian, and the Daily Herald were relatively neutral in their coverage with only the traditionally pro-Hungarian Daily Mail condemning Hungary for having "put her money on the wrong horse" just as it had done in the July crisis of 1914.

On 12 December 1940, the Treaty of Eternal Friendship between Hungary and Yugoslavia was signed in Belgrade. Barcza reported to Budapest that Cadogan had informed him: "The British government can only welcome any rapprochement, arrived at out of free will, which is aimed at the preservation of genuine peace. It may be that the Germans are hoping that, having failed to drive a single one of the independent Balkans states into the Axis, they can perhaps obtain Yugoslavia’s adherence in this manner, but he believed that British victory in Greece, the Mediterranean and now Africa, on the one hand, and Russian opposition to German expansion in the Balkans, on the other, formed a counterweight that would frustrate the German government's further plans". On 18 December 1940, Barcza confronted Cadogan over an article in The Times where the president of the Czechoslovak government-in-exile Edvard Beneš was quoted as saying that Britain supported his plans to restore Czechoslovakia back to its pre-1938 frontiers, which would mean that all of the Czechoslovak territory the Hungarians had annexed in 1938-1939 would have to be returned. Cadogan stated that Beneš was wrong, and that Britain had no fixed policy on the future frontiers of Czechoslovakia, which would be decided at a peace conference after the war. The Foreign Secretary Anthony Eden told Barcza in December 1940 that he knew that Hungary was a weak state in a "difficult geopolitical situation", but that noted that Hungary had signed the Tripartitie Pact, was allowing Germany transit rights to send forces into Romania and the Hungarian media had a marked pro-Axis tone. Eden told Barcza that Britain did not recognise either the First Vienna Award or the Second Vienna Award. Barcza told Cadogan that was greatly saddened that Hungary had signed the Tripartite Pact, saying it was not his choice that Hungary had signed the pact and strongly hinted that if were foreign minister, Hungary would not have signed the Tripartite Pact.

In December 1940, Barcza returned to Hungary to celebrate Christmas in Budapest. Teleki was in deep despair as he told Barcza at a Christmas party: "We have to go with the Germans, nothing else is possible, but only to a certain point. And that point is taking part in the war. On no account will we do that...But it's unbelievably difficult, maybe impossible to oppose it. Revision, and I'd only say this to you, is the greatest danger that threatens but I cannot do anything against it, because I would be finished. The public has gone crazy. They want everything back! No matter how and no matter at what price...I'll struggle as long as I can hold out...I'll defend our honor, I won't give up the nation and the country, but if I cannot succeed I will shoot myself in the head". In January 1941, after his return to London, Eden informed Barcza that Britain not accept the Hungarian annexation of Ruthenia as the Hungarians called the Carpatho-Ukraine. At another meeting in January 1941, Barcza told Eden that Horthy was personally pro-British, but that the Germans had done far more to return some of the Lands of the Crown of St. Istvan to Hungary, which explained the pro-German neutrality that the Hungarians were now pursuing.

In February 1941 Barcza's former subordinate László Bárdossy became foreign minister. Barcza had a dysfunctional working relationship with Bárdossy, characterised by much mutual dislike and distrust, made worse by the fact that Bárdossy was an Anglophobe while Barcza was an Anglophile. Bárdossy tended to interpret British foreign policy in the worse possible light and when the subject of Britain came out always took an arrogant, sneering tone full of contempt and malice towards the British that Barcza much deplored. On 2 April 1941, Barcza sent a cable to Bárdossy, which in turn was passed on Teleki. Barcza reported that he had just spoken with Prime Minister Winston Churchill and the Foreign Secretary Anthony Eden, who were both furious that Hungary had granted Germany transit rights and that Wehrmacht divisions had already entered Hungary in preparation to invade Yugoslavia. Barcza stated that the British were going to break diplomatic relations with Hungary over the granting of transit rights and might even declare war. Barcza's cable caused Teleki much stress and helped to contribute to his suicide. On 3 April, Teleki shot himself in his office. Horthy in a meeting with Sir Owen O'Malley, the British minister plenipotentiary in Budapest, showed him Teleki's suicide note. Horthy blamed Barcza for Teleki's suicide, saying that his cable from London saying that "someone in authority" had told him that Hungary was dishonoring its name by giving Germany transit rights, was the reason for why Teleki had shot himself. On 5 April, Barcza reported that Sir Alexander Cadogan had arrived at the Hungarian Legation to offer his condolences for Teleki's suicide. Barcza added that Cadogan had once again repeated if the Germany invaded Yugoslavia, it would automatically became a British ally, and that because Hungary had granted Germany transit rights, it would also become a British enemy. Barcza sent a second cable to Bárdossy, who was now serving as prime minister, to allow him to serve as the minister plenipotentiary in Dublin in order to maintain links with the British if diplomatic relations were broken. The plan fell through when the Irish refused to allow Barcza to serve in Dublin. On 6 April 1941, Germany invaded Yugoslavia with Wehrmacht units crossing into Yugoslavia from Hungary while the Luftwaffe bombers that destroyed Belgrade had taken off from air fields in Hungary. O'Malley was ordered by Cadogan to break off diplomatic relations and to prepare to leave Budapest as soon as possible. In response to Luftwaffe raids on Yugoslavia from Hungarian air fields, the Royal Yugoslav Air Force bombed the Hungarian cites of Szeged and Pécs. A popular rumor in Hungary had it that the British had bombed Szeged and Pécs. On 7 April, Bárdossy wrote a note of protest against the alleged British bombing raids in strong language, which he ordered Barcza to give to Churchill personally. Barcza wrote back that the British had already broken diplomatic relations with Hungary and it was not possible for him to see Churchill anymore.

After Britain broke diplomatic relations, Barcza returned to Hungary. He was disillusioned with the Regent, Admiral Miklós Horthy, as he wrote in his diary: "The regent, surrounded by inexperienced but all the more ambitious politicians who flattered him, found himself in an atmosphere that plunged him into an artificially constructed, nonexistent fake world". Barcza was opposed to the Hungarian declaration of war on the Soviet Union in June 1941. Barcza wrote about the bombing of Kassa that the Hungarian newspapers had taken this "unresolved incident inflating it into a Soviet attack" in order to bring Hungary into the war. Barcza cynically wrote about the government's reaction to the bombing: "If a government wants war at any cost, there is always a pretext to justify it, or it is easy to conjure one up, and if it does not want it, then there are extremely many logical and honorable possibilities of avoiding this in good faith". Britain nominated the United States to serve as the protecting power and as such, Herbert Pell, the American minister-plenipotentiary in Budapest, represented British interests in Hungary. On 12 December 1941 Barcza wrote in his diary: "Pell said yesterday evening he had been with Bárdossy, who visibly agitated, had informed him Hungary was breaking off relations with America. Pell, who is a good friend of ours, told me that he had tried to feed Bárdossy, as an explanation for the communiquė, the suggestion being that under foreign pressure, the Hungarian government had no option, but Bárdossy had interrupted him and replied in a raised voice there was no question of foreign pressure. The government was breaking off diplomatic relations with the United States independently of the others, of its own free will. Pell tried again to make an impression on Bárdossy, as he would have liked to contrive that when he presented himself to report, he could tell Roosevelt something in favor of Hungary along the lines that having been placed under terrible German pressure and duress, we were compelled to break relations with the USA. But Bárdossy did not want to take Pell's well intentioned hint and stuck by his assertion that there was no question of foreign influence on us; the step had been decided by the government and that was all there was to it".

In the fall of 1942, Bethlen contacted Barcza to ask him to use his connections with the British elite in order to sign an armistice with the Allies. In February 1943, Barcza had dinner with the prime minister Miklós Kállay to discuss the peace mission. Barcza described Kállay as fearful that Hitler might find out about the peace mission and occupy Hungary. Barcza complained that maintaining secrecy in Hungary was hopeless as most Hungarians were too gossipy as even his barber knew about the peace mission. Barcza left Budapest for Rome on his peace mission on 22 March 1943. In Rome, Barca met with Pope Pius XII and D'Arcy Osborne, the British ambassador to the Holy See. Osborne assured Barcza that he pass on his message to the Foreign Office as soon as he returned to London, which happened to be very soon. During his audience with the Pope, Barza recalled "...after the usual ceremony, three genuflections, etc, he hugged me. Noticed immediately how much had had aged since I had last seen him-thinner, more pale, looked tired, eyes and mouth had melancholy lines". Pius told Barcza that he was a Magyarophile, saying that he was greatly impressed by what he had seen at the World Eucharistic Congress held in Budapest in 1938. Pius accepted the Hungarian self-image of themselves as being an especially chivalrous, romantic people whose moral code was governed by traditional Christian values.

Barcza found himself disappointed by the Pope, who lamented that there was so suffering and pain in the world at present, but kept making excuses as for his silence as Pius maintained he was powerless and that all he could do was pray. Barcza responded by saying that the Catholic Church had immense moral prestige, which was not being used enough as the Pope refused to say anything about the Holocaust. Pius in turn stated that he had appealed many times to Hitler to stop, but all his appeals were in vain. The Pope told Barcza that he had seriously considered excommunication as most of the Nazi leaders such as Hitler, Goebbels, Himmler and Göring were at least nominally Catholic, but he was afraid that it would only make matters worse. The Germanophile Pope told Barcza that he would very much afraid that Hitler would treat the 30 million or so German Catholics the same way he treated Polish Catholics, and for this reason he felt that he could do nothing. Barcza told Pius in response that it was regrettable that he should be more concerned with what Hitler might do to German Catholics instead of what he was actually doing to Polish Catholics, which seemed to suggest that German lives were more worth more than Polish lives. Barcza added that it was not a question of German Catholics or Polish Catholics, but rather of all Catholics around the world who were awaiting for the Pope to show moral leadership and courage, and that he was frankly disappointed by Pius's constant excuses as to why he could do nothing. Afterwards, Barcza found himself surprised at his own "audacity" in so openly criticising the Pope to his face. Barcza felt that Pius's was a well meaning, but basically weak man who was too afraid of Hitler to speak out and believed if Pius XII's predecessor Pope Pius XI were still alive that he would had spoken out against the Holocaust forcefully.

In April 1943, Barcza was sent by Kállay to go to Switzerland to contact British and American diplomats about signing an armistice. Barcza undertook the mission, but in his memoirs lambasted Kállay for having a lackadaisical attitude about signing an armistice, saying Kállay seemed to regard signing an armistice as something that was not especially urgent. In Bern, Barcza contacted Frederick Vanden Heuvel, the British press attache at the British embassy who turned out to be the MI6 station chief for Switzerland. At the American embassy, Barcza contacted Allen Dulles, the Office of Strategic Services station chief for Switzerland. Vanden Heuvel told Barcza that the British attitude towards Hungary and its demands to take back the lands lost under the Treaty of Trianon depended entirely upon what the Hungarians could do for the Allied war effort, saying that there was very little to no sabotage going on at present against the Axis war effort in Hungary. Vanden Heuvel stated that as long as the Hungary continued to be an active member of the Axis, then the British were going to be unsympathetic and after the war would restore the frontiers created by the Treaty of Trianon. Barcza in response stated that everyone in Hungary was too afraid of the power of the Reich to wage the sort of widespread sabotage campaign that Vanden Heuvel wanted. His concerns about the lack secrecy in Hungary would compromise his peace mission were well founded. At the first Schloss Klessheim conference held between 17-April 1943 that was attended by Horthy and Kállay, Hitler complained at length about Barcza's peace mission, saying that he knew very well that Barcza had gone to Rome in March with the aim of signing an armistice with the Allies.

Barcza recalled in March 1944 just before the German occupation that "never was the season so filled with dinners, déjeuners, teas and cocktail parties...Jews occupied the best tables in the restaurants and the best seats in the theaters". After the German occupation, Barcza fled to Switzerland. From his place in exile, Barcza was very much opposed to the policies of General Döme Sztójay in deporting the Hungarian Jews to the Auschwitz-Birkenau death camp. On 3 June 1944, Barcza signed a public letter of protest against the genocide in Hungary, asking for Sztójay to stop the deportations at once. Barcza served as the unofficial leader of the Committee of Envoys, a group of 37 former Hungarian diplomats based in Switzerland who served as a sort of government-in-exile in opposition to the Sztójay government.

== Exile ==
Barcza did not return to Hungary after World War Two. He lived in Switzerland until 1951, where he wrote his memoirs recounting his career in diplomacy from 1911 to 1945. In 1951, he settled in Sydney. During his time in Australia, he served as president of the Hungarian Society of Australia. He died in 1961.

== Books and articles ==
- Bán, András (2004). Hungarian-British Diplomacy, 1938-1941: The Attempt to Maintain Relations. Psychology Press. ISBN 978-0-7146-8565-6. Archived from the original on 2016-08-19 – via Questia.
- Barker, Elizabeth (1976). British Policy in South-East Europe in the Second World War. London: Macmillan. ISBN 978-1-349-02198-7.
- Becker, Andras (October 2015). "The Dynamics of British Official Policy towards Hungarian Revisionism, 1938–39". The Slavonic and East European Review. 93 (4): 655–691. doi:10.5699/slaveasteurorev2.93.4.0655.
- Braham, Randolph L. (Summer 1977). "The Jewish Question in German-Hungarian Relations during the Kállay Era". Jewish Social Studies. 39 (3): 183–208.
- Cornelius, Deborah S. (2011). Hungary in World War II Caught in the Cauldron. New York: Fordham University Press. ISBN 9780823237739.
- Faust, Anita; Németh, Viktória (January 2024). "György Barcza – Hungarian Diplomat in an Era of Change: György Barcza's Foreign Service in Northern Europe between 1916 and 1922". West Bohemian Historical Review. XIV (1): 67–88.
- Kranzler, David (2000). The Man Who Stopped the Trains to Auschwitz George Mantello, El Salvador, and Switzerland's Finest Hour. Syracuse: Syracuse University Press. ISBN 9780815628736.
- Romsics, Ignac (2017). "Hungary". In David Stahel (ed.). Joining Hitler's Crusade European Nations and the Invasion of the Soviet Union, 1941. Cambridge: Cambridge University Press. pp. 79–106. ISBN 9781316510346.
- Turbucz, Dávid (Winter 2025). "Under the Influence of His Leader Cult: Miklós Horthy's Self-Image During World War II". Hungarian Studies Review. 52 (1): 67–85.
