= Imre Csáky =

Imre Csáky may refer to:

- Imre Csáky (cardinal)
- Imre Csáky (Minister of Foreign Affairs)
