= Pál Teleki =

Hungarian prime minister (1879–1941)

Count Pál Teleki de Szék
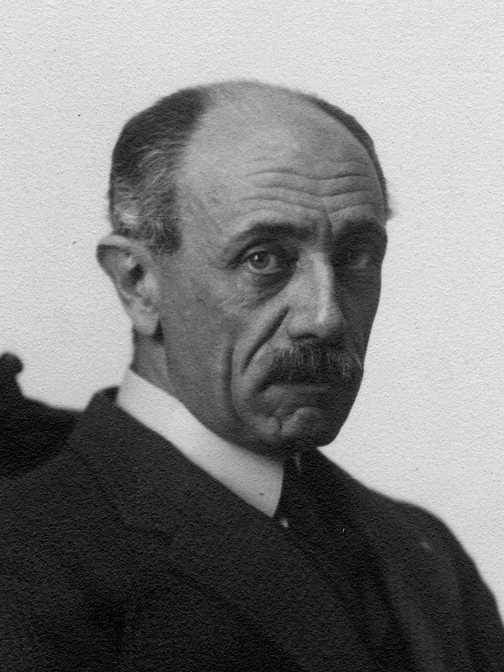
- Formal portrait, 1930

Prime Minister of the Kingdom of Hungary
- In office 16 February 1939 – 3 April 1941
- Monarch: Vacant
- Deputy: Ferenc Keresztes-Fischer
- Regent: Miklós Horthy
- Preceded by: Béla Imrédy
- Succeeded by: László Bárdossy
- In office 19 July 1920 – 14 April 1921
- Monarch: Vacant
- Deputy: Gyula Ferdinandy
- Regent: Miklós Horthy
- Preceded by: Sándor Simonyi-Semadam
- Succeeded by: István Bethlen

Minister of Religion and Education
- In office 4 May 1938 – 16 February 1939
- Prime Minister: Béla Imrédy
- Preceded by: Bálint Hóman
- Succeeded by: Bálint Hóman

Minister of Foreign Affairs
- In office 19 April 1920 – 19 July 1920
- Prime Minister: Sándor Simonyi-Semadam
- Preceded by: József Somssich
- Succeeded by: Imre Csáky

Personal details
- Born: 1 November 1879 Budapest, Austria-Hungary
- Died: 3 April 1941 (aged 61) Budapest, Hungary
- Cause of death: Suicide by firearm
- Resting place: Máriabesnyő Cemetery
- Party: Unity Party
- Other political affiliations: National Constitution Party; KNEP
- Spouse: Countess Johanna von Bissingen-Nippenburg
- Children: 2, including Géza Teleki
- Parent: Géza Teleki (father)
- Education: University of Budapest (PhD)
- Occupation: Politician · Geographer
- Awards: Grand Cross of the Order of Saint Stephen of Hungary
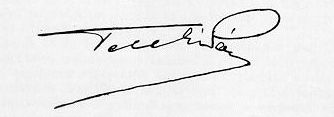
- Signature

Count Pál János Ede Teleki de Szék (1 November 1879 – 3 April 1941) was a Hungarian politician who served as Prime Minister of the Kingdom of Hungary from 1920 to 1921 and from 1939 to 1941. He was also an expert in geography, a university professor, a member of the Hungarian Academy of Sciences, and chief scout of the Hungarian Scout Association. He descended from an aristocratic family from Transylvania.

Teleki tried to keep Hungary neutral during the early stages of the Second World War despite cooperating with Nazi Germany to regain Hungarian territory lost in the Treaty of Trianon. When Teleki learned that German troops had entered Hungary en route to invade Yugoslavia, effectively killing hopes of Hungarian neutrality, he committed suicide.

He is a controversial figure in Hungarian history because as prime minister he tried to preserve Hungarian autonomy under difficult political circumstances, but also proposed and enacted far-reaching anti-Jewish laws.

== Early life ==
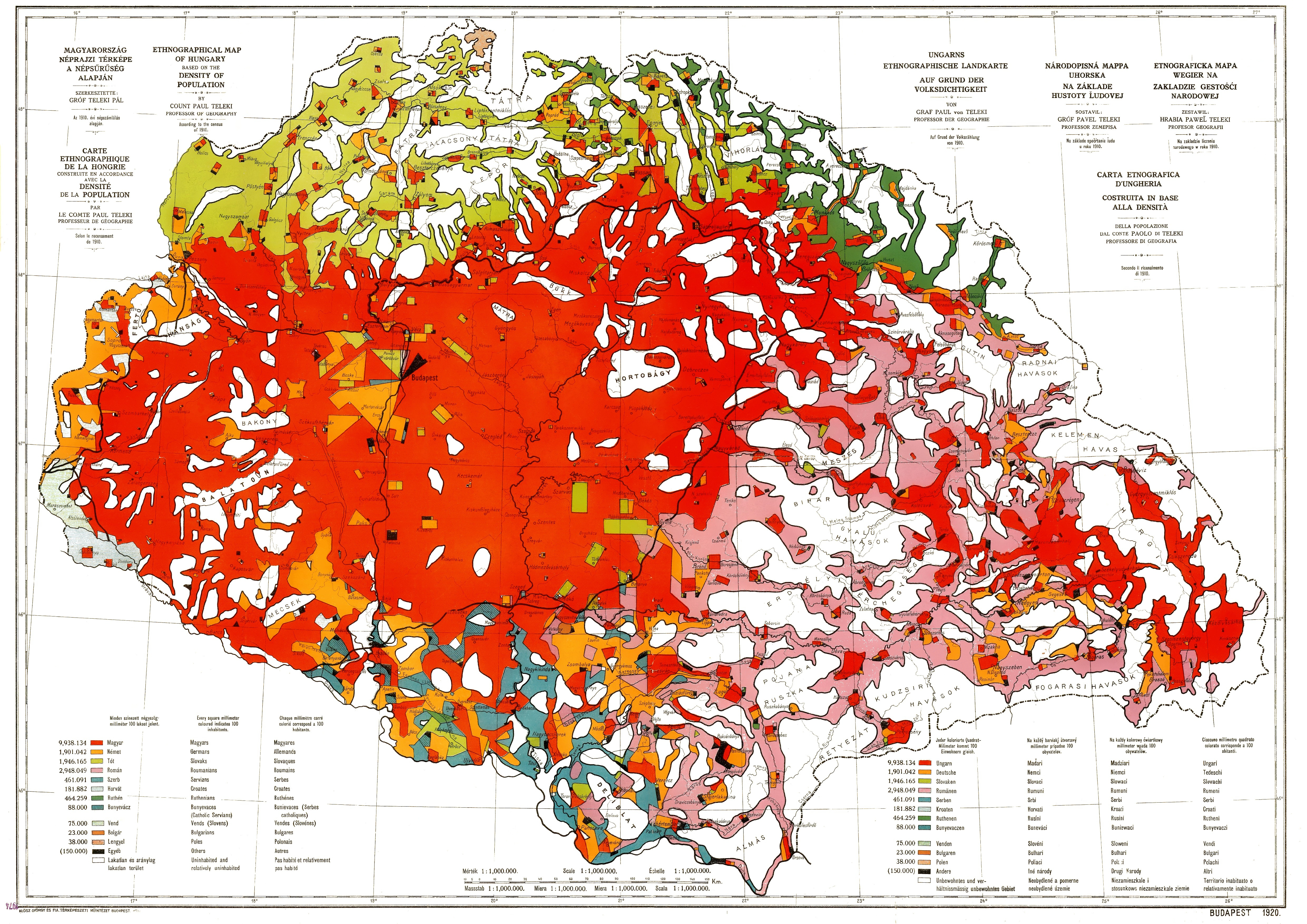
The Red Map. Ethnic map of Hungary proper publicized by the Hungarian delegation at the peace talks in Trianon. Regions with population density below 20 persons/km² are left blank and the corresponding population is represented in the nearest region with population density above that limit. The vibrant, dominant red color was deliberately chosen to mark Hungarians while the light purple color of the Romanians, who were already the majority in the whole of Transylvania back then, is shadow-like. Hungarians Germans Slovaks Rusyns Romanians Serbs Spaces with a smaller density than 20 persons/sq km

Teleki was born to Géza Teleki (1844–1913), a Hungarian politician and Interior Minister, and his wife Irén Muráty (Muratisz) (1852–1941), the only child of a very wealthy Greek merchant and banking family, in Budapest, Hungary. Irén Muráty was fluent in Greek. Her family, the Muráty (Greek: Μουράτη), originally came from Kozani, in northern Greece. Regarding Irén Muráty, a possible Aromanian origin has also been speculated, as "Greek" primarily referred to Orthodox merchants from the Balkans, rather than an ethnic group. Furthermore, a member of the Muráty family appears on the list of donors for the 1868 Romanian Youth ball in Pest.

Teleki attended Budapest Lutheran elementary school from 1885 to 1889, and Pest Calasanz High School ("gymnazium") from 1889 to 1897. In 1897 he started upper-division work at Budapest University studying law and political science. Teleki then studied at the Royal Hungarian Academy of Economy in Magyaróvár (Magyaróvári Magyar Királyi Gazdasági Akadémia), and after struggling to complete his studies, graduated with a PhD in 1903. He went on to become a university professor and expert on geography and socio-economic affairs in pre-World War I Hungary and a well-respected educator. For instance, Erik von Kuehnelt-Leddihn was one of his students. He fought in the First World War as a volunteer.

In 1918–19, he compiled and published a map depicting the ethnographic make up of the Hungarian nation. Based on the density of population according to the 1910 census, the so-called Red map was created for the peace talk in Treaty of Trianon. His maps were an excellent composition of social and geographic data, even by today's well-developed Geographic Information System's point of view. From 1911 to 1913 he was Director of Scientific Publishing for the Institute of Geography, and from 1910 to 1923 he was Secretary General of the Geographical Society. He was a delegate to the Versailles Peace Conference in 1919. Between 1937 and 1939, he was the Hungarian representative in the International committee on intellectual cooperation of the League of Nations.

== Scouting ==
In the summer of 1927, Teleki's son Géza, a member of the Hungarian Sea Scouts, was attending a Sea Scout rally held at Helsingør, Denmark. On a sailing cruise, he ignored a reprimand from his Scoutmaster, Fritz M. de Molnár, for failure to carry out a small but necessary exercise of seamanship. Molnár tried to drive home his point by threatening to tell the boy's father on their return to Budapest. Géza replied "Oh, Dad's not interested in Scouting." This roused Molnár's mettle, and he determined to take up the subject of Scouting with Count Teleki.

Molnár's talk about Scouting intrigued Teleki, and he was instrumental in supporting Scouting within Hungary. He became Hungary's Chief Scout, a member of the International Scout Committee from 1929 until 1939, Camp Chief of the 4th World Scout Jamboree held at The Royal Forest at Gödöllő, Hungary, Chief Scout of the Hungarian Scout Association, and a close friend and contemporary of Robert Baden-Powell, 1st Baron Baden-Powell. His influence and inspiration were a major factor in the success of Scouting in Hungary, and contributed to its success in other countries as well.

== Political life ==
=== 1905-1920 ===
He first ran in the 1905 elections under the banner of the National Constitutional Party, formed from the "dissidents" of the Liberal Party led by junior Gyula Andrássy, in the electoral district of Nagysomkút in Szatmár County. He was elected as a member of parliament. He secured his mandate again in the 1906 elections. However, by the 1910 elections, when the collapse of the coalition government became evident, he chose not to pursue another mandate and temporarily withdrew from politics. At that time, he was not yet a significant political figure. He served as a volunteer in World War I, fighting first on the Serbian front and then on the Italian front, where he held the rank of captain until 1917. He was subsequently appointed head of the National War Relief Office.

After the victory of the Aster Revolution, he retreated from public life and stayed in Switzerland during the period of the Hungarian Soviet Republic. Meanwhile, at the request of the Anti-Bolshevik Committee, he served as foreign minister in the counter-revolutionary governments in Szeged (all three of them). Teleki was first based in Vienna as a member of the Anti-Bolshevik Committee while in the French-occupied city of Szeged, another more radical anti-Communist group led by Admiral Miklós Horthy and Gyula Gömbös was forming the National Army to fight the Soviet Republic. The two anti-Communist groups eventually merged, not the least of which was the Szeged group actually had a military force. Despite what Admiral Horthy was to later claim as he maintained that he had overthrown the Soviet Republic, the Hungarian Soviet Republic was overthrown in August 1919 after being defeated in a war with Romania and after the Romanians pulled out of Hungary in November 1919, Horthy with French permission led his National Army in occupying the rest of Hungary.

In the first elections following the victory of the counter-revolution in 1920, he won a parliamentary mandate in the city center district of Szeged representing the Christian National Union Party. In the government formed on March 15 by Simonyi-Semadam, he was appointed foreign minister, a position he accepted on April 19. He attended the signing of the Treaty of Trianon in this capacity, although the actual signing was carried out by two other politically insignificant members of the Hungarian delegation. The government resigned a month later, and Horthy requested Teleki to form a new cabinet, which he accepted.

=== First premiership ===
On July 25, 1920, Miklós Horthy appointed Teleki as Prime Minister. Additionally, he served as the minister without portfolio for national minorities and led the Ministry of Foreign Affairs. Following King Charles IV's attempt to return, he resigned from the premiership on April 14, 1921.

One of the most controversial issues during Teleki's first administration was the numerus clausus law, specifically the 1920 Act XXV ('regulating enrollment in universities, the technical university, the Budapest University of Economics, and law academies'), which means 'closed number' (i.e., a defined, fixed number). It was introduced to Parliament by the Minister of Religion and Public Education and was adopted in September 1920. The law aimed primarily to adjust the number of students in Hungarian higher education to the perceived or actual needs of the country, intending to limit the number of those entering higher education. The proportion of students was meant to reflect the ratio of the 'ethnic groups' living in Hungary. The main objective of the law was to ensure that 'Hungarians' (excluding Jewish Hungarians) participated in universities in proportion to their numbers within the population. The law provoked deep outrage among Jewish communities in Hungary as it questioned their Hungarian identity. Many regarded the law as the first anti-Jewish law, as it primarily restricted the Jewish community, treating them as a separate nationality rather than by their religious denomination, which deviated from previous legal practices, effectively categorizing them as non-Hungarians.

=== Party Leader ===
In 1938, Teleki regained a parliamentary mandate in a by-election in the Tokaj district, resigning from his membership in the upper house to rejoin the House of Representatives. On May 14, 1938, he became the Minister of Religion and Public Education in the newly formed Imrédy government, a position he held until Imrédy's downfall. He was one of the leading members of the Hungarian delegation during the negotiations of the First Vienna Award. In contrast to the Imrédy government, which turned toward Germany and Italy, the Axis Powers, he was a staunch Anglophile. As an internationally respected geographer, Teleki was known as the scholar politician, which had attracted attention both at home and abroad. Besides for his native Magyar, Teleki was fluent in German, French and English. In Britain, Teleki was best known as the Honorary Chief Scout of Hungary, who appeared at Scouting conventions dressed in his Baden-Powell cap and badges.

On February 2, 1939, as a solution to the parliamentary conflict (after 62 government party representatives had previously split and turned against Imrédy), under Teleki's leadership, the government party and the former 'dissident' representatives reunited, and the government party adopted the name Hungarian Life Party (previously known as the National Unity Party).

=== Preserved Hungarian autonomy ===
Some view Teleki as a moral hero who tried to avoid Hungary's involvement in World War II. He sent Tibor Eckhardt, a high ranking Smallholders Party politician, to the United States with $5 million for the Hungarian Minister in the United States, János Pelényi, to prepare the Hungarian government in exile, for when he and Regent Horthy would have to leave the country. According to supporters of this view, his object was to save what could be saved, under political and military pressure from Nazi Germany, and like the Polish government in exile, to try to survive in some fashion during the war years to come.

=== Teleki holds Hungary to "Non-belligerent" status ===
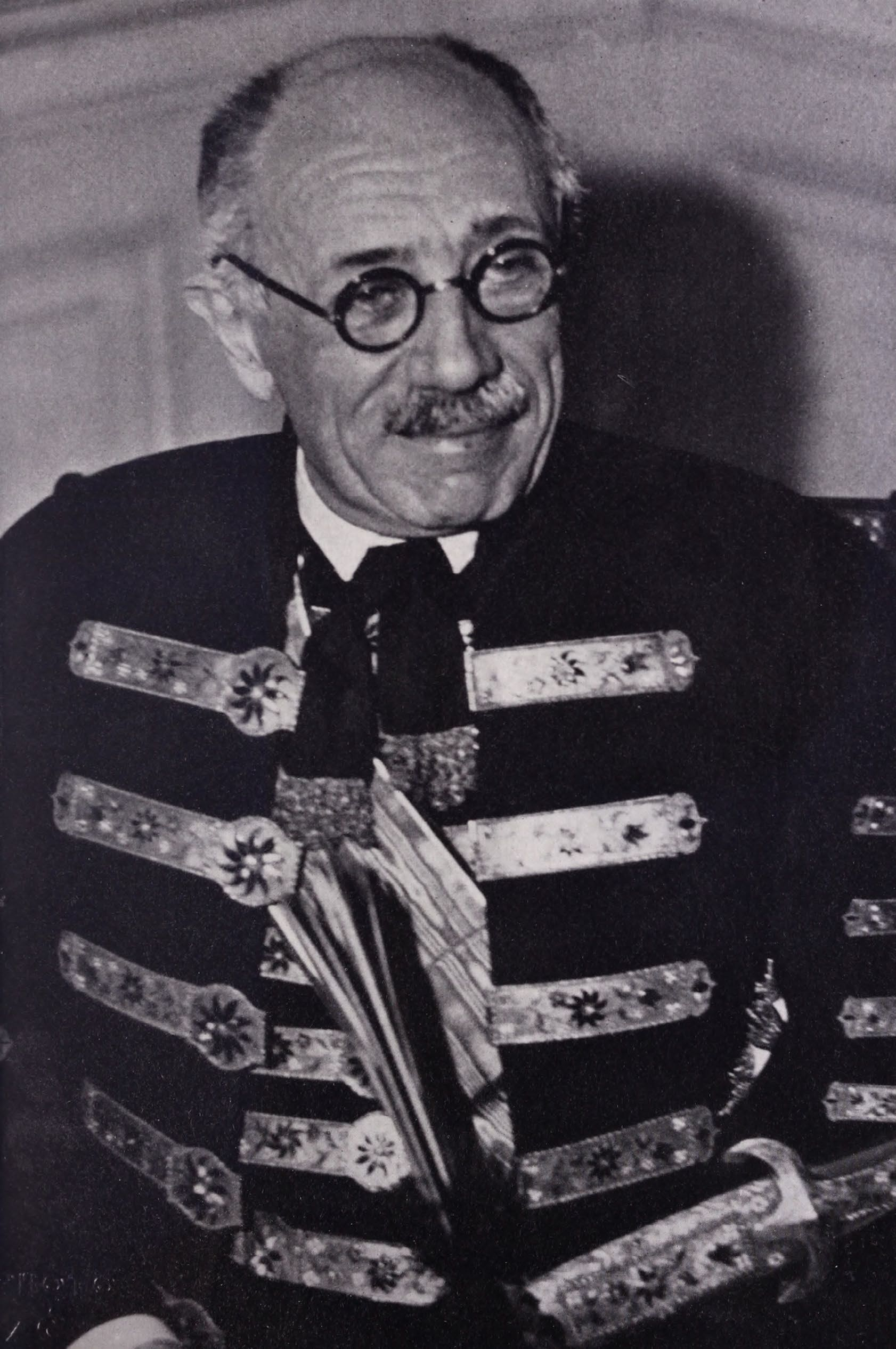
Pál Teleki in 1939

Rejoining the government in 1938 as Minister of Education, Teleki supported Germany's take over of Czechoslovakia with the hopes that the dismemberment of Hungary completed in the 1920 Treaty of Trianon would be undone. On 16 February 1939, Hungarian Prime Minister Béla Imrédy, who had been known as a pro-fascist, anti-Semitic leader, was forced from office after it was revealed that he was of Jewish descent. Teleki became Prime minister for the second time on 15 February 1939. While he strove to close down several fascist political parties, he did nothing to end the existing anti-Semitic laws. One of Teleki's first acts was to introduce the second Jewish law on 24 February 1939 to Parliament for ratification, following widespread complaints that the first Jewish law passed by the Imrédy government was not extreme enough.

The former prime minister István Bethlen had advised Horthy against appointing Teleki as prime minister. Bethlen considered Teleki to be too idealistic to be a successful politician as well as having a naive "childlike romanticism" that made him ill-suited for the rough world of politics. Finally, Teleki was not a great orator as his speeches failed to create any enthusiasm in those who heard them and he was an equally poor debater, who did not fare well in parliamentary debates. Teleki's work as a geographer had convinced him that the lands around the Danube river were a natural geographical and economic unit, which accordingly should be united politically. He had lost his family's estate in Transylvania, which had become part of Romania, and he was strongly opposed to the Treaty of Trianon. However, Teleki was one of the few Hungarian politicians prepared to moderate the campaign against the Treaty of Trianon as he favored creating some sort of Danubian federation as the ultimate objective instead of simply restoring Hungary to the pre-Trianon frontiers.

Teleki's major interest in foreign policy was seeking to annex the autonomous Carpatho-Ukraine region of Czecho-Slovakia (as Czechoslovakia had been renamed in October 1938). Carpatho-Ukraine, also known as Ruthenia, had belonged to Hungary until 1919, but however the region had an Ukrainian majority with the Magyars as a minority. Teleki put forward the demand for annexation on a geographic and economic grounds as he noted that the Tisza river flowed down from the Carpathian mountains and he accused the Czechoslovak authorities of permitting deforestation in the Carpathians, which were the cause of floods on the Great Hungarian Plain. Teleki's real reason for seeking to annex Carpatho-Ukraine was to secure a common border with Poland as he felt that a Polish-Hungarian alliance was the best way of resisting Germany's claims that all of Eastern Europe should be belong to the exclusive German sphere of influence, both politically and economically. Teleki's plans for an invasion of Czechoslovakia were exploited by Adolf Hitler for his own ends. Teleki was informed that Germany supported his plans for Carpatho-Ukraine. Unknown to Teleki, he was being used. Father Jozef Tiso, the leader of the autonomous Slovakia region had proved reluctant to declare independence as he wanted to maintain a link with the Czechs to resist Hungarian claims against Slovakia. Tiso was told by the Germans that he either declare independence with Slovakia under the protection of the Reich or else see all of Slovakia annexed to Hungary. On 14 March 1939 Tiso declared independence, which was used by Hitler as an excuse to occupy the Czech half of Czecho-Slovakia on 15 March 1939 under the grounds that Czecho-Slovakia was faced with a civil war that would be threatening to Germany. The Czechoslovak president Emil Hácha was summoned to the Reich Chancellery where Hitler accused him of permitting "disorder" on Germany's borders, and to put an end to the "disorder" (which Hitler himself had instigated) was told to sign away his country's independence or else face a German invasion. Hácha promptly capitulated and signed away Czecho-Slovakia's independence. The occupied Czech lands became the Protectorate of Bohemia and Moravia. The Hungarians were rewarded by Hitler for their part in the destruction of Czecho-Slovakia by being permitted to invade and annex Carpatho-Ukraine (which also declared independence on 15 March 1939), which thus allowed Teleki to boast that he taken back some of the land lost under the Treaty of Trianon.

On 15 March 1939, the Hungarians invaded Carpatho-Ukraine with the conquest being completed by 18 March. The short, victorious war in the Carpathians led to the impression in Hungary that the Honved (Royal Hungarian Army) was far stronger than what it really was, which greatly strengthened the prestige of the Honved while making Teleki's thesis that Hungary should peacefully revise the Treaty of Trianon appear ineffective. On 17 March 1939, the British prime minister Neville Chamberlain gave a speech in Birmingham warning that Britain would resist any German attempt to dominate the world by any and all means up to war. In late March 1939, Hitler started to demand that the Free City of Danzig (modern Gdańsk, Poland) should be allowed to "go home to the Reich" or else Germany would go to war with Poland. As France had signed a treaty of alliance with Poland in 1921, any German invasion of Poladn would automatically cause a Franco-German war. On 31 March 1939, Chamberlain gave the famous "guarantee" of Poland, promising in a speech in the House of Commons that Britain would go to war against any attempt to end Polish independence, through notably the "guarantee" did not extend to the frontiers of Poland. Teleki watched the gathering Danzig crisis, which threatened to start another world war with grave concern as he became convinced that the European civilization as it currently existed was in grave peril.

Teleki made his first foreign visit to Rome, where he and his foreign minister Count István Csáky met Benito Mussolini and his foreign minister, Count Galeazzo Ciano. Both Mussolini and Ciano assured Teleki that the traditional Italo-Hungarian alliance against Yugoslavia still stood. On 11 April 1939, Teleki announced in a speech in Rome that Hungary was leaving the League of Nations, a symbolic step that aligned Hungary with the Axis powers. On 29 April 1939, Teleki in his second foreign trip as prime minister visited Berlin to see Hitler and his foreign minister, Joachim von Ribbentrop. On 30 April 1939 he saw the lavish celebrations of Hitler's 50th birthday in Berlin, which featured an enormous military parade down the Wilhelmstraße (the street in Berlin where most of the government offices were located) as Hitler reviewed his soldiers from the Reich Chancellery. Teleki was in Berlin that day, but was slighted by not being invited to attend Hitler's birthday party at the Reich Chancellery, a clear sign of Hitler's disapproval. To rub in the snub, Imrédy along with another former prime minister Kálmán Darányi attended Hitler's birthday party. During his meeting with Hitler and Ribbentrop, Teleki was told that Germany did not want a war with Poland, but would go to war if the Poles refused to allow the Free City of Danzig to "go home to the Reich", and that if necessary Germany would go to war with both France and Britain as well. Teleki came away from his meeting with Hitler and Ribbentrop convinced that the Danzig crisis was going to cause another world war. Despite the way that Hitler and Ribbentrop claimed not to want a war with Poland, Teleki was struck by their belligerent tone along with suggestions that another world war that will millions of more people than the last world war would was not something to fear.

Upon his return from Germany, Teleki asked Horthy to dissolve Parliament for elections on 28 May. As part of an effort to defuse support for the Arrow Cross Party, Parliament passed the second Jewish law on 28 April 1939. In the elections, the ruling Party of Hungarian Life as the Unity Party had been renamed, won the majority of the seats, winning 187 seats out of 260 seats. The Arrow Cross Party won 25% of the vote, which seen as a major success for a party that never contested an election before. Teleki had allowed Imrédy to choose a number of the candidates for the Party of Hungarian Life and as result 30 of the government party's MPs elected were loyal to Imrédy, which forced Teleki to govern as if he had a minority government instead of a majority government. Reflecting the irrelevance of the left to most Hungarians, the Social Democrats won only 5 seats while the liberal Bourgeois Freedom Party likewise won 5 seats. Regardless if they belonged to the government party or not, the overwhelming number of MPs elected were on the right. At least part of the reason for the triumph of the anti-Semitic radical parties in the elections was due to the way that Teleki had disfranchised most Hungarian Jews. Under the second Jewish law that Teleki had passed, Hungarian Jews lost their right to vote and ran for office unless they could prove that their families had been living at the same address since 1867. As most Hungarian Jews had been living in the countryside at the start of the 19th century, and moved to Budapest and other cities over the course of the 19th century as industrialisation and urbanisation gathered pace, there were very Jewish families who could prove that their families had been living at the same address continuously since 1867. Thus, the second Jewish law had disfranchised most Jewish voters, which helped to explain why the anti-Semitic Arrow Cross Party did well in electing MPs from ridings in Budapest despite the way that Budapest had significant Jewish population. After the 1939 election, Teleki expressed much displeasure with the quality of debates in Parliament and voiced support for doing away with parliamentary democracy, saying that all the MPs ever did was insult and shout at one another. Teleki stated: "In today's parliamentary system, the lower house, does not reflect a true picture of the nation, often slips from the serious level, a party political area, which offers circus much more than bread, not so much to the nation, but rather to an audience". A devout Roman Catholic, Teleki favored restructuring Hungarian society along the lines of the 1931 encyclical, Quadragesimo anno, issued by Pope Pius XI. Teleki favored creating a corporatist system along the lines recommended in Quadragesimo anno to create corporations which would unite the leaders of labour and capital as a way to resolve social conflicts. Through Catholics were in the majority in Hungary, but Hungary had a significant Protestant minority who objected to the plans to use Catholic social teaching as the basis for societal reorganisation.

In May 1939, Teleki established the labour service battalions of the Honved (Royal Hungarian Army) to which "unreliable" people drafted into the Honved were to serve. The "unreliable" people serving in the Labour Service battalions were primarily Hungarian Jews, but also included other groups such as Roma, pacificists, leftists, and homosexuals. As the frontiers of Hungary expanded between 1938-1941, men of military age who were Serbs, Slovaks, Ukrainians, and Romanians living under Hungarian rule who were not trusted to fight for Hungary were sent to the labour service battalions instead of the regular units of the Honved. Telekei had been inspired by the labour service battalions established by Horthy in his National Army that he founded in 1919, to which Hungarian Jews wanting to fight against the Soviet Republic were assigned as Horthy did not trust giving Jews arms. The first men drafted into the labour service started their duties on 1 July 1939. However, for the first two years or so of the labour service, conditions were harsh but tolerable for the labour servicemen. It was until April 1941 under Teleki's successor László Bárdossy that conditions in the labour service battalions started the descent into brutality that made the labour service so dreaded and feared in World War Two.

On 11 August 1939, Ribbentrop and Ciano had a meeting at the Schloss Fuschl, where Ribbentrop first revealed to Ciano the secret behind the Danzig crisis, namely that Danzig was a pretext and that Hitler had decided firmly upon a war with Poland and as such he expected Italy to honor the Pact of Steel if Britain and France should war on the Reich. From sources in Italy, Teleki learned that Hitler had decided firmly to go ahead with the invasion of Poland and there no diplomatic compromise was possible to end the crisis. In response, Teleki wrote Hitler a letter in German saying that Hungary would continue to associate with the Axis powers , but "...if no serious change occurs in the given circumstances Hungary cannot on moral grounds be in a position to take armed action against Poland'. Csáky when he visited Berlin shortly afterwards was told by Ribbentrop that Germany might give back to Slovakia all of the lands that Hungary had gained in 1938-1939 along with restoring independence to Carpatho-Ukraine if Teleki continued on his present course in foreign policy. Csáky told Ribbentrop to just pretend that Teleki had never written his letter. Germany cut off all arms deliveries to Hungary in late August 1939 citing Teleki's "unfriendly" attitude in the Danzig crisis. Teleki instructed György Barcza, the Hungarian minister in London, to tell the British Foreign Secretary Lord Halifax, that Hungary would not enter the war on Germany's side, would do nothing to assist with any attack on Poland and would its best to remain neutral.

Teleki had difficult relations with his hawkish Defense Minister, General Károly Bartha, and the even more hawkish Chief of the General Staff, General Henrik Werth. Bartha and especially Werth favored a strong pro-Nazi line and advocated having Hungary enter the war on the Axis side. Both Bartha and Werth disapproved of Teleki's foreign policy and constantly pressured him to take a pro-German line in the Danzig crisis. Bartha and Werth were assisted by the Hungarian minister in Berlin, General Döme Sztójay, a man who regarded himself as representing the General Staff in Berlin instead of the Foreign ministry, and consistently sought to sabotage Teleki's foreign policy by leaking information to the Germans. Teleki's plans for autonomy for Ruthenia as the Hungarians called Carpatho-Ukraine were vetoed by Werth.

On 24 August 1939, Nazi Germany and the Soviet Union signed the Molotov–Ribbentrop Pact, which stipulated the Soviet Union's long-standing "interest" in Bessarabia region of Romania. One week later, on 1 September 1939, Germany invaded Poland and demanded the use of the Hungarian railway system through Kassa (then in Hungary) so that German troops could attack Poland from the south. Hungary traditionally had strong ties with Poland, and Teleki refused Germany's demand. Horthy told the German ambassador that "he would sooner blow up the rail lines than to participate in an attack on Poland" (which would completely paralyse the only railway connection from Hungary to Poland, if the Germans decided to march through Hungary without permission). Hungary declared that it was a "non-belligerent" nation and refused to allow German forces to travel through or over Hungary to attack Poland. As a result of Teleki's refusal to co-operate with Germany, during the autumn of 1939 and the summer of 1940 more than 100,000 Polish soldiers, and hundreds of thousands of civilians, many of them Jewish, escaped from Poland and crossed the border into Hungary. The Hungarian government then permitted the Polish Red Cross and the Polish Catholic Church to operate in the open. The Polish soldiers were formally interned, but most of them managed to flee to France by spring of 1940, thanks to the indulgent or friendly attitude of officials. Werth was so enraged by Teleki's "zig-zag" foreign policy that in October 1939 he threatened to resign in protest.

However, with Germany's seizure of Austria, Czechoslovakia and Poland, the buffer nations between Hungary and the belligerent nations of Germany and Soviet Union had evaporated. Germany made economic demands on Hungary to support the war, and offered to repay with arms deliveries, but because of developments in the Balkans, they were routed to the Romanian Army instead. During the Phoney War, Teleki came under strong pressure from Ribbentrop to integrate the Hungarian economy under the German economy.. Germany had more people than what German agriculture was capable of feeding, and following the outbreak of war, Germany was placed under a British naval blockade. Ribbentrop wanted to import Hungarian agricultural products into the Reich to avoid a repeat of the "hunger blockade" of World War One, and in particular wanted the pengô artificially devalued in regards to the Reichmark, which would allow Germany to buy Hungarian food at ultra-cheap prices. In response, Germany continued the arms embargo on Hungary, which led to the very strong pressure being applied on Teleki by Bartha and Werth, who were desperate to import German arms to modernise the Honved (Hungary had no arms industry of its own). In December 1939-January 1940, Teleki signed a series of economic agreements with Germany, promising that German corporations would always be the first to invest in Hungary and agreeing to allow the value of the pengô to follow in regards to the Reichmark.

In his diaries, Italian Foreign Minister Galeazzo Ciano, Mussolini's son-in-law, wrote that during a visit to Rome by Teleki in March 1940, Teleki "has avoided taking any open position one way or the other but has not hidden his sympathy for the Western Powers and fears an integral German victory like the plague". Ciano reported that Teleki later said that he hoped "for the defeat of Germany, not a complete defeat—that might provoke violent shocks—but a kind of defeat that would blunt her teeth and claws for a long time". Starting in March 1940, Teleki started to make plans to set a government-in-exile in Britain should Germany invade Romania. Throughout the Phoney War, Teleki faced strong pressure from Werth to make an alliance with Germany and invade Romania with the aim of taking back Transylvania. On 1 April 1940, Teleki told the Council of Ministers that Britain and France had issued a joint "guarantee" of Romania on 13 April 1939 and that any Hungarian attack on Romania would trigger Anglo-French declarations of war on Hungary. In response, Werth stated that the Anglo-French "guarantee" was the all the more reason to make an alliance with Germany. Teleki and Csáky stated to grant transit rights to Germany to invade Romania would be the end of Hungary's independence. He was able to veto Werth's plans to invade Romania for the moment, but Teleki did give Werth permission to open staff talks with Germany for a joint German-Hungarian invasion of Romania. In May 1940, when the German invasion of France was more successful than expected, Teleki started serious preparations for a government-in-exile. On 14 May 1940, Barcza asked Sir Orme Sargent of the Foreign Office if Britain would be willing to host a Hungarian government-in-exile and received a positive response.

=== Germany demands Hungary's assistance ===
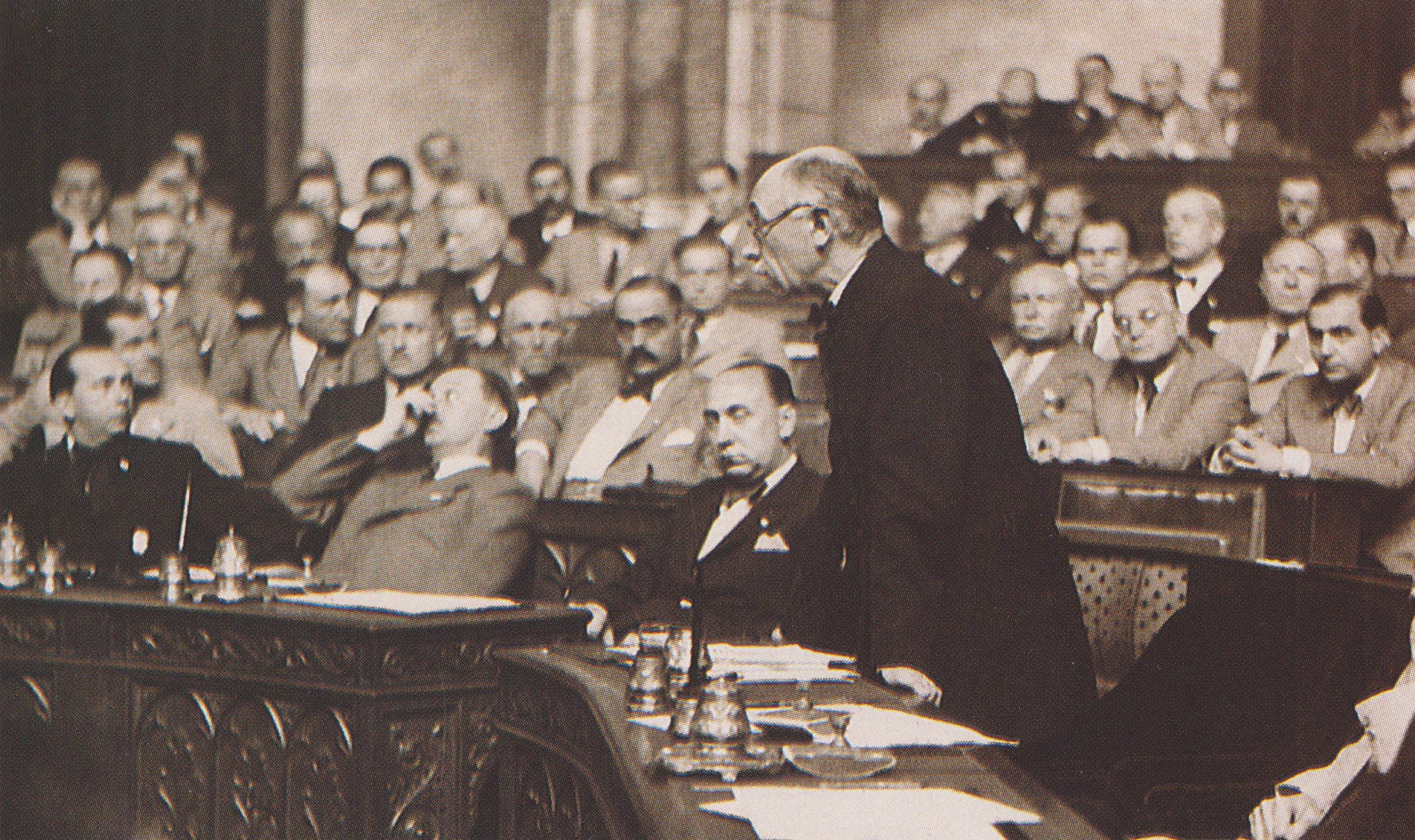
Pál Teleki in the Hungarian Parliament in June 1939

In June 1940, the Soviet Union issued an ultimatum to Romania demanding the return of the Bessarabia region or else the Soviets would declare war on Romania. After Bessarabia was returned to the Soviet Union, Teleki demanded that King Carol II of Romania return Transylvania to Hungary under the grounds that if the Soviet Union was entitled to take back Bessarabia, Hungary was entitled to take back Transylvania. France, Romania's chief ally, had been defeated in June 1940 while King Carol had renounced the British "guarantee" given in April 1939. With Romania's two principle allies unable to help, Teleki believed that the summer of 1940 was the ideal time for Hungary to take on Romania. However, Romania was rich in oil and the most efficient way for Romanian oil to reach Germany was via Hungary. On 10 July 1940, in a meeting in Munich Ribbentrop told Teleki that Germany did not want a war in the Balkans that might threaten its access to Romanian oil, and stated that Germany wanted the Transylvania dispute resolved peacefully. After the failure of the Hungarian-Romanian talks, Bartha pressed very strongly at a meeting of the Council of Ministers for a war against Romania, saying "...that means that for our part if we start military action Romania will talk differently". On 23 August 1940, Werth announced that Hungary had started mobilising and an invasion of Romania would start on 28 August 1940. On 26 August, Ribbentrop ordered both Hungary and Romania to send delegations to Vienna, saying that Germany along with Italy was going to resolve the Transylvania crisis before it caused a war. At the conference in Vienna on 30 August 1940, Ribbentrop announced that the northern part of Transylvania would be returned to Hungary while the Romania would keep the rest, a compromise that deeply displeased both sides. The news of the Second Vienna Award was greeted with joy in Hungary, but Teleki was extremely depressed at the award, complaining that his entire policy was to keep Germany out of the crisis, which had been sabotaged by Werth who told the German air attache that Hungary was willing to accept German arbitration. Upon his return from Vienna, Teleki did not come out of his train to greet the cheering crowds and refused to give any speeches to mark the award.

In 1940, Germany used the Soviet Union's imminent movement to take over Bessarabia as an excuse to prepare to occupy the vital Romanian oil fields. Germany's General Staff approached Hungary's General Staff and sought passage of its troops through Hungary and for Hungary's participation in the takeover. Germany held out Transylvania as Hungary's reward. The Hungarian government resisted, desired to remain neutral and held out some hope for assistance from the Italians. Hungary sent a special envoy to Rome: "For the Hungarians there arises the problem either of letting the Germans pass, or opposing them with force. In either case the Hungarian liberty would come to an end". Mussolini replied, "How could this ever be since I am Hitler's ally and intend to remain so?" However, Teleki allowed German troops to cross Hungarian territory into southern Romania, with the reward in August 1940 of the return to Hungary of a large part of Teleki's ancestral Transylvanian homeland in the Second Vienna Award.

Teleki soon learned that there was a price to be paid for accepting the Second Vienna Award. At the same conference in Vienna, the Hungarians signed an agreement that made the Nazi-aligned Volksbund der Deutschen in Ungarn (People's League of Germans in Hungary) the legal party for Hungarian volksdeutsche (ethnic Germans). The same agreement gave the Volksbund wide power to govern affairs in the volksdeutsche community such as running their own schools, in effect creating a "state within the state". On 10 October 1940, Teleki signed another economic agreement with Germany. Under the economic agreement, the pengő was artificially devalued to the Reichmark, which made Hungarians exports to Germany very cheap while making German exports to Hungary very expensive. The same agreement committed the Hungarians to importing the same value of goods and products from Germany to match their exports to Germany.

By 1940, Teleki's relations with Werth were close to the breaking point. Teleki often complained that Werth was an openly subordinate soldier who acted like he was above taking orders from civilian authority and sought to undermine his foreign policy by maintaining direct links to Germany, the precise details of which he was not informed of. Werth and Teleki were also in conflict over Werth's practice of making his own military budgets with no effort to consult any of the other ministries. Werth told Teleki quite bluntly that it was not his concern that he was imposing a level of military expenditure that was beyond Hungary's financial capability to pay for, saying that it was Teleki's responsibility to find a way to pay for Hungarian rearnment. Teleki in turn complained that this was an impossible situation where he had no control over the military budget, but was expected to find a way to pay for Werth's military spending. Under the Hungarian system of government, both the Defense Minister and the chief of the general staff reported to Horthy, who held the title of Supreme Warlord, but it was understood that the prime minister as the head of government did exercise some authority over the military. Werth and Teleki also clashed over northern Transylvania. Northern Transylvania had been placed under martial law pending the introduction of civilian rule, and in the interim Werth ruled northern Transylvania. Werth had carried out a harsh policy of Magyarization as he allowed his soldiers to stage several massacres of Romanians and Jews. Teleki saw the Lands of the Crown of St. Istvan as a continuation of the medieval Hungarian kingdom, as a multi-ethnic and multicultural state in which the Maygars would play the leading role (through the Jews were notably excluded from this envisioned state). Werth by contrast had a more racist version of the concept of the Lands of the Crown of St. Istvan as he envisioned a state where no minorities would be permitted to exist besides for his own minority, the Hungarian volksdeutsche (ethnic Germans).

In September 1940, Teleki attempted to resign and in the resignation letter he sent to Horthy he wrote that Hungary had at present had two governments, the "legal government" and the "military government". Teleki went on to write that with the "military government" headed by Werth "the influence of which is growing in almost every branch of the administration and which the legal government is unable to supervise". Horthy refused Teleki's resignation and on 29 September 1940, he instead summoned Teleki, Werth and Bartha to the Royal Castle to resolve the dispute between the generals and the prime minister. Horthy as usual sided with the military against the civilians on most of the issues, but he decided for Teleki on several of the issues most important to the prime minister. The regent ruled that Werth could not make his own military budgets which could not be altered by the Ministry of Finance, saying that Werth would have to adjust his plans for military spending to Hungary's financial capabilities. Horthy also ruled that the martial law in northern Transylvania would end on 26 November 1940 and that on that day civilian rule would come into effect.

Under the Second Jewish Law, Hungarian Jews were only to hold 6% of the jobs in any occupation. The law caused serious economic hardship to many Hungarian Jews, who found themselves unable to work, but Teleki was unwilling to fully enforce the law. In a letter to Teleki in October 1940, Horthy wrote "...it is impossible to discard the Jews, who have everything in their control in one or two years, and to replace them by incompetent, mostly valueless and vociferous elements, because we may flounder". Through the strohman (strawman) system, many Hungarian Jews continued to operate their businesses via nominal Christian owners, a system that was tolerated by Teleki government who feared that it would cause the collapse of the Hungarian economy if the Jewish were enforced to the letter.

In November, Teleki's government signed the Tripartite Pact, a move that would come back to haunt him only a few months later. Seeking to create a counterbalance to Germany, on 12 December 1940 Teleki signed a Treaty of Eternal Friendship with Yugoslavia, which he recognised Croatia and Bosnia-erzegovina as part of Yugoslavia. In December 1940, Teleki's friend, György Barcza, the Hungarian minister plenipotentiary to the United Kingdom, returned to Budapest to celebrate Christmas. At a Christmas party, Teleki told Barcza: "We have to go with the Germans, nothing else is possible, but only to a certain point. And that point is taking part in the war. On no account will we do that...But it's unbelievably difficult, maybe impossible to oppose it. Revision, and I'd only say this to you, is the greatest danger that threatens but I cannot do anything against it, because I would be finished. The public has gone crazy. They want everything back! No matter how and no matter at what price...I'll struggle as long as I can hold out...I'll defend our honor, I won't give up the nation and the country, but if I cannot succeed I will shoot myself in the head". Barcza described Teleki as a man in deep despair. In February 1941, Teleki's foreign minister, Count István Csáky, died and was replaced with a professional diplomat László Bárdossy. Bárdossy was not in agreement with Teleki's Yugoslav policies and sought assurances from the Germans that they supported Hungary's claims against Yugoslavia, which was directly counter to Teleki's policy of trying to improve Hungarian-Yugoslav relations. Teleki and Bárdossy were being played by Hitler to achieve his goals. The Anglophile Regent of Yugoslavia, Prince Paul of Yugoslavia, had resisted German pressure to sign the Tripartite Pact all through the winter of 1940-1941. Hitler and Ribbentrop had offered Prince Paul a "guarantee" of Yugoslavia's borders against any aggression in exchange for signing the Tripartite Pact. From the German perspective, it was useful to have Hungary take a threatening attitude towards Yugoslavia, hence the way Bárdossy was promised German support for Hungary's claims against Yugoslavia. Both Hitler and Ribbentrop were displeased with Teleki's efforts for better Hungarian-Yugoslav relations and encouraged Bárdossy to press for Hungary to take back the lands Hungary had lost to Yugoslavia.

In March 1941, Teleki strongly objected to Hungarian participation in the invasion of Yugoslavia. Hungary's resistance to aiding Germany caused German mistrust. Hungary was not informed of Hitler's top-secret preparations for invading the Soviet Union and was not initially part of the invasion. "Hungary, in the period of preparation for Barbarossa, is not to be counted as an ally beyond the present status...."

Furthermore, German troops were not to cross Hungarian territories, and Hungarian airfields were not to be used by the Luftwaffe, according to the new directives of the High Command on 22 March 1941. Teleki believed that only a Danubian Federation could help the Central and Eastern European states (Austria, Czechoslovakia, Yugoslavia, Romania and Bulgaria) escape Germany's domination.

In the book, Transylvania The Land Beyond the Forest Louis C. Cornish described how Teleki, under constant surveillance by the German Gestapo during 1941, sent a secret communication to contacts in America.

He foresaw clearly the complete defeat of Nazi Germany, and the European chaos that would result from the war. He believed that no future was conceivable for any of the minor nations in Eastern and Central Europe if they tried to continue to live their isolated national lives. He asked his friends in America to help them establish a federal system, to federate. This alone could secure for them the two major assets of national life: first, political and military security, and, second, economic prosperity. Hungary, he emphasized, stood ready to join in such collaboration, provided it was firmly based on the complete equality of all the members states.

In 1941, the American journalist Dorothy Thompson supported the statement of others: "I took from Count Teleki's office a monograph which he had written upon the structure of European nations. A distinguished geographer, he was developing a plan for regional federation, based upon geographical and economic realities". Teleki received no response to his ideas and was left to resolve the situation on his own.

=== Teleki must choose between Axis and Allies ===
The event that eventually led to Teleki's suicide began on 25 March 1941 when Yugoslav Prime Minister Dragisa Cvetkovic and Yugoslav Minister for Foreign Affairs Aleksandar Cincar Marković travelled to Vienna and signed the Tripartite Pact. In the late evening on 26/27 March 1941, Air Force Generals Dušan Simović and Borivoje Mirković had executed a bloodless coup d'état, refuted signatures on the alliance and accepted a British guarantee of security instead. Germany saw its southern flank potentially exposed just as it was preparing Operation Barbarossa, the invasion of the Soviet Union. Germany planned the invasion of Yugoslavia (Directive No. 25) to compel it to remain part of the Axis. Hitler used Hungary's membership in the Tripartite Pact to demand that Hungary join in. Döme Sztójay, the Hungarian ambassador to Germany, was sent home by air with a message for Horthy:

Yugoslavia will be annihilated, for she has just renounced publicly the policy of understanding with the Axis. The greater part of the German armed forces must pass through Hungary but the principal attack will not be made on the Hungarian sector. Here the Hungarian Army should intervene, and, in return for its co-operation, Hungary will be able to reoccupy all those former territories which she had been forced at one time to cede to Yugoslavia. The matter is urgent. An immediate and affirmative reply is requested.

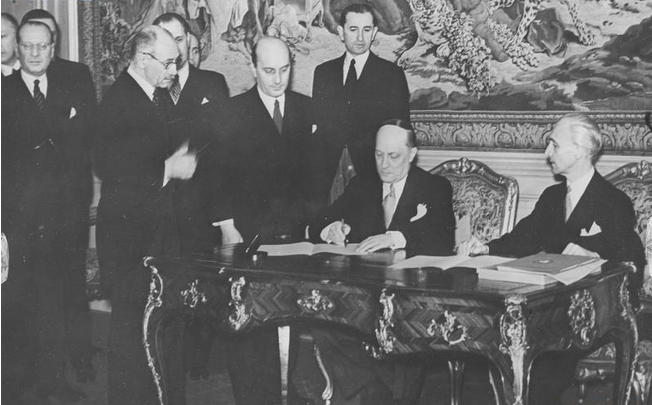
The Teleki Government signs the Treaty of Eternal Friendship with Yugoslavia

Teleki had signed a non-aggression pact, the Treaty of Eternal Friendship, with Yugoslavia on 12 December 1940, only five months earlier, and would not assent to assisting with the invasion. At the meeting in the Royal Castle, where Sztójay presented Hitler's letter to Horthy, the regent was overjoyed and accepted the offer immediately. Teleki felt as a Hungarian gentleman that Hungary could not attack a nation it had just signed a treaty of eternal friendship with. He stayed up late in an lengthy attempt to persuade Horthy to not join the planned invasion, and eventually the regent agreed that he would think more about what to do. In the debates in the Council of Ministers, Bartha-supported by Werth who was allowed to attend the meetings of the council despite not being a minister-argued that here was an unprecedented chance to take back of the lands lost to Yugoslavia, and urged Horthy to pass up this opportunity. Against Teleki, Bartha claimed that Hungary could had annexed all of Slovakia if only it had been more pro-German during the Sudetenland crisis in 1938 and stated that this "mistake" must be repeated again. Bartha sought to pressure Horthy into choosing the invasion by saying that the morale of the honved would be destroyed if Hungary did not take this opportunity as the defense minister asserted that the vast majority of the honved wanted a war. Teleki's government chose a middle ground, opting to remain out of the German-Yugoslav conflict unless either Hungarian minorities were in danger or Yugoslavia collapsed. Teleki relayed his government's position to London and sought allowance for Hungary's difficult position. Teleki had learned at the end of March 1941 that his wife who was had been hospitalised for cancer was now terminally ill and had only a few months to live. In addition, Teleki's beloved mother was also dying. As a result of both personal and political crises in his life, Teleki been suffering from insomnia and depression. However, Teleki was a devout Roman Catholic who attended Mass regularly, and few people who knew him took seriously his references to ending his life, believing that his suicidal talk about shooting himself in the head was to be taken metaphorically instead of literally.

On 3 April 1941, Teleki received a telegram from György Barcza, the Hungarian minister in London that British Foreign Secretary Anthony Eden had threatened to break diplomatic relations with Hungary if it did not actively resist the passage of German troops across its territory and to declare war if it attacked Yugoslavia. Barcza added that both Eden and the prime minister Winston Churchill were furious about the prospect of Hungary giving Germany transit rights to invade Yugoslavia. Barcza ended his telegram that Hungarian motives "will hardly be understood here and if either of the mentioned exigencies arise the whole Anglo-American world will charge us with breach of treaty and possibly with attacking our new friends in the rear". The foreign minister László Bárdossy made light of Barcza'a cable, but Teleki was extremely upset as he cried out "I have done all I could! I cannot do any more!" Unknown to Teleki, Werth acting on his authority had opened staff talks with General Friedrich Paulus, the deputy chief of the German general staff, for an invasion of Yugoslavia.

Teleki's enduring desire was to keep Hungary non-aligned but he could not ignore Nazi Germany's dominant influence. Teleki was now faced with two bad choices. He could continue to resist Germany's demands for its help in the invasion of Yugoslavia although he knew that would likely mean that after Germany conquered Yugoslavia, it would next turn its attention to Hungary, as had happened to Austria, Czechoslovakia and Poland. He could allow German troops to cross Hungarian territory even though it would betray Yugoslavia and lead the Allies to declare war on Hungary. Horthy, who had resisted Germany's pressure, agreed to Germany's demands. Teleki met with the cabinet council that evening. He complained that Horthy had "told me thirty-four times that he would never make war for foreign interests, and now he has changed his mind".

Before Teleki could chart a course through the political thicket, the decision was torn from him by General Henrik Werth, the chief of the Hungarian General Staff. Without the sanction of the Hungarian government, Werth, of German origin, made private arrangements with the German High Command for the transport of the German troops across Hungary. Teleki denounced Werth's action as treason. At the meeting of the Crown Council, Teleki was unable to reverse Werth's promise to allow the German forces transit rights across Hungary, but was able to persuade Horthy not to order a general mobilisation, which ruled out Hungary taking part in the invasion. As Hungary was a mostly rural nation, most of the reservists in the Honved were farmers and in April 1941, there were serious floods in the Hungarian countryside. Teleki argued that Werth's plans for a general mobilisation threatened the 1941 crop as calling up some many farmers serving as reservists would an end to the effort to cope with the floods caused by the heavy rains that spring. The meeting of the Council of Ministers decided to accept the fait accompli imposed by Werth and for a limited Hungarian role in the invasion of Yugoslavia, a decision that Teleki was strongly opposed to.

=== Germany enters Hungary, Teleki commits suicide ===
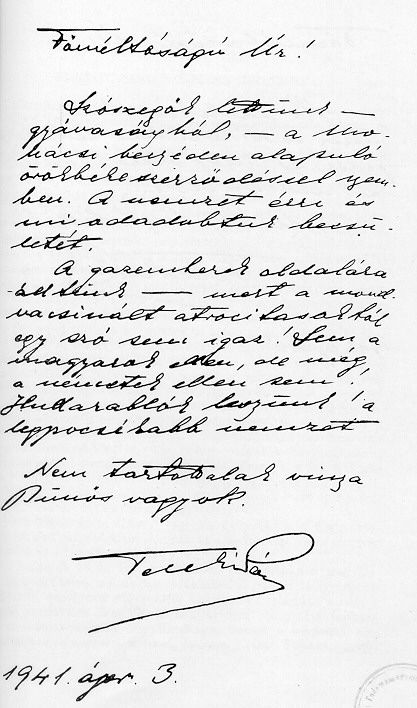
Suicide letter of Pál Teleki

Shortly after 9:00 p.m., he left the Hungarian Ministry of Foreign Affairs for his apartment in the Sándor Palace. At around midnight, he received a call that is thought to have informed him that the German army had just started its march into Hungary. Teleki committed suicide with a pistol during the night of 3 April 1941 and was found the next morning. His suicide note said in part:

"We broke our word, – out of cowardice [...] The nation feels it, and we have thrown away its honor. We have allied ourselves to scoundrels [...] We will become body-snatchers! A nation of trash. I did not hold you back. I am guilty."

Winston Churchill later wrote, "His suicide was a sacrifice to absolve himself and his people from guilt in the German attack on Yugoslavia." On 6 April 1941, Germany launched Operation Punishment (Unternehmen Strafgericht), the bombing of Belgrade, Yugoslavia. Some historians consider Teleki's suicide an act of patriotism. Britain shortly afterward broke diplomatic relations but did not declare war until December.

Befitting his commitment to Scouting and to Hungary, Teleki was buried at Gödöllő, the location of the Royal Palace.

== Legacy ==
=== From Philosemitism to antisemitism ===
Teleki is considered "one of the most consistently unaccommodating anti-Semitic politicians of the post-Trianon period". His attitude towards Jews parallels the changing demographic and social situation in Hungary before and after World War I. In the Austro-Hungarian empire the generally fiercely patriotic Hungarian Jews were securing the tenuous Hungarian majority in the Hungarian kingdom. Consequently, Teleki stated at the peace conference of 1919 that "the majority of the Hungarian Jews have completely assimilated to the Hungarians [...] from a social point of view, the Hungarian Jews are not Jews any more but Hungarians." After 1920, with a greatly reduced Hungarian territory, Teleki changed his mind about the Hungarian Jews: he regarded the Jews as a "problem of life and death for the Hungarian people". After Regent Horthy appointed Teleki Prime Minister on 19 July 1920 he introduced the first antisemitic laws introduced in Europe after the First World War, the so-called "Numerus clausus Act" of 22 September 1920 which allowed Jews to attend universities only in a direct relation to their proportion of the Hungarian population. He and his government resigned less than a year later on 14 April 1921 when the former king, Karl IV, attempted to retake Hungary's throne.

From 1921 until 1938, Teleki was a professor at Budapest University. While there, journalists asked him what he thought about the anti-Jewish violence that had occurred on the university campus. He replied: "This din does not bother me. In any case, the students take examinations that test their knowledge of the sea and this din is aptly suited to that of the sea."

Due to the feudal nature of pre-War Hungarian society, where both rich and impoverished aristocrats tried to maintain an "aristocratic" life style and a disadvantaged peasant class had no means of learning and social mobility, the Hungarian Jews constituted a disproportionally large part of the Hungarian middle class. In the 1930 census, Jews comprised 5.1% of the population, but among physicians 54.5 percent were Jewish, journalists 31.7%, and lawyers 49.2%. Persons of Jewish faith controlled four of the five major banks, from 19.5 to 33% of the national income, and around 80 percent of the country's industry. Already after the short lived Hungarian Soviet Republic (21 March – 1 August 1919), whose leaders, concomitantly with their middle class origins, were often of Jewish parentage, and even more after the worldwide depression struck in the late 1920s and early 1930s, which conversely was associated with Jewish wealth and financial power, the country's Jews were made scapegoats for all of Hungary's economic, political and social plights.

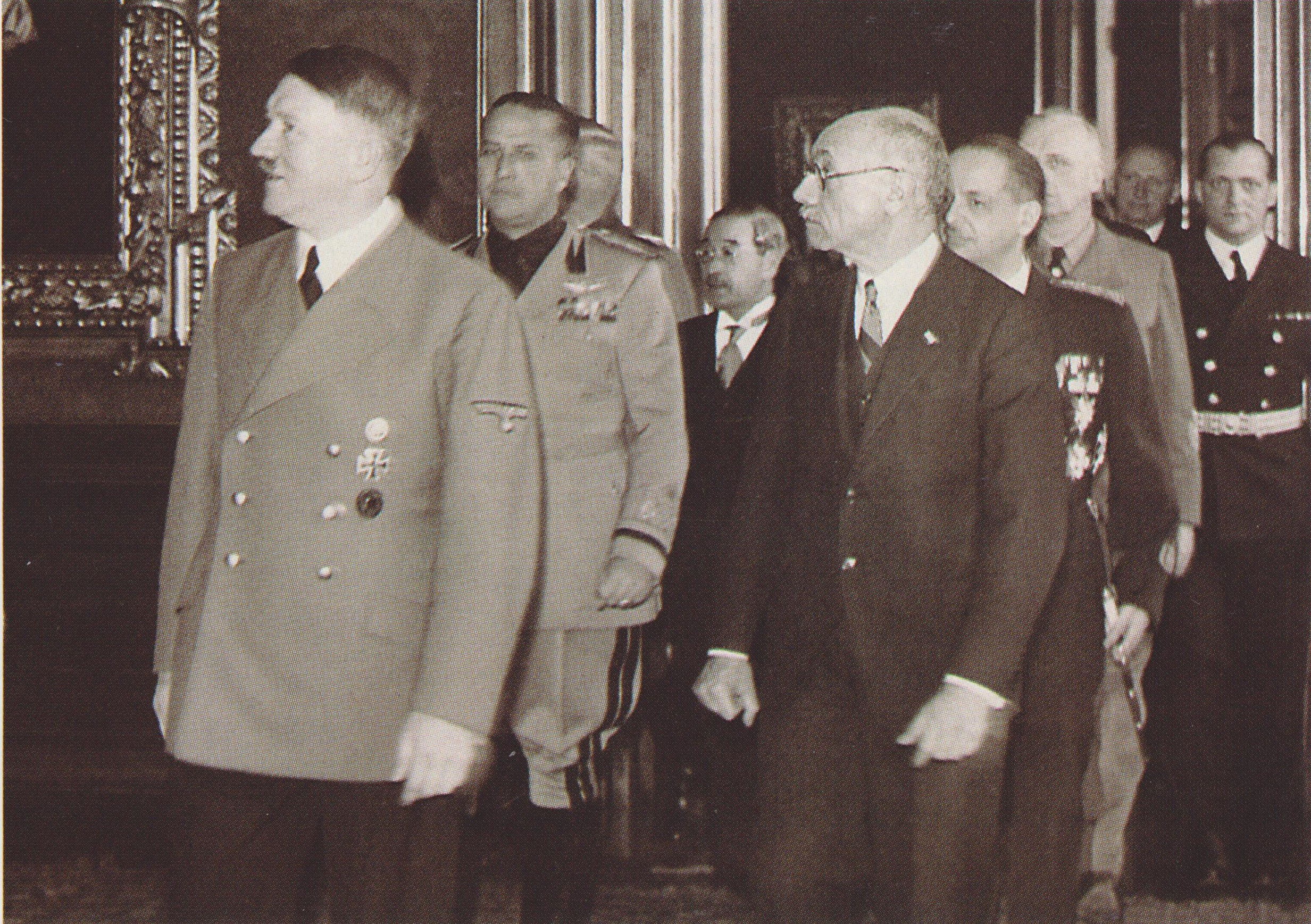
Pál Teleki with Adolf Hitler, when Hungary joined the Tripartite Pact on 20 November 1940

After a period of considerable economic turbulence and a general political turn to the far right, Teleki became Prime Minister once again on 16 February 1939. Although considered an Anglophile, one of the first things he did in Parliament was to push the Second Anti-Jewish act initiated by his predecessor Béla Imrédy. This was the first law which defined the term "Jew" in explicitly racial terms: "A person belonging to the Jewish denomination is at the same time a member of the Jewish racial community and it is natural that the cessation of membership in the Jewish denomination does not result in any change in that person’s association with the racial community." It forbade Jews to hold any government position, to be editors, publishers, producers or directors. It restated and reinforced the Numerus Clausus act of 1920 and extended its provisions (representation according to proportion of population) to the business world, regulating even the number of Jewish employees (one in five or two in nine maximum, depending on the size). These laws would affect up to 825,000 Jews, who lived in territory reacquired by Hungary in 1941.

Teleki promulgated Law No. II relating to national defense, on 11 March 1939, and signed it into law on 12 May of the same year. The text of the bill stipulated that all young Jewish men of arms-bearing age join forced-labor service. In 1940, this compulsory service was extended to all able-bodied male Jews. As a result of the laws established during Teleki's tenure, 15,000–35,000 Jews in the re-acquired part of Czechoslovakia, who had difficulty in proving their former Hungarian citizenship, were deported.

These Jews, without Hungarian citizenship, were sent to a location near Kamenets-Podolski, where in one of the first acts of mass killing during World War II, all but two thousand of these individuals were executed by the Nazi Einsatzgruppe (mobile killing unit).

Teleki wrote the preamble to the Second Anti-Jewish Law (1939) and prepared the Third Anti-Jewish Law in 1940. He also signed 52 anti-Jewish decrees during his rule, and members of his government issued 56 further decrees against Jews.

Teleki devoted a great deal of energy and political savvy to the passage of the second anti-Jewish bill, stating that he pushed it not for tactical reasons but because of his deep personal convictions. During Teleki's second term in 1940, Hungarian Arrow Cross leader Ferenc Szálasi was given amnesty, and the Nazi movement became stronger.

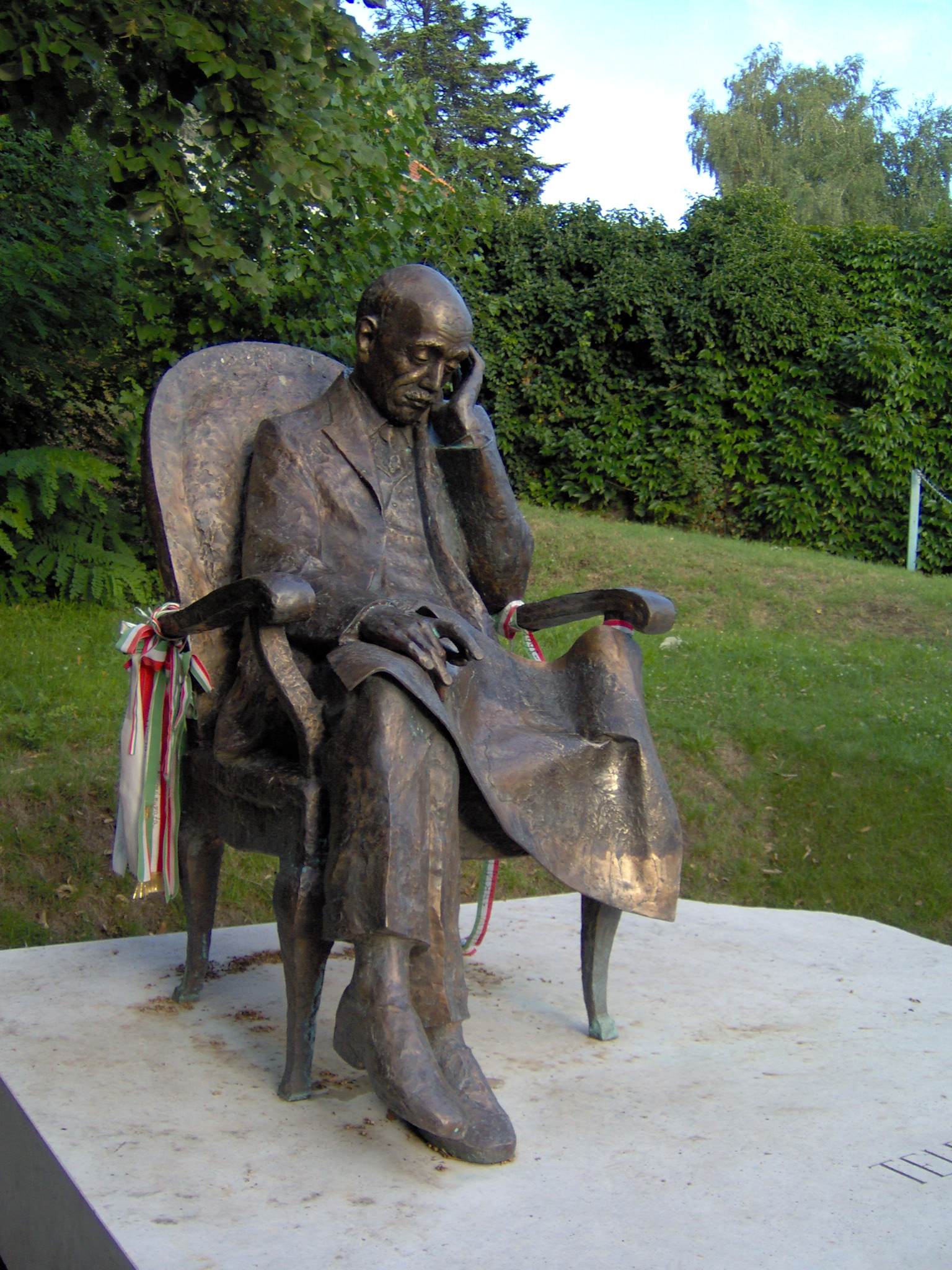
Statue of Pál Teleki in Balatonboglár, Hungary

Although the laws of the Labor Service System were put in effect during Teleki's lifetime, they were radically enforced only after Hungary had entered the war. Then the situation of the Jewish forced laborers, which were organized in labor battalions, commanded by Hungarian military officers, became dire. They were engaged in war-related construction, often subject to extreme cold, and given inadequate shelter, food, and medical care. At least 27,000 Jewish forced laborers died before Germany occupied Hungary in March 1944, after which the Hungarian state authorities in close cooperation with the German "Sonderkommando" of Adolf Eichmann rapidly organized and implemented the mass deportation of Jews to the death camps.

While it is true that tens of thousands of young Hungarians were conscripted into military service at the same time and sent to fight on the Eastern Front against the Soviet Union, often ill-equipped and badly trained, and bore the brunt of the miseries of the German defeat, the Hungarian participation in the Eastern campaign was voluntary, and the suffering of its soldiers was war induced and not deliberately inflicted as with the Jewish labor battalions.

=== Statue controversy ===
In 2004, the Teleki Pál Memorial Committee, initially supported by Budapest mayor Gábor Demszky, proposed erecting a statue by Tibor Rieger in his honor on the 63rd anniversary of his death in front of the palace on Castle Hill where he governed and, finally, committed suicide. Because of his close connection with Hungarian anti-Semitism there was a strong opposition both by Hungarian liberals and Hungarian and international Jewish organizations, especially the Simon Wiesenthal Center and its leader Efraim Zuroff. Consequently, the mayor withdrew his support and the Minister of Culture István Hiller canceled the plans. On 5 April 2004, the statue was finally placed in the courtyard of the Catholic Church in the town of Balatonboglár on the shore of Lake Balaton. Balatonboglár had during World War II been host to thousands of Polish refugees who opened in that town one of only two secondary schools for Poles in Europe during 1939–1944. They credited Teleki with opening Hungary's borders to them and named a street in Warsaw for him after the war ended. In 2001 he was posthumously awarded Commander's Cross with Star of the Order of Merit of the Republic of Poland. In 2020 Teleki earned two monuments in Poland, one in Skierniewice and one in Kraków, both related to his pro-Polish stand during the Polish-Soviet war of 1920.

A street in Borča, a suburb of the Serbian capital Belgrade, was named "Ulica Pala Telekija" ("Pal Teleki Street") in 2011.

A statue honoring Teleki was supposed to be placed in Serbian city of Novi Sad.

== See also ==
- László Almásy
- Hungarian Turanism
- Hungary–Yugoslavia relations

== Books and articles ==
- Bodo, Bela (October 2010). "Hungarian Aristocracy and the White Terror". Journal of Contemporary History. 45 (4): 703–724. doi:10.1177/0022009410375255.
- Cornelius, Deborah S. (2011). Hungary in World War II Caught in the Cauldron. New York: Fordham University Press. ISBN 9780823237739.
- Sakmyster, Thomas L (January 1975). "Army Officers and Foreign Policy in Interwar Hungary, 1918-41". Journal of Contemporary History. 1- (1): 19–40. doi:10.1177/002200947501000102.

Political offices
Preceded by post created	Minister of Religion and Education; Counter-revolutionary Government; 1919	Succeeded by Károly Huszár
Preceded by Sándor Simonyi-Semadam	Minister of Foreign Affairs; 1920	Succeeded by Imre Csáky
Preceded by Sándor Simonyi-Semadam	Prime Minister of Hungary; 1920–1921	Succeeded by István Bethlen
Preceded by Imre Csáky	Minister of Foreign Affairs; Acting; 1920–1921	Succeeded by Gusztáv Gratz
Preceded by Gusztáv Gratz	Minister of Foreign Affairs; Acting; 1921	Succeeded by Miklós Bánffy
Preceded by Bálint Hóman	Minister of Religion and Education; 1938–1939	Succeeded by Bálint Hóman
Preceded by Béla Imrédy	Prime Minister of Hungary; 1939–1941	Succeeded by Ferenc Keresztes-Fischer; Acting
Preceded by István Csáky	Minister of Foreign Affairs; Acting; 1940–1941	Succeeded by László Bárdossy
