= Géza Teleki (politician) =

Hungarian politician

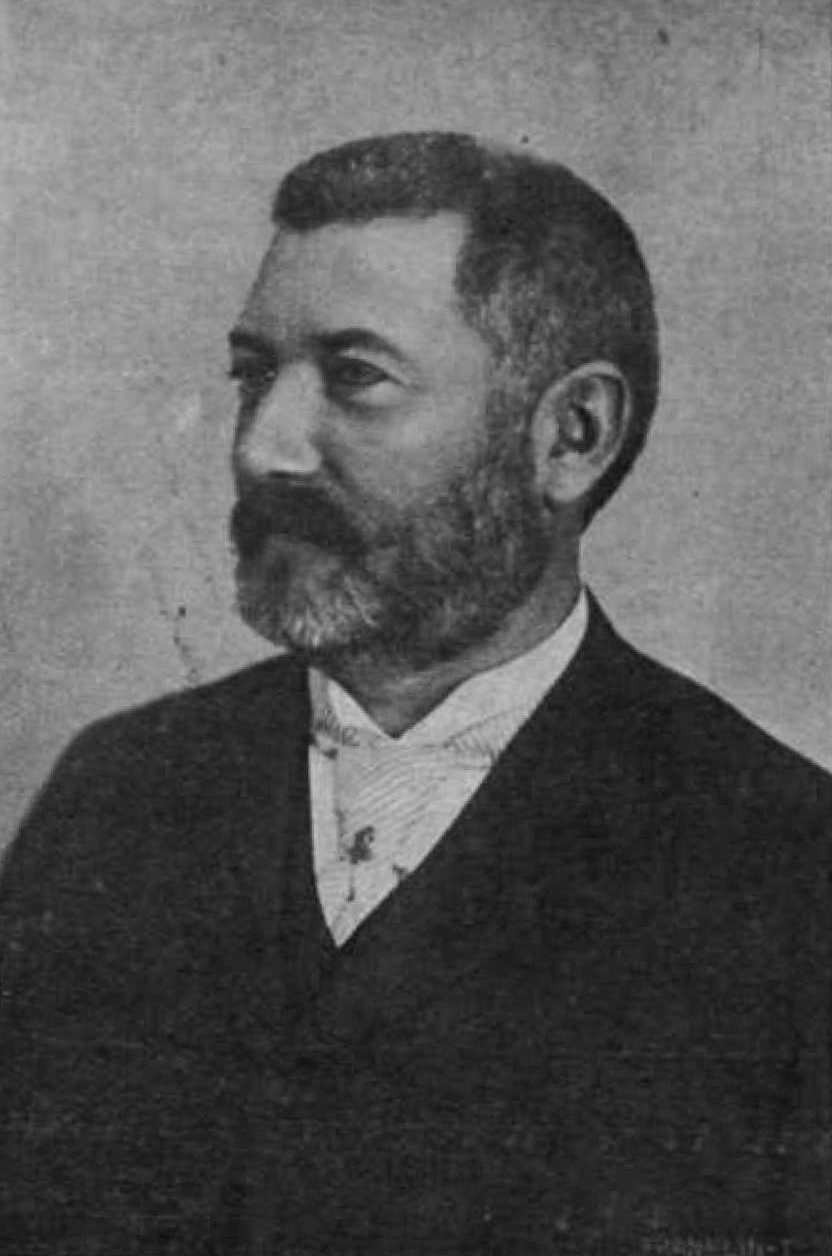

Minister of the Interior of Hungary
- In office 16 June 1889 – 15 March 1890
- Preceded by: Gábor Baross
- Succeeded by: Gyula Szapáry

Personal details
- Born: 28 September 1843 Dés, Hungary
- Died: 27 September 1913 (aged 69) Budapest, Hungary
- Party: Liberal Party
- Profession: Politician

Count Géza Teleki de Szék (28 September 1843 – 27 September 1913) was a Hungarian politician, who served as Interior Minister between 1889 and 1890. His son was Pál Teleki, who became Prime Minister during the first half of the Second World War.

Political offices
| Preceded by Gábor Baross | Minister of the Interior; 1889–1890 | Succeeded by Gyula Szapáry |
