= Bombing of Kassa =

1941 airstrike in Hungary (today Košice, Slovakia)

Coordinates: 48°43′19″N 21°15′02″E

- Part of World War II
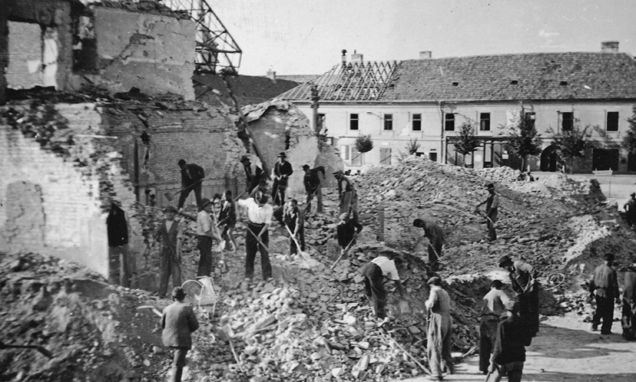
- Bombing of Košice – clearing the rubble
Date	26 June 1941
Location	Kassa, Hungary
Result	Hungary declares war on the Soviet Union

Belligerents
Disputed: Soviet Union; (Nazi Germany) Germany	(Kingdom of Hungary (1920–1946)) Hungary

Strength
Disputed: 3 Heinkel He 111 aircraft; 3 Ilyushin DB-3 aircraft	N/A

Casualties and losses
	29 killed

The bombing of Kassa took place on 26 June 1941, when still unidentified aircraft conducted an airstrike on the city of Kassa, then part of Hungary, today Košice in Slovakia. This attack became the pretext for the government of Hungary to declare war on the Soviet Union the next day, 27 June.

== Attack ==
On 22 June 1941, Germany invaded the Soviet Union. Unlike Finland and Romania, Hungary was not asked to take part in Operation Operation Barbarossa and was allowed to remain neutral. Adolf Hitler did not want Hungary to join Operation Barbarossa in part because of Hungary's backwardness led him to believe that the Honved (Royal Hungarian Army) would be a net liability rather than an asset on the Eastern Front and in part because Hungary was a troublesome ally that kept making territorial claims against other German allies such as Romania and Slovakia. Hitler believed that if Hungary did take part in the war on the Eastern Front, they would demand to annex southern Transylvania and all of Slovakia as the reward. The most committed voice in Budapest urging Hungary to take part in Operation Barbarossa was General Henrik Werth, the chief of the Hungarian General Staff, who was strongly supported by the Defense minister, General Károly Bartha. Werth had already in May 1941 had the General Staff draw up plans for "offensive-minded defense" against the Soviet Union. Werth's primary reason for wanting to join the war was his belief expressed in a memo that he wrote that Hitler would reward Hungary for being "loyal" to Germany and that Hungary would "certainly recover the entire territory of historical Hungary" (i.e. the all the lands lost under the treaty of Trianon) by being "loyal".

On 23 June 1941, the Soviet Foreign Commissar Vyacheslav Molotov had a meeting with József Kristóffy, the Hungarian minister-plenipotentiary in Moscow, to tell him that the Soviet Union "...has no demands or hostile intent towards Hungary, has had no objection to Hungarian demands being realized at Romania’s expense, and in the future will have no objection in this regard either." Essentially, Molotov was saying that the Soviet Union would support Hungary's claim to southern Transylvania, which had remained Romanian under the Second Vienna Award, in exchange for Hungary remaining neutral. The fact that Romania under Ion Antonescu had joined Operation Barbarossa right from the beginning made Soviet diplomacy very hostile towards Romania after 22 June 1941. On the same day, the prime minister László Bárdossy called for a meeting of the council of ministers. At that meeting, Bartha advocated declaring war on the Soviet Union and told the council of ministers: "I think that having defeated the Poles in three weeks, having finished off the French in about as much time, and having beaten the Yugoslav Army in twelve days and occupied the entire Balkans in three weeks, in six weeks the Germans will be in Moscow and completely defeat Russia". The picture painted by Bartha and Werth was that entering the war would be a low risk endeavour as they stated that the war would not last long and that Hungarian losses would be extremely low. By contrast, Werth and Bartha argued that the rewards for entering the war would very great as they predicated that Hitler would reward Hungary for declaring war on the Soviet Union by restoring all of the Lands of the Crown of St. István and all of the territory Hungary had lost under the Treaty of Trianon would be returned. Bárdossy rejected Bartha's advice to enter the war, but he did decide to break diplomatic relations with the Soviet Union. With the exception of the Interior Minister Ferenc Keresztes-Fischer, every minister supported Bárdossy's decision. Bárdossy did not inform the council of Kristóffy's telegram saying that the Soviet Union would support Hungary's claims against Romania in exchange for staying neutral, which could be used as a reason for continuing to be neutral.

On 26 June 1941, four days after Germany attacked the Soviet Union in violation of the Molotov–Ribbentrop non-aggression treaty as a part of Operation Barbarossa, three unidentified planes bombed the city, killing and wounding over a dozen people and causing minor material damage. Numerous buildings were hit, including the local post and telegraph office. The bombers seemed to have been aiming at the local artillery barracks for the Honved, but most of the bombs hit the post office and the houses around the barracks. By the time the Royal Hungarian Air Force had been able to send up some fighters, the bombers had already disappeared into the clouds. The news of the bombing reached Budapest at 1: 45 pm along with reports that some of the bomb fragments had writing in Russian. In the "intelligence register" of the General Staff concerning the bombing was added the unsigned statement that was in a different handwriting than the original statement that said: "Accordingly to a report coming in subsequently the attacking planes were Russian planes painted yellow". Upon receiving the news, Werth wasted no time in heading over to the Royal Castle along with Bartha to ask Horthy to declare war.

After received the reports of the bombing of Kassa on the morning of 26 June 1941, on the afternoon of the same day Bartha and Werth went to see the Regent of Hungary, Admiral Miklós Horthy at the Royal Castle at about 2: 00 pm. Both Bartha and Werth were categorical in insisting that the Soviet Union had bombed Kassa and demanded an immediate declaration of war, using highly emotional language as they claimed that Hungarian "honor" had been insulted and only a declaration of war could properly avenge this insult. The Hungarian historian Nandor Dreisziger wrote that Horthy was an impulsive man much given to rash decisions as he was prone to acting without fully thinking about the consequences of his actions, and that the regent needed someone like the former prime minister István Bethlen to advise him. Bethlen played the voice of reason and calm who persuaded Horthy not to go ahead with his more reckless plans to attack one of Hungary's neighbors (which was usually Romania as Horthy resented the loss of Transylvania very strongly), as he did numerous times during his time as prime minister between 1921-1931. The American historian Deborah Cornelius wrote about the regent's character that Horthy was "accustomed to command" owing to his lengthy service as an officer in the Imperial Austrian and Royal Hungarian Navy; as a sailor had visited every continent except for North America; noted that besides for his native Magyar, he was fluent in English, French, German, Italian and Serbo-Croat; was familiar with the court life as he served as the naval aide-de-camp to the King-Emperor Franz Josef; was dignified in his manner and been a very brave admiral to the point of recklessness in World War One as he seemingly had no fear of death. However she noted that: "Horthy was no diplomat and understood little about politics. Impulsive and prone to hasty decisions he was easily swayed by the last person he had spoken with. He followed the code of honor of a nineteenth century gentleman, was conservative, rabidly anti-Bolshevik and was overconfident in the abilities of his military leaders". On more negative note, American diplomats who served in Budapest usually characterized Horthy as "a honorable but stupid man" and "an old seadog on horseback", noting that Horthy did not really understand any of the issues facing his country and had fundamentally militaristic mindset, regarding all problems as being capable of being solved with a gun. Bethlen, Horthy's favorite adviser, was considered to be a restraining influence on the admiral during the interwar era as Bethlen was regarded as far more intelligent than Horthy and as someone who understood the problems facing Hungary.

The account of the bombing of Kassa given to Horthy by Werth and Bartha had pushed Horthy into a state of high excitement, but this time Bethlen was not present with his place occupied by Bárdossy who did nothing to argue against Bartha and Werth, and instead encouraged them. Horthy was greatly angered by the news of the bombing, which he saw as an act of unprovoked Soviet aggression and seems to have believed the claims of Bartha and Werth that the bombing was the prelude to a Soviet invasion of Hungary. Dreisziger argued that if Bethlen still been serving as prime minister in 1941 instead of Bárdossy, he might had been able to talk Horthy out of going to war against the Soviet Union. Bethlen had in fact written Horthy a letter advising him against declaring war on the Soviet Union, saying the bombing of Kassa was probably an accident, which Horthy did not read until after Bárdossy declared war. Bethlen wrote that he did not share the blind faith in a Nazi "final victory" that other Hungarian decision-makers that Bárdossy, Werth and Bartha had, and wrote that it was not inevitable that Germany would defeat the Soviet Union. Bethlen also added that based on his sources that the Honved was not ready for a major war and predicated Hungarian losses on the Eastern Front would be very heavy. Finally, Bethlen predicated that the war against Soviet Union would be unpopular and Hungary had no duty to defeat the Soviet Union "by sacrificing the flower of her people". In 1944, Bethlen wrote about the decision to declare war on the Soviet Union "the gullible Hungarian public was made to believe this by propaganda meant to trick us into the war by painting the bogey of Bolshevism on the wall". Horthy gave orders that the Royal Hungarian Air Force should start bombing targets in the Soviet Union immediately while telling Bárdossy to issue a declaration of war. Horthy was later to claim that he did not want to declare war and that Bárdossy exceeded his authority in declaring war as he maintained that just merely wanted to strike back via air strikes on Soviet targets to avenge the bombing of Kassa. The Royal Hungarian Air Force bombed the Soviet town of Stanyslaviv (modern Ivano-Frankivsk, Ukraine) at dawn on 27 June, a few hours before Bárdossy declared war.

At the meeting of the council of ministers, every minister except for Keresztes-Fischer supported Bárdossy's demand for a declaration of war. The two ministers who spoke most loudly for war were Bartha and Bárdossy. Keresztes-Fischer stated that they should be no declaration of war unless Germany requested it (which he knew would not occur). But with the rest of the council of ministers voting for war, Bárdossy went on the radio at 10 am to announce that the Kingdom of Hungary was now at war without bothering to consult parliament. At 10: 30 am, Bárdossy went before the Lower House to say the country was at war. Bárdossy had acted illegally without having a vote in parliament about declaring war, but at the time he was cheered in both houses of parliament when he later appeared to announce what he had done. The prime minister was celebrated as the man of the hour with the assembled MPs greeting Bárdossy's announcement that he just declared war without asking for their votes with rapturous cheering. After World War One, the Honved had explained away the defeat of 1918 in the precise same way that the German Army had by claiming that they actually won World War One and that the defeat was due to being "stabbed-in-the-back" by the Jews. Accordingly, much of the debate in the Lower House after Bárdossy had announced that Hungary was at war was taken up with the question about whatever Hungary needed another anti-Jewish law or the first two anti-Jewish laws of 1938 and 1939 were sufficient. The MPs of the Social Democratic Party on the left and the Smallholder Party on the right were the only MPs who spoke against Bárdossy's declaration of war. However, owning to the way that most Hungarians were disenfranchised because their income levels was not high enough to allow them to vote, neither the Social Democrats and the Smallholders had as many seats as their share of the vote would suggest. The handful of Socialist and Smallholder MPs walked out in protest against Bárdossy's speech, leading to the MPs from the Arrow Cross Party to shout "out with Social Democrats!" Antal Ullein-Reviczky, the chief of the Press Division at the Ministry of Foreign Affairs, wrote that Bárdossy was not keen to bring Hungary into the war and recorded him as saying to him in his diary: "Since the chief of the General Staff, evidently in agreement with the Germans, has determined that it was the Russians, and since the regent also believes it, it was them and that’s final! Because our soldiers, in league with the Germans, are determined that nothing will deter them from drawing us into the war, as is obviously the case, we will be unable to avoid it, especially taking into consideration that Romania has become a belligerent".

Later on the afternoon of June 27, the Honved crossed the border into the Soviet Union and engaged in a firefight with the Soviet border guards. However, it was not until 1 July 1941 that the Carpathian Group of the Honved that consisted of 60, 000 men were able to enter the Soviet Union, which marked the beginning of sustained fighting for the Honved in the war. As Bethlen had predicated, the war was unpopular with ordinary Hungarians, all the more so because most of them were disenfranchised because they were poor and thus had were not allowed to elect their leaders. General Géza Lakatos wrote that the soldiers under his command "headed off to war with no great enthusiasm." The commanding officer of one of the divisions sent to the Eastern Front in the summer of 1941 complained that neither the bombing of Kassa nor appeals for a "crusade against Bolshevism" was capable of motiving his men to fight as the vast majority of his soldiers came either from urban working class or the rural peasants, and for both groups "either could not or did not want to understand the war’s aim".

== Aftermath ==
Hours after the attack, the Hungarian cabinet "passed a resolution calling for the declaration of the existence of a state of war between Hungary and the USSR." The local military investigators at the time believed that the attackers were Soviet, but the true identity of the attacking nation has never been established. The official explanation preferred by Soviet historians was the idea of a false flag attack by Germany to provoke Hungary into attacking the Soviet Union, employing Soviet planes captured on conquered airfields. The official version presented in Hungary in 1941 was that the Soviet Union had just committed an act of aggression by bombing Kassa and as such the war against the Soviet Union was a defensive struggle on the part of Hungary.

The Hungarian historian Ignac Romsics pointed out that there were "a number of holes" in the Hungarian official version as it did not serve the Soviet interests to increase their number of enemies in wartime. Romsics also noted that Molotov's offer to Kristóffy on 23 June to have the Soviet Union support Hungary's claims against Romania for southern Transylvania in exchange for Hungarian neutrality is not compatible with the theory that the Soviet Union would just a few days on 26 June commit an act of aggression designed to bring Hungary into the war against the Soviet Union. Finally, Romsics noted that the TASS statement announcing that Hungary had just declared war on the Soviet Union on 27 June was surprisingly sympathetic towards Hungary. Romsics argued that the way which TASS presented the Hungarian declaration of war not support the thesis that the Soviet Union was intent upon a war of conquest against Hungary in June 1941 as the Hungarian government claimed after declaring war.

== Other possibilities ==
Another possibility is that the Soviet bombers mistook Kassa for a nearby city in the First Slovak Republic, which was already at war with the Soviet Union. Captain Ádám Krúdy, the commander of the Kassa military airfield, identified the attackers as German Heinkel He 111 bombers in his official report but was ordered to keep silent about it. However, Krúdy's written report has not been found. Another problem with the German conspiracy theory was the fact that German planes did not have bomb racks capable of holding Soviet bombs. According to Dreisziger, "it seems that the bombs dropped on Kassa were 100 kg bombs while the standard stock of the Luftwaffe were the 50 and 250 kg bombs."

The fact that the attacking aircraft could not be identified by most witnesses (including trained pilots and anti-aircraft gunners) also rules out the use of German types as these personnel and even the local civilian population were familiar to their sound and silhouette. Some speculated that the attack was carried out by the Germans with an early and rare single-tail version of the PZL.37 Łoś bombers captured in the 1939 Polish campaign – but their weak engines probably prevented them from carrying the amount of bomb load that experts believe was necessary based on surveys of the damage. During the Nuremberg trials, the USSR brought forth a statement allegedly taken from Hungarian Major General István Újszászy, who headed Hungarian military intelligence between 1939 and 1942. According to the testimony, "the Kassa 'plot' was hatched by German and Hungarian officers and carried out by 'German planes with Russian markings'." This theory was introduced because he found that, following the Kassa bombings, certain officers behaved suspiciously, not due to concrete evidence. The reliability of his testimony was devalued due to the nature of his interrogation, which may have been under duress.

== Theories ==
In his memoirs, Admiral Miklós Horthy, Hungary's head of state in the interwar period, stated that Hungary's entry into World War II had been provoked by the "staged" bombing of Kassa carried out by German pilots. He also accused General Henrik Werth, the Hungarian Chief of Staff, of being a part of the conspiracy. The major flaw in the German false flag theory is the weakness of the motive. On the fourth or fifth day of Operation Barbarossa, the Germans had no need for Hungarian support, as their own mechanised troops were pushing inland towards the Soviet Union at a high pace with minimal resistance. In addition, the Germans could have quickly used political pressure to persuade the divided Hungarian leadership to join the campaign. Furthermore, Hitler and his generals had only expected Finnish and Romanian troops (because they were on the flanks) from the very beginning of the planning of the operation, and did not count on Hungarian troops, because of their shortage of equipment and because Hitler distrusted the Hungarian leadership. Furthermore, Hitler feared it might make further territorial claims to regain further territories lost in the Treaty of Trianon.

The British historian C.A. Macartney believed that the bombing was the work of Czechoslovak pilots based in the Soviet Union. In particular, Macartney believed that the bombing was the work of Lieutenant Ondėj Andele, a pilot in the Czechoslovak Air Force who had defected to the Soviet Union in 1939 and was angry at Hungary for annexing parts of his homeland. Bethlen in his memorandum of 1944 accused "Czech airplanes" based in the Soviet Union as being responsible for the bombing. Bethlen believed that Czechoslovak government-in-exile based in London and headed by Edvard Beneš had a vested interest in bringing Hungary into the war as the best way to recover the lands that Hungary had annexed in 1938-1939. Another theory was the bombing was the work of a Slovak Air Force bomber squadron that was either defecting to the Soviet Union or had been sent on a mission to bomb the Soviet Union. The fact that Hungary had annexed parts of Slovakia in the First Vienna Award of November 1938 along with another part annexed in the Little War of 1939 led to intense anti-Hungarian feelings in Slovakia, which led to the theory that it was Slovak planes that bombed Kassa out a desire for revenge for annexing land that Slovaks considered to be a part of their homeland.

The American historian Thomas Sakmyster wrote that the bombing of Kassa was remarkably similar to a General Staff plan for a bombing of a small town in Hungary devised by Lieutenant Colonel Sandor Homlok in 1938 to provide a casus belli for a war with Czechoslovakia. Under the 1938 plan, Royal Hungarian Air Force warplanes were to be painted with the Czechoslovak Air Force colors and bomb some provincial town in Hungary with bombs labelled in Czech. During the Sudetenland crisis, the extremely hawkish General Staff was all for having Hungary join Germany in attacking Czechoslovakia and were openly unhappy with Horthy's decision to stay neutral in the projected war, which led Homlok to devise the plan for a false flag attack on Hungary. As was, the war that was about to break out in 1938 was ended the Munich conference of 29–30 September 1938, which settled the crisis. In 1941, the same dynamic played out with the hawkish General Staff led by Werth pressing for Hungary to join Germany in the war against the Soviet Union while Horthy hesitated. The bombing of Kassa was very similar to the sort of bombing that Homlok had wanted in 1938 with the only differences being that the bombers had no colors, the bombs found at Kassa were labelled in Russian, and Kassa was a major city Sakmyster suggested that Werth along with the rest of General Staff who had become increasing desperate and frantic to have Hungary enter the war might had activated the 1938 plan to provide the casus belli with the Soviet Union playing the same role that Czechoslovakia was supposed to have played in 1938. Sakmyster also noted that on 4 April 1941 Bartha during his visit to Berlin to see Hitler at the Reich Chancellery had asked for Luftwaffe plans to be painted with the colors of the Royal Yugoslav Air Force to bomb a Hungarian city to provide an excuse for Hungary to take part in the invasion of Yugoslavia. Sakmyster noted that Bartha's plan was remarkable similar to the bombing of Kassa. On 6 April 1941, Operation Punishment, the German invasion of Yugoslavia began. The same day, the Hungarian city of Szeged was bombed by what were apparently aircraft of the Royal Yugoslav Air Force, which Barth used as a reason for Hungary joining the invasion of Yugoslavia.

Sakmyster believed the most likely architects of the bombing were Döme Sztójay, the Hungarian Minister-Plenipotentiary in Berlin,and Colonel Sandor Homlok, the man who made the 1938 false flag attack plan who was now serving as the military attache in Berlin. Both Sztójay and Homlok were ardently pro-Nazi officers and both were insubordinate officers who acted like they were above taking orders from civilian authority. Sztójay had been a General Staff officer who had specialised in intelligence operations; had served as the military attache to Germany from 1927-1936; and been promoted up to being the minister-plenipotentiary in 1936. Homlok in particular had the reputation of being a ruthless intriguer who was quite prepared to use illegal means to obtain his goals and was openly insubordinate to civilian authority. Besides for authoring the 1938 false flag attack plan, Homlok had been the officer responsible for infiltrating the Rongyos Gárda guerrillas into Czecho-Slovakia in late 1938-early 1939. As intended, the infiltration of the Rongyos Gárda into what is now modern Slovakia led to a number of border incidents, which Homlok used as a reason for invading Czecho-Slovakia. Homlok had taken the led in organising the Rongyos Gárda attacks on his own initiative and the government in Budapest was at first not aware of what he had done. Later in 1939, the government removed Homlok from the General Staff and sent him to Berlin as the military attache. Within the Hungarian government, Homlok had an unsavory reputation as an "irresponsible adventurer" who was forever engaged in schemes to start a war in Eastern Europe. In 1941, both Sztójay and Homlok were very keen for Hungary to take part in the invasion of the Soviet Union and were open in venting their rage when the government chose not to. In turn, both Sztójay and Homlok were very close to Werth who shared their views. Werth was also very close to General Kurt Himer, the German military attache in Budapest who urged him to find a way to bring Hungary into Operation Barbarossa. Himer had told Werth "if the [Hungarian] soldiers want to participate, they should persuade their politicians". Sakmyster argued that Sztójay and Homlok, perhaps with the support and approval of Werth, had created the plan for the bombing of Kassa to bring Hungary into the war. The Hungarian historian Lóránd Dombrády in his 1986 book Hadsereg és politika Magyarországon 1938–1944 likewise accused Werth and the General Staff as being responsible for the bombing, writing: "The attack, very well and deliberately organized and precisely executed, and the active air activity witnessed around it, could hardly have been carried out without the knowledge and collaboration of the General Staff."

The theory of a Romanian attack emerged in the 1980s, when relations with the Ceaușescu regime deteriorated. Hungarian historians who supported this theory cited Bucharest's fear of a Hungarian attack as a motive, as Romanian troops, fighting on the German side, were involved in the attack on the Soviet Union from day one, as their aim was to retake Bessarabia. The absence of Romanian troops raised the possibility that Hungary, not then involved in the campaign against the Soviet Union, would go beyond the Second Vienna Award and occupy Southern Transylvania by military force. This could be prevented by a military provocation that would force Hungary to enter the war against the Soviet Union. This theory was based on the fact that the Romanian Air Force possessed a rare twin-engine, glass-nosed bomber version of the Italian Savoia-Marchetti SM.79 Sparviero, of which only 12 were produced.

This plane's appearance supposedly matched the eyewitness accounts, and the yellow markings or fuselage stripes mentioned by witnesses correspond to the Romanian Air Force's insignia of the time, which was a yellow cross. (It is worth noting, however, that none of the witnesses saw the attacking planes from closer than a kilometre away). However, this theory is contradicted by the fact that Romania had no interest in Hungarian military participation in the campaign against the Soviet Union, which initially promised rapid success, since if only Romania had sent troops, it could have been used as an argument for the return of Northern Transylvania to Romania when the borders of Europe were "redrawn" after the supposed German victory.

The most plausible explanation for the bombing was that Kassa was accidentally targeted by Soviet bombers attempting to bomb Prešov following the Slovak declaration of war against the USSR. Romsics noted that the accidental bombings of neutral nations was a common occurrence in World War Two. The Luftwaffe bombed Dublin, the capital of neutral Ireland, several times in the spring of 1941 out of the mistaken belief that it was Belfast. Likewise, in 1943-1944, the bombers of the United States Army Air Force, which had more sophisticated navigation equipment than the Soviet Air Force had in 1941, regularly bombed cites and towns in neutral Sweden and Switzerland because navigation errors led the American bomber crews to believe they were bombing German cites and towns. Romsics argued the principle difference between the bombing of Kassa vs. the other bombings of neutral cities and towns was the governments of Ireland, Sweden and Switzerland were not looking for a reason to enter the war while the government of Hungary was. Romsics wrote that was "questionable" that the bombing of Kassa was an "immediate threatening danger" as the Hungarian declaration of war stated and wrote: "Werth, Bartha, Horthy, Bárdossy and the majority of the ministers viewed it as such because they wanted to view it as such." György Barcza, the former Hungarian Minister-Plenipotentiary in London, wrote about the bombing that the Hungarian newspapers had taken this "unresolved incident inflating it into a Soviet attack" in order to bring Hungary into the war. Barcza cynically wrote about the government's reaction to the bombing: "If a government wants war at any cost, there is always a pretext to justify it, or it is easy to conjure one up, and if it does not want it, then there are extremely many logical and honorable possibilities of avoiding this in good faith".

== Bibliography ==
- Bátonyi, Gábor (1999). Britain and Central Europe, 1918-1933. Oxford: Clarendon Press. ISBN 9780191542824.
- Cornelius, Deborah S. (2011). Hungary in World War II Caught in the Cauldron. New York: Fordham University Press. ISBN 9780823237739.
- Dreisziger, Nándor F. (1972). "New Twist to an Old Riddle: The Bombing of Kassa (Košice), June 26, 1941". Journal of Modern History. 44 (2): 232–42. doi:10.1086/240751. S2CID 143124708.
- Dreisziger, Nándor F. (1977). "Contradictory Evidence Concerning Hungary's Declaration of War on the USSR in June 1941". Canadian Slavonic Papers. 19 (4): 481–88. doi:10.1080/00085006.1977.11091504.
- Dreisziger, Nándor F. (1983). "The Kassa Bombing: The Riddle of Ádám Krúdy" (PDF). Hungarian Studies Review. 10 (1): 79–97. Archived from the original (PDF) on 2023-04-17.
- Dreisziger, N.F. (2021). "Civil-Military Relations In Nazi Germany's Shadow: the Case of Hungary, 1936-1941". In Adrian Preston & Peter Dennis (ed.). Swords and Covenants Essays in Honour of the Centennial of the Royal Military College of Canada 1876–1976. London: Taylor & Francis. pp. 216–247. ISBN 9781000339062.
- Fenyő, Mario D. (1965). "The Allied Axis Armies and Stalingrad". Military Affairs. 29 (2): 57–72. doi:10.2307/1983962. JSTOR 1983962.
- Macartney, C. A. (1956–57). October Fifteenth: A History of Modern Hungary, 1929–1945. 2 vols. Edinburgh: Edinburgh University Press.
- Macartney, C. A. (1961). "Hungary's Declaration of War on the U.S.S.R. in 1941". In Sarkissian, A. O. (ed.). Studies in Diplomatic History and Historiography. London. pp. 153–65.
- Iván, Pataki; László, Rozsos; Gyula, Sárhidai (1992). Légi háború Magyarország fölött. Budapest: Zrínyi Katonai Kiadó.
- Romsics, Ignac (2017). "Hungary". In David Stahel (ed.). Joining Hitler's Crusade European Nations and the Invasion of the Soviet Union, 1941. Cambridge: Cambridge University Press. pp. 79–106. ISBN 9781316510346.
- Sakmyster, Thomas L. (1975). "Army Officers and Foreign Policy in Interwar Hungary, 1918–41". Journal of Contemporary History. 10 (1): 19–40. doi:10.1177/002200947501000102. S2CID 159569870.
- Sakmyster, Thomas L. (1983). "The Search for a Casus Belli and the Origins of the Kassa Bombing" (PDF). Hungarian Studies Review. 10 (1): 53–65. Archived from the original (PDF) on 2021-08-18.
- Wagner, Francis S. (1983). "Diplomatic Prelude to the Bombing of Kassa: Reflections and Recollections of a Former Diplomat" (PDF). Hungarian Studies Review. 10 (1): 67–78. Archived from the original (PDF) on 2021-08-18.
