= Béla Imrédy =

Prime Minister of Hungary

Vitéz Béla Imrédy de Ómoravicza
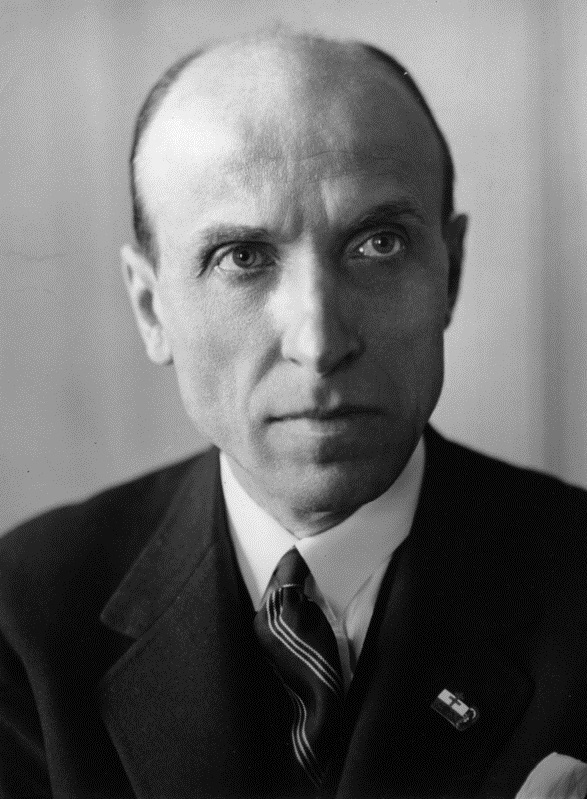
- Imrédy in 1939

Prime Minister of the Kingdom of Hungary
- In office 14 May 1938 – 16 February 1939
- Regent: Miklós Horthy
- Preceded by: Kálmán Darányi
- Succeeded by: Pál Teleki

Minister of Finance of Hungary
- In office 1 October 1932 – 6 January 1935
- Prime Minister: Gyula Gömbös
- Preceded by: Frigyes Korányi
- Succeeded by: Tihamér Fabinyi

Minister of Foreign Affairs of Hungary
- Acting
- In office 28 November 1938 – 10 December 1938
- Prime Minister: Himself
- Preceded by: Kálmán Kánya
- Succeeded by: István Csáky

Governor of the Hungarian National Bank
- In office 6 January 1935 – 14 May 1938

Personal details
- Born: 29 December 1891 Budapest, Kingdom of Hungary, Austria-Hungary
- Died: 28 February 1946 (aged 54) Budapest, Second Hungarian Republic
- Cause of death: Execution by firing squad
- Party: Unity Party, Party of Hungarian Renewal
- Spouse: Irén Nelky
- Profession: politician, economist

Béla vitéz Imrédy de Ómoravicza (Hungarian: Vitéz ómoraviczai Imrédy Béla; 29 December 1891 – 28 February 1946) was Prime Minister of Hungary from 1938 to 1939.

Born in Budapest to a Catholic family, Imrédy studied law as a young man before he started working for the Hungarian Ministry of Finance. Eventually becoming a skilled economist and financier, Imrédy was made Director of the Hungarian National Bank in 1928. In 1932, he was appointed Minister of Finance under the fascist Prime Minister Gyula Gömbös. Following his resignation in 1935, Imrédy took on the role of President of the Hungarian National Bank. A highly ambitious individual, Imrédy was recognized for his right-wing perspectives on domestic and social issues. However, in matters of foreign policy, he held a pro-British stance, which ultimately contributed to his appointment as Minister of Economic Coordination under the leadership of Prime Minister Kálmán Darányi. When Darányi stepped down in May 1938, Regent Miklós Horthy appointed Imrédy as the new prime minister, marking a significant shift in Hungary's political landscape. Imrédy's diplomatic efforts to strengthen Hungary's ties with Britain were viewed unfavorably by Germany and Italy. However, he realized that alienating the two fascist powers on a long-term basis was not a good strategy, and from the autumn of 1938 onward, he pivoted Hungary's foreign policy towards pro-German and pro-Italian policies. Imrédy sought to establish himself as a prominent figure in Hungary's right-wing political scene by founding the Movement of Hungarian Life. In his pursuit of power, he didn't hesitate to eliminate rivals, and notable fascists like Ferenc Szálasi faced harassment from his administration. As Imrédy's ideology shifted further to the right, he advocated for a totalitarian overhaul of the government and introduced laws that curtailed press freedom and had devastating economic consequences for many Jewish people.

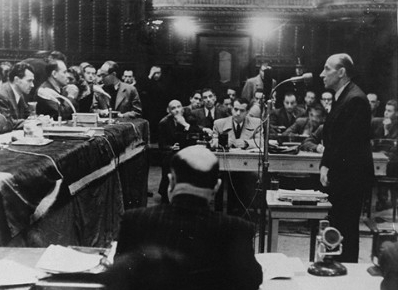
Béla Imrédy on trial before the People's Tribunal in Budapest

In February 1939, Imrédy's moderate opponents, dissatisfied with his increasing alignment with Germany and Hungary's right-wing, presented Regent Horthy with evidence suggesting that Imrédy had Jewish ancestry through his great-grandfather. When confronted with the evidence, Imrédy was unable to refute the claims and subsequently resigned as prime minister on February 13, 1939. Imrédy went on to serve in the Hungarian Army in 1940 and later founded the Party of Hungarian Renewal, a pro-fascist and antisemitic organization, in October of that year. Following Germany's occupation of Hungary in 1944, Imrédy was considered by German Plenipotentiary Edmund Veesenmayer as the top candidate to succeed Miklós Kállay as prime minister. However, Regent Horthy refused to support the idea, and Döme Sztójay was appointed prime minister instead. Imrédy became Sztójay's Minister of Economic Coordination in May 1944, but he was forced to resign in August. After German forces were driven out of Hungary, Imrédy was arrested and tried by a People's Tribunal in November 1945. Found guilty of war crimes and collaboration with the Nazis, he was sentenced to death and executed by a firing squad in the courtyard of the jail in Markó street, Budapest, in 1946.

Political offices
Preceded by Frigyes Korányi	Minister of Finance; 1932–1935	Succeeded by Tihamér Fabinyi
Preceded by Kálmán Darányi	Prime Minister of Hungary; 1938–1939	Succeeded by Pál Teleki
Preceded by Kálmán Kánya	Minister of Foreign Affairs; Acting; 1938	Succeeded by István Csáky
