= Imre Csáky (Minister of Foreign Affairs) =

Hungarian politician

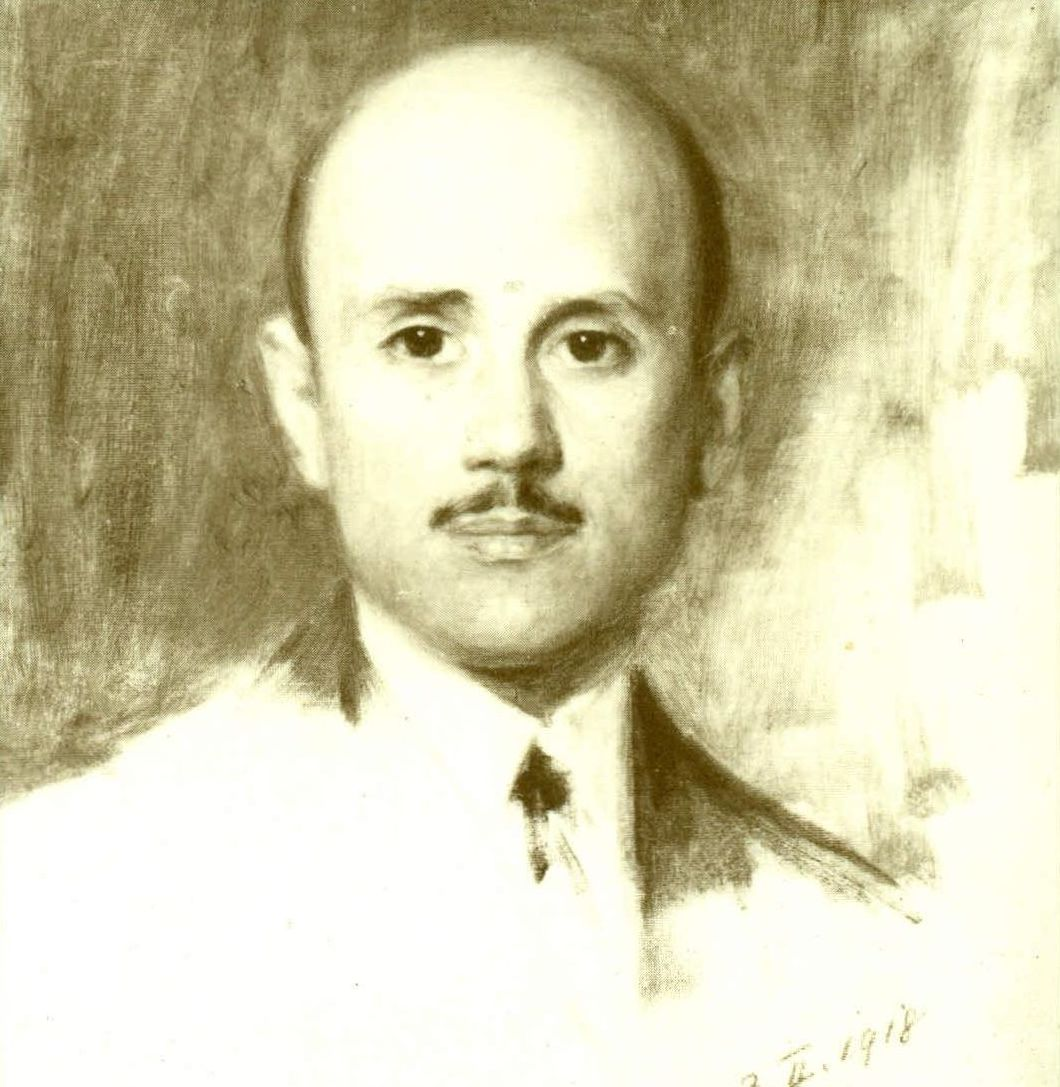

Minister of Foreign Affairs of Hungary
- In office 22 September 1920 – 16 December 1920
- Prime Minister: Pál Teleki
- Preceded by: Pál Teleki
- Succeeded by: Pál Teleki

Personal details
- Born: February 16, 1882 Szepesmindszent, Austria-Hungary
- Died: 22 May 1961 (aged 79) Santa Cruz de Tenerife, Canary Islands
- Party: Independent
- Profession: politician

Count Imre Csáky de Körösszeg et Adorján (16 February 1882 – 22 May 1961) was a Hungarian politician, who served as Minister of Foreign Affairs in 1920. His father was Albin Csáky, a former Minister of Education.

Having completed his studies at the Vienna Orientalistic Academy (later Consular Academy) he joined the diplomatic service and served successively in Dresden, Saint Petersburg, Berlin, Bucharest and Warsaw.

He was instrumental in negotiating the peace treaty of Brest-Litovsk and of the Treaty of Bucharest (1918). He was a member of the Hungarian peace delegation of 1920. As such he conducted negotiations, among others, with Maurice Paléologue, the French secretary of the Ministry of Foreign Affairs.

Csáky was appointed Minister of Foreign Affairs in the Teleki government. He resigned two months later.

Imre Csáky was persecuted after the collapse of Horthy's Hungary, and even more so spending many years in jail during Communism.

He died on the Canary Islands on his way to exile in Venezuela.

== Autobiography ==
- Eva-Marie Csáky (editor) Vom Geachteten zum Geächteten Böhlau, Wien, 1992. ISBN 978-3-205-98228-9

Political offices
Preceded by Pál Teleki	Minister of Foreign Affairs; 1920	Succeeded by Pál Teleki
