= István Csáky =

Hungarian politician

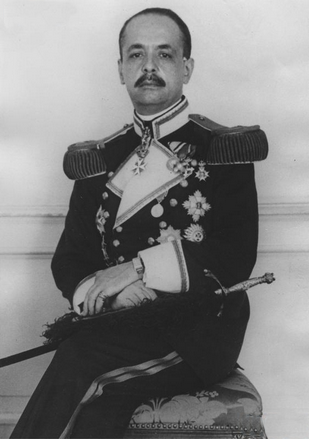

Minister of Foreign Affairs of Hungary
- In office 10 December 1938 – 27 January 1941
- Prime Minister: Béla Imrédy; Pál Teleki
- Preceded by: Béla Imrédy
- Succeeded by: Pál Teleki

Personal details
- Born: July 14, 1894 Segesvár, Austria-Hungary
- Died: 27 January 1941 (aged 46) Budapest, Kingdom of Hungary
- Party: Party of National Unity
- Profession: politician

Count István Csáky de Körösszeg et Adorján (14 July 1894 – 27 January 1941) was a Hungarian nobleman and politician, who served as Minister of Foreign Affairs between 1938 and 1941.

== Early life ==
István was born as the only son of Count Zsigmond György Csáky de Körösszegh et Adorján (1866-1945) and his wife, Ilona Apáthy de Nagytóth (1874-1934). He had a sister, Irma (1897-1967), who never married.

== Political career ==
A descendant of King Stephen Báthory of Poland, Csáky was born in Segesvár (today Sighișoara, Romania), which belonged to the Kingdom of Hungary at that time. He studied law in Budapest and attended the Imperial Consular Academy in Vienna. After the end of World War I, he participated as a diplomat in the peace negotiations that led to the Treaty of Trianon. After that he worked at the Hungarian embassies to the Vatican and in Bucharest, Madrid and Lisbon, and filled several positions in the Foreign Ministry in Budapest.

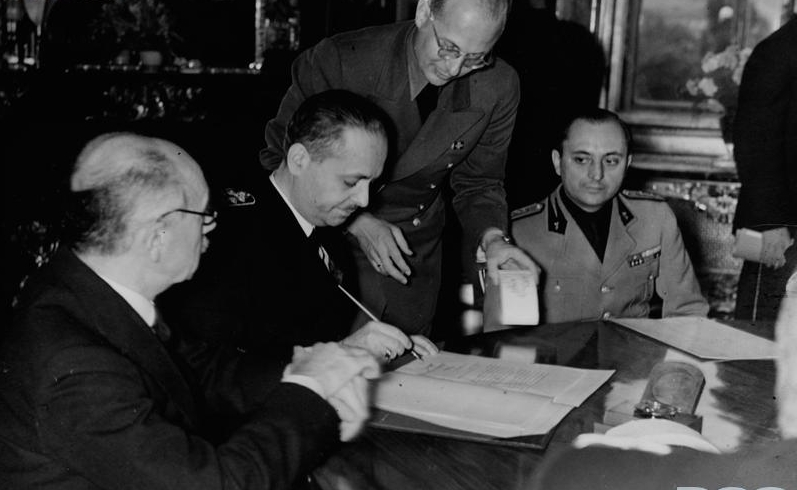
Csáky signs the Second Vienna Award, 1940.

As an official observer of Hungary in 1938 he took part in the negotiations and the Munich Agreement was signed in November 1938 with subsequent negotiations on the First Vienna Award as a member of the Hungarian delegation. On 10 December 1938 he was appointed as Minister of Foreign Affairs by Prime Minister Béla Imrédy. Kálmán Kánya was his predecessor as foreign minister.

As a minister Csáky was involved in the negotiations leading to the Second Vienna Award in August 1940, which aimed to recover the territories lost to Romania in the Treaty of Trianon. Even Hungary's accession to the Tripartite Pact was during the office of Csáky. On 17 December 1940, he signed a friendship agreement at the behest of Germany between Hungary and Yugoslavia, that the Hungarians would break by letting the German troops use the territory of Hungary for the invasion of Yugoslavia. Csáky, however, did not live to see the breach of the agreement, as he died in January 1941 due to a serious illness.

== Personal life ==
Csáky married Countess Maria Anna Irma Helene Camilla Chorinsky von Ledske (b. 1912), daughter of Count Karl Chorinsky von Ledske (1873-1948) and Ilona Maria Jozefa Szögyény-Marich de Magyarszőgyén et Szolgaegyház (1879-1950). The couple had no issue.

Political offices
Preceded by Béla Imrédy	Minister of Foreign Affairs; 1938–1941	Succeeded by Pál Teleki
