= Kocsárd Janky =

Hungarian military officer

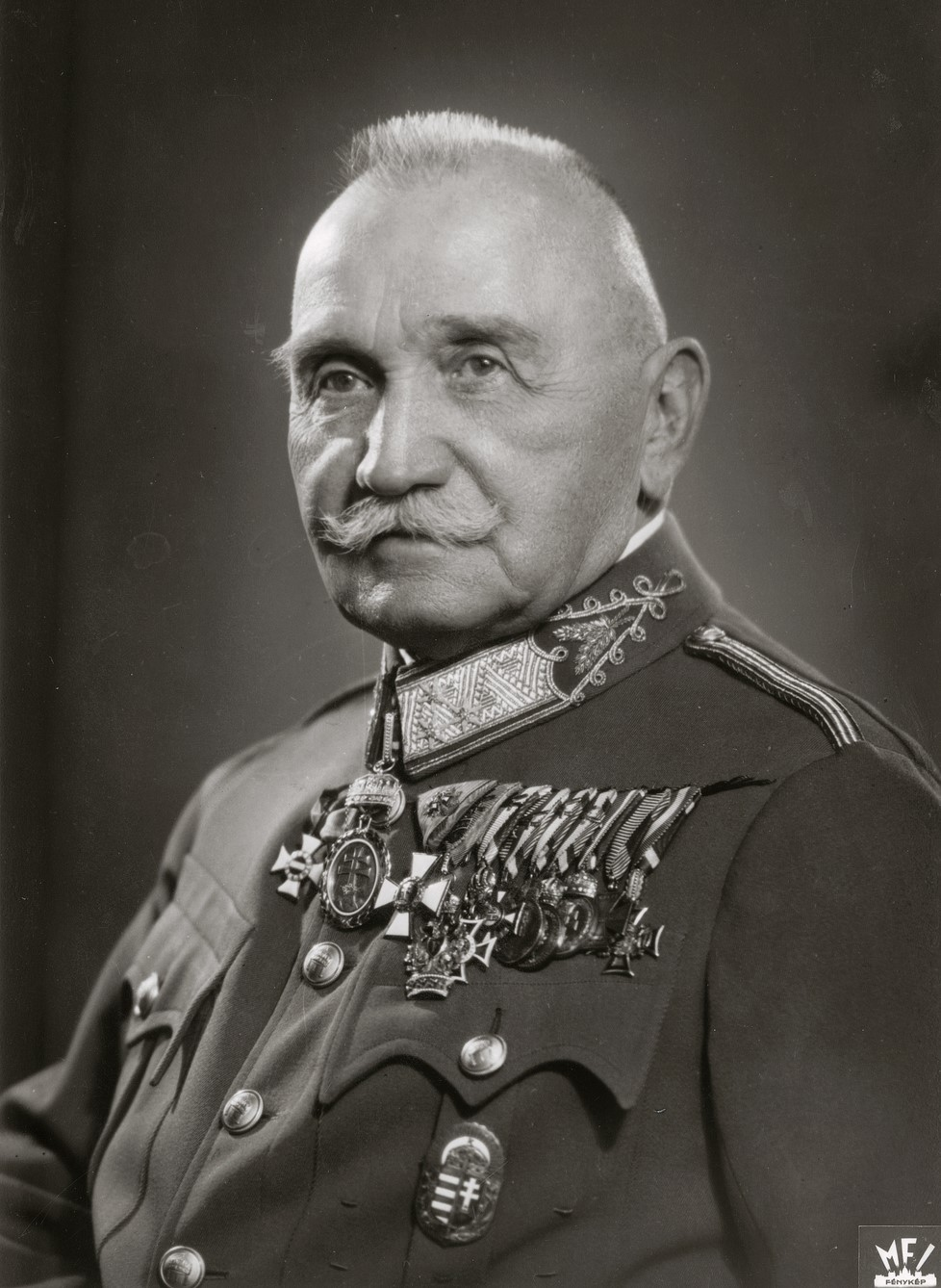
- Born: February 11, 1868; Déva, Austria-Hungary
- Died: October 20, 1954 (aged 86); Budapest, People's Republic of Hungary
- Military career
- Allegiance: Austria-Hungary; Kingdom of Hungary
- Service years: 1889–1930
- Rank: Cavalry General
- Conflicts: World War I

Vitéz Kocsárd Janky de Bulcs (11 February 1868 – 20 October 1954) was a Hungarian military officer, who served as Chief of Army Staff between 1922 and 1930.

== Biography ==
Kocsárd Janky born was in Déva, Transylvania (then part of the Kingdom of Hungary) on February 11, 1868, to Lajos Janky, an army officer. He began his military education at a preparatory school in Kőszeg, followed by studies at the prestigious Theresian Military Academy in Wiener Neustadt. Upon graduating in 1889, he was commissioned as a second lieutenant into the Imperial and Royal (k.u.k.) 1st Hussar Regiment. After a series of promotions, he was appointed Chief of Staff of the 1st Cavalry Division headquartered in Temesvár (now Timișoara, Romania), upon his promotion to major in 1909.

At the outbreak of the First World War, Janky was appointed commander of the Imperial and Royal 4th Hussar Regiment on July 24, 1914. During the Brusilov Offensive in June 1916, he distinguished himself near Lutsk (then Luck) by holding a critical section of the front against overwhelming Russian attacks for eight days. For this action, he was awarded the Knight's Cross of the Military Order of Maria Theresa in 1922, granted by the order's chapter which continued to process wartime citations after the empire's collapse. Later in the war, he served as a brigade commander on the Italian Front, notably during the Battle of the Piave River in 1918, before being transferred back to Transylvania shortly before the armistice. Following the war's end, he was briefly held as a prisoner of war by Romanian forces in Transylvania in 1919.

After his release, he joined the counter-revolutionary forces of Miklós Horthy, who was organizing a National Army in Szeged to fight against the Hungarian Soviet Republic. Within this new Hungarian National Army, he was given command of the Szeged brigade in 1920.

As the new Kingdom of Hungary was established, Janky's career advanced rapidly. In 1922, he was appointed Chief of the General Staff of the Royal Hungarian Army. In 1925, in a move reflecting Regent Horthy's deep trust, he was also named Commander-in-Chief of the Army, thus consolidating the two highest military posts. He abruptly retired in 1930. The decision came after Regent Horthy promoted the politically ambitious Gyula Gömbös to major general and appointed him Minister of Defense without consulting Janky, an act the latter viewed as a professional slight that undermined his authority.

Janky lived in quiet retirement in his Budapest apartment for the next two decades. In 1951, the new communist regime targeted him as a figure of the old "Horthyist" era. He and his wife were subjected to forced resettlement, a form of internal exile, and were ultimately sent to Debrecen. Kocsárd Janky died there on October 20, 1954, at the age of 86.

== Sources ==
- A Vitézi Rend honlapja
- Janky Kocsárd kitüntetései
- Shvoy Kálmán titkos naplója és emlékirata. 1918-1945. Perneky Mihály (szerk.), Kossuth Könyvkiadó, Budapest, 1983.

Military offices
Preceded by General Viktor Lorx	Chief of the General Staff; 1 September 1922 – 1930	Succeeded by Colonel-General Vilmos Rőder
