= Ferenc Keresztes-Fischer =

Hungarian lawyer and politician

Vitéz Ferenc Keresztes-Fischer
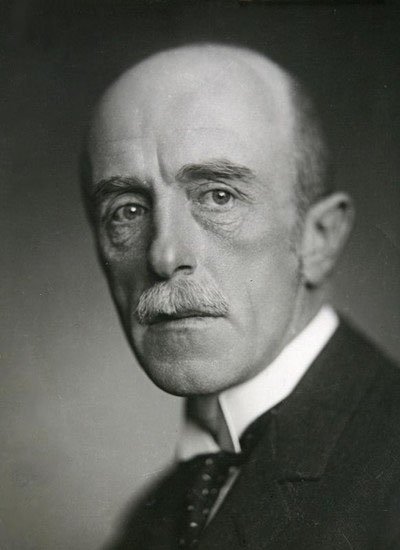
- Keresztes-Fischer in 1935

Minister of the Interior of Hungary
- In office 24 August 1931 – 4 March 1935
- Prime Minister: Gyula Károlyi; Gyula Gömbös
- Preceded by: Béla Scitovszky
- Succeeded by: Miklós Kozma
- In office 14 May 1938 – 22 March 1944
- Prime Minister: Béla Imrédy; Pál Teleki; Miklós Kállay
- Preceded by: József Széll
- Succeeded by: Andor Jaross

Personal details
- Born: 18 February 1881 Pécs, Austria Hungary
- Died: 3 March 1948 (aged 67) Vienna, Austria
- Party: Christian National Union Party; Unity Party; Party of National Unity; Party of Hungarian Life
- Spouse: Margit Rihmer
- Parent(s): Ferenc Fischer; Margit Krasznay de Kraszna
- Relatives: Lajos Keresztes-Fischer (brother)
- Profession: politician

Ferenc Keresztes-Fischer (18 February 1881 – 3 March 1948) was a Hungarian lawyer and politician.

He was an advisor of the Pécsi Takarékpénztár Rt. / Pécs Savings Bank Corp. He was the prefect of Baranya County 1921–1931, and the prefect of Somogy County 1925–1931 and was appointed as Interior Minister of Hungary twice; between 1931–1935 and 1938–1944. He controlled the police terror against both the left and right wing political movements. In a secret directive he ordered the collection of press articles.

== Interior minister ==
The politics of the Kingdom of Hungary were notable for the complete absence of the political left. The main divisions in Hungarian politics were instead between a right-wing group known as the conservatives vs. a more right-wing group known as the radicals. Both factions were strongly anti-communist and antisemitic, but the conservatives tempered their antisemitism by arguing that Hungary needed its Jewish middle class to keep the economy functioning while the radicals did not. Both factions were committed to regaining the lands lost under the Treaty of Trianon and restore "the lands of the Crown of St. Istvan" in their entirety. The conservatives tended to be Anglophiles who believed that Great Britain would ultimately step in to undo the Treaty of Trianon while the radicals were Germanophiles who favored an alliance with the Reich as the best way of undoing the Treaty of Trianon. The conservatives favored retaining the existing political system, which was nominally democratic, but in fact an oligarchy as most people were disfranchised and only wealthy men were allowed to vote, which allowed the aristocracy to dominate politics. The radicals by contrast transforming Hungary into a fascist totalitarian regime, which would not even maintain the pretense of being a democracy.

The split between the conservatives and the radicals extended into the Hungarian state. The Ministries of Defense, Industry and Finance were controlled by the radicals. The Ministry of Justice and the Ministry of Foreign Affairs were split evenly between the conservatives and the radicals and it largely depended upon who was the minister at the time that determined which way those ministries tilted. The Ministry of Agriculture and the Interior Ministry were controlled by the conservatives. As one of the leading conservatives, Keresztes-Fischer was considered to be one of the most powerful men in Hungary, who used the state police to keep a limit on the activities of the radicals. The American historian Andrew Janos described Keresztes-Fischer as being "indominable" in his struggle against the radicals, through he was hampered by the fact that many policemen and especially the gendarmes were supporters of the radicals who did not always follow his orders.

Keresztes-Fischer was a close friend and ally of the conservative former prime minister, Count István Bethlen, and his presence in the cabinet as Interior Minister was often felt to be a surrogate for allowing Bethlen to exercise political influence. As a politician, Keresztes-Fischer tended to work behind the scenes to weaken the anti-Semitic laws in Hungary, pressing to water down the numerus clausus law of 1920, which imposed restrictions on the number of Hungarian Jews allowed to attend the universities. Under the First Anti-Jewish Law passed on 29 May 1938 by the radical prime minister Béla Imrédy, the percentage of Jews allowed to work in the professions was 20%, which thereby cost about 20, 000 Hungarian Jews their jobs. As a great many Hungarian Jews were active in the arts as actors, singers, writers, playwrights, musicians, poets, and so forth, the First Anti-Jewish Law hit the world of Hungarian arts especially hard. In response, Géza Ribáry, a prominent Jewish lawyer and a renowned amateur pianist whose performances in Budapest were well attended, petitioned Keresztes-Fischer to allow an exemption for Hungarian Jewish artists to continue performing and thus earn a living. Keresztes-Fischer allowed an exemption, ruling that Hungarian Jewish artists could perform only for Jewish audiences, but were not allowed to promote their performances to the general public via posters and flyers. In this way, the Artist Action (Művészakció) of OMIKE (Országos Magyar Izraelita Közművelődési Egyesület-Hungarian Jewish Educational Association) was born. On 12 September 1938, he allowed the OMIKE to increase its activities. Under the Second Anti-Jewish Law of 5 May 1939 passed by the conservative prime minister Pál Teleki, the percentage of Jews allowed to work in the arts was lowered to 6%, which made OMIKE crucial for allowing Jewish artists to continue to earn a living.

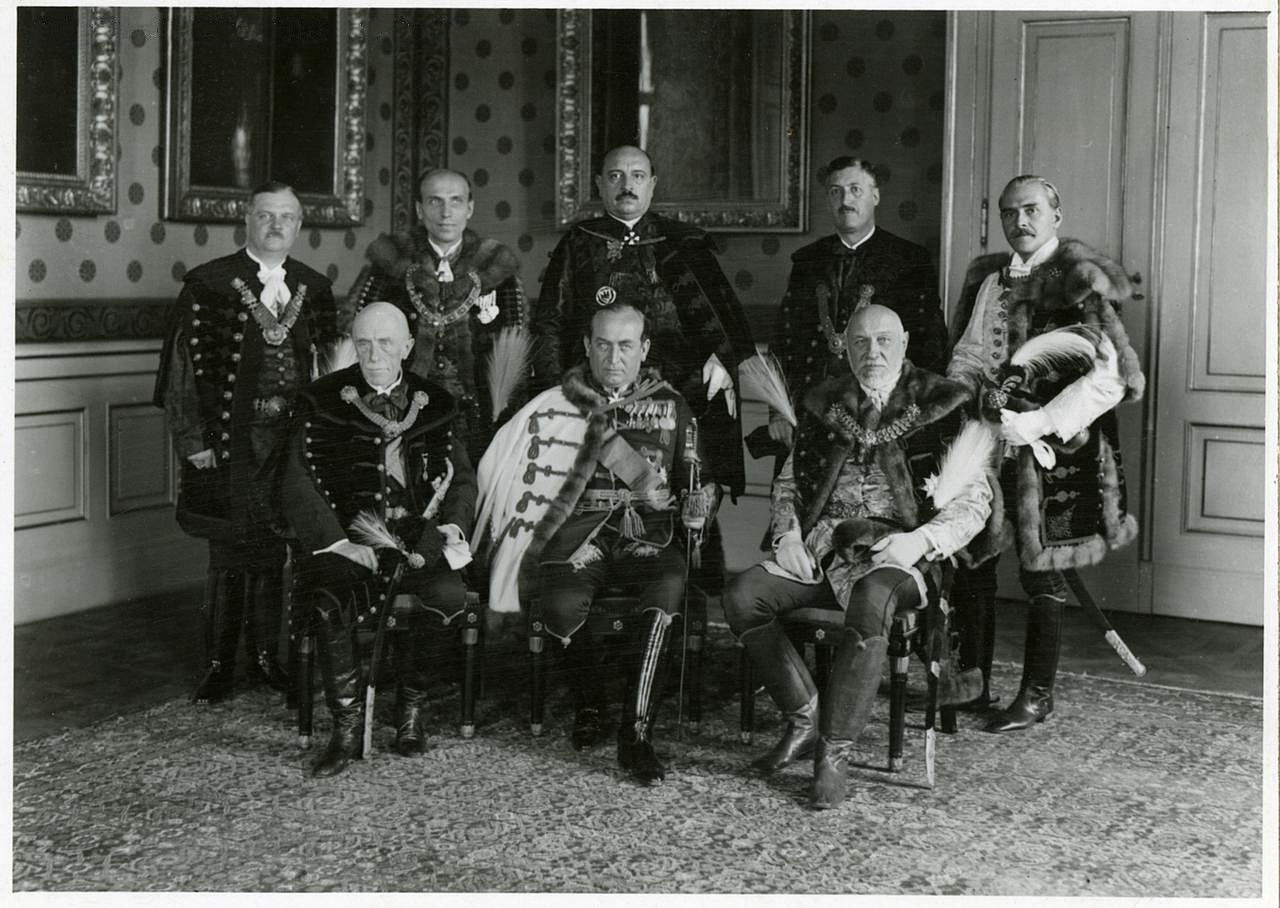
Gyula Gömbös (sitting in the center) and his cabinet in 1932 dressed in the traditional clothing of Magyar noblemen. Keresztes-Fischer is sitting to the left of Gömbös. Standing in the rear are two future prime ministers, Béla Imrédy (second to the left) and Miklós Kállay who is the last man to the right. The Education Minister and future rival of Keresztes-Fischer Bálint Hóman is standing behind Gömbös.

Under the First Jewish Law, a bureaucratic maze had been imposed on the Hungarian film industry with the Ministry of Education and Religion being given control over the film industry and the Film Chamber, the Ministry of Trade being given control over the export and importation of films and the Ministry of Interior being given control over censorship. Prior to 1944, Hungarian Jews played an oversized role in the business and arts worlds of Hungary and most of the film studios in Hungary were owned by Jewish businessmen while many of the actors, directors, producers, scriptwriters, and film crews were also Jewish. Under the First Anti-Jewish Law, Hungarian Jews were supposed to be excluded from the film industry, but Keresztes-Fischer as Interior Minister consistently fought to soften the application of the law by arguing that without Jewish involvement the Hungarian film industry would collapse. Keresztes-Fischer constantly fought with the anti-Semitic Education Minister, Bálint Hóman, who wanted to end the involvement of the Hungarian Jews in the film industry. In 1939-1940, Keresztes-Fischer resisted public pressure that all involved in the film industry join the Film Chamber, which was open only to Christians, which in turn allowed Hungarian Jews to continue to work in the film industry as actors, producers, writers and so on. In a degree issued on 14 December 1939, Keresztes-Fischer removed the licences to operate cinemas from a few Jewish businessmen as a token gesture to appease the anti-Semitic public, but allowed most Jewish cimena owners to keep their licenses.

== World War Two ==
During the Second World War he was an active supporter of the Regent, Admiral Miklós Horthy. On 1 April 1941, the prime minister Pál Teleki called for a meeting on the Council of Ministers to decide whatever to take part in the invasion of Yugoslavia. Along with the Foreign Minister László Bárdossy, Keresztes-Fischer called a limited invasion of Yugoslavia independent of the German invasion of Yugoslavia with the aim of occupying certain Magyar majority districts in the Banat. By contrast, the Defense Minister Károly Bartha and the Chief of the General Staff, General Henrik Werth called for a full invasion of Yugoslavia. Teleki was opposed to the invasion of Yugoslavia and advised against granting Germany transit rights to invade Yugoslavia. After the suicide of Pál Teleki (3 April 1941) Keresztes-Fischer became acting Prime Minister on that day and was replaced with Bárdossy. Following the Bombing of Kassa on 26 June 1941, the prime minister László Bárdossy called for a meeting of the council of ministers to ask for a declaration of war on the Soviet Union. Keresztes-Fischer was the only minister who voted against declaring war on the Soviet Union. After Hungary declared war on the Soviet Union on 27 June 1941, General Werth started to press Bárdossy for a colossal scheme of ethnic cleansing that called for expelling all Jews, Romanians and Slovaks living under Hungarian rule into Galicia region (modern western Ukraine), a plan that would had uprooted 8 million people if executed. Bárdossy rejected Werth's plan, but did agree to scaled down version under which all Galician Jews living in Hungary (who were widely believed to be all illegal immigrants) would be expelled into Galicia. Keresztes-Fischer was the only minister who objected and voted against the plan for expelling all of the Galician Jews.

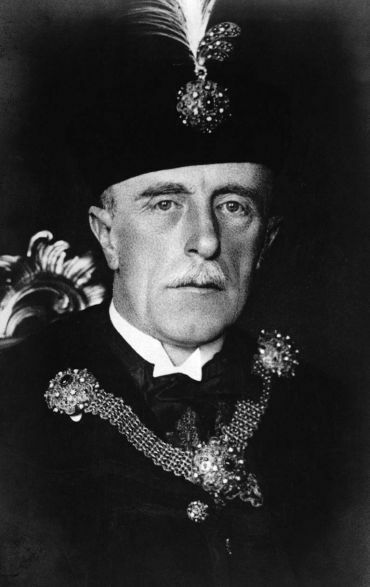
Ferenc Keresztes-Fischer wearing the traditional uniform of a Magyar nobleman, 1932

Over the course of December 1941-January 1942 the Honvéd (Royal Hungarian Army) was deployed to the recently annexed Banat region to put down guerrilla resistance to Hungarian rule. The Honved soldiers operating in the Banat were involved in massacres of Jews and Serbs, most notably the Novi Sad raid in January 1942 in the city of Újvidék (modern Novi Sad, Serbia). The fact that women and children were not spared was considered scandalous when the news of the massacres appeared in the Hungarian newspapers in late January 1942. Keresztes-Fischer in a public letter to the Chief of the General Staff, General Ferenc Szombathelyi, demanded that he investigate the massacres in the Banat, which were started after his letter was published. The investigation was stopped by the personal order of Admiral Horthy in August 1942 under the grounds that it was damaging the image of the Honved, but was later restarted in September 1943. At a trial in December 1943-January 1944, General Feketehalmy-Czeydner along with several other Honvéd officers were convicted of the Újvidék massacre with Feketehalmy-Czeydner being sentenced to 15 years in prison. One year later, on March 7, 1942, Bárdossy the prime minister was forced to resign suddenly by Regent Horthy and as Minister of the Interior, Ferenc-Keresztes was the interim Prime Minister until 9 March, when Miklós Kállay was appointed to this position.

He joined the Bethlen-Kállay political conservatives, which wanted to establish contacts with the Allies to negotiate Hungary's treatment after the war. After the March 1944 occupation of Hungary by Nazi Germany, he was imprisoned in a concentration camp and then exiled to Austria.

His younger brother was Lajos Keresztes-Fischer, a Hungarian military officer who served as Chief of General Staff in 1938. He was also arrested after Ferenc Szálasi's coup.

== See also ==
- Serbian-Hungarian Baranya-Baja Republic 1921

== Sources ==
- Magyar Életrajzi Lexikon
- Bán, András (2004). Hungarian-British Diplomacy 1938-1941 The Attempt to Maintain Relations. London: Taylor & Francis. ISBN 9781135753924.
- Benziger, Karl P. (July 2005). "The Trial of László Bárdossy: The Second World War and Factional Politics in Contemporary Hungary". Journal of Contemporary History. 40 (3): 465–481.
- Bölöny, József – Hubai, László: Magyarország kormányai 1848–2004 [Cabinets of Hungary 1848–2004], Akadémiai Kiadó, Budapest, 2004 (5th edition).|
- Dèak, Istvàn (2016). "Introduction". In Frederick Bondy, Jenő Lévai (ed.). The Writers, Artists, Singers, and Musicians of the National Hungarian Jewish Cultural Association (OMIKE), 1939–1944. West Lafayette: Purdue University Press. pp. 1–20. ISBN 9781612494814.
- Eisen, George (2023). A Summer of Mass Murder: 1941 Rehearsal for the Hungarian Holocaust. West Lafayette: Purdue University Press.
- Frey, David (2017). Jews, Nazis and the Cinema of Hungary The Tragedy of Success, 1929-1944. London: Bloomsbury Publishing. ISBN 9781786730619.
- Janos, Andrew (2012). The Politics of Backwardness in Hungary, 1825-1945. Princeton: Princeton University Press. ISBN 9781400843022.
- Akten des Volksgerichtsprozesses gegen Franz A. Basch, Volksgruppenführer der Deutschen in Ungarn, Budapest 1945/46, Friedrich Spiegel-Schmidt, Lóránt Tilkovszky, Gerhard Seewann, Norbert Spannenberger, Oldenbourg Wissenschaftsverlag 1999.
- Romsics, Ignac (2017). "Hungary". In David Stahel (ed.). Joining Hitler's Crusade European Nations and the Invasion of the Soviet Union, 1941. Cambridge: Cambridge University Press. pp. 79–106. ISBN 9781316510346.

Political offices
Preceded by Béla Scitovszky	Minister of the Interior; 1931–1935	Succeeded by Miklós Kozma
Preceded by József Széll	Minister of the Interior; 1938–1944	Succeeded by Andor Jaross
Preceded by Pál Teleki	Prime Minister of Hungary; Acting; 1941	Succeeded by László Bárdossy
Preceded by László Bárdossy	Prime Minister of Hungary; Acting; 1942	Succeeded by Miklós Kállay
Preceded by László Bárdossy	Minister of Foreign Affairs; Acting; 1942	Succeeded by Miklós Kállay
