= Szenes =

Szenes is a Hungarian surname. Notable people with the surname include:

- Árpád Szenes (1897–1985), Hungarian painter
- Hannah Szenes (1921–1944), Hungarian Jewish resistance member
- István Szenes, Hungarian figure skater
- Zoltán Szenes (born 1951), Hungarian military officer
