= Sándor Zsolt =

Hungarian general

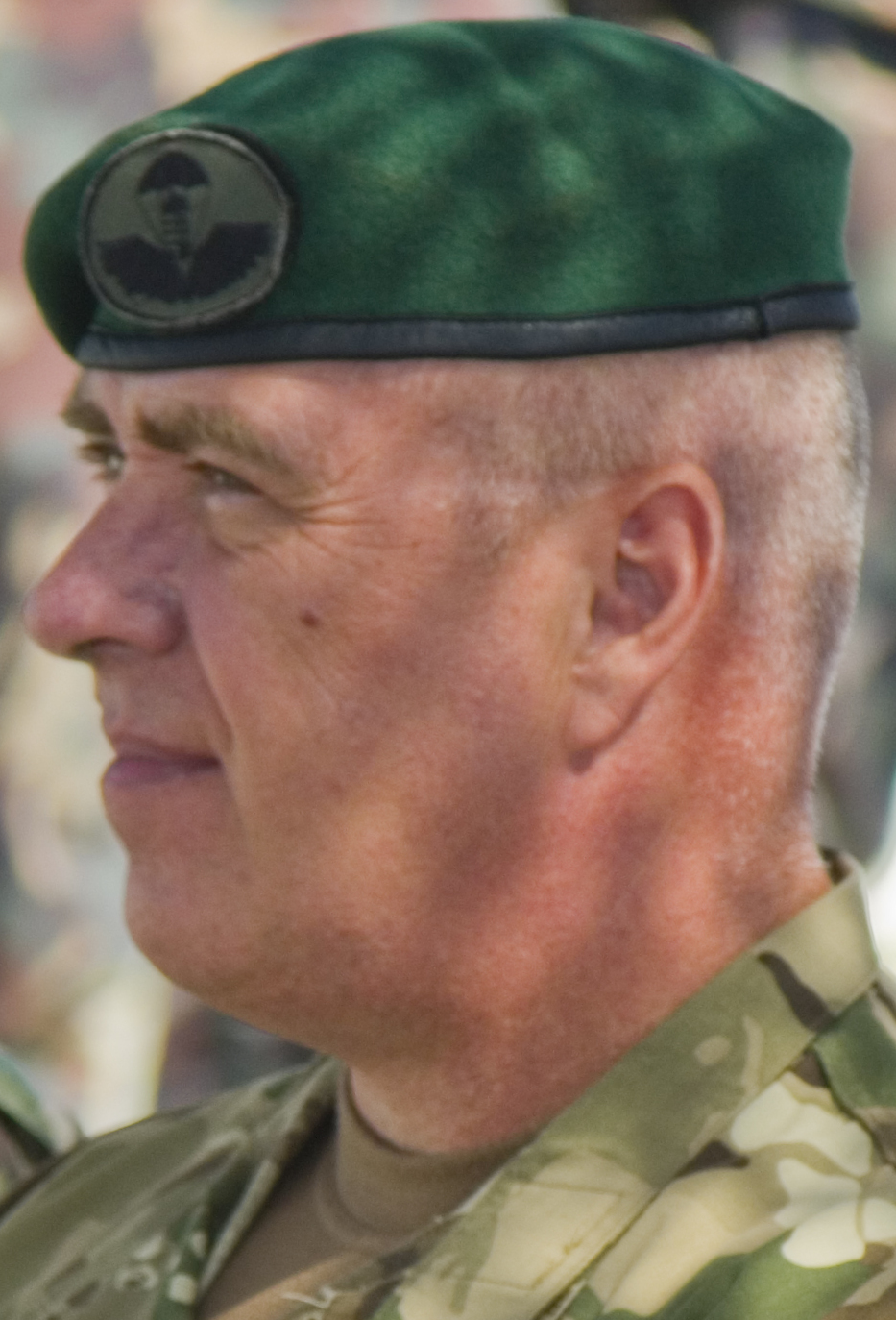
- Born: June 4, 1968 (age 58); Budapest, Hungary
- Children: 2
- Military career
- Allegiance: Hungary
- Branch: Mechanized infantry
- Service years: 1986–present
- Rank: Colonel General
- Commands: Chief of the General Staff

Sándor Zsolt (Hungarian: Zsolt Sándor) is a Hungarian Defence Forces officer and diplomat. He has served as Chief of General Staff since 2026.

== Early career ==
He began his military career in 1986 as an officer student at the Kossuth Lajos Military College, after which he served as a platoon commander in the 5th Mechanized Rifle Brigade of the Hungarian Army in Mezőtúr from 1989.

In 1990, he was promoted to first lieutenant and worked as the chief of staff of the 2nd Mechanized Rifle Battalion of the 5th Mechanized Rifle Brigade of the Hungarian Army. Two years later, he was appointed commander of the same unit. In 1994, he was transferred to Cegléd, to the headquarters battalion of the 3rd Mechanized Division, where he worked as an operations officer and was promoted to captain at the same time. In 1995, he held the position of deputy battalion commander. A year later, he was transferred to the 88th Rapid Reaction Battalion, where he again worked as an operations officer. In the following years, he served in various positions from company commander to S-3 chief. In 1997, he participated in the Military Observer Course in Vienna, and a year later in the NATO Staff Officer Orientation Course. In 1999, he was promoted to major.

== Deployments ==
Between 2000 and 2001, he served in Kuwait, where he was an operations officer in the southern sector of UNIKOM. From 2001, he served as the deputy commander of the 1st Light Mixed Regiment of the Hungarian Armed Forces for 3 years. In 2003, he participated in the Peace Operations Planning Course.

On 1 November 2004, he was appointed commander of the MH 25/88th Light Mixed Battalion and at the same time was promoted to lieutenant colonel, and 3 years later, on 1 November 2007, he was appointed colonel. Since 16 September 2008, he has been the commander of the Baghlan Province Reconstruction Team in Afghanistan.

On March 4, 2011, President Pál Schmitt, upon the proposal of the Minister of Defense Csaba Hende, promoted Colonel Zsolt, then-Commander of the 25th Infantry Brigade "György Klapka", to Brigadier General. Between 2014 and 2017, he was a defense attaché in the United States of America.

== Commands ==
In 2017, he was appointed Deputy Chief of Staff for Operations of the Hungarian Armed Forces Joint Forces Command. In 2018, he was Chief of Staff for Land Forces of the Hungarian Armed Forces Joint Forces Command. From 2019 to 2020, he was Deputy Chief of Staff for Operations of the Hungarian Armed Forces Command. In 2020, he was appointed Commander of the Hungarian Armed Forces Reserve Training and Support Command.

From 2021, he became the Deputy Commander of the Hungarian Defence Forces, and then, following the re-establishment of the Defence General Staff, he became the Deputy Chief of the Defence General Staff. In 2023, he retired due to age, and from 2024, was Hungarian Ambassador to Greece.

After the election of Magyar government in the 2026 Hungarian parliamentary election, newly appointed Minister of National Defense Romulusz Ruszin-Szendi invited him to serve as Chief of the General Staff, a position he has served in since 1 June 2026. His presentation ceremony took place on 5 June at the Hungarian Parliament Building.
