= József Széll =

Hungarian politician

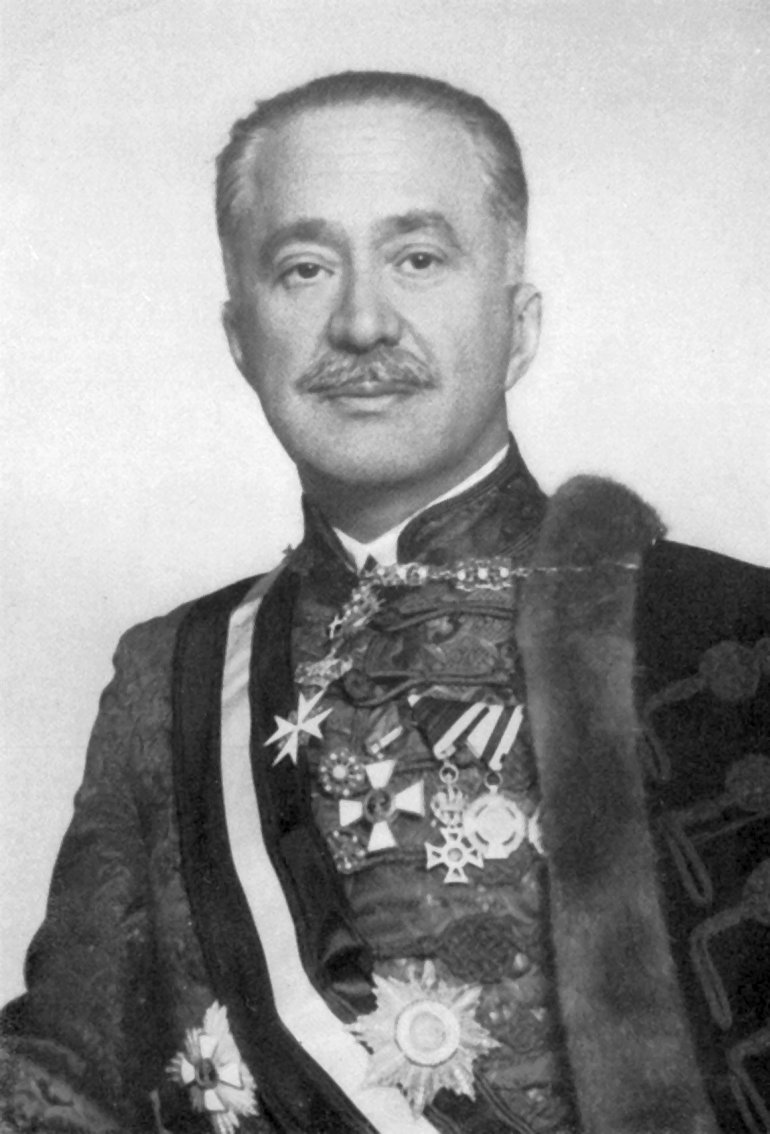

Minister of the Interior of Hungary
- In office 10 April 1937 – 13 May 1938
- Preceded by: Kálmán Darányi
- Succeeded by: Ferenc Keresztes-Fischer

Personal details
- Born: 14 October 1880; Szombathely, Hungary
- Died: 27 August 1956 (aged 75); Budapest, Hungary
- Political party: Party of National Unity
- Profession: politician

József Széll de Duka et Szentgyörgyvölgy (14 October 1880 – 27 August 1956) was a Hungarian politician, who served as Interior Minister between 1937 and 1938. He was the nephew of Kálmán Széll, former Prime Minister of Hungary.

Political offices
Preceded by Kálmán Darányi	Minister of the Interior; 1937–1938	Succeeded by Ferenc Keresztes-Fischer
