= Knićanin =

Knićanin Книћанин
- Village (Selo)
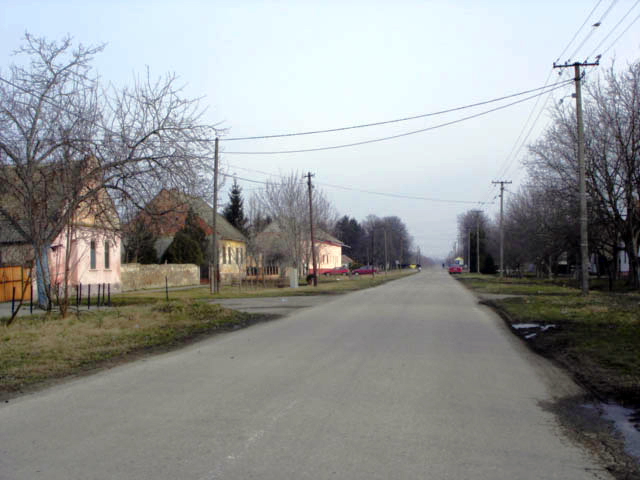
- Main street

- Location within Serbia Knićanin (Serbia) Knićanin (Europe)
- Coordinates: 45°11′14″N 20°19′12″E
- Country: Serbia
- Province: Vojvodina
- District: Central Banat
- Municipalities: Zrenjanin
- Elevation: 59 m (194 ft)

Population (2022)
  - Total: 1,384
- Time zone: UTC+1 (CET)
  - Summer (DST): UTC+2 (CEST)
- Postal code: 23265
- Area code: +381(0)23
- Car plates: ZR

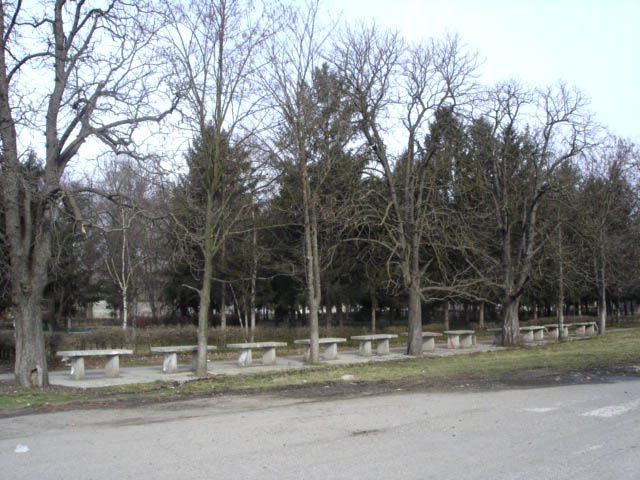
Center of the village with market place and park.

Knićanin (Serbian Cyrillic: Книћанин, Hungarian: Rezsőháza, German: Rudolfsgnad) is a village in Serbia. It is located in the Zrenjanin municipal area, in the Banat region (Central Banat District), Vojvodina province. Its population is 2,034 (2002 census) and most of its inhabitants are ethnic Serbs (97.39%).

== Name ==
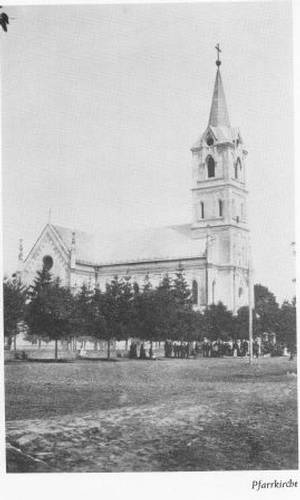
Former Catholic church Resurrection of Jesus in Knićanin (before Rudolfsgnad) from the year 1877

The village was named after voivod Stevan Knićanin, who was the commander of the Serbian volunteer squads in the Serbian Vojvodina during the 1848/1849 revolution. Other names for the village used in Serbian were Knićaninovo (Книћаниново) and Rudolfovo (Рудолфово).

The former German name of the village, Rudolfsgnad, was in use since 1868, when the village was named after Crown Prince Rudolf (1858-1889). The Hungarian version of the name derives from the German.

== Population ==
Knićanin has a Serb ethnic majority; ethnic Serbs number 1,981 inhabitants of the village. Other ethnic groups include Hungarians, Yugoslavs, Slovaks, Croats, and others.

== History ==
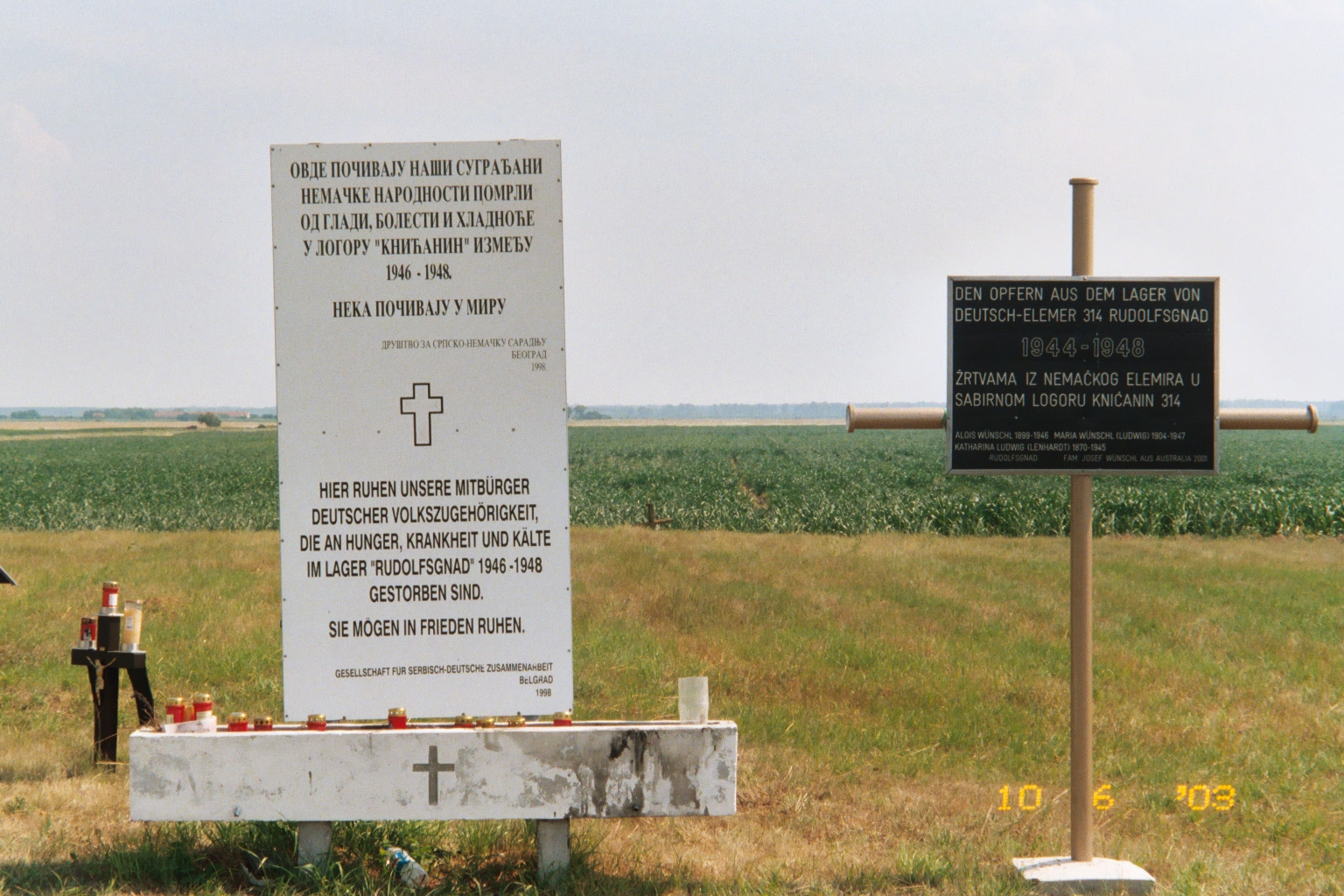
The memorial at the edge of the old German graveyard, where the internees of the prison camp themselves buried those who died of "hunger, disease, and cold", according to the sign.

The village was founded during Austrian administration (in 1866) by German (Danube Swabian) colonists, who mainly came from Ečka and Lukićevo. Initially, it was part of the Banatian Military Frontier. After the abolishment of the frontier in 1873, the village was included into Torontál County, which was administratively a part of the Kingdom of Hungary within the dual monarchy of Austria-Hungary. In the 19th and the first half of the 20th century, the villagers were mainly farmers and artisans. According to the 1910 census, the village had German ethnic majority.

In 1918, as part of the Banat, Bačka and Baranja region, the village firstly became part of the Kingdom of Serbia and then part of the Kingdom of Serbs, Croats and Slovenes (later renamed to Yugoslavia). From 1918 to 1922 it was part of the Veliki Bečkerek county, from 1922 to 1929 part of the Belgrade oblast, and from 1929 to 1941 part of the Danube Banovina. In 1931, the population of the village numbered 3,072 inhabitants. During the Axis occupation of Yugoslavia from 1941 to 1944, the village was part of the German-administered Banat region that had special status within the Axis puppet state of Serbia. Before the end of the World War II, the population of the village was mainly composed of ethnic Germans (Danube Swabians).

At the end of World War II, in 1944, one part of local Danube Swabian inhabitants left from the area, together with defeated German army. Those Danube Swabians who remained in the region had their citizenships and all civil rights revoked by the AVNOJ decrees of 1943 and 1944 issued by the Yugoslav communists and were sent to local communist prison camps. One of these camps was located in Knićanin and internees in this camp mostly originated from central and southern Banat. The average number of people inside prison camp was 17,200, while the largest number was 20,500 and altogether there were about 33,000 prisoners. The camp operated from 10 October 1945 until middle of March 1948 (total operating time was 29 months or 880 days). According to some claims, number of internees who died in the camp might be about 13,000 (9,500 death cases were documented). Main causes of death were typhus, malaria, and malnutrition. After communist prison camps were dissolved in 1948 due to the pressure of the Red Cross and the Vatican, most of the remaining German population left Yugoslavia.

Since 1944, the village was part of Yugoslav Vojvodina, which, from 1945, was an autonomous province of new socialist Serbia within Yugoslavia. After the war, Serb families from Bosnia, Croatia, and Montenegro were settled in the village and the post-war population censuses recorded Serb ethnic majority in this settlement.

A memorial dedicated to internees who died in the prison camp was constructed nearby in 1998 with an inscription in both Serbian and German. The larger sign on the memorial reads: "Here rest our fellow citizens of German descent, who died of hunger, sickness, and cold in the camp Knićanin from 1946 to 1948. May they rest in peace". The smaller sign reads: "To the victims from German Elemir in the camp of Knićanin 314".

== Historical Population ==
- 1948: 5,977
- 1953: 1,802
- 1961: 2,169
- 1971: 2,251
- 1981: 2,226
- 1991: 2,227
- 2002: 2,034
- 2011: 1,753
- 2022: 1,384

== People from Knićanin ==
- Henrik Werth (1881-1952), Hungarian general of German descent.

== See also ==
- Zrenjanin
- Serbian Banat
- List of cities, towns and villages in Vojvodina
