= Chief of General Staff (Hungary) =

Highest ranking military officer in Hungary

- Honvéd Vezérkar főnöke

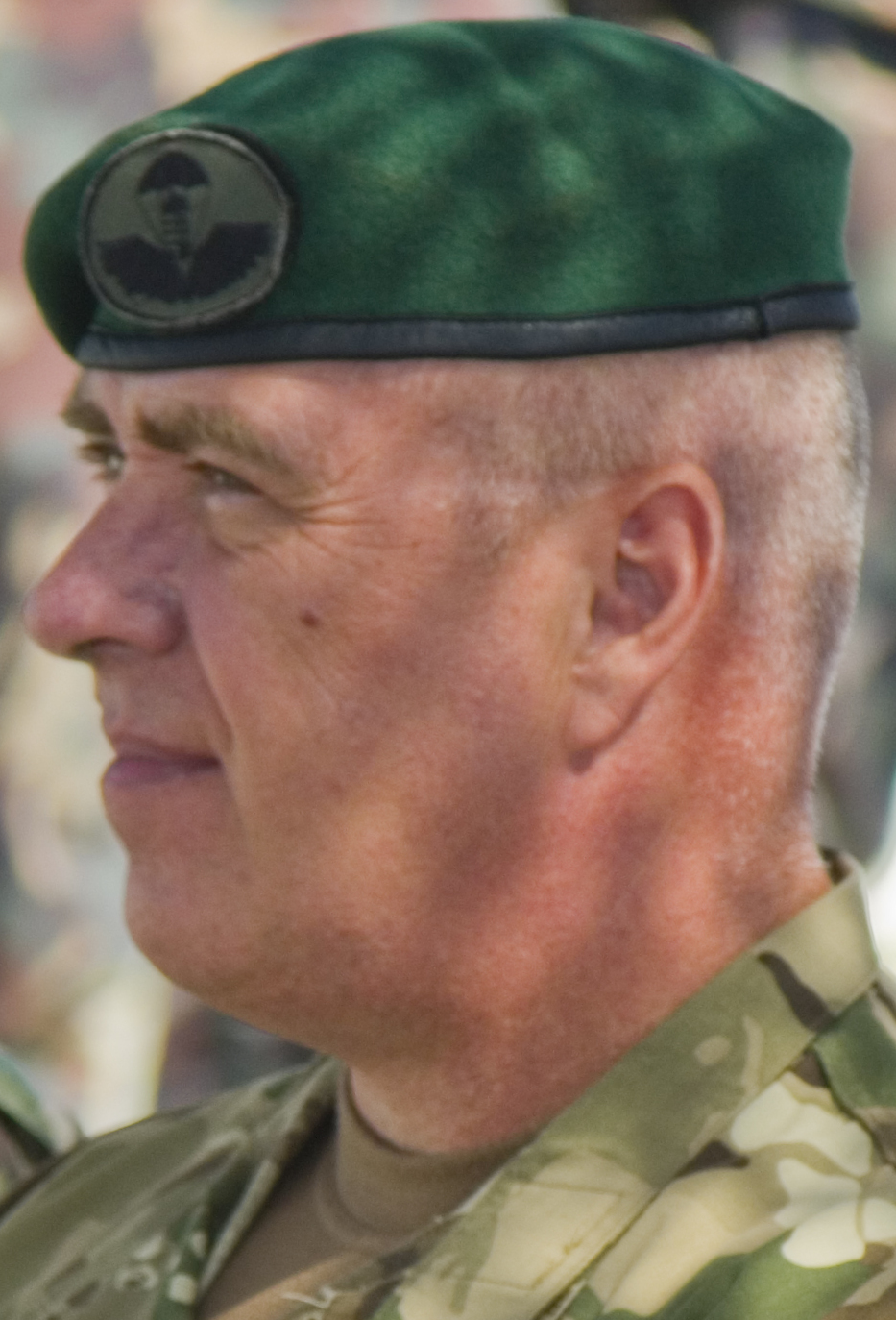
- Incumbent; Sándor Zsolt since 1 June 2026
- Hungarian Defence Forces
- Type: Chief of defence
- Member of: Hungarian Defence Forces Command
- Reports to: Minister of Defence
- Seat: Budapest
- Nominator: Minister of Defence
- Appointer: President of Hungary
- Precursor: Chief of the Austro-Hungarian General Staff
- Formation: 4 January 1922
- First holder: Viktor Lorx
- Deputy: Deputy Chief of General Staff
- Website: Official website

The Chief of General Staff (Hungarian: Honvéd Vezérkar főnöke; between 2019 and 2022: Commander of the Hungarian Defense Forces (Hungarian: a Magyar Honvédség Parancsnoka)) is the highest-ranking military officer in the Hungarian Defence Forces and is responsible for maintaining control over the service branches.

He is responsible for development, organisation, and equipping, training and functioning of the first strategic echelon (stand-by forces) and the other strategic echelon (reserve). The Defence Forces Command coordinates the tasks of the armed forces of the Republic of Hungary, develops recommendations for the planning, organisation and supervision of the Ministry's military duties, and for the development of combat capability.

Since 2007, the Hungarian Defence Forces is under a unified command structure. The Ministry of Defence maintains the political and civilian control of the military.

On 1 January 2019, the General Staff and the Joint Forces Command were merged to create the Defence Forces Command. On 1 January 2023 it was renamed to General Staff.

The current chief of general staff is Sándor Zsolt.

== List of officeholders ==
=== Royal Hungarian Army (1922−1945) ===
No.	Portrait	Chief of the General Staff	Took office	Left office	Time in office	Ref.
1	Viktor Lorx [hu]	Lieutenant general Viktor Lorx (1873–1922)	4 January 1922	29 June 1922 †	176 days	–
2	Kocsárd Janky	Cavalry general Kocsárd Janky (1868–1954)	25 October 1922	26 May 1930	7 years, 331 days	–
3	Vilmos Rőder	Infantry general Vilmos Rőder (1881–1969)	26 May 1930	16 January 1935	4 years, 235 days	–
4	József Somkuthy	Infantry general József Somkuthy (1883–1961)	16 January 1935	5 September 1936	1 year, 233 days	–
5	Jenő Rátz	Lieutenant general Jenő Rátz (1882–1949)	5 September 1936	24 May 1938	1 year, 261 days	–
6	Lajos Keresztes-Fischer	Lieutenant general Lajos Keresztes-Fischer (1884–1948)	24 May 1938	29 September 1938	128 days	–
7	Henrik Werth	General; Henrik Werth (1881–1952)	29 September 1938	4 September 1941	2 years, 340 days	–
8	Ferenc Szombathelyi	Colonel general Ferenc Szombathelyi (1887–1946)	4 September 1941	19 April 1944	2 years, 228 days	–
9	János Vörös	Colonel general János Vörös (1891–1968)	10 May 1944	16 October 1944	159 days	–
10	Károly Beregfy	Colonel general Károly Beregfy (1888–1946)	16 October 1944	30 April 1945	196 days	–

=== Hungarian People's Army (1945−1990) ===
No.	Portrait	Chief of the General Staff	Took office	Left office	Time in office	Ref.
1	János Vörös	Colonel general János Vörös (1891–1968)	15 November 1945	1 September 1946	290 days	–
Vacant; 1946–1948
2	László Sólyom [hu]	Lieutenant general László Sólyom (1908–1950)	1948	20 May 1950	1–2 years	–
3	István Bata	Lieutenant general István Bata (1910–1982)	20 May 1950	10 August 1953	3 years, 82 days	–
4	Béla Székely	Major general Béla Székely	11 August 1953	22 November 1954	1 year, 103 days	–
5	Lajos Tóth [hu]	Major general Lajos Tóth (1922–2012)	22 November 1954	October 1956	1 year, 10 months	–
6	István Kovács	Major general István Kovács (1911–2011)	October 1956	November 1956	1 month	–
7	László Hegyi	Major general László Hegyi	November 1956	1957	0–1 years	–
8	Ferenc Ugrai [hu]	Lieutenant general Ferenc Ugrai (1922–2006)	1957	1963	5–6 years	
9	Károly Csémi [hu]	Lieutenant general Károly Csémi (1922–1992)	1963	19 January 1973	9–10 years	
10	István Oláh	Colonel general István Oláh (1926–1985)	19 January 1973	6 December 1984	11 years, 322 days	
11	József Pacsek [hu]	Lieutenant general József Pacsek (1928–2009)	6 December 1984	1 December 1989	4 years, 360 days	
12	László Borsits [hu]	Lieutenant general László Borsits (born 1939)	1 December 1989	1 March 1990	90 days	

=== Honvédség (1990−present) ===
The military is called Magyar Honvédség since the end of communism in Hungary.

No.	Portrait	Chief of the General Staff	Took office	Left office	Time in office	Ref.
1	László Borsits [hu]	Lieutenant general László Borsits (born 1939)	1 March 1990	8 September 1991	1 year, 191 days	
2	János Deák	Colonel general János Deák	9 September 1991	31 October 1994	3 years, 52 days	
3	Sándor Németh	Lieutenant general Sándor Németh	1 November 1994	5 June 1996	1 year, 217 days	
4	Ferenc Végh [hu]	Lieutenant general Ferenc Végh (born 1948)	6 June 1996	31 July 1999	3 years, 56 days	
5	Lajos Fodor	Colonel general Lajos Fodor (born 1947)	1 August 1999	28 February 2003	3 years, 211 days	
6	Zoltán Szenes	Lieutenant general Zoltán Szenes (born 1951)	1 March 2003	31 January 2005	1 year, 336 days	
7	András Havril [hu]	Colonel general András Havril (born 1951)	1 February 2005	15 January 2009	3 years, 349 days	
8	László Tömböl [hu]	Colonel general László Tömböl (born 1957)	16 January 2009	5 June 2010	1 year, 140 days	
9	Tibor Benkő	Colonel general Tibor Benkő (born 1957)	6 June 2010	16 May 2018	7 years, 344 days	
10	Ferenc Korom	Colonel general Ferenc Korom (born 1964)	16 May 2018	1 June 2021	3 years, 16 days	
11	Romulusz Ruszin-Szendi	Lieutenant general Romulusz Ruszin-Szendi (born 1973)	3 June 2021	27 April 2023	1 year, 328 days	
12	Gábor Böröndi	Colonel general Gábor Böröndi (born 1971)	27 April 2023	31 May 2026	3 years, 34 days	
12	Sándor Zsolt	Colonel general Sándor Zsolt (born 1968)	1 June 2026	Incumbent	98 days	

== See also ==
- Minister of Defence (Hungary)
