= Lajos Fodor =

Hungarian military officer and diplomat

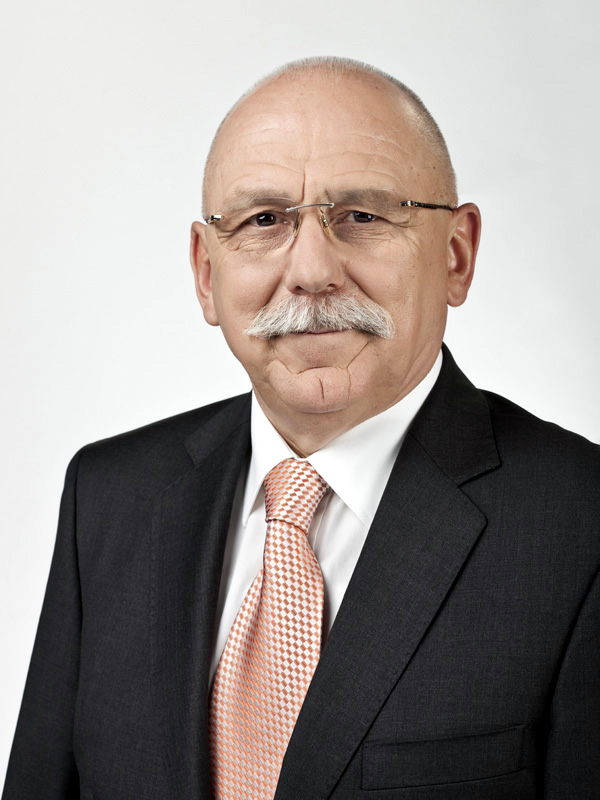
- Born: 27 July 1947 (age 79); Debrecen, Hungary
- Military career
- Allegiance: Hungary
- Service years: 1970–1999; 1999–2003
- Rank: Colonel General
- Commands: General Staff of the Armed Forces of the Republic of Hungary
- Awards: Commander's Cross of the Order of Merit of the Republic of Hungary

Col. Gen. Lajos Fodor (born 27 July 1947) is a retired Hungarian military officer and diplomat, who served as the Chief of the General Staff of the Armed Forces of the Republic of Hungary from 1 August 1999 to 28 February 2003.

== Career ==
Fodor functioned as First Deputy Chief of General Staff from 1996 to 1999, in this capacity, he had a significant role in Hungary's accession to the North Atlantic Treaty Organization (NATO). He served as Deputy Secretary of State for Defence Policy between 15 February and 31 July 1999, under Minister János Szabó. He suspended his military service for that short time. He was appointed Chief of the General Staff and promoted to Colonel General by President Árpád Göncz on 1 August 1999. He also served as Commander of the Hungarian Army until 2001, when the General Staff was integrated to the Ministry of Defence and the military's command function abolished. His relationship with the new Minister Ferenc Juhász has broken down in 2002. Ferenc Mádl acquitted him from his position on 28 February 2003. He was awarded Commander's Cross of the Order of Merit of the Republic of Hungary then.

After that he entered the diplomatic career, when he was appointed Hungarian Ambassador to Australia and New Zealand. He held that function until 2007. He became Secretary of State for Administration under Defence Minister Csaba Hende in the Second Cabinet of Viktor Orbán. He was replaced by István Dankó on 31 January 2013.

== Promotions ==
Fodor's promotions according to his CV:

- 1970 – Lieutenant
- 1974 – Captain
- 1979 – Major
- 1983 – Lieutenant Colonel
- 1986 – Colonel
- 1992 – Major General
- 1997 – Lieutenant General
- 1999 – Colonel General

== Awards and decorations ==

1st row	Hungarian Order of Merit Commanders's Cross with Star on military ribbon	Merit Medal for Service Gold Cross	Merit Medal for Service Silver Cross	Service Medals for Officers (Hungary) 1st class
2nd row	Medal for Service to the Country (HPR) Gold Medal	Medal for Service to the Country (HPR) Gold Medal	Medal for Service to the Country (HPR) Silver Medal	Meritorious Service Medal HPR (1964) for 25 years service
3rd row	Meritorious Service Medal HPR (1964) for 20 years service	Meritorious Service Medal HPR (1964) for 15 years service	Meritorious Service Medal HPR (1964) for 10 years service	Commander of the Legion of Merit
4th row	Hungarian "Honours for the Alliance" Military Award	Foreign Warsaw Pact medal	Medal of Merit for Friendship Gold Medal	Medal "For Strengthening of Brotherhood in Arms"

- Order of John Hunyadi (2001)

== Sources ==
- Official CV

Military offices
Preceded by Col. Gen. Ferenc Végh	Chief of the General Staff; 1 August 1999 – 28 February 2003	Succeeded by Lt. Gen. Zoltán Szenes
