= Jenő Rátz =

Hungarian military officer and politician

His Excellency Jenő Rátz de Nagylak
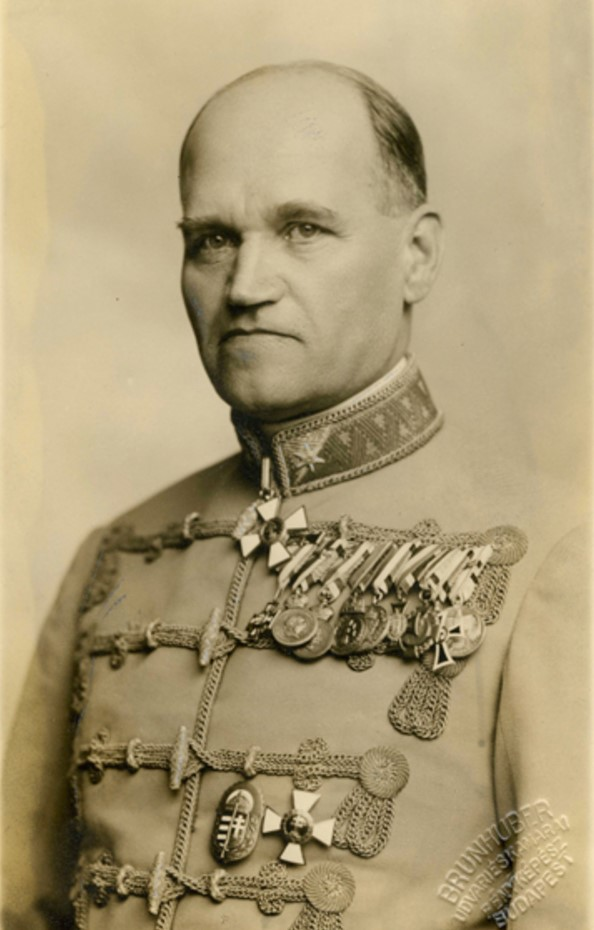
- Formal portrait, 1936

Deputy Prime Minister of the Kingdom of Hungary
- In office 22 March 1944 – 29 August 1944
- Prime Minister: Döme Sztójay
- Preceded by: Office not used
- Succeeded by: Office not used

Minister of Defence of Hungary
- In office 14 May 1938 – 15 November 1938
- Prime Minister: Béla Imrédy
- Preceded by: Vilmos Rőder
- Succeeded by: Károly Bartha

Speaker of the House of Magnates
- In office 8 November 1944 – 28 March 1945
- Preceded by: Zsigmond Perényi
- Succeeded by: Office abolished

Personal details
- Born: 20 September 1882 Nagybecskerek, Austria-Hungary (today Zrenjanin, Serbia)
- Died: 21 January 1952 (aged 69) Vác, People's Republic of Hungary
- Party: MMP
- Other political affiliations: Unity Party

Military service
- Allegiance: Austria-Hungary; Kingdom of Hungary
- Years of service: 1904–1945
- Rank: Lieutenant general
- Battles/wars: World War I World War II

Vitéz Jenő Rátz de Nagylak (born Jenő Ratiu, 20 September 1882 – 21 January 1952) was a Hungarian military officer and politician, who served as Minister of Defence in 1938.

A descendant of an old Romanian Greek Catholic noble family from Transylvania, he fought in the First World War. During the Hungarian Soviet Republic, he served in the National Army. From 1 October 1936, he became Chief of the General Staff of the Royal Hungarian Army (Magyar Királyi Honvédség). Béla Imrédy appointed him as Minister of Defence. After that, he was a representative in the House of Representatives of Hungary. During the cabinet of Döme Sztójay, he was a minister without portfolio and Deputy Prime Minister. After the war the People's Tribunal sentenced Rátz to death by firing squad; however, his sentence was later reduced to life imprisonment. He died in prison in 1952.

== Notes ==
Political offices
Preceded by Vilmos Rőder	Minister of Defence; 1938	Succeeded by Károly Bartha
Preceded by Zsigmond Perényi	Speaker of the House of Magnates; 1944–1945	Succeeded by office abolished
Military offices
Preceded by Colonel-General József Somkuthy	Chief of the General Staff; 1 October 1936 – 24 May 1938	Succeeded by Lieutenant-General Lajos Keresztes-Fischer
