= Lajos Keresztes-Fischer =

Hungarian military officer

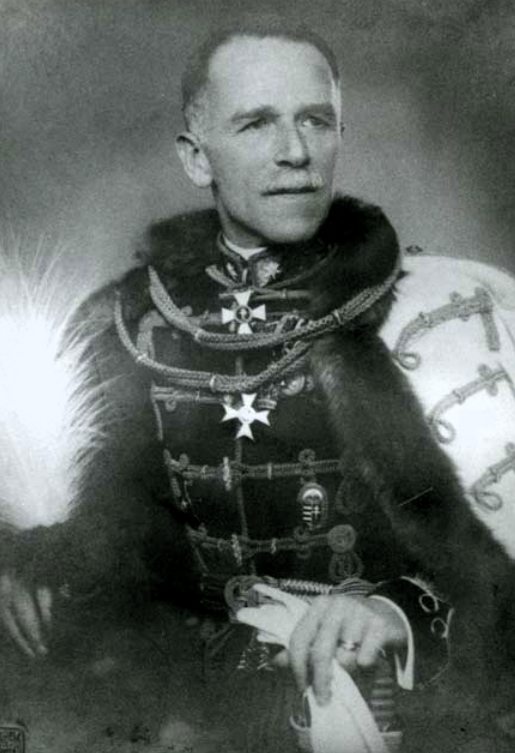
- Born: 8 January 1884; Pécs, Austria-Hungary
- Died: 29 April 1948 (aged 64); Vöcklabruck, Austria
- Military career
- Allegiance: Kingdom of Hungary
- Rank: Lieutenant-General
- Commands: General Staff
- Conflicts: World War I World War II

Lajos Keresztes-Fischer (8 January 1884 – 29 April 1948) was a Hungarian military officer, who served as Chief of the General Staff in 1938. His older brother was Ferenc Keresztes-Fischer, a politician and Minister of the Interior.

== Career ==
He participated in the First World War. He served for the Supreme Command of Miklós Horthy's National Army in 1919. He was a significant supporter of Horthy, he was assigned to the Military Office of the Regent in 1920.

Between 1920 and 1925 he served as Deputy Chief of the Military Chancellery. From 1925 to 1929 he was the Chief of 4th Section Bureau VI of the Ministry of Defence. Between 1929 and 1931 he was charged as Commanding Officer of the Infantry 6th Mixed Brigade. After that he was commanding the 1st Cavalry Brigade from 1931 to 1933. Between 1933 and 1935 he served as Deputy Chief of the General Staff. Since 1933 he was the Aide-de-Camp to the Regent. Keresztes-Fischer held this office until 1941.

From 1935 to 1938 he served as Chief of the Military Chancellery. He became Chief of General Staff for several months when his predecessor Lieutenant-General Jenő Rátz was appointed Minister of Defence in the cabinet of Béla Imrédy. In 1938 he became Chief of the Military Chancellery again. During the first years of the Second World War he served as Adjutant-General of the Military Chancellery. He was retired in 1943.

During the Arrow Cross Party's coup (15–16 October 1944) he was arrested and imprisoned in the Dachau concentration camp by the Gestapo along with his brother. Since 1945 he lived in emigration. He died on 29 April 1948, just two months after the death of Ferenc Keresztes-Fischer.

Military offices
Preceded by Lieutenant-General Jenő Rátz	Chief of the General Staff; 24 May 1938 – 29 September 1938	Succeeded by General Henrik Werth
