= József Somkuthy =

Hungarian military officer and politician

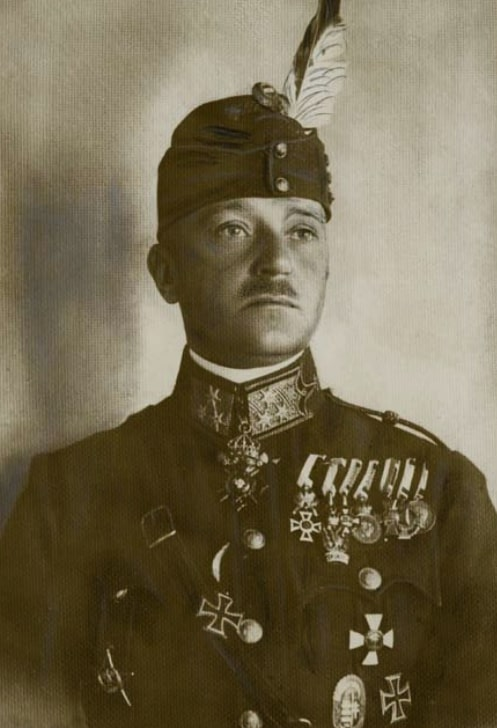
- Born: 20 April 1883; Folt, Kingdom of Hungary
- Died: 18 October 1961 (aged 78); Washington, D.C., United States
- Military career
- Allegiance: Austria-Hungary; Kingdom of Hungary
- Service years: 1903–1936
- Rank: Colonel General
- Conflicts: World War I

József Somkuthy (20 April 1883 – 18 October 1961) was a Hungarian military officer and politician, who served as Minister of Defence for a month in 1936. From 1935 he was the Chief of Army Staff. After the death of Gyula Gömbös he resigned along with the whole members of the cabinet. He was retired. He emigrated to the United States in 1950, settling in Washington, D.C.

Political offices
Preceded by Miklós Kozma	Minister of Defence; 1936	Succeeded by Vilmos Rőder
Military offices
Preceded by Colonel-General Kamilló Kárpáthy	Chief of the General Staff; January 1935 – 2 September 1936	Succeeded by Lieutenant-General Jenő Rátz
