= Henrik Werth =

Hungarian military officer

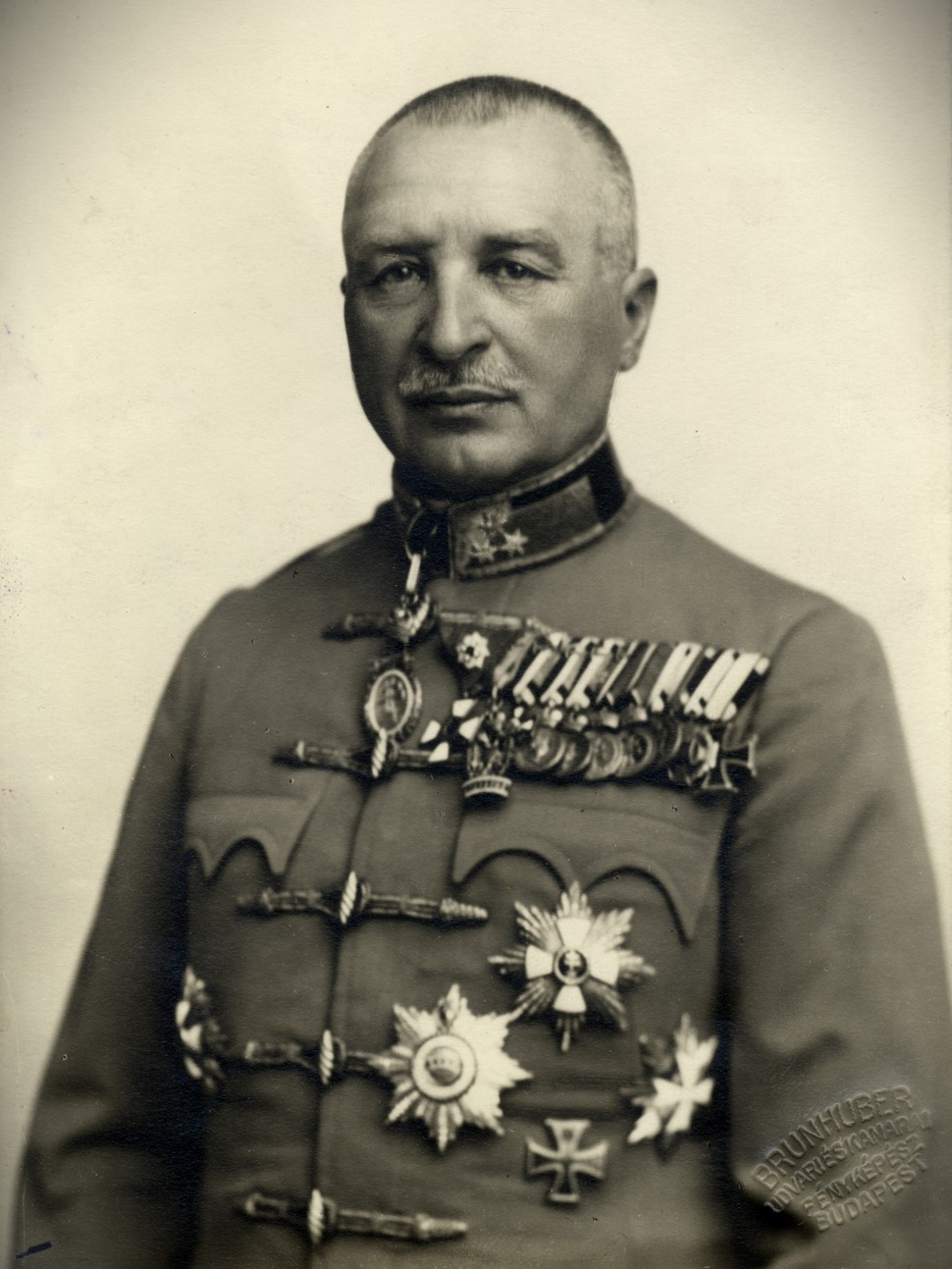
- Born: 26 December 1881; Rezsőháza, Kingdom of Hungary
- Died: 28 May 1952 (aged 70); Soviet Union
- Military career
- Allegiance: Austria-Hungary; Hungarian Soviet Republic; Kingdom of Hungary
- Service years: 1897 - 1941
- Rank: General
- Conflicts: World War I Hungarian-Romanian War; World War II

Henrik Werth (26 December 1881 – 28 May 1952) was a Hungarian military officer, who served as Chief of Army Staff during World War II.

== Officer ==
Henrik Werth was born in Rezsőháza, Hungary (Knićanin, today in Serbia), on 26 December 1881. He became a military cadet in the Austro-Hungarian Army in 1897 in Vienna, and rapidly advanced in rank during World War I. By 1918, he was a lieutenant colonel. He later served the Hungarian Soviet Republic after the collapse of Austria-Hungary as the commander of the Hungarian Red Army's I Army Corps before being given command of the 7th Infantry Division. The Vyx-note of March 1919 which had called for Hungarian forces to pull back had created much revulsion in Hungary as it was believed that the new military lines called by the Vyx note would be the new frontiers of Hungary. Béla Kun had came to power by promising the aid of Soviet Russia in resisting the Allies against the Vyx note. Werth served the Hungarian Red Army of the Hungarian Soviet Republic not out of an attraction to Communism, but to fight against the projected loss of Hungarian territory to Yugoslavia, Romania and Czechoslovakia. In June 1919, Werth defected over to the National Army based in Szeged led by Admiral Miklós Horthy that had been established to fight against the Soviet Republic.

Werth continued serving after the fall of the communist regime, being promoted to colonel in 1920, and to major general in 1926. He taught at the general staff academy and briefly served as the chief of operations on the general staff during that time. Werth was given mandatory retirement at age of 55, which he reached in 1936. However, he was recalled up into service in 1938 and became the chief of general staff.

== Chief of the General Staff ==
The decision to appoint him Chief of the General Staff was taken by the Regent of Hungary, Admiral Miklós Horthy and the prime minister at the time, Béla Imrédy, was not consulted. As a condition for accepting the appointment, Werth asked for the post of Commander-in-chief of the Army to be abolished, making him the sole head of the Honved (Royal Hungarian Army), a request that was granted by the Regent with Horthy retaining the post of Supreme Commander-in-chief of all the Hungarian armed forces for himself. Werth was a "Swabian" as the volksdeutsche (ethnic Germans) living in the Banat region were known as their families were believed to have originated in the Swabia region of Germany and through he was fluent in Magyar, his first language was German. He was married to a German woman, and Werth had such extreme Germanophile views to the point that in the 1941 census he listed his nationality as "German" instead of Hungarian. Other Honved officers accused Werth of having divided loyalties with many feeling he was more loyal to his ancestral homeland of Germany rather than to Hungary. The majority of the Honved generals were Swabians. Of the 27 two-star and three-star Honved generals in 1941, 21 were volksdeutsche. The dominance of the Swabians in the officer corps was due to the tendency of the Swabians to apply to be officers out of all proportion to their numbers in the general population. Furthermore, the language of command in the Imperial Austrian and Royal Hungarian Army had been German, a requirement that favored the Swabians over the speakers of Magyar who had to learn German.

During his time as chief of the General Staff, Werth had pressed very strongly for an alliance with the Reich. Along with the Defense Minister, Károly Bartha, Werth was the leading advocate in Budapest of an alliance with Germany, whose government he greatly admired. Werth had close ties with the German military and Horthy retained him as chief of the general staff largely because of close friendships with a number of leading Wehrmacht generals, which was felt to be useful for making Hungary's case in Berlin. He was greatly disappointed when the pro-Nazi radical prime minister Béla Imrédy was forced to resign because he inconveniently turned out to be the descendent of Jews who had converted to Christianity and expressed much opposition to Imrédy's conservative successor Pál Teleki. In March 1939, he oversaw the invasion and annexation of the recently proclaimed Carpatho-Ukraine, which just broken away from Czecho-Slovakia. Werth wanted a week to prepare to invade the Republic of Carpatho-Ukraine, but received a message from Berlin that Hitler wanted the Hungarians to invade Carpatho-Ukraine before there was any chance of diplomatic recognition, forcing him to launch a hastily prepared invasion. Despite the hastly invasion, the Republic of Carpatho-Ukraine did not much of an army, and the Honved rapidly overrun the new republic. In Ruthenia as the Hungarians renamed Carpatho-Ukraine, martial law was in effect and Werth carried out "a through cleaning" as he called it, imprisoning Ukrainian nationalists in concentration camps.

In May 1939, prime minister, Pál Teleki had created labour service battalions in the Honved to which Hungarian Jews and other "unreliable" elements in Hungarian life such as the Roma, members of "non-national" churches such as Seventh Day Adventists and Jehovah's Witnesses, leftists and homosexuals were to serve instead of serving in the regular battalions of the Honved. The labour service battalions engaged in construction work for the Honved and were not issued arms. In April 1940, Werth changed the rules for the labour service battalions to make life harsher for those drafted into the labour service such as increasing the work hours while decreasing their rations. The men serving in the Labour Service Battalions were slaves in everything but name, and were treated with much brutality by their officers with many serving in the Labour Service battalions being allowed to stave to death or dying of exhaustion.

During the Danzig crisis in the spring and summer of 1939, Horthy did not expect that Britain and France would declare war if Germany invaded Poland, which he believed would create an opening for Hungary to invade Romania with the aim of taking back Transylvania. Romania had signed a treaty of alliance with France in 1926 and on 13 April 1939 had its territory "guaranteed" by Britain and France, meaning that any Hungarian attack on Romania would result in Anglo-French declarations of war on Hungary. Horthy believed that if Britain and France did nothing if Germany invaded Poland, that would so discredit both nations that Hungary could invade Romania without fear of Anglo-French action and led him to direct Werth to begin preparations for a war against Romania to be launched in the near-future. As Adolf Hitler had only allowed Hungary to annex certain parts of Czechoslovakia in 1938-1939 in exchange for a series of economic agreements that turned Hungary into a German economic satellite, Horthy did not want German help in the planned war against Romania and directed Werth to hold talks with Italy on the subject. In early July 1939, Werth visited Berlin where his requests for German military aid in modernising the Honved was rejected. Frustratingly for him, the Reich was selling weapons to Hungary's enemies, Romania and Yugoslavia, in exchange for economic treaties that turned both nations into German economic satellites. Werth was told quite bluntly that Germany needed Romanian oil and wheat along with Yugoslav copper and bauxite and that took precedence over Hungary's desire to undo the Treaty of Trianon. On 18 July 1939, Werth arrived in Rome to hold staff talks with his Italian counterpart, General Alberto Pariani. On 3 August 1939, Werth returned to Italy for more talks with Pariani. During the Werth-Pariani meetings, the latter told the former quite outrageous lies about Italian plans for an invasions of the Balkans with Italian troops marching into Yugoslavia and Greece with the aim of linking up with the Hungarians, plans that were well beyond Italy's capabilities as Pariani knew quite well. The American historian Brian Sullivan wrote that Werth came as naïve and gullible as Pariani outlined increasingly outlandish plans for Italo-Hungarian joint operations in the Balkans that he refused to put into writing, ostensibly for reasons of security, that Werth seemed inclined to accept at face value.

When Germany invaded Poland on 1 September 1939, Werth was bitterly opposed to Teleki's "zig-zag" neutrality of leaning first in the direction of a pro-Polish neutrality and then leaning in a pro-German neutrality. Werth was greatly upset at Teleki's refusal of German transit rights to invade Poland along with welcoming Polish refugees into Hungary. Werth told the German military attache in Budapest that his government should apply pressure to have a more "reasonable" government than the one headed by Teleki and at a meeting in October 1939 he threatened to resign in protest against Teleki's foreign policy. In June 1940, Teleki tried to persuade Horthy to sack Werth under the grounds he was meddling in political matters that were beyond his area of responsibilities. Werth was extremely harkwish about the prospect of a war with Romania during the Transylvania crisis of 1940, declared a total mobilisation of the Honved on 23 August 1940 and told the council of ministers that his forces would be ready to invade Romania on 28 August 1940.

Under the Hungarian system, Werth reported to the Defense Minister Károly Bartha and directly to the Regent, Admiral Horthy, who served as a "Supreme War Lord" as the office of Supreme Commander in Chief was titled in Hungary. Werth did not report to Teleki and conducted military affairs in a manner that was often opposed to Teleki's policy of maintaining a pro-Axis neutrality vs. Werth's expressed desire to have Hungary enter the war as a one of the Axis powers. Teleki complained that Werth was seeking to undermine his government's policies and in a resignation letter he sent to Admiral Horthy in September 1940 charged that Hungary had two governments, one civil and one military. Teleki went on to write that with the military government headed by Werth "the influence of which is growing in almost every branch of the administration and which the legal government is unable to supervise". In particular, Teleki noted that the Ministry of Finance had no control over the military budget and that Werth was constantly seeking to increase the level of military spending with no effort to consult the Finance Ministry at all. Likewise, Teleki complained that the military staff attached to the Ministry of Industry refused to take orders from the Industry Minister and made foreign trade and domestic labour agreements with Germany without consulting the Foreign Ministry or the Industry Ministery. Finally, Teleki charged that the military was conducting its own foreign policy as Werth signed agreements with Germany on military and economic matters without informing anyone in the Foreign Affairs, Industry and Trade ministries, who only learned after the fact what agreements Werth had signed. Werth was keen to accelerate Hungarian rearmament from the restrictions imposed by the Treaty of Trianon as quickly as possible, and was constantly in Berlin seeking to sign new contracts to supply German weapons to the Honved. In his pursuit of more German arms contracts, Werth was quite willing to sign economic agreements that were unfavorable to Hungary in exchange for more German weapons, a practice that greatly embittered the staff at the Foreign Affairs, Finance, Trade and Industry ministries who all charged that Werth would sign any sort of economic agreements in exchange for more German arms. Horthy refused Teleki's resignation and told the prime minister that he just needed to learn to co-operate more with Werth, whose leadership Horthy still supported.

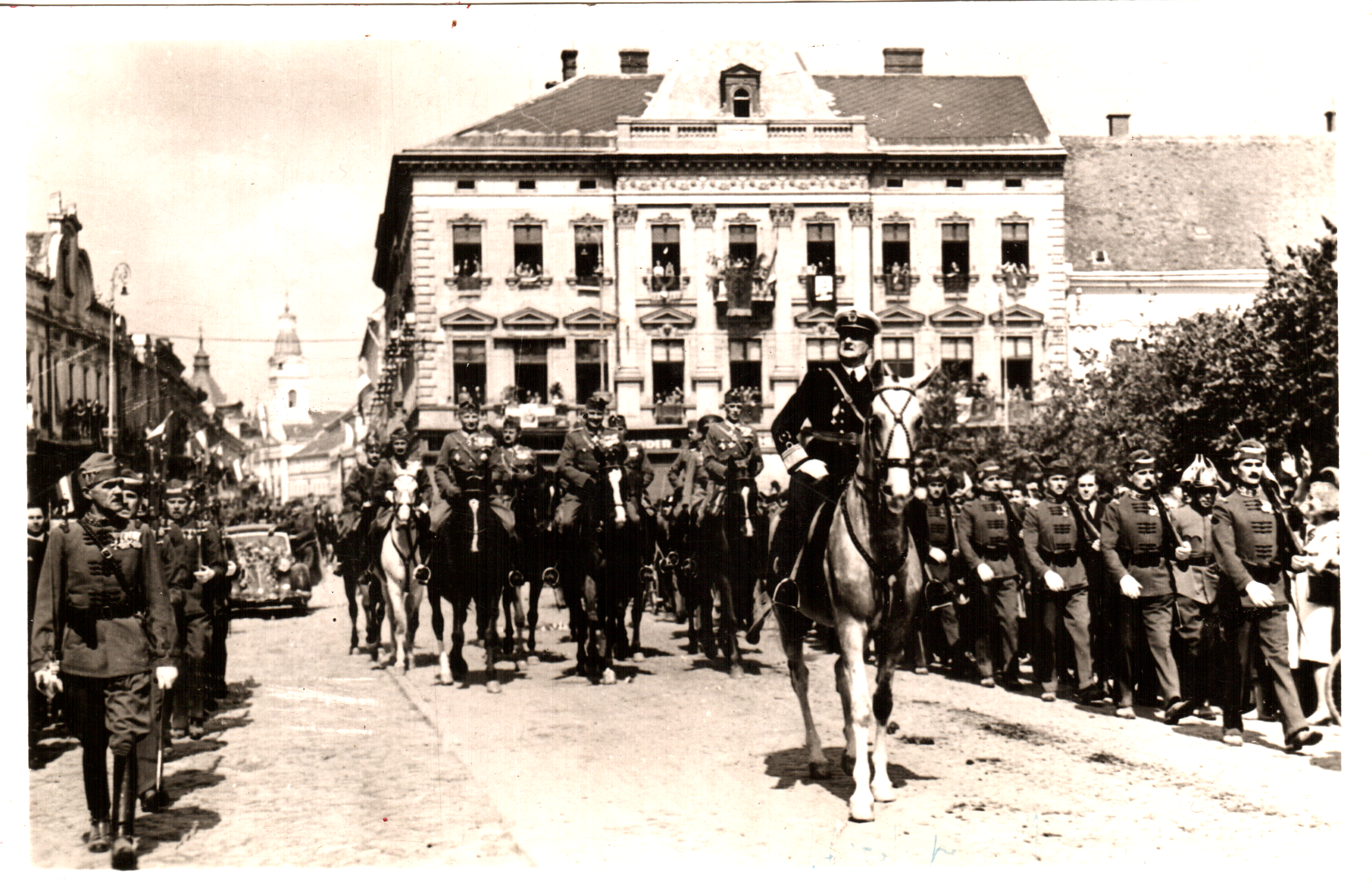
Admiral Horthy leads a parade marching into Szatmárnémeti (modern Satu Mare, Romania), 5 September 1940. Werth is riding the horse in the rear on the left and to the right is the Defense Minister Károly Bartha. Satu Mare was one of the cities in Transylvania that Hungary regained under the Second Vienna Award of 1940.

Relations between Teleki and Werth were also strained over the issue of Transylvania. Under the Second Vienna Award, Hungary had been allowed to reannex northern Transylvania while southern Transylvania remained part of Romania. Northern Transylvania had been placed under martial law pending the introduction of civilian rule, and in the interim Werth ruled northern Transylvania. Werth promptly had his soldiers stage massacres of Romanians and Jews in several Transylvanian villages, most notably Szliáyipp and Ôrdokút. Teleki had envisioned having the Lands of the Crown of St. Istvan as a multi-ethnic state and spoken of his desire for Transylvania and Ruthenia to have autonomy under Hungarian rule vs. Werth's wish for a centralised state with no autonomy for any regions. On 29 September 1940, Horthy summoned Teleki, Werth and Bartha to the Royal Castle to discuss the disputes between the prime minister and the military. Horthy as usual sided with the military against the civilians on most of the issues, but he ruled in Teleki's favor on several issues. The regent declared that Werth could not longer present military budgets which could not be altered by the Ministry of Finance, saying that Werth would have to adjust the level of military spending to Hungary's financial capabilities to pay for the said budgets. Horthy also ruled that the martial law in northern Transylvania would end on 26 November 1940 and that on that day civilian rule would come into effect.

== The Invasion of Yugoslavia ==
Of German ancestry, he supported Hungary's entry into World War II and believed that Hungary could profit from helping the Germans.

On 27 March 1941, a bloodless coup de etat led by General Dušan Simović overthrow the Prince Regent Paul in protest over Yugoslavia signing the Tripartite Pact. The new government in Belgrade promised to abide by the Tripartite Pact, but Adolf Hitler was furious with the coup and ordered an invasion of Yugoslavia under the grim codename Operation Punishment. As the most direct route to Belgrade was down the Danube river valley, the Germans promptly asked the Hungarians for transit rights to invade Yugoslavia. When Teleki reluctantly allowed Werth to open preliminary talks with the German General Staff, Werth ignored his brief and instead signed with General Friedrich Paulus, the deputy chief of the German general staff, a plan for a full German-Hungarian invasion of Yugoslavia which he presented to the Council of Ministers on 30 March 1941. More importantly, Werth also granted the Germans transit rights to invade Yugoslavia and allowed Wehrmacht force to enter Hungary, a decision that was his not his to make, which very much angered Teleki who complained that the chief of general staff just made a decision that properly was the responsibility of the prime minister. Werth also agreed for a full mobilisation of the Honved, which meant calling up thousands of farmers serving as reservists at a time when heavy spring rains had caused much flooding in the countryside, which threatened the 1941 crop. He further agreed with Paulus that when Hungary invaded Yugoslavia, the Honved would not only occupy the former Hungarian lands, but was to enter the land that had belonged to the Kingdom of Serbia in 1914. Teleki complained that Werth had exceeded his authority in granting Germany transit rights into Hungary, but did not dare countermend Werth's decision least he enrage Hitler who would not have been happy to have Teleki say that Werth did not have the legal authority to give the Wehrmacht transit rights into Hungary.

In April 1941, Werth supported Hungary taking part in the invasion of Yugoslavia with the aim of recovering the lands lost to Yugoslavia under the Treaty of Trianon. At a meeting of the Council of Ministers in Budapest on 1 April 1941, the Foreign Minister László Bárdossy and the Interior Minister Ferenc Keresztes-Fischer spoke in favor of a limited invasion of Yugoslavia independent of the German invasion of Yugoslavia with the aim of occupying certain Magyar majority districts in the Banat and the Bácska. Werth, supported by the Defense Minister Károly Bartha argued for Hungary joining forces with the Reich in a full invasion of Yugoslavia. The prime minister Teleki was opposed to the invasion, warning that to invade Yugoslavia would mean a break with Britain that he would predicated would lead to a disaster as he believed that Britain would win the war. Teleki argued that since the American Congress had just ratified the Lend-Lease agreement that Britain had the full support of the United States and that the Anglo-American alliance would ultimately defeat Germany. At the meeting, Werth presented the agreement he had signed with Paulus as a fait accompli, saying he signed the agreement with the Germans on behalf of Hungary. In opposition to the prime minister, both Bartha and Werth stated that Hungary must not pass up the chance to take back all of the lands lost to Yugoslavia as he believed that Hitler's failure to return all the lands lost to Czechoslovakia had been caused by Hungary's lukewarm attitude to attacking Czechoslovakia in 1938. The foreign minister Bárdossy was opposed to the way that Werth had taken on a task that was properly the province of the Ministry of Foreign Affairs while Teleki persuaded Horthy to make some changes to the plan. Horthy as the "Supreme War Lord" declared that he would decide whatever to mobilise or not, and that the Honved was not to enter the lands that had belonged to Serbia in 1914. The prime minister had argued successfully to Horthy that Werth's plan for full mobilisation was reckless as the farmers serving as reservists were needed to save the 1941 crop from the floods.

Teleki had in December 1940 signed a Treaty of Eternal Friendship with the Yugoslav Regent Prince Paul of Yugoslavia under which Hungary accepted the frontiers created by the Treaty of Trianon in exchange for allow ethnic Magyars in Yugoslavia to be educated in their own language instead of Serbo-Croatian, which had been one of the most difficult issues in Yugoslav-Hungarian relations. Teleki felt that his honor as a gentleman meant that Hungary could not just violate the Treaty of Eternal Friendship by attacking Yugoslavia. Adding to Teleki's worries was a cable that Bárdossy received from György Barcza, the Hungarian minister plenipotentiary in London, which Bárdossy in turn showed to Teleki. Barcza reported that he just spoken with Prime Minister Winston Churchill and the Foreign Secretary Anthony Eden, who were both furious that Hungary had granted Germany transit rights and that Wehrmacht divisions had already entered Hungary in preparation to invade Yugoslavia. Barcza stated that the British were going to break diplomatic relations with Hungary over the granting of transit rights and might even declare war. Bárdossy was blase about Barcza's cable, saying that Britain was a declining power whom Germany was going to defeat, but Teleki was deeply depressed over the news. Teleki complained that Werth had vastly exceeded his authority in granting Germany transit rights and had now put Hungary on a collusion course with the mighty British empire.

The majority of the council of ministers came out in favor of an invasion of Yugoslavia, an issue that Teleki felt so strongly about that he committed suicide on 3 April 1941 in protest of the council's decision. In his suicide note addressed to Horthy, Teleki wrote: "Your Serene Highness; we have become breakers of our word-out of cowardice-in defiance of the Treaty of Eternal Friendship based on the Mohacs speech...We have placed ourselves at the side of scoundrels...We shall be robbers of corpses! The most abominable nation. I did not keep your back. I am guilty. April 3, 1941, Pal Teleki". After finishing his note in the prime minister's office, Teleki shot himself in the head. Bárdossy succeeded Teleki as prime minister. At a meeting of the council of ministers on 6 April 1941, Werth spoke in favor of not only invading Yugoslavia, but also Romania as well with the aim of taking back all of Transylvania, a suggestion that was not taken up. Much to Werth's anger, Bárdossy started the Hungarian invasion on 11 April 1941 and on a scale far smaller than what Werth wanted. Werth ordered that the Honved forces invading Yugoslavia were to treat the Croats in a "friendly manner" while ordering the opposite with regards to the Serbs.

In the part of Yugoslavia that was annexed to Hungary, Werth followed a harsh anti-Serb line. In a pamphlet he wrote that was sent to all Honved soldiers serving in the Bácska entitled "Protection Against Serb Secret Organizations", Werth wrote that all Serbs were "a conspiratorial people, prone to rebellion, violence, even bloody solutions". Werth's constant Serb bashing had the effect of making the Honved soldiers in the Bácska highly nervous as all Serbian civilians were regarded as potential guerrillas and made them far more likely to engage in violence against Serb civilians than otherwise would had been the case. One Honved officer complained that he was shocked by how nervous the men under his men were, saying that Werth had created "an angst and a trembling fear just as unfounded as the fear of the Cossacks at the outbreak of the First World War. As it turned out, in the course of the panic, the soldiers themselves began shooting...to the point that some units had to order new munitions from the corps commander." Between April–September 1941, 126 Hungarian soldiers and gendarmes had been killed in Serb guerrilla attacks in the Bácska and another 246 had been wounded while the Hungarian authorities had executed 3, 000 Serbs in retaliation.

== Operation Barbarossa ==
From his contacts with the Wehrmacht generals, Werth had at least some idea that Germany was going to invade the Soviet Union and he ordered preparations accordingly to bring Hungary into the war when it started. In early May 1941, Werth gave orders to the General Staff to start preparing for the "offensive-minded defense" against the Soviet Union. In his memo on the subject dated 6 May 1941, Werth argued for taking part in an invasion as the best way to recover all of the lands lost under the Treaty of Trianon by winning Hitler's favor. In addition, Werth argued that "Christian-based national worldview" of the Kingdom of Hungary would be betrayed if "we did not join the fight against Bolshevism". In June 1941, Werth pushed very strongly for Hungary to join Operation Barbarossa, the invasion of the Soviet Union which started on 22 June 1941, even through Germany had not asked Hungary to join Operation Barbarossa. Hitler and the Wehrmacht generals felt that Hungary's backwardness would ensure that the Honved would be a liability rather than an asset on the Eastern Front and did not feel that Hungary participating in Operation Barbarossa was necessary. Werth was the strongest advocate in Budapest of Hungary joining the war on the Eastern Front, through he was seriously annoyed that Germany had asked Romania and Finland to take part in the invasion, but not Hungary. His primary reason for urging Hungary to join the war against the Soviet Union was his belief that Hitler would favor Romania over Hungary and urged that Hungary take part in the war as the best way of regaining all of Transylvania from the Romanians.

In a memo he wrote right after the German invasion of the Soviet Union, Werth argued that "loyal policies" towards the Reich "would result in the safe return of the complete territory of historical Hungary". Werth had an unlimited faith in the power of Nazi Germany to win the war and predicated that the war against the Soviet Union would be a short one, saying that the longest the Red Army could hope to last against the Wehrmacht would be six weeks and that Hungarian losses on the Eastern Front would be extremely low.

Following the Bombing of Kassa on 26 June 1941, Werth immediately accused the Soviet Union of the bombing and promptly advised the council of ministers to declare war on the Soviet Union at once. At about 2: 30 pm on 26 June, Werth along with Defense Minister Bartha saw Horthy at his residence in the Royal Castle, who accepted at face value the claims of Werth and Bartha that the Soviet Union was responsible and that war should be declared, which occurred the next day on 27 June when Bárdossy told the Diet that Hungary was now at war. The Hungarian historian Nandor Dreisziger wrote that Horthy was an impulsive and rash man, prone to acting first and thinking second, and that the regent needed someone like the former prime minister István Bethlen to advise him. Bethlen was usually the voice of reason and calm who talked Horthy out of his more reckless plans as he did numerous times during his time as prime minister between 1921-1931. The account of the bombing of Kassa given to Horthy by Werth and Bartha had pushed Horthy into a state of high excitement, but this time Bethlen was not present with his place occupied by Bárdossy who did nothing to argue against the Defense Minister and the chief of the general staff. Dreisziger argued that if Bethlen still been serving as prime minister in 1941 instead of Bárdossy, he might had been able to talk Horthy of going to war against the Soviet Union. Bethlen had in fact written Horthy a letter advising him against declaring war on the Soviet Union, saying the bombing of Kassa was probably an accident, which Horthy did not read until after Bárdossy declared war. Bethlen wrote that he was against war, saying that a war would mean for Hungary "sacrificing the flower of her people" on the Eastern Front. In his letter, Bethlen wrote that he did not share Werth's blind faith in the a Nazi "final victory", writing that a German victory was not inevitable; that the Honved was not ready for war and that Hungarian losses on the Eastern Front would be heavy; and finally that the war would be unpopular with the Hungarian people.

Werth told the council of ministers that the Hungarian soldiers called up for service on the Eastern Front "could return home in time for the harvest" as he believed that the war would be over by the fall of 1941. The American historian Thomas Sakmyster noted that the bombing of Kassa was remarkably similar to the plans for a bombing of a small town in Hungary devised by the General Staff in 1938 to provoke a war with Czechoslovakia. Under a plan created in September 1938 by Lieutenant Colonel Homlok of the General Staff, Royal Hungarian Air Force warplanes were to be painted with the colors of the Czechoslovak Air Force and bomb the military facilities in a provincial town in Hungary with bombs labelled in Czech. The bombing of Kassa was very similar to the sort of bombing that Homlok had wanted in 1938 with the only differences being that the bombers were painted with the colors of the Soviet Air Forces, the bombs found at Kassa were labelled in Russian, and Kassa was not a small town. Sakmyster suggested that Werth had just activated Homlok's plan with the aircraft said to have bombed Hungary being Soviet instead of Czechoslovak.

Werth saw Operation Barbarossa as a chance to engage in ethnic cleansing on a colossal scale as he urged the prime minister László Bárdossy to expel all Jews, Romanians and Slovaks living under Hungarian rule into the Galicia region (modern western Ukraine). The American historian George Eisen wrote that Werth had a "pathological" views about ethnic cleansing as he envisioned expelling all of the non-Magyar peoples from the Kingdom of Hungary with the notable exception of his own minority group, the volksdeutsche. Bárdossy rejected Werth's plan, but approve of a scaled down version under which all Galician Jews living in Hungary (who were widely believed to be all illegal immigrants) would be deported to Galicia. A Hungarian civil servant involved in the deporation, Ámon Pásztóy, testified at his trial for war crimes after the war: "the decree of expulsion was initiated by Henrik Werth, who was not a member of the Council of Ministers, but at that time was also present. On the basis of his suggestion, this proposal was presented to the Cabinet as a motion by Károly Bartha, then minister of defense." In the Ruthenia region annexed to Hungary in March 1939, Werth advocated a harsh line towards the Ukrainian population, whose culture and language he wanted to see stamped out. Ultimately, Werth envisioned expelling all of the Ukrainians from Ruthenia and all of the Romanians from Transylvania to achieve his dream of an ethnically pure greater Hungary. Werth saw both the Jews and the Romani populations of Ruthenia as threats to the Hungarian state, and urged the elimination of both groups from Ruthenia. Bárdossy did not approve of Werth's request and instead allowed only a scaled down operation under which all Jews considered to be illegal immigrants from Galicia would be expelled.

He was later dismissed from his post because of making a promise to the Germans that all Hungarian Army units would be available to them (without the permission of Regent Miklós Horthy). Horthy had soon came to feel that entering the war was a mistake as he noted that the rapid Soviet collapse had failed to occur and decided to dismiss Werth as Werth had been the strongest advocate of having Hungary go all-out in the war on the Eastern Front. When Horthy fired Werth, he noted that Werth had predicated that the Soviet Union would be defeated in only six weeks at the maximum, which had failed to occur. Werth's successor as chief of the general staff, Ferenc Szombathelyi, favored conserving Hungarian forces and limiting Hungary's involvement on the Eastern Front.

The Hungarian historian Igor Romsics wrote that Hungary suffered very greatly as a result of the decision to enter the war as he noted that Hungary was almost completely destroyed during the 8 months of fighting on Hungarian soil in 1944-1945. Budapest, which was regarded before the war as one of Europe's most beautiful and elegant cities, was largely destroyed during the ferocious Battle of Budapest, which was fought between November 1944-February 1945. The destruction of buildings and other property amounted to a sum in pengős that was more than five times the Hungarian national GDP in 1938. The Kingdom of Hungary had about 14.5 million people, of whom 900, 000 (6.2% of the population) were killed in the war. The dead included about 360, 000 soldiers killed in action along with a half million Hungarian Jews who were exterminated in the Holocaust along with another 600, 000 Hungarian soldiers who had to endure Soviet POW camps. The vast majority of the Hungarian soldiers killed in action, wounded or taken prisoner did so while serving on the Eastern Front. The rest of the dead were civilians killed during the fighting in 1944-1945 or were executed by the Arrow Cross regime. Finally, Hungary had to pay crippling reparations to the Soviet Union after the war and lost its independence as the country was incorporated into the Soviet sphere of influence. In conclusion, Romsicis noted that the aim of the Hungarian leaders in entering the war, namely to regain the lands lost by the Treaty of Trianon, was a failure as Hungary ended up under the 1947 Treaty of Paris with almost the precise same frontiers that the Treaty of Trianon had imposed in 1920 with the only difference being that Czechoslovakia gained 3 villages which had been left to Hungary under the Treaty of Trianon. For all these reasons, Romsics argued that the decision to enter the war in June 1941 was a disastrous one that cost Hungary very dearly as all this suffering and pain was in vain, and Hungary ended up with less territory after the war. The Hungarian historian Nicholas Nagy-Talavera wrote the three men who harmed Hungary the most during the war were Werth, Bárdossy and the former prime minister Béla Imrédy, all of whom he blamed for the decision to declare war on the Soviet Union out of the mistaken hope that this would lead to Hitler restoring all of the Lands of the Crown of St. István.

== Later life ==
He was recalled from retirement in February 1945 by the Soviet forces, and was immediately arrested. The Hungarian People's Court sentenced him to death because of war crimes. He was transferred to the USSR where he died in 1952.

== Sources ==
- Profile (search "W" for Werth), Magyar Életrajzi Lexikon; accessed 24 January 2018.
- Bán, András (2004). Hungarian-British Diplomacy 1938-1941 The Attempt to Maintain Relations. London: Taylor & Francis. ISBN 9781135753924.
- Braham, Randolph (1977). The Hungarian labor service system, 1939-1945. New York: Columbia University Press. ISBN 9780914710240.
- Cornelius, Deborah S. (2011). Hungary in World War II Caught in the Cauldron. New York: Fordham University Press. ISBN 9780823237739.
- Csapody, Tamǎs (2026). "Hungarian Labour Servants in Serbia: The History of the Labour Servants in Bor". In Borbála Klacsmann, Dóra Pataricza, Péter Buchmüller (ed.). Hungarian Holocaust Revisited New Discoveries and Insights. Berlin: Walter de Gruyter GmbHþ. pp. 3–30. ISBN 9783111521183.
- Dreisziger, N.F. (2021). "Civil-Military Relations In Nazi Germany's Shadow: the Case of Hungary, 1936-1941". In Adrian Preston & Peter Dennis (ed.). Swords and Covenants Essays in Honour of the Centennial of the Royal Military College of Canada 1876–1976. London: Taylor & Francis. pp. 216–247. ISBN 9781000339062.
- DiNardo, Richard (2005). Germany and the Axis Powers from Coalition to Collapse. Lawrence: University of Kansas Press. ISBN 9780700614127.
- Eisen, George (2023). A Summer of Mass Murder: 1941 Rehearsal for the Hungarian Holocaust. West Lafayette: Purdue University Press.
- Frank, Tibor (2002). "Treaty revision and doublespeak, Hungarian neutrality, 1939-1941". In Neville Wylie (ed.). European Neutrals and Non-Belligerents During the Second World War. Cambridge: Cambridge University Press. p. 150–175.
- Janos, Andrew (2012). The Politics of Backwardness in Hungary, 1825-1945. Princeton: Princeton University Press. ISBN 9781400843022.
- Király, Béla K.; Rothenberg, Gunther E. (1988). War and Society in East Central Europe: Revolutions and interventions in Hungary and its neighbor states, 1918-1919. Boulder: Columbia University Press. ISBN 0880331372.
- Klimo, Arpad von (2018). Remembering Cold Days The 1942 Massacre of Novi Sad and Hungarian Politics and Society, 1942-1989. Pittsburg: University of Pittsburgh Press. ISBN 9780822986096.
- Macartney, C.A (1956). A History of Hungary, 1929-1945. London: F.A. Praeger.
- Nagy-Talavera, Nicholas M. (1970). The Green Shirts and the Others A History of Fascism in Hungary and Rumania. Stanford: Hoover Institution Press. ISBN 9780817918514.
- Romsics, Ignac (2017). "Hungary". In David Stahel (ed.). Joining Hitler's Crusade European Nations and the Invasion of the Soviet Union, 1941. Cambridge: Cambridge University Press. pp. 79–106. ISBN 9781316510346.
- Sakmyster, Thomas L (January 1975). "Army Officers and Foreign Policy in Interwar Hungary, 1918-41". Journal of Contemporary History. 1- (1): 19–40.
- Sajti, Enikő A. (1995). "Hungarian-Croatian interstate relations:(1941-1944)". Acta Historica. 101: 27–36..
- Segal, Raz (2016). Genocide in the Carpathians War, Social Breakdown, and Mass Violence, 1914-1945. Stanford: Stanford University Press. ISBN 9780804798976.
- Shandor, Vikentiĭ (1997). Carpatho-Ukraine in the Twentieth Century A Political and Legal History. Cambridge: Harvard Ukrainian Research Institute.
- Sullivan, Brian (2002). "'Where one man and only one man led', Italy's path from non-alignment to non-belligerency to war, 1937-1940". In Neville Wylie (ed.). European Neutrals and Non-Belligerents During the Second World War. Cambridge: Cambridge University Press. pp. 119–149.

Military offices
Preceded by Lt. Gen. Lajos Keresztes-Fischer	Chief of the General Staff; 29 September 1938 – 31 August 1941	Succeeded by Col. Gen. Ferenc Szombathelyi
