= Károly Bartha =

Hungarian military officer and politician

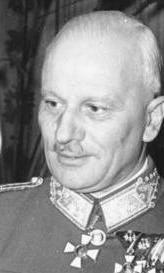
- Born: 18 June 1884; Budapest, Kingdom of Hungary
- Died: 22 November 1964 (aged 80); Linz, Austria
- Military career
- Allegiance: Austria-Hungary; Hungarian Soviet Republic; Kingdom of Hungary
- Service years: 1904-1945
- Rank: Colonel General
- Units: Hungarian Red Army, National Army
- Conflicts: World War I; Hungarian-Romanian War of 1919; World War II

Vitéz Károly Bartha de Dálnokfalva (18 June 1884 – 22 November 1964) was a Hungarian military officer and politician, who served as Minister of Defence between 1938 and 1942.

== Officer ==
During World War I, he had several high commander offices in Budapest and Trieste. In 1919, he fought against the armies of Czechoslovakia and Romania. After the fall of the Hungarian Soviet Republic, Bartha joined the National Army led by Miklós Horthy.

== Minister of Defence ==
The Prime Minister Béla Imrédy appointed him as Minister of Defence and Bartha kept his position in the ensuing governments until 1942. While he was in office, a number of major events took place: the First and Second Vienna Awards, the occupation of Bácska and Prekmurje, and the bombing of Kassa.

On 9 September 1939, the German Foreign Minister Joachim von Ribbentrop told the Hungarian Foreign Minister Count István Csáky that he wanted Hungary to take transit rights to use the railroad around Kassa (modern Košice, Slovaka) to send Wehrmacht forces into Poland, saying that that the Hungarians had one hour to reply and that a negative reply would not be well received in Berlin. The prime minister Pál Teleki called for an emergency meeting where he asked Bartha and the chief of the general staff, General Henrik Werth, to start planning to resist a German invasion as his government was planning to deny the Germans transit rights to invade Poland. The issue turned out to be moot as the Wehrmacht continued to advance so rapidly into Poland that the Kassa railroad was judged unnecessary to win the war. During the Transylvania crisis in the summer of 1940, Bartha favored a hawkish line, saying at a meeting of the council of ministers on 22 August 1940 "...that means that for our part if we start military action Romania will talk differently". Werth, who was equally hawkish about the prospect of a war with Romania, declared a total mobilisation of the Honved on 23 August 1940 and told the council of ministers that his forces would be ready to invade Romania on 28 August 1940. The planned war was cut short by Adolf Hitler as Romania was one of Germany's main sources of oil and to reach Germany Romanian oil had to go through Hungary. Hitler who did not want to be cut off from Romanian oil intervened and called for a summit in Vienna to decide the dispute. On 29–30 August 1940, the dispute was decided at a meeting in the Belvedere Palace with northern Transylvania being returned to Hungary and southern Transylvania staying with Romania, a compromise that displeased both the Hungarians and the Romanians.

In September 1940, Teleki submitted his resignation to Horthy, saying that Werth was an openly subordinate officer who acted like civilian authority did not exist and meddled in matters that were not his concern. Teleki wrote in his resignation letter that Hungary had two governments, one legal and one military, saying with the regards to the latter "the influence of which is growing in almost branch of administration and which the legal government is unable to supervise". On 29 September 1940, Horthy surmoned Teleki, Bartha and Werth to the Royal Castle to resolve the dispute. Horthy refused Teleki's resignation, but made several concessions to him such as declaring marital law in northern Transylvania would end on 26 November 1940 and declared that Werth could not just present military budgets without consulting the Ministry of Finance, saying that Werth would have to adjust the military budget to Hungary's financial capacities.

In January 1941,, Bartha visited Berlin where he was received as a guest by Adolf Hitler at the Reich Chancellery. Hitler did not mention to Bartha that he already decided the previous month upon an invasion of the Soviet Union, codenamed Operation Barbarossa. The backwardness of Hungary had persuaded Hitler that the Honved (Royal Hungarian Army) would be a liability instead of an asset on the Eastern Front. Hitler lied to Bartha by claiming that the German troop build-up in Eastern Europe which already started was only for defensive reasons to prevent the Soviet Union from taking advantage of Germany being engaged in war with Great Britain and he denied that Germany was going to invade the Soviet Unio later that year. Hitler told Bartha that all he wanted of Hungary was to have the Honved reinforce the eastern passages into the Carpathian mountains because as Hitler told Bartha "if Russian Bolshevism breaks through this barrier, they would advance perhaps as far as Vienna or even further".

At a meeting of the Council of Ministers in Budapest on 1 April 1941 to discuss the question of invading Yugoslavia, the Foreign Minister László Bárdossy and the Interior Minister Ferenc Keresztes-Fischer spoke in favor of a limited invasion of Yugoslavia independent of the German invasion of Yugoslavia with the aim of occupying certain Magyar majority districts in the Banat. Bartha, supported by the Chief of the General Staff, General Henrik Werth (who was also attending the meeting) spoke for Hungary joining forces with the Reich in a full invasion of Yugoslavia. The prime minister Pál Teleki was opposed to the invasion, warning that to invade Yugoslavia would mean a break with Britain that he predicted would lead to a disaster as he believed that Britain would win the war. Teleki argued that since the American Congress had just ratified the Lend-Lease agreement that Britain had the full support of the United States and that the Anglo-American alliance would ultimately defeat Germany. When the majority of the council decided for an invasion of Yugoslavia, Teleki committed suicide in protest and was succeeded by Bárdossy.

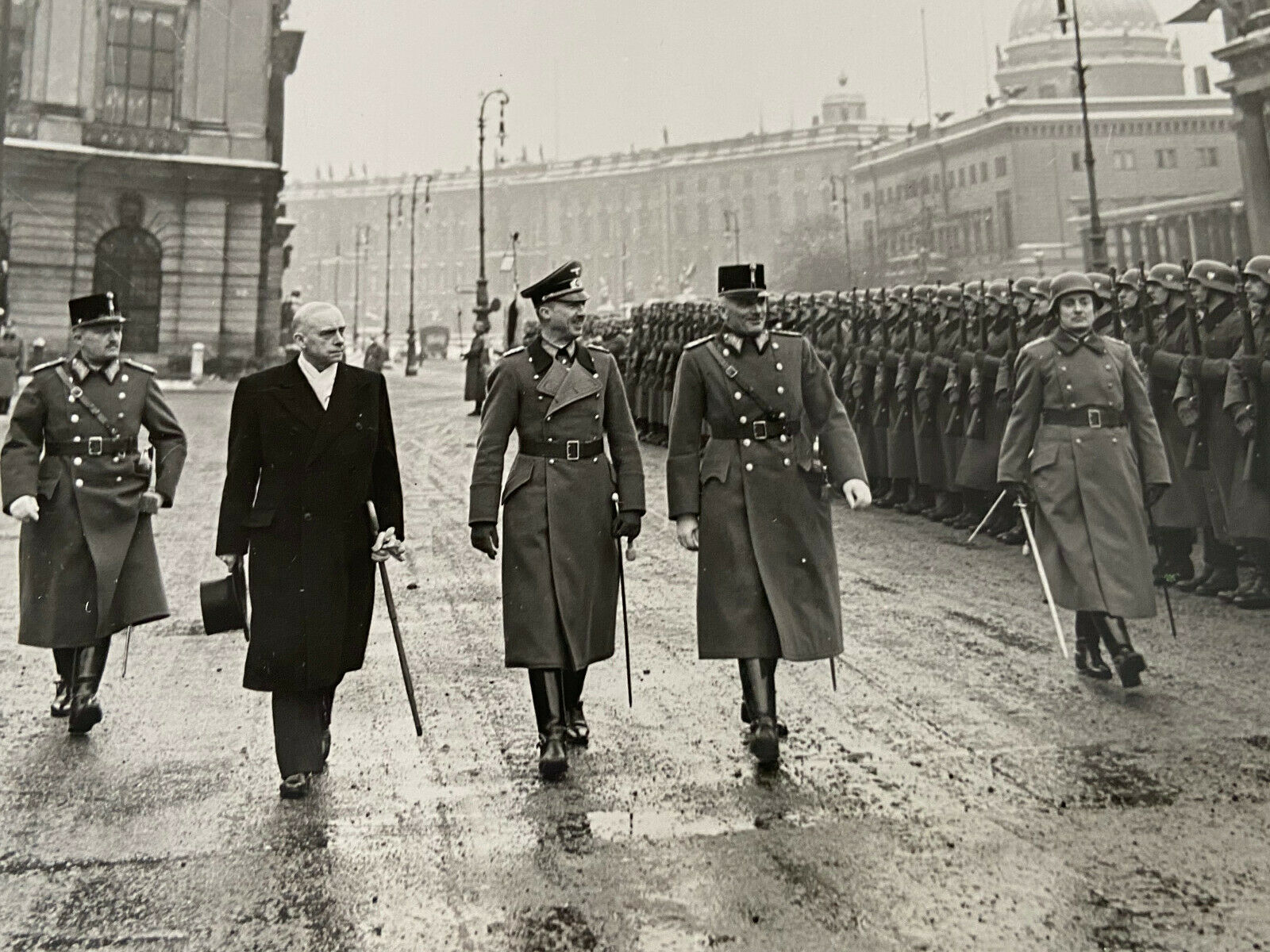
Bartha (second on the right) reviewing Wehrmacht troops in Jena during his visit to Germany in January 1941. The man second from the left is the Hungarian minister to Germany and future prime minister Döme Sztójay.

Bartha was a strong advocate of having Hungary fight on the Eastern Front. On 23 June 1941, Bartha told the council of ministers: "I think that having defeated the Poles in three weeks, having finished off the French in about as much time, and having beaten the Yugoslav Army in twelve days and occupied the entire Balkans in three weeks, in six weeks the Germans will be in Moscow and completely defeat Russia". The bombing of Kassa was used as the pretext for having the Hungary entered the Second World War in 1941. After received the reports of the bombing of Kassa on the morning of 26 June 1941, on the afternoon of the same day Bartha went with Werth went to see the Regent of Hungary, Admiral Miklós Horthy. Both Bartha and Werth were categorical in insisting that the Soviet Union had bombed Kassa and demanded an immediate declaration of war. Horthy believed the claims of Bartha and Werth and ordered Bárdossy to issue the declaration of war. On 27 June 1941, Hungary declared war on the Soviet Union.

Werth saw the war as the ideal occasion to execute a plan for expelling all of the Jews, Romanians and Slovaks living under Hungarian rule into Galicia. Ámon Pásztóy, a civil servant who haded the Public Security Department of the Ministry of the Interior testified at his postwar trial for war crimes: "the decree of expulsion was initiated by Henrik Werth, who was not a member of the Council of Ministers, but at that time was also present. On the basis of his suggestion, this proposal was presented to the Cabinet as a motion by Károly Bartha, then minister of defense". Bárdossy vetoed the Werth-Bartha plan, but did agree to a scaled down version under which any foreign Jew living in Hungary was to be classified as an illegal immigrant and expelled into Galicia. The plan was approved by the Council of Ministers with only the Interior Minister Ferenc Keresztes-Fischer voting against the plan. To counter Keresztes-Fischer's objections, Bartha told the Council of Ministers that "resettlement from a military point of view is well-prepared and the displaced persons, with the support of the Hungarian military administration, will be supplied all the prerequisites which is necessary for the reconstruction of a devastated territory and the launching of their new existence." Bartha added that the expelled Jews would be provided with abandoned farms so that "they can engage in agriculture" and gave his word that the "these Jews will not be exposed to any danger because they will be under the protection of the Hungarian army stationed in Galicia". The American historian George Eisen wrote that Bartha's "egregious claims" were all lies and in fact the Jews deported into Galicia were subjected to systematic mistreatment as a prelude for their extermination. On 10 July 1941, Miklós Kozma, the government commissioner for Ruthenia, told Bárdossy: "Next week I will put across the border non-Hungarian citizens, infiltrated Galicianers, exposed Ukrainian agitators, and Gypsies. The details have already been finalized with Bartha, Szombathelyi, and the commander of the army corps in Debrecen". The Honved under Bartha's leadership was deeply involved in the deportations of Jews into Galicia in the summer of 1941.

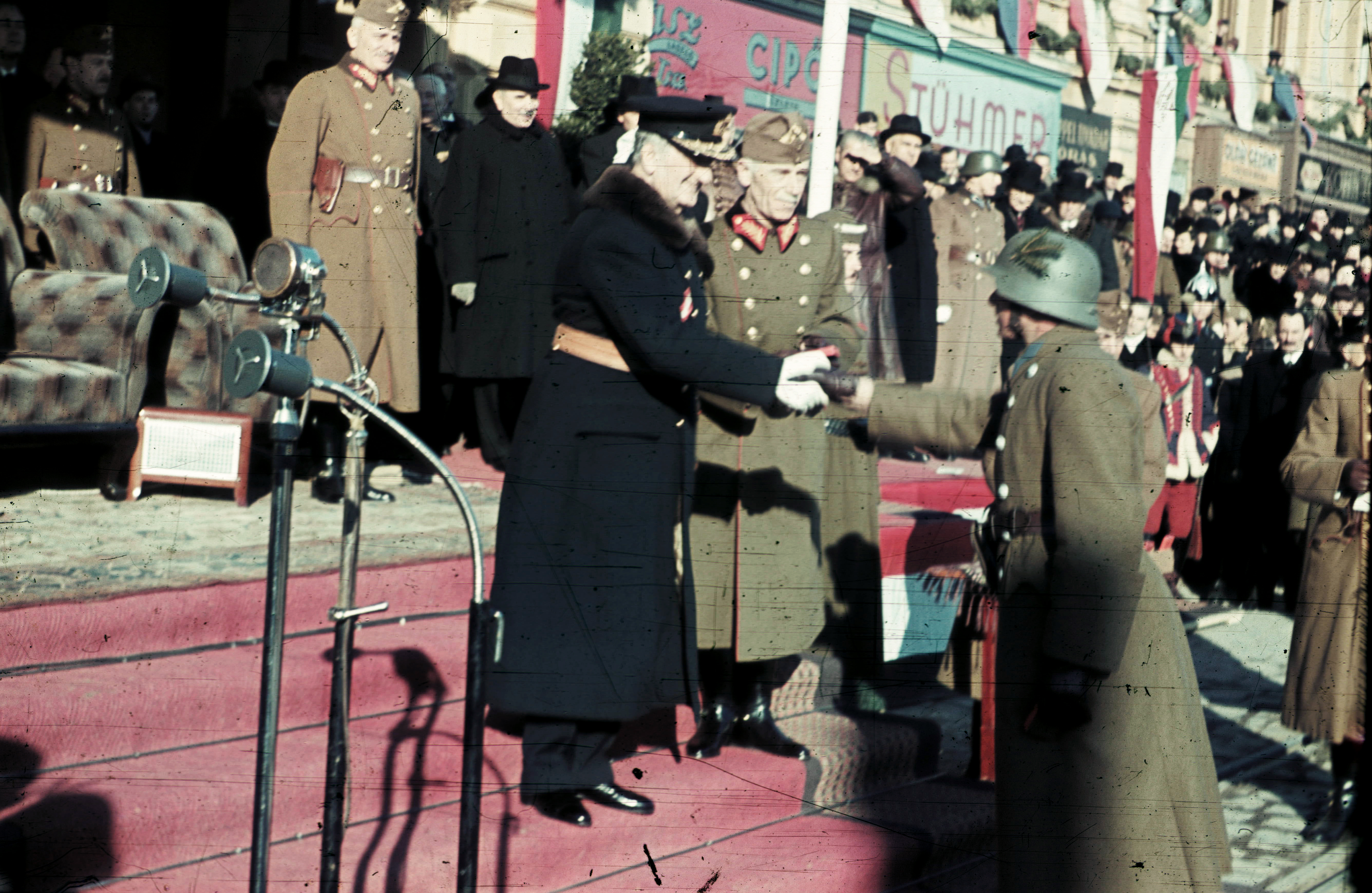
Admiral Horthy greets a Hungarian serviceman who has just returned from the Eastern Front, December 1941. Bartha is the man in the rear on the left.

He played a large role in the unfortunate occasions of Vojvodina massacres. On 8 January 1942, the German Foreign Minister Joachim von Ribbentrop visited Budapest for a summit with the Prime Minister László Bárdossy and the Regent Miklós Horthy. Ribbentrop admitted to Bárdossy that Germany had failed to defeat the Soviet Union in 1941 as he confidently stated it would in June 1941, which he blamed entirely upon the Russian winter, saying if were not so cold in Russia then the Wehrmacht would had taken Moscow. Ribbentrop went on to say that the Reich would defeat the Soviet Union in 1942, but stated to do that Germany needed the help of Hungary. The Foreign Minister stated that the Reich was planning an offensive into the Caucasus, which was where the Soviet Union's main sources of oil was located, which if successful would give Germany another source of oil besides for Romania and deprive the Soviet Union of its oil. Ribbentrop confessed that the Wehrmacht had taken heavy losses on the Eastern Front and could not maintain the entire Eastern Front on its own, which would require Hungary to send a massive number of soldiers to the Eastern Front to make up for the Wehrmacht's losses in 1941. Bárdossy agreed to reinforce the Hungarian Expeditionary Force on the Eastern Front, but left the details to be worked out between Bartha and Field Marshal Wilhelm Keitel, the chief of the OKW (Oberkommando der Wehrmacht-High Command of the Wehrmacht). As chief of the OWK, Keitel was the German equivalent of Bartha's status as Defense Minister. Keitel arrived in Budapest on 20 January 1942 to tell Bartha that he wanted the entire Honved sent to fight on the Eastern Front. Hungary and Romania were perpetually on the brink of war because of the Transylvania dispute and border incidents were common, leading to Bartha to argue that Hungary could not send its all of its soldiers to the Eastern Front. However, Romania under the leadership of Ion Antonescu had already promised to sent 16 divisions to fight on the Eastern Front and Admiral Horthy was greatly worried that Hungary did not make an effort equal to Romania, Hitler might revise the Second Vienna Award and give northern Transylvania back to Romania as Antonescu wanted. On 22 January 1942, General Ferenc Szombathelyi, the chief of the Hungarian General Staff, promised Keitel to send the Second Hungarian Army, which consisted of 207, 000 men, to the Eastern Front, which was less than Keitel had asked for, but still made up one-third of the Honved. The First Hungarian Army remained in Hungary to guard the border with Romania.

The soldiers that been sent to the Eastern Front in 1941 that made up three corps had been mobilised from a few regions, but for the Second Army, Bartha changed the system for mobilising soldiers. For the Second Army, Bartha decided to mobilise 20% of all the men from all the regions of Hungary to make up the required number of 207,000 men while leaving behind 80% of the men to continue with civilian life. Bartha argued that by moblising only 20% of the men from all the districts, he would ensure that there was still young men left to mobilise in the event of a war with Romania, which he expected to break out once the war with the Soviet Union was over as Antonescu had made it very clear he did not accept the Second Vienna Award and would go to war to take back northern Transylvania. The mobilisation of men for the Second Army started in February 1942 and turned out to be a political disaster for the government. The fact that only 20% of the men were being called up for national service while the other 80% were being allowed to continue with their civilian lives provoked much resentment with those called up for national service often being angry that their friends, neighbors, relatives, co-workers and so forth were not being called up. Furthermore, the draft boards in charge of the mobilisation proved much likely to call up for national service lower income men than higher income men and to call up men who were considered to be troublemakers or politically unreliable. The open ballot in the rural areas of Hungary ensured that the government knew precisely who had voted for what party, and those who had voted against the ruling Party of Hungarian Life (formerly known as the Unity Party) were much more likely to be drafted than those who had voted for the party. The mobilisation that Bartha oversaw in the first months of 1942 proved to be a turning point in Hungarian attitudes towards the war with there being a widespread feeling that the mobilisation was done in an unfair manner and those called up for national service were being punished either for holding the wrong political views or simply for being poor. In April 1942, the training of the Second Army was completed and it departed for the Soviet Union.

In March 1942, Bartha changed that rule for conscription into the dreaded labour service battalions by announcing that 10%–15% of all the men serving on the frontline lines in the Hungarian Expeditionary Force on the Eastern Front would be men from the labour service battalions. However, Bartha upheld the previous rule that men serving in the labour service battalions were not to be issued arms under any conditions, which in effect left the labour service battalions highly vulnerable and led to an extremely heavy death rate as the labour service men serving on the front lines had no means of defending themselves. The same order also stated that identifying Jewish men to serve in the labour service battalions would be based upon their surnames along with their occupations. On 22 April 1942, Bartha changed the rule for conscription into the labour service battalions by removing the age limit of 42, which allowed the Hungarian authorities to draft any Jewish men into the labour service regardless of their age. The Hungarian historian Nicholas Nagy-Talavera wrote that Bartha was engaged in a genocide via conscription as he made a point of calling up Jewish middle-class men and having them assigned to the labour service battalions serving on the Eastern Front. Nagy-Talavera argued that there is no rational explanation as why Bartha had Jewish doctors, engineers, scientists, university professors, and other middle-class professionals assigned to menial labour on the frontlines on the most deadly front in World War Two without weapons except that it was the intention to have them all killed. Nagy-Talavera also noted that Bartha had Jewish World War One veterans including former officers who had won decorations fighting for Hungary all assigned to the labour service when it would had been far more rational to have the former officers to once again serve as officers. Bartha was an anti-Semitic officer who resented that the success of the Hungarian Jewish middle class and he took a sadistic pleasure out of seeing formerly successful Jewish middle class men serve and suffer in the labor service. Bartha did nothing to address the frequent complaints he received about the mistreatment of the labour service men as the Defense Ministry received a deluge of complaints about beatings and executions of the labour service men by their own officers along with complaints that the men in the labour service were being deprived of food and allowed to starve to death.

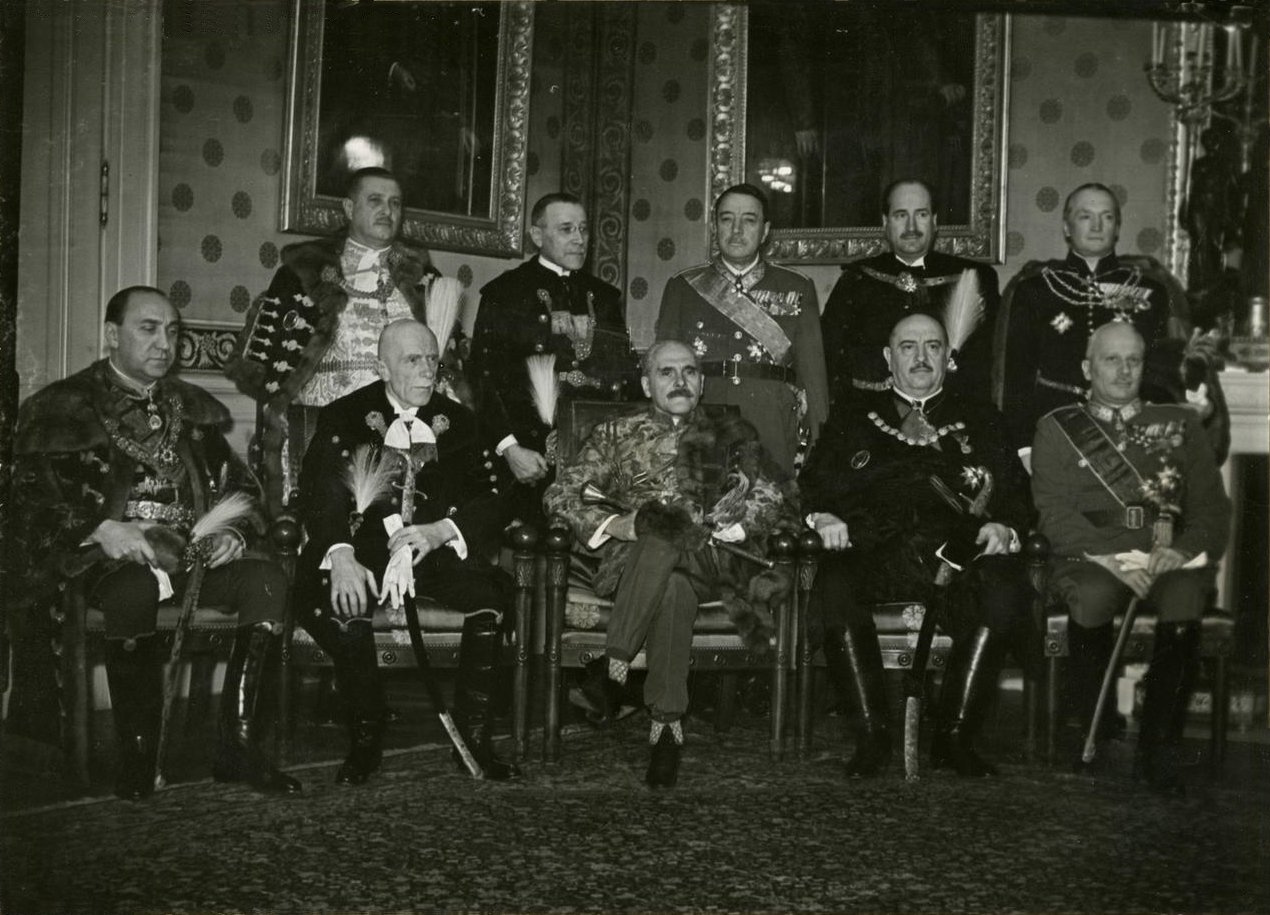
The prime minister Miklós Kállay and his cabinet dressed in the traditional clothing of Magyar noblemen, March 1942. Sitting to the left of Kállay is the Interior Minister Ferenc Keresztes-Fischer and sitting to his right is the Education Minister Bálint Hóman. Bartha is sitting to the right of Hóman.

In June 1942, Bartha changed the requirement for conscription into the labour service battalions of the Honved by announcing in a speech before the parliament that henceforward being considered Jewish was to be considered in racial terms. Using the Nuremberg Laws of 1935 as the inspiration, Bartha stated that henceforward Jewish converts to Christianity as well as the sons and grandsons of Jewish converts of Christianity would be conscripted into the labour service battalions. On 31 July 1942, Bartha stripped all Jewish servicemen of their ranks in the Honved, giving them the status of auxiliaries without rank who were below in status to even the privates serving in the Honved. The same order also applied to Hungarian Jewish servicemen who had fought in World War One in the Honved who were stripped of all their ranks and any decorations that they might had won while fighting for Hungary. In the summer of 1942, the prime minister Miklós Kállay commissioned a report into allegations of mistreatment of the men serving in the labour service battalions. The report presented to Parliament in September 1942 categorically stated the allegations of mistreatment and starvation of the men in the labour service battalions were true and that "brutality, violence and corruption were permanent manifestations in all the front lines". Horthy fired him from the government because of their pro-German stance. Bartha was replaced by Vilmos Nagy de Nagybaczon on 24 September 1942. Kállay ordered the new defense minister, Nagy de Nagybaczon, to improve conditions in the labour service, which he stated had become a national scandal.

== Later life ==
Károly Bartha did undertake either a political or military role after his retirement. After the war, he was considered responsible for entering the war by the People's Tribunal. The Military Court downgraded him and later fired from the Magyar Honvédség. After the communist takeover, he was harassed by the police services, so he chose to emigrate to Venezuela, where he worked as a railway constructing engineer. He died in 1964 during a visit to Linz, Austria.

== Books and articles ==
- Bán, András (2004). Hungarian-British Diplomacy 1938-1941 The Attempt to Maintain Relations. London: Taylor & Francis. ISBN 9781135753924.
- Cornelius, Deborah S. (2011). Hungary in World War II Caught in the Cauldron. New York: Fordham University Press. ISBN 9780823237739.
- Eisen, George (2023). A Summer of Mass Murder: 1941 Rehearsal for the Hungarian Holocaust. West Lafayette: Purdue University Press.
- Harrison, Christopher (2023). Genocidal Conscription Drafting Victims and Perpetrators Under the Guise of War. London: Bloomsbury Publishing. ISBN 9781978791930.
- Kramer, T.D (2000). From Emancipation to Catastrophe The Rise and Holocaust of Hungarian Jewry. London: : Bloomsbury Academic. ISBN 9780761817598.
- Romsics, Ignac (2017). "Hungary". In David Stahel (ed.). Joining Hitler's Crusade European Nations and the Invasion of the Soviet Union, 1941. Cambridge: Cambridge University Press. pp. 79–106. ISBN 9781316510346.
- Nagy-Talavera, Nicholas M. (1970). The Green Shirts and the Others A History of Fascism in Hungary and Rumania. Stanford: Hoover Institution Press. ISBN 9780817918514.

Political offices
Preceded by Jenő Rátz	Minister of Defence; 1938-1942	Succeeded by Vilmos Nagy
