= Zoltán Szenes =

Hungarian military officer

- Born: 23 July 1951 (age 75); Köcsk, Hungary
- Military career
- Allegiance: Hungary
- Service years: 1969–2005
- Rank: Lieutenant General
- Commands: General Staff of the Armed Forces of the Republic of Hungary

Lt. Gen. Zoltán Szenes (born 23 July 1951) is a retired Hungarian military officer, who served as the Chief of the General Staff of the Armed Forces of the Republic of Hungary from 1 March 2003 to 31 January 2005.

== Awards and decorations ==

1st row	Hungarian Order of Merit Commanders's Cross on military ribbon	Service Medals for Officers (Hungary) 1st class	Medal for Service to the Country (HPR) Silver Medal	Meritorious Service Medal HPR (1964) for 20 years service
2nd row	Meritorious Service Medal HPR (1964) for 15 years service	Meritorious Service Medal HPR (1964) for 10 years service	Order of Merit of the People's Republic of Hungary	Commander of the Legion of Merit

== Sources ==
- CV at Magyar Hadtudományi Társaság

Military offices
Preceded by Col. Gen. Lajos Fodor	Chief of the General Staff; 1 March 2003 – 31 January 2005	Succeeded by Col. Gen. András Havril
