= Vilmos Rőder =

Hungarian military officer and politician

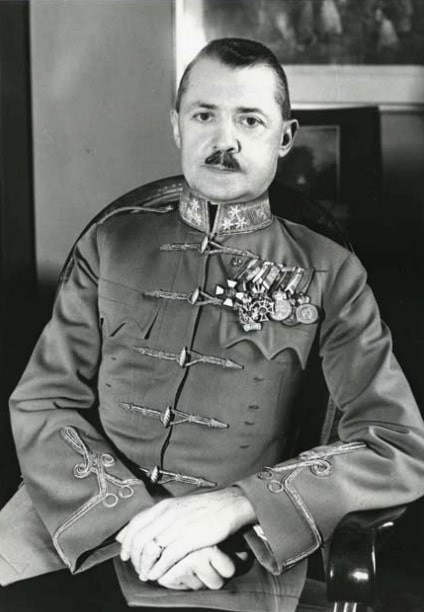
- Rőder in 1938
- Born: 11 January 1881; Pécs, Kingdom of Hungary
- Died: 13 December 1969 (aged 88); Budapest, People's Republic of Hungary
- Military career
- Allegiance: Austria-Hungary; Kingdom of Hungary
- Service years: 1899–1934
- Rank: Colonel General
- Conflicts: World War I

Vilmos Rőder (11 January 1881 – 13 December 1969) was a Hungarian military officer and politician, who served as Minister of Defence between 1936 and 1938. He fought in the First World War as Chief of Army Staff of Army Corps. He was the triggering of the army development between 1930 and 1934, but he had a conflict with Prime Minister Gyula Gömbös in connection with these plans, that's why he retired. Later the new prime minister Kálmán Darányi appointed him as Minister of Defence. He participated in the planning of the Program of Győr. Rőder resigned along with the other members of the cabinet in 1938. Following this he joined to the group of István Bethlen, which opposed entering World War II.

Political offices
Preceded by József Somkuthy	Minister of Defence; 1936–1938	Succeeded by Jenő Rátz
