= Dardel =

Dardel may refer to:

- Carlo von Dardel (1880–1955), Swedish diplomat
- Fritz von Dardel (1817–1901), Swedish illustrator and early comics artist
- Guy von Dardel (1919–2009), Swedish physicist
- Jean-Jacques von Dardel (1918–1989), Swedish diplomat
- Jean Dardel (14th century), French Franciscan, chronicler of Armenia, adviser and confessor to the king of Armenia
- Nils Dardel (1888–1943), Swedish Post-Impressionist painter
- Nina Viveka Maria von Dardel (1921–2019), Swedish businesswoman, half-sister of Raoul Wallenberg
- Därdel, a card game also known as Tatteln or Tartli

== See also ==
- Maya Dardel, a 2017 US-Polish drama film
