= Gyöngyösi =

Gyöngyösi is a surname. Notable people with the surname include:

- András Gyöngyösi (born 1968), Hungarian water polo player
- István Gyöngyösi (1620–1704), Hungarian poet
- János Gyöngyösi (1893–1951), Hungarian politician
- László Gyöngyösi (1927–2016), Hungarian swimmer
- Levente Gyöngyösi (born 1975), Romanian-born Hungarian composer
- Márton Gyöngyösi (born 1977), Hungarian economist and politician
