= Boldóczki =

Boldóczki is a Hungarian surname. Notable people with the surname include:

- Gábor Boldoczki (born 1976), Hungarian classical trumpeter
- János Boldóczki (1912–1988), Hungarian politician
