= Raoul Wallenberg =

Swedish diplomat and humanitarian (1912–1945)

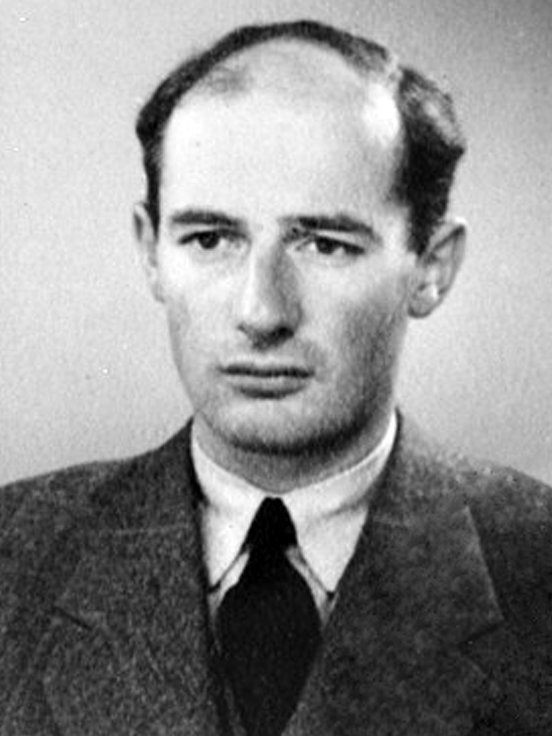
- Passport photo from June 1944
- Born: Raoul Gustaf Wallenberg; 4 August 1912; Lidingö, Sweden
- Disappeared: 17 January 1945; Budapest, Hungary
- Status: Missing for 81 years, 9 months and 30 days Declared dead in absentia by the Swedish Tax Agency; 31 July 1952 (aged 39)
- Died: Disputed, possibly 17 July 1947 (aged 34) (Note: He is presumed to have died in 1947, although the circumstances of his death are not clear and this date has been disputed. Some reports claim he was alive years later. In accordance with Swedish law, the Swedish Tax Agency in October 2016 determined his pro-forma date of death as 31 July 1952.)
- Monuments: List
- Education: University of Michigan
- Occupations: Businessman and diplomat
- Known for: Rescuing Hungarian Jews from the Holocaust; Abduction and disappearance by Soviet agents
- Relatives: Guy von Dardel (maternal half-brother); Nina Lagergren (maternal half-sister); Nils Dardel (step-uncle)
- Family: Wallenberg family (biological father)
- Awards: List

Raoul Wallenberg (4 August 1912 – disappeared 17 January 1945) was a Swedish architect, businessman, diplomat, and humanitarian. He saved thousands of Jews in German-occupied Hungary during the Holocaust from German Nazis and Hungarian fascists during the later stages of World War II. While serving as Sweden's special envoy in Budapest between July and December 1944, Wallenberg issued protective passports and sheltered Jews in buildings which he declared as Swedish territory.

On 17 January 1945, during the Siege of Budapest by the Red Army, agents of SMERSH detained Wallenberg on suspicion of espionage, and he subsequently disappeared. In 1957, 12 years after his disappearance, he was reported by Soviet authorities to have died of a suspected myocardial infarction on 17 July 1947 while imprisoned in the Lubyanka, the prison at the headquarters of the NKVD secret police in Moscow. A document released in 2023 as part of the President John F. Kennedy Assassination Records Collection indicates that Vyacheslav Nikonov, then an assistant to the head of the KGB, determined as part of a 1991 inquiry into the circumstances surrounding his disappearance that Wallenberg had likely been executed by Soviet authorities in late 1947 as a result of claims that he may have been associated with people helping not only Jews but also Nazi war criminals escape prosecution. However, there is no conclusive proof of this theory of Wallenberg's death, and his cause and date of death have been disputed ever since, with some people claiming to have encountered men matching Wallenberg's description until the 1980s in Soviet prisons and psychiatric hospitals. The motives behind Wallenberg's arrest and imprisonment by the Soviet government, along with questions surrounding the circumstances of his death and his ties to US intelligence, remain shrouded in mystery and are the subject of continued speculation. In 2016, the Swedish Tax Agency declared him dead in absentia, with the pro forma date of death noted as 31 July 1952.

As a result of his successful efforts to rescue Hungarian Jews, Wallenberg has been the subject of numerous humanitarian honours in the decades following his presumed death. In 1981, US Congressman Tom Lantos, one of those saved by Wallenberg, sponsored a bill making Wallenberg an honorary citizen of the United States, the second person ever to receive this honour, after Sir Winston Churchill. Wallenberg also became an honorary citizen of Canada, Hungary, Australia, the United Kingdom and Israel. In 1963, Yad Vashem designated Raoul Wallenberg as one of the Righteous Among the Nations. Numerous monuments have been dedicated to him, and streets have been named after him throughout the world. The Raoul Wallenberg Committee of the United States was founded in 1981 to "perpetuate the humanitarian ideals and the nonviolent courage of Raoul Wallenberg." It gives the Raoul Wallenberg Award annually to recognize persons who take action to further these ideals. In 2012, Wallenberg was awarded a Congressional Gold Medal by the United States Congress "in recognition of his achievements and heroic actions during the Holocaust." Declassified documents have confirmed that Raoul Wallenberg worked with the Office of Strategic Services (OSS), the predecessor of the CIA.

Although some have claimed that Wallenberg was responsible for rescuing 100,000 Jews who survived the Holocaust in Hungary, historians regard that figure as an exaggeration; Yad Vashem estimates the number of people granted protective paperwork as about 4,500 individuals.

== Early life ==
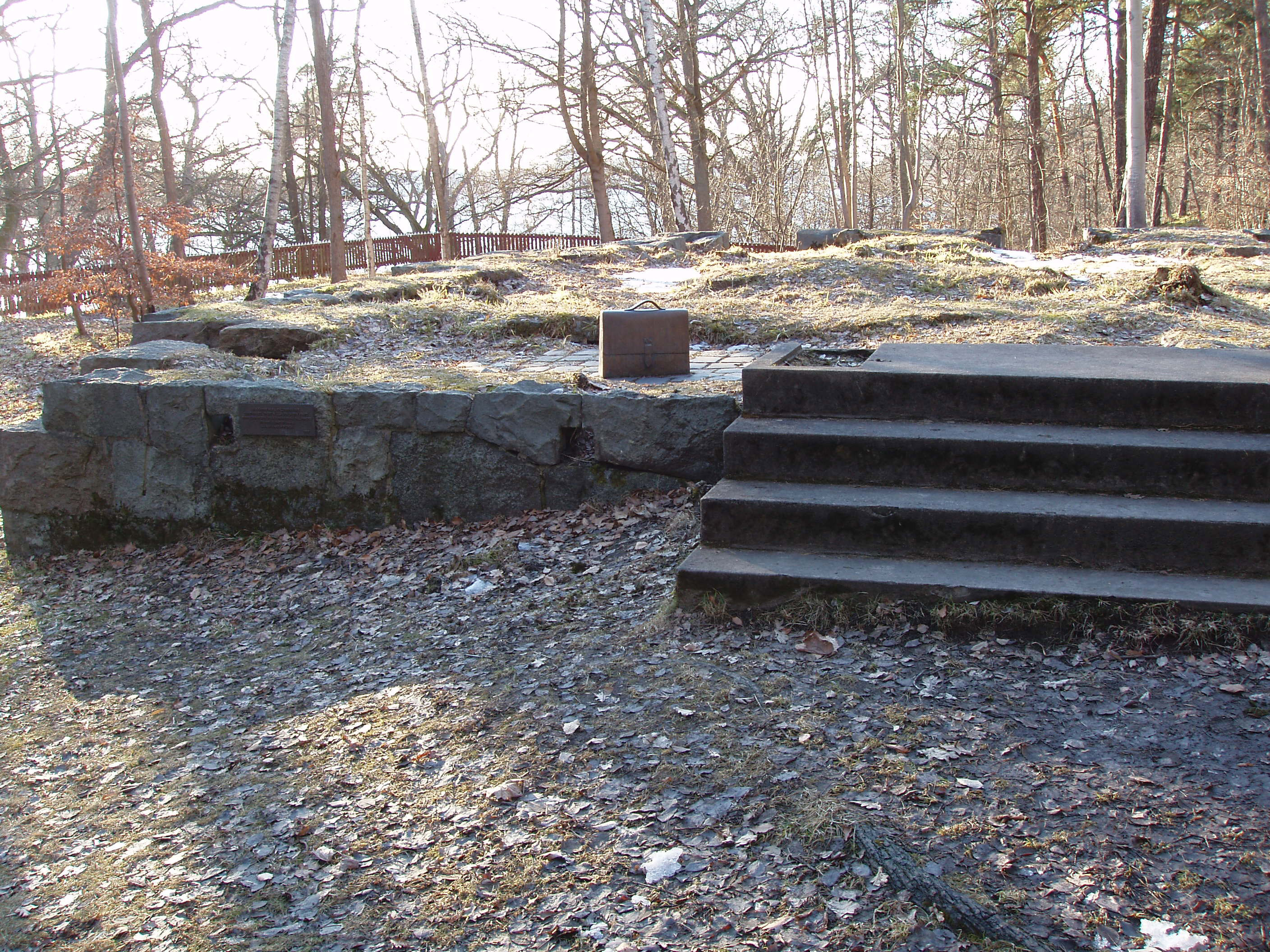
Former location of the summer villa where Wallenberg was born in 1912 (pictured in 2009)

Wallenberg was born in 1912 in Lidingö Municipality, near Stockholm, where his maternal grandparents, Per Johan Wising and his wife Sophie Wising (née Benedicks), had built a summer house in 1882. His paternal grandfather, Gustaf Wallenberg, was a diplomat and envoy to Tokyo, Istanbul, and Sofia.

His parents, who married in 1911, were Raoul Oscar Wallenberg (1888–1912), a Swedish naval officer, and Maria "Maj" Sofia Wising (1891–1979). His father died of cancer three months before he was born, and his maternal grandfather died of pneumonia three months after his birth. His mother and grandmother, now both suddenly widows, raised him together. In 1918, his mother married Fredric von Dardel; they had a son, Guy von Dardel, and a daughter, Nina Lagergren.

After high school and his compulsory eight months in the Swedish military, Wallenberg's paternal grandfather sent him to study in Paris. He spent one year there, and then in 1931 he studied architecture at the University of Michigan in the United States. Although the Wallenberg family was rich, he worked at odd jobs in his free time and joined other young male students as a passenger rickshaw handler at Chicago's Century of Progress. He used his vacations to explore the United States, with hitchhiking being his preferred method of travel. About his experiences, he wrote to his grandfather saying, "When you travel like a hobo, everything's different. You have to be on the alert the whole time. You're in close contact with new people every day. Hitchhiking gives you training in diplomacy and tact."

Wallenberg was aware of his one-sixteenth Jewish ancestry and proud of it. It came from his great-great-grandfather (his maternal grandmother's grandfather) Michael Benedicks, who immigrated to Stockholm in 1780 and converted to Christianity. Ingemar Hedenius (one of the leading Swedish philosophers) recalls a conversation with Wallenberg dating back to 1930 when they were together in an army hospital during military service:

We had many long and intimate conversations. He was full of ideas and plans for the future. Although I was a good deal older – you could choose when to do your service – I was enormously impressed by him. He was proud of his partial Jewish ancestry and, as I recall, must have exaggerated it somewhat. I remember him saying, 'A person like me, who is both a Wallenberg and half-Jewish, can never be defeated'.

Raoul Wallenberg's Jewish ancestry is supported by Sweden researcher Paul A. Levine, who wrote in his monograph about Wallenberg:

There is general agreement that around the end of the eighteen[th] century, a German Jew named Benedicts emigrated to Sweden, establishing the material line of [Raoul's] Wallenberg’s family.

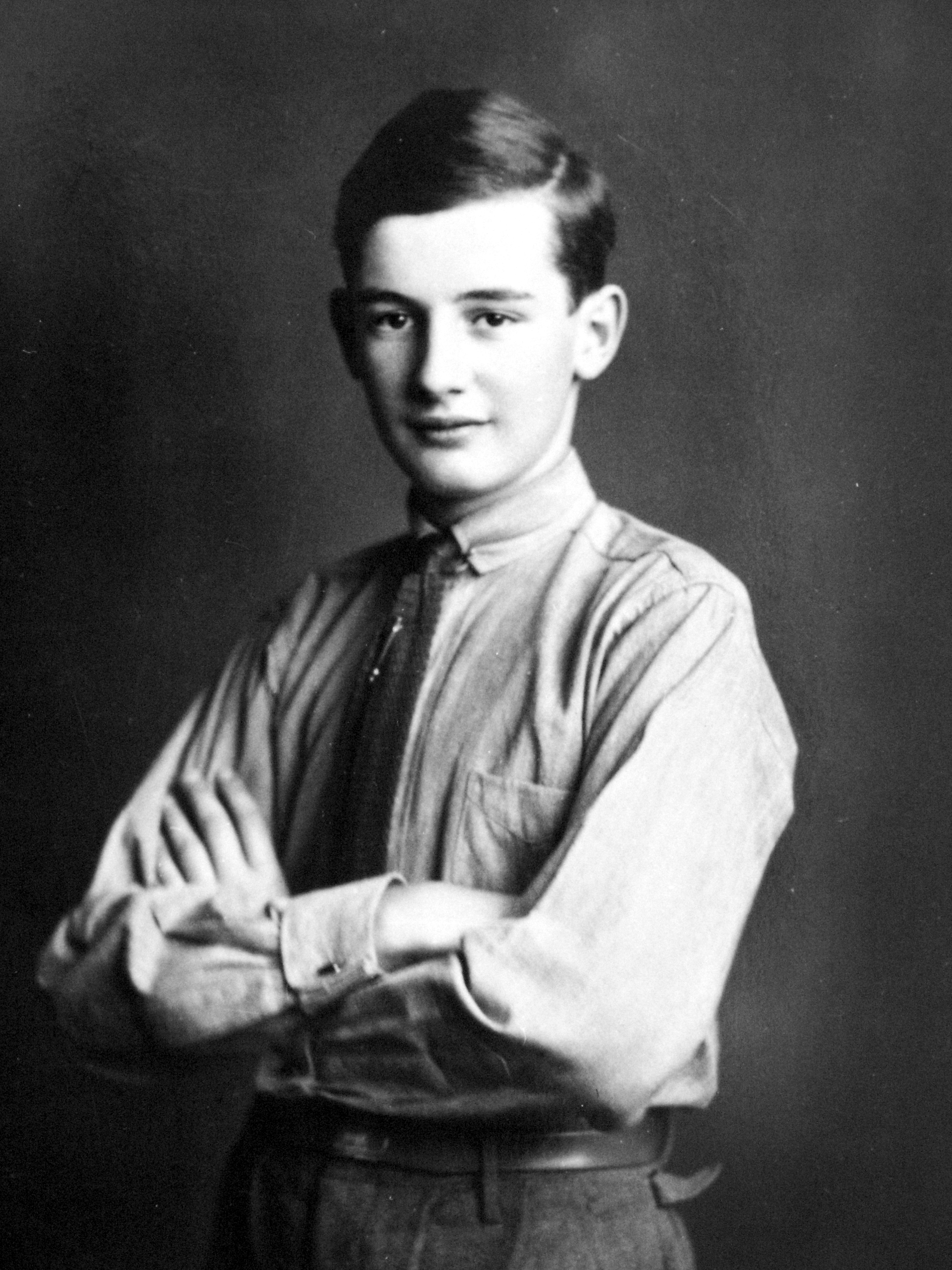
Wallenberg as a youth

Wallenberg graduated from the University of Michigan in 1935 with a degree in architecture. Upon his return to Sweden, he found that his American degree did not qualify him to practice as an architect. Later that year, his grandfather arranged a job for him in Cape Town, South Africa, in the office of a Swedish company that sold construction material. After six months in South Africa, he took a new job at a branch office of the Holland Bank in Haifa, where he met and befriended Jewish refugees from Nazi Germany. He returned to Sweden in 1936, securing a job in Stockholm with the help of his father's cousin and godfather, Jacob Wallenberg, at the Central European Trading Company, an export-import company trading between Stockholm and central Europe, owned by Kálmán Lauer, a Hungarian Jew.

== World War II ==
Beginning in 1938, the Kingdom of Hungary, under the regency of Miklós Horthy, passed a series of anti-Jewish measures modeled on the so-called Nuremberg Race Laws enacted in Germany by the Nazis in 1935. Like their German counterparts, the Hungarian laws focused heavily on restricting Jews from certain professions, reducing the number of Jews in government and public service jobs, and prohibiting intermarriage. Because of this, Wallenberg's business associate, Kálmán Lauer, found it increasingly difficult to travel to his native Hungary, which was moving still deeper into the German orbit. Hungary became a member of the Axis powers in November 1940 and later joined the Nazi-led invasion of the Soviet Union in June 1941. Out of necessity, Wallenberg became Lauer's personal representative. He traveled to Hungary to conduct business on Lauer's behalf and to look in on members of Lauer's extended family who remained in Budapest. He soon learned to speak Hungarian and, from 1941, made increasingly frequent travels to Budapest. Within a year, Wallenberg was a joint owner and the International Director of the company. In this capacity, Wallenberg also made several business trips to Germany and German-occupied France during the early years of World War II. It was during these trips that Wallenberg was able to closely observe the Nazis' bureaucratic and administrative methods—knowledge which proved valuable to him later.

Meanwhile, the situation in Hungary had begun to deteriorate as the tide of the war began to turn decisively against Germany and its allies. Following the catastrophic Axis defeat at the Battle of Stalingrad (in which Hungarian troops fighting alongside German forces suffered a staggering 84% casualty rate), the Horthy regime began secretly pursuing peace talks with the United States and the United Kingdom. Upon learning of Horthy's duplicity, Adolf Hitler ordered the occupation of Hungary by German troops in March 1944. The Wehrmacht quickly took control of the country and placed Horthy under house arrest. A pro-German puppet government was installed in Budapest; actual power rested with the German military governor, SS-Brigadeführer Edmund Veesenmayer. With the Nazis now in control, the relative security from the Holocaust enjoyed by the Jews of Hungary came to an end. In April and May 1944, the Nazi regime and its accomplices began the mass deportation of Hungary's Jews to extermination camps in German-occupied Poland. Under the personal leadership of SS-Obersturmbannführer Adolf Eichmann, who was later tried and hanged in Israel for his role in the implementation of the Nazis' Final Solution, deportations took place at a rate of 12,000 people per day.

=== "Pimpernel" Smith screening ===
Wallenberg was directly inspired by "Pimpernel" Smith, a 1941 British anti-Nazi propaganda thriller. The film had been banned in Sweden, but Wallenberg and his sister, Nina, were invited to a private screening at the British Embassy in Stockholm. Enthralled by Professor Smith (played by Leslie Howard), who saved twenty-eight Jews from the Nazis, Nina stated, "We thought the film was amazing. When we got up from our seats, Raoul said, ‘that is the kind of thing I would like to do’".

=== Recruitment by the War Refugee Board ===
On 21 June 1944, George Mantello received and immediately publicized two important reports given to him by Romanian diplomat Florian Manilou, who had returned from a fact-finding trip to Romania and Budapest at Mantello's request. Manilou received material from Miklos "Moshe" Krausz in Budapest, who worked with Carl Lutz to rescue Jews. One of the reports was probably Rabbi Chaim Michael Dov Weissmandl's abridged version of the 33-page Auschwitz Protocols (i.e., the Vrba-Wetzler and Rosin-Mordowicz reports). The reports described in detail the operations of the Auschwitz-Birkenau extermination camp. The second was a six-page Hungarian report that detailed the ghettoization and deportation of 435,000 Hungarian Jews, as updated to 19 June 1944, by towns, to Auschwitz.

Mantello publicized the reports' findings immediately upon receipt. This resulted in large-scale grassroots protest in Switzerland against the unprecedented barbarism against Jews and led to Horthy being threatened by US President Franklin D. Roosevelt and UK Prime Minister Winston Churchill. In a letter, Churchill wrote, "There is no doubt that this persecution of Jews in Hungary and their expulsion from enemy territory is probably the greatest and most horrible crime ever committed in the whole history of the world...."

Following the report's publication, the Roosevelt administration turned to the newly created War Refugee Board (WRB) in search of a solution to the genocide against Jews. US Treasury Department official Iver C. Olsen was dispatched to Stockholm as a representative of the WRB and tasked with putting together a plan to rescue the Jews of Hungary. In addition to his duties with the WRB, Olsen was also secretly employed as the chief of "Currency Operations" for the Stockholm station of the Office of Strategic Services (OSS), the United States' wartime espionage service.

In search of someone willing and able to go to Budapest to organize a rescue program for the nation's Jews, Olsen established contact with a relief committee composed of many prominent Swedish Jews led by the Swedish Chief Rabbi Marcus Ehrenpreis to locate an appropriate person to travel to Budapest under diplomatic cover and lead the rescue operation. One member of the committee was Wallenberg's business associate Kálmán Lauer.

The committee's first choice to lead the mission was Count Folke Bernadotte, the vice-chairman of the Swedish Red Cross and a member of the Swedish Royal Family. When Bernadotte's proposed appointment was rejected by the Hungarians, Lauer suggested Wallenberg as a potential replacement. Olsen was introduced to Wallenberg by Lauer in June 1944 and came away from the meeting impressed and, shortly thereafter, appointed Wallenberg to lead the mission. Olsen's selection of Wallenberg met with objections from some US officials who doubted his reliability, in light of existing commercial relationships between businesses owned by the Wallenberg family and the German government. These differences were eventually overcome and the Swedish Ministry for Foreign Affairs agreed to the American request to assign Wallenberg to its legation in Budapest as part of an arrangement in which Wallenberg's appointment was granted in exchange for a lessening of American diplomatic pressure on neutral Sweden to curtail the nation's free-trade policies toward Germany.

== Mission to Budapest ==
When Wallenberg reached the Swedish legation in Budapest on 9 July 1944, the intense Nazi campaign to deport the Jews of Hungary to Auschwitz had already been underway for several months. The transports from Hungary were halted with few exceptions by Miklós Horthy two days earlier in large part because he was warned by Roosevelt, Churchill, the King of Sweden and even the Pope after the very vocal Swiss grass roots protests against the mass murder in Auschwitz. Between May and early July 1944, Eichmann and his associates deported more than 400,000 Jews by freight train. All but 15,000 were sent directly to the Auschwitz-Birkenau concentration camp in southern Poland. By the time of Wallenberg's arrival, there were only around 230,000 Jews remaining in Hungary. With fellow Swedish diplomat Per Anger, and Miklos "Moshe" Krausz, they issued "protective passports" (German: Schutzpass), which identified the bearers as Swedish subjects awaiting repatriation and thus prevented their deportation. Acting Interior Minister Béla Horváth, who served for in that capacity for six weeks from 9 September 1944, provided Wallenberg the use of the Ministry's printing press to create these documents. Although not legal, the documents looked official and were generally accepted by German and Hungarian authorities, who sometimes were also bribed. The Swedish legation in Budapest also succeeded in negotiating with the German authorities so that the bearers of the protective passes would be treated as Swedish citizens and be exempt from having to wear the yellow badge required for Jews. When the German government said the travel passes were invalid, Wallenberg appealed for help from Baroness Elisabeth Kemény, wife of Baron Gábor Kemény, Hungarian Minister for Foreign Affairs in Budapest. She convinced her husband to have 9,000 passes honoured.

With the money mostly raised for the War Refugee Board by American Jews, Wallenberg rented 32 buildings in Budapest and declared them to be extraterritorial, protected by diplomatic immunity. He put up signs such as "The Swedish Library" and "The Swedish Research Institute" on their doors and hung oversized Swedish flags on the front of the buildings to bolster the deception. The buildings eventually housed almost 10,000 people.

Sandor Ardai, one of the drivers working for Wallenberg, recounted what Wallenberg did when he intercepted a trainload of Jews about to leave for Auschwitz:

... he climbed up on the roof of the train and began handing in protective passes through the doors which were not yet sealed. He ignored orders from the Germans for him to get down, then the Arrow Cross men began shooting and shouting at him to go away. He ignored them and calmly continued handing out passports to the hands that were reaching out for them. I believe the Arrow Cross men deliberately aimed over his head, as not one shot hit him, which would have been impossible otherwise. I think this is what they did because they were so impressed by his courage. After Wallenberg had handed over the last of the passports he ordered all those who had one to leave the train and walk to the caravan of cars parked nearby, all marked in Swedish colours. I don't remember exactly how many, but he saved dozens off that train, and the Germans and Arrow Cross were so dumbfounded they let him get away with it.

At the height of the program, more than 350 people were involved in the rescue of Jews in Budapest. Sister Sára Salkaházi was caught sheltering Jewish women and was killed by members of the Arrow Cross Party.

Tibor Baranski was a 22-year-old religious student who was recruited by Papal Nuncio Monsignor Angelo Rotta to help save Jews. Baranski, who posed as a Vatican representative, saved about 3,000 Jews. He collaborated with diplomats, including Wallenberg. He met with and talked with Wallenberg on the phone several times. Baranski described Wallenberg's motivation as "divinely human love." "We knew in a second we shared the same opinion … the same recklessness, the same determination, all through," said Baránszki.

Swiss diplomat Carl Lutz also issued protective passports from the Swiss embassy in the spring of 1944; and Italian businessman Giorgio Perlasca posed as a Spanish diplomat and issued forged visas. Portuguese diplomats Sampaio Garrido and Carlos de Liz-Texeira Branquinho rented houses and apartments to shelter and protect refugees from deportation and murder and issued safe conducts to approximately 1,000 Hungarian Jews. Berber Smit (Barbara Hogg), the daughter of Lolle Smit (1892–1961), director of N.V. Philips Budapest and a Dutch spy working for the British MI6, later claimed to have been his girlfriend, also assisted Wallenberg, as did her son. However, she was temporarily engaged to Wallenberg's colleague Lars Berg, and later married a Scottish officer; which has not dispelled claims that Wallenberg was homosexual.

Wallenberg started sleeping in a different house each night, to guard against being captured or killed by Arrow Cross Party members or by Adolf Eichmann's men. Two days before the Soviet Army occupied Budapest, Wallenberg negotiated with Eichmann and with Major-General Gerhard Schmidthuber, the supreme commander of German forces in Hungary. Wallenberg bribed Arrow Cross Party member Pál Szalai to deliver a note in which Wallenberg persuaded the occupying Germans to prevent a Fascist plan to blow up the Budapest ghetto and murder an estimated 70,000 Jews. The note also persuaded the Germans to cancel a final effort to organize a death march of the remaining Jews in Budapest by threatening to have them prosecuted for war crimes once the war was over.

According to Giorgio Perlasca, who posed as the Spanish consul-general to Hungary in the winter of 1944 and saved 5,218 Jews, Pál Szalai lied to save his life during his criminal trial, and the history of the saving is different. Wallenberg (who was already dead at the time of Szalai's deposition) saved hundreds of people but was not directly involved in the plan to save the ghetto. While Perlasca was posing as the Spanish consul-general, he learned of the intention to burn down the ghetto. Shocked and incredulous, he asked for a direct hearing with the Hungarian interior minister Gábor Vajna, in the basement of the Budapest City Hall where he had his headquarters, and threatened legal and economic measures against the "3000 Hungarian citizens" (in fact, a much smaller number) declared by Perlasca as residents of Spain, and similar treatment to Hungarian residents in two Latin American republics, to force the minister to withdraw the project. This actually happened in the following days.

People saved by Wallenberg include biochemist Lars Ernster, who was housed in the Swedish embassy, and Tom Lantos, later a member of the United States House of Representatives, who lived in one of the Swedish protective houses.

The Swedish consulate building still exists as of 2025, on the hill behind the Hotel Gellért, with a reference to Wallenberg at the front.

== Disappearance ==
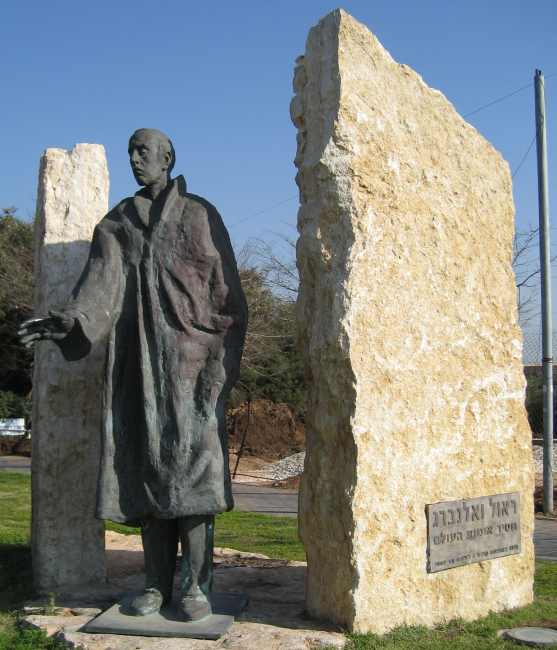
Bronze statue of Raoul Wallenberg in Tel Aviv

On 29 October 1944, elements of the 2nd Ukrainian Front under Marshal Rodion Malinovsky launched an offensive against Budapest. By late December, the city had been encircled by Soviet forces. Despite this, the German commander of Budapest, SS Lieutenant General Karl Pfeffer-Wildenbruch, refused all invitations to surrender, setting in motion a protracted and bloody siege of Budapest. At the height of the fighting, on 17 January 1945, Wallenberg was called to General Malinovsky's headquarters in Debrecen to answer allegations that he was engaged in espionage. According to the wife of Géza Soós, a ringleader of the Hungarian resistance who worked with Wallenberg, he used the opportunity to try to transport copies of the Auschwitz Report to the interim Hungarian government in Debrecen. Wallenberg's last recorded words were, "I'm going to Malinovsky's ... whether as a guest or prisoner I do not know yet."

Documents recovered in 1993 from previously secret Soviet military archives and published in the Swedish newspaper Svenska Dagbladet show that an order for Wallenberg's arrest was issued by Deputy Commissar for Defence (and future Soviet Premier) Nikolai Bulganin and transmitted to Malinovsky's headquarters on the day of Wallenberg's disappearance. In 2003, a review of Soviet wartime correspondences indicated that Vilmos Böhm, a Hungarian politician who was also a Soviet intelligence agent, may have provided Wallenberg's name to SMERSH as a person to detain for possible involvement in espionage.

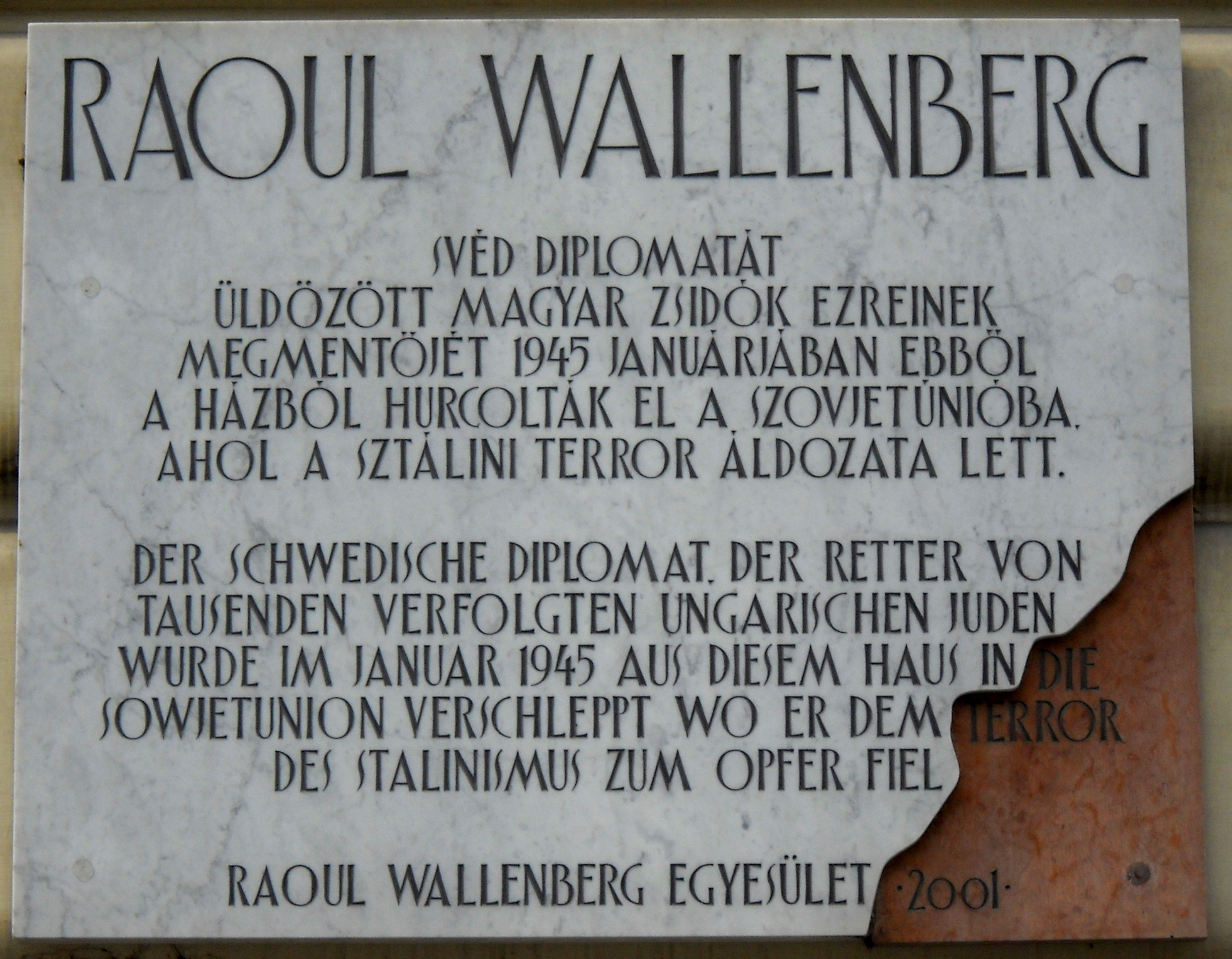
This plaque was affixed to the wall of the building where Wallenberg was abducted by the Soviet authorities.

Information about Wallenberg after his detention is mostly speculative; there were many who claimed to have met him during his imprisonment. Wallenberg was transported by train from Debrecen, through Romania, to Moscow. The Soviet authorities may have moved him to Moscow in the hope of exchanging him for defectors in Sweden. Vladimir Dekanozov notified the Swedish government on 16 January 1945 that Wallenberg was under the protection of Soviet authorities. On 21 January 1945, Wallenberg was transferred to Lubyanka prison and held in cell 123 with fellow prisoner Gustav Richter, who had been a police attaché at the German embassy in Romania. Richter testified in Sweden in 1955 that Wallenberg was interrogated once for about an hour and a half, in early February 1945. On 1 March 1945, Richter was moved from his cell and never saw Wallenberg again.

On 8 March 1945, Soviet-controlled Hungarian radio announced that Wallenberg and his driver had been murdered on their way to Debrecen, suggesting that they had been killed by the Arrow Cross Party or the Gestapo. Sweden's foreign minister, Östen Undén, and its envoy to the Soviet Union, Staffan Söderblom, wrongly assumed that they were dead. In April 1945, W. Averell Harriman, then of the US State Department, offered the Swedish government help in inquiring about Wallenberg's fate, but the offer was declined. Söderblom met with Vyacheslav Molotov and Stalin in Moscow on 15 June 1946. Söderblom, still believing Wallenberg to be dead, ignored talk of an exchange for Russian defectors in Sweden.

=== Death ===
On 6 February 1957, the Soviet government released a document dated 17 July 1947 that stated: "I report that the prisoner Wallenberg who is well-known to you, died suddenly in his cell this night, probably as a result of a heart attack or heart failure. Pursuant to the instructions given by you that I personally have Wallenberg under my care, I request approval to make an autopsy with a view to establishing cause of death.... I have personally notified the minister and it has been ordered that the body be cremated without autopsy." The document was signed by Smoltsov, then the head of the Lubyanka prison infirmary, and addressed to Viktor Abakumov, the Soviet minister of state security. In 1989, Wallenberg's personal belongings were returned to his family, including his passport and cigarette case. Soviet officials said they found the materials when they were upgrading the shelves in a store room.

In 1991, Vyacheslav Nikonov was charged by the Russian government with investigating Wallenberg's fate. He concluded that Wallenberg died in 1947, executed while a prisoner in Lubyanka. He may have been a victim of the C-2 poison (carbylamine-choline-chloride) tested at the poison laboratory of the Soviet secret services.

In Moscow in 2000, Alexander Nikolaevich Yakovlev announced that Wallenberg had been executed in 1947 in Lubyanka prison. He claimed that Vladimir Kryuchkov, the former Soviet secret police chief, told him about the shooting in a private conversation. The statement did not explain why Wallenberg was killed or why the government had lied about it. General Pavel Sudoplatov claimed that Wallenberg died after being poisoned by Grigory Mairanovsky, an NKVD chemist and torturer. In 2000, Russian prosecutor Vladimir Ustinov signed a verdict posthumously rehabilitating Wallenberg and his driver, Langfelder, as "victims of political repression". Files pertinent to Wallenberg were turned over to the chief rabbi of Russia by the Russian government in September 2007. The items were slated to be housed at the Jewish Museum and Tolerance Center in Moscow, which opened in 2012.

In August 2016, new information about Wallenberg's death came to light when the diary of KGB head Ivan Serov surfaced after Serov's granddaughter found the diary hidden in a wall of her house. "I have no doubts that Wallenberg was liquidated in 1947," Serov wrote.

=== Disputes about his death ===
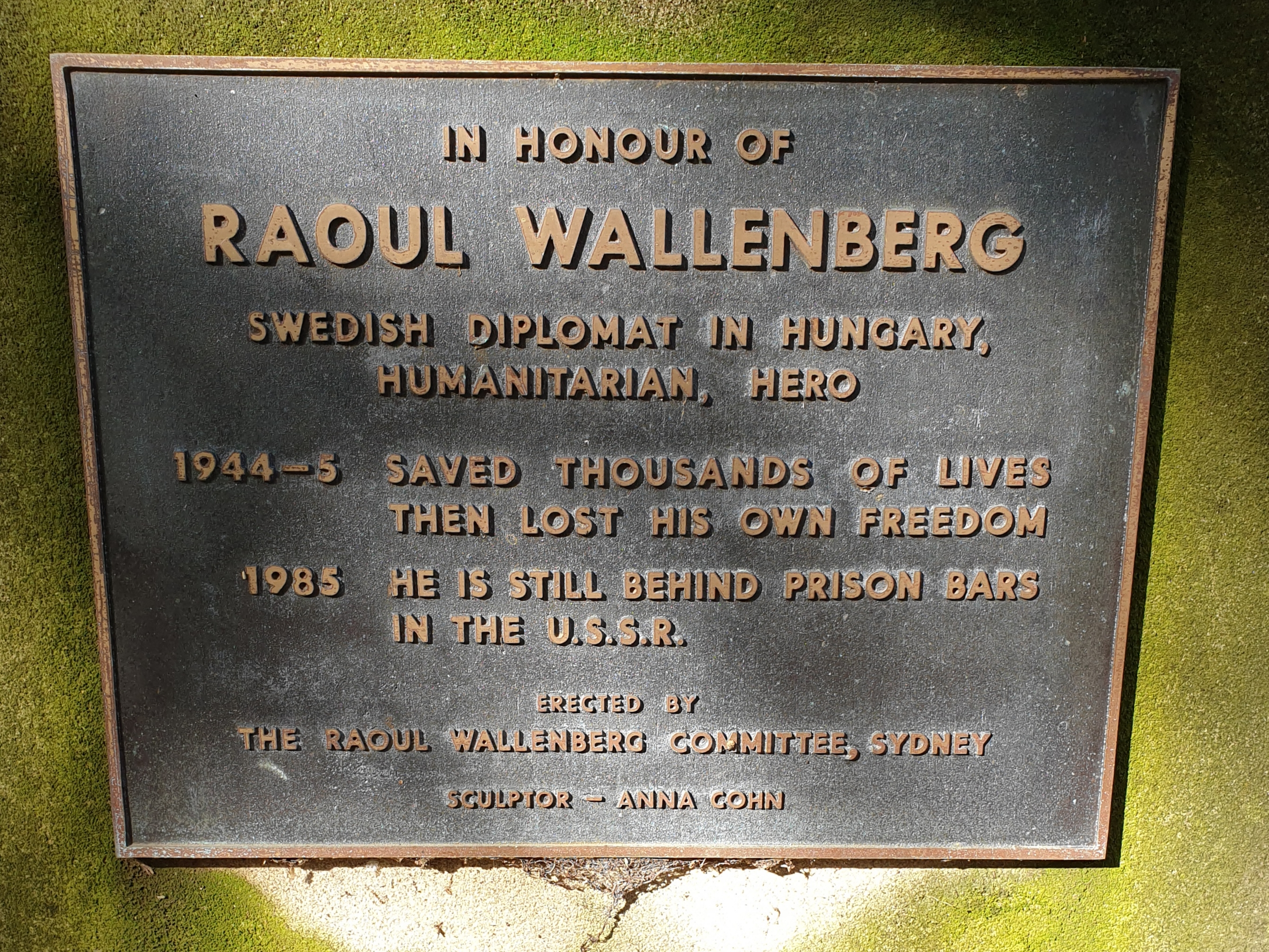
A plaque in Wallenberg's honour in Woollahra, New South Wales that claims that, as of 1985, he was "still behind prison bars in the U.S.S.R."

Several former prisoners have claimed to have seen Wallenberg after his reported death in 1947. In February 1949, former German Colonel Theodor von Dufving, a prisoner of war, provided statements concerning Wallenberg. In the transit camp of Kirov, while being moved to Vorkuta, Dufving encountered a prisoner dressed in civilian clothes with his own special guard. The prisoner claimed that he was a Swedish diplomat and said he was there "through a great error".

Nazi hunter Simon Wiesenthal searched for Wallenberg and collected several testimonies. For example, British businessman Greville Wynne, who was imprisoned in the Lubyanka prison in 1962 for his connection to KGB defector Oleg Penkovsky, stated that he had talked to, but could not see the face of, a man who claimed to be a Swedish diplomat. Efim (or Yefim) Moshinsky claims to have seen Wallenberg on Wrangel Island in 1962. An eyewitness asserted that she had seen Wallenberg in the 1960s in a Soviet prison where she worked.

During a private conversation about the conditions of detention in Soviet prisons at a Communist Party reception in the mid-1970s, a KGB general is reported to have said that "conditions could not be that harsh, given that in Lubyanka prison there is some foreign prisoner who had been there now for almost three decades."

The last reported sightings of Wallenberg were by two independent witnesses who said they had evidence that he was in prison in November 1987. John Farkas was a resistance fighter during World War II and was the last man claiming to have seen Wallenberg alive. Farkas' son has stated that there have been sightings of Wallenberg "up into the 1980s in Soviet prisons and psychiatric hospitals."

=== Attempts to find Wallenberg ===
In the late 1970s, Annette Lantos, one of the people rescued by Wallenberg, established the International Free Wallenberg Committee to pressure the Soviet Union into providing answers about his disappearance. She later tried to enlist US President Jimmy Carter to seek further information by sending in a postcard to the Ask President Carter radio show and by working with Simon Wiesenthal and Jack Anderson to tell Wallenberg's story through a Washington Post column.

Noticing these efforts and angry that Sweden had not gone far enough in their efforts to find Wallenberg, Nina Lagergren, Wallenberg's half-sister, traveled to the United States to campaign with Lantos. The efforts of Lantos and Lagergren eventually led to the creation of the Free Wallenberg Committee in Congress, led by Senator Daniel Patrick Moynihan, whose goal was to determine what happened to Wallenberg. Lantos' husband and fellow Holocaust survivor, Tom, later continued the congressional push for answers regarding Wallenberg after being elected to the House of Representatives in 1980.

==== Honorary citizenship ====
One of Tom Lantos' first acts as a representative in Congress was to recognize Wallenberg as an honorary American citizen. After being told by President Carter that the Soviet Union would not answer questions to America about a non-American citizen, Lantos worked with Senator Moynihan to pass a bill recognizing Wallenberg as such. The effort grew as 60 Minutes aired a piece on Wallenberg while the resolution was moving through Congress. Newly elected President Ronald Reagan watched the program and joined Lantos and Moynihan in pushing for the resolution to pass. It eventually passed by a 396–2 vote and was quickly signed into law by Reagan, making Wallenberg the second person in history (Winston Churchill being the first) to be made an honorary American citizen by an act of Congress.

With his citizenship now granted, the Wallenberg family successfully sued the Soviet Union in 1984 in an American Federal District Court over his disappearance for $39 million, or $1 million per year that Wallenberg's fate has been unknown. However, the Soviet Union ignored the suit and did not pay any of the damages awarded by the judge. They also did not offer any information into his disappearance.

==== Efforts outside America ====
Raoul Wallenberg's half-brother, Guy von Dardel, a well-known physicist, retired from CERN and dedicated the rest of his life to finding out his half-brother's fate. He traveled to the Soviet Union about fifty times for discussions and research, including an examination of the Vladimir prison records. Over the years, von Dardel compiled a 50,000-page archive of interviews, journal articles, letters, and other documents related to his quest. In 1991, Dardel initiated a Swedish-Russian working group to search eleven separate military and government archives from the former Soviet Union for information about Wallenberg's fate, but the group was not able to find useful information. Many, including von Dardel and his daughters, Louise and Marie, do not accept the various versions of Wallenberg's death. They continue to request that the archives in Russia, Sweden, and Hungary become available to impartial researchers.

==== Present-day attempts ====
In 2012, Russian lieutenant general Vasily Khristoforov, head of the registration branch of the Russian Federal Security Service, said that the Wallenberg case was still open. He also dismissed any allegation of a continuing cover-up, saying that "this is another state and a different special service" from the Soviet Union and the services in charge of holding Wallenberg.

=== Declared dead in absentia ===
On 29 March 2016, an announcement was made by the Swedish Tax Agency that a petition to have Wallenberg declared dead in absentia was submitted. It stated that if he did not report to the Tax Agency before 14 October 2016, he would be legally declared dead.

Wallenberg was declared dead legally in October 2016, as announced through the petition. Consistent with the approach used in other cases where the circumstances of death were not known, the Swedish tax agency recorded the date of his death as 31 July 1952, five years after he went missing.

== Intelligence connections ==
In May 1996, the Central Intelligence Agency (CIA) released thousands of previously classified documents regarding Raoul Wallenberg, in response to requests filed under the Freedom of Information Act. The documents, along with an investigation conducted by the news magazine U.S. News & World Report, seemingly confirmed the long-held suspicion that Wallenberg had served as an American intelligence asset during his time in Hungary. Wallenberg's name appeared on a roster found in the National Archives which listed the names of operatives associated with the CIA's wartime predecessor, the Office of Strategic Services (OSS). The documents also included a 1954 memo from an anonymous CIA source that identified a Hungarian-exile living in Stockholm who, according to the author: "assisted in inserting Wallenberg into Hungary during WWII as an agent of OSS". Another declassified memorandum written in 1990 by the curator of the CIA's Historical Intelligence Collection, William Henhoeffer, characterized the conclusion that Wallenberg was working for the OSS while in Budapest as being "essentially correct".

Of more significance was a communique transmitted by the OSS Secret Intelligence Branch in Bari, Italy on 7 November 1944. This message apparently acknowledged that Wallenberg was acting as a liaison between the OSS and Magyar Fuggetlensegi Mozgalom (the Hungarian Independence Movement or MFM), an underground anti-Nazi resistance organization operating in Budapest. The OSS message noted Wallenberg's contacts with Géza Soos, a high-ranking MFM member. The communique further explained that Soos "may only be contacted" through the Swedish legation in Budapest, which was Wallenberg's workplace and also served as the operational center for his attempts to aid the Hungarian Jews. The same message's assertion that Wallenberg "will know if he (Soos) is not in Budapest" is also curious, in that by November 1944 Soos was in hiding and knowledge of his whereabouts would have been available only to persons closely involved with the MFM. This conclusion is given further weight by additional evidence suggesting that secret communications between the MFM and US intelligence were being transmitted to Washington by the Stockholm office of Iver C. Olsen, the American OSS operative who initially recruited Wallenberg to go to Budapest in June 1944.

This particular disclosure gave rise to speculation that, in addition to his attempts to rescue the Hungarian Jews, Wallenberg may have also been engaged in a separate effort intended to undermine Hungary's pro-Nazi government on behalf of the OSS. If true, this would seem to add some credence to the potential explanation that it was his association with Western intelligence that led to Wallenberg being targeted by Soviet authorities in January 1945.

Several other humanitarians who had helped refugees during World War II accordingly disappeared behind the Iron Curtain in the period 1949–50, several years after Wallenberg's disappearance. OSS ties may have been of interest to the Soviets, but are not a complete explanation because some of those detained, i.e. Hermann Field and Herta Field, had not worked for the OSS. All of these humanitarians, however, like Wallenberg, had interacted with many anti-fascist and socialist refugees during the War, and this experience was used in the Stalin regime's factional politics and show trials.

== Family ==
In 2009, reporter Joshua Prager wrote an article in the Wall Street Journal profiling the long-term toll that Raoul Wallenberg's disappearance had on his family. His mother Maj and his stepfather Fredrik von Dardel spent the rest of their lives searching for their son. They both died by suicide, overdosing on pills two days apart in 1979. Their daughter, Nina Lagergren, Raoul's half-sister, attributed their suicide to their despair about never finding their son. Lagergren and Raoul's half-brother Guy von Dardel established organizations and worked to find their brother or confirmation of his death. At the request of their parents, they were to assume he was alive until the year 2000.

During the war, the Wallenberg bank, Stockholms Enskilda Bank, collaborated with the German government. United States Secretary of the Treasury Henry Morgenthau Jr. considered Jacob Wallenberg strongly pro-German, and in 1945, the Federal Bureau of Investigation subjected the Bank to a blockade from engaging in business in the United States that was only lifted in 1947. Author Alan Lelchuk who interviewed, amongst others, Wallenberg's KGB interrogator, wrote a novel that imagines the more powerful of the family may have chosen not to use their influence to locate Raoul as it could have drawn attention to their misdeeds, and they may have considered him an embarrassment, not only for being a man of morality, but his possible homosexuality.

== Legacy ==
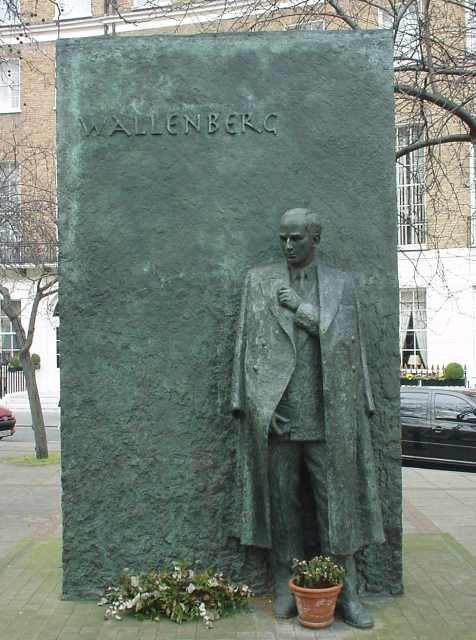
Bronze statue of Raoul Wallenberg at London near Marble Arch

=== Honours ===
A considerable number of honours, memorials and statues have been dedicated to the memory of Wallenberg. Among them, the International Raoul Wallenberg Foundation, a non-governmental organization which researches Holocaust rescuers and advocates for their recognition, was named in his honor. In Serbia, the FIND RAOUL Organization was founded in 2011 by pupils and university students, in honour of Raoul Wallenberg and dedicated to preserving his legacy and promoting his humanitarian values.

=== Wallenberg myth ===
In a 2004 paper, Hungarian historian and Holocaust survivor Randolph L. Braham discussed the mythologizing of Wallenberg's rescue activities. Braham notes that Wallenberg's rescue activities did not start in earnest until the Arrow Cross coup in October 1944, and reached their greatest proportions during the siege. He found that through personal heroism and diplomatic support, Wallenberg managed to save about 7,000 to 9,000 Jews. However, during the Cold War, his death was exploited in Western anti-Soviet propaganda; in order to make the "Soviet crime" seem worse, his rescue operations were greatly exaggerated. Wallenberg was incorrectly identified as the savior of all Jews in Budapest, or at least 100,000 of them, in official statements as well as many popular books and documentaries. As a result, the rescue efforts of other agents in Budapest have been marginalized or ignored.

Israeli historian Yehuda Bauer, who puts the number of lives saved by Wallenberg at 4,500, states Lutz and other neutral emissaries saved more Jews, but Wallenberg was the only one who frequently confronted the Nazis and their Arrow Cross accomplices. Although "fact and fiction mixed" in the testimony of Jewish survivors about Wallenberg after the war, Bauer writes, Wallenberg's "fame was certainly justified by his extraordinary exploits". Bauer also points out that the focus on heroic actions taken by Wallenberg and other non-Jewish rescuers obscures the heroism of Jews who also carried out rescue actions in Budapest in the final months and were forgotten after liberation. According to Bauer, Wallenberg had a modest personality and would have rejected fictionalized anecdotes and exaggerated totals.

=== In popular culture ===
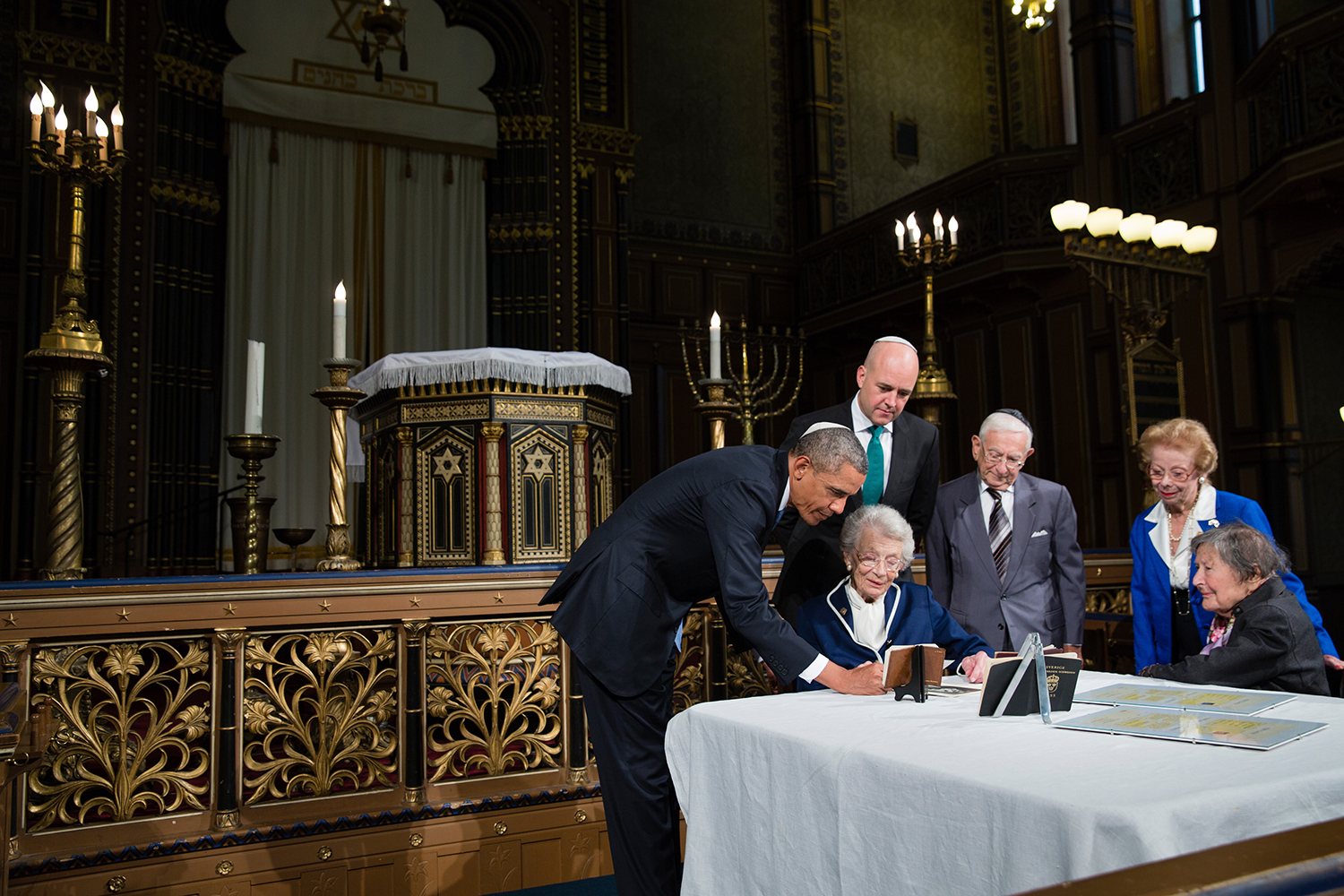
US President Barack Obama and Swedish Prime Minister Fredrik Reinfeldt viewing possessions of Wallenberg at the Great Synagogue of Stockholm, September 2013

==== Film ====
A number of films have been made of Wallenberg's life, including the 1985 made-for-television movie Wallenberg: A Hero's Story (1985), starring Richard Chamberlain, the 1990 Swedish production Good Evening, Mr. Wallenberg, featuring Stellan Skarsgård, and various documentaries, such as Raoul Wallenberg: Buried Alive (1984), the AFI Award-winning Raoul Wallenberg, Between The Lines (1985) and Searching for Wallenberg (2003). He also appears in the Spanish television series El ángel de Budapest and is played by Iván Fenyő - the series features relatives and the Winnipeg lawyer still piloting inquiries into his case, and was released in Canada and broadcast on the Bravo! network.

He is depicted in the 2026 movie The Swedish Connection, played by Per Gavatin, during the events leading up to the Rescue of the Danish Jews. Wallenberg serves as the movie's narrator & arrives at the end to learn how the protagonists accomplished the rescue so that he can carry on that work.

==== Art ====
Wallenberg is featured prominently in the work of painter and Holocaust survivor Alice Lok Cahana whose father was saved by Wallenberg.

==== Music ====
- "Wallenberg" (1982) is a track by The (Hypothetical) Prophets, a band project of Bernard Szajner.
- "Raoul Wallenberg" (1991) is a track on the album Rude Awakening by Andy Irvine.

==== Opera ====
- Wallenberg. Opera premiered at the Opernhaus Dortmund on 5 May 2001.
  - Composer Erkki-Sven Tüür, libretto by Lutz Hübner
- Raoul. Opera premiered at the Theater Bremen on 21 February 2008.
  - Composer Gershon Kingsley, libretto by Michael Kunze

== See also ==
- List of unsolved deaths
- Individuals and groups assisting Jews during the Holocaust
- Chiune Sugihara
- Ho Feng-Shan
- Gerrit van der Waals
- Béla Horváth
- Raoul Wallenberg Centre for Human Rights
- Raoul Wallenberg International Movement for Humanity
- Scandinavian theatre of World War II
