= Raoul Wallenberg Committee of the United States =

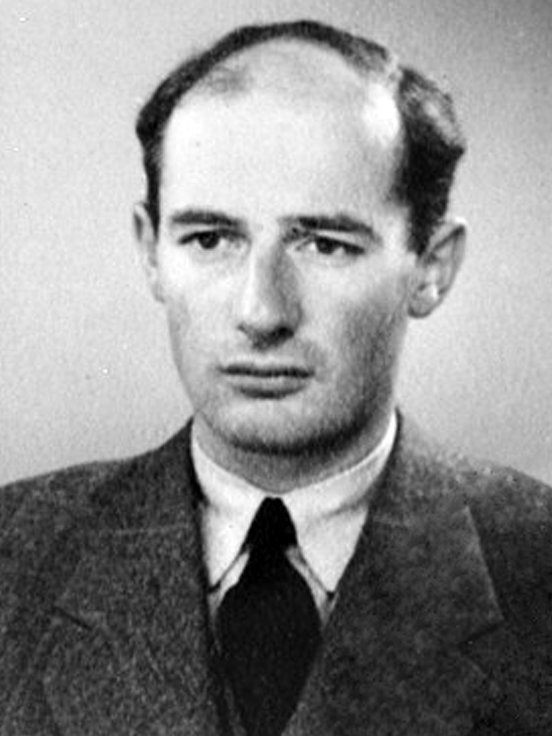
Raoul Wallenberg in 1944

The Raoul Wallenberg Committee of the United States was created in May 1981 to "perpetuate the humanitarian ideals and the nonviolent courage of Raoul Wallenberg".

It bestows the Raoul Wallenberg Awards on individuals, organizations and communities that reflect Wallenberg's "humanitarian spirit, personal courage and nonviolent action in the face of enormous odds". As at 2013, the current chairman and CEO is Rachel Oestreicher Bernheim, a position that she has held since at least 1995.

== Accomplishments ==
- Funded five Raoul Wallenberg International Human Rights Fellowships and a Swedish Fulbright Fellowship.
- Published A Hero for Our Time and Raoul Wallenberg's Children.
- Houses the Wallenberg research center.
- Circulates an exhibit, A Tribute to Raouls Walleberg, throughout the United States.
- Lobbied to add Raoul Wallenberg's name to the official list of American POW's.
- Sponsored the renaming of the sidewalk fronting the United Nations as "Raoul Wallenberg Walk".
- In 1985 the committee began work for the issuance of a United States postal stamp to honor Wallenberg. The stamp was issued in 1997.
- Established October 5, 1989 as Raoul Wallenberg Recognition Day by a Congressional Resolution.

== Awards ==
- Raoul Wallenberg Award
- The Raoul Wallenberg A Hero For Our Time Award
- The Raoul Wallenberg Civic Courage Award

== Honorary Chairmen ==
- Per Anger
- Guy von Dardel
- Nina Lagergren
- Krister Stendahl
- Simon Wiesenthal
