= Gusztáv Hennyey =

Hungarian politician and military officer

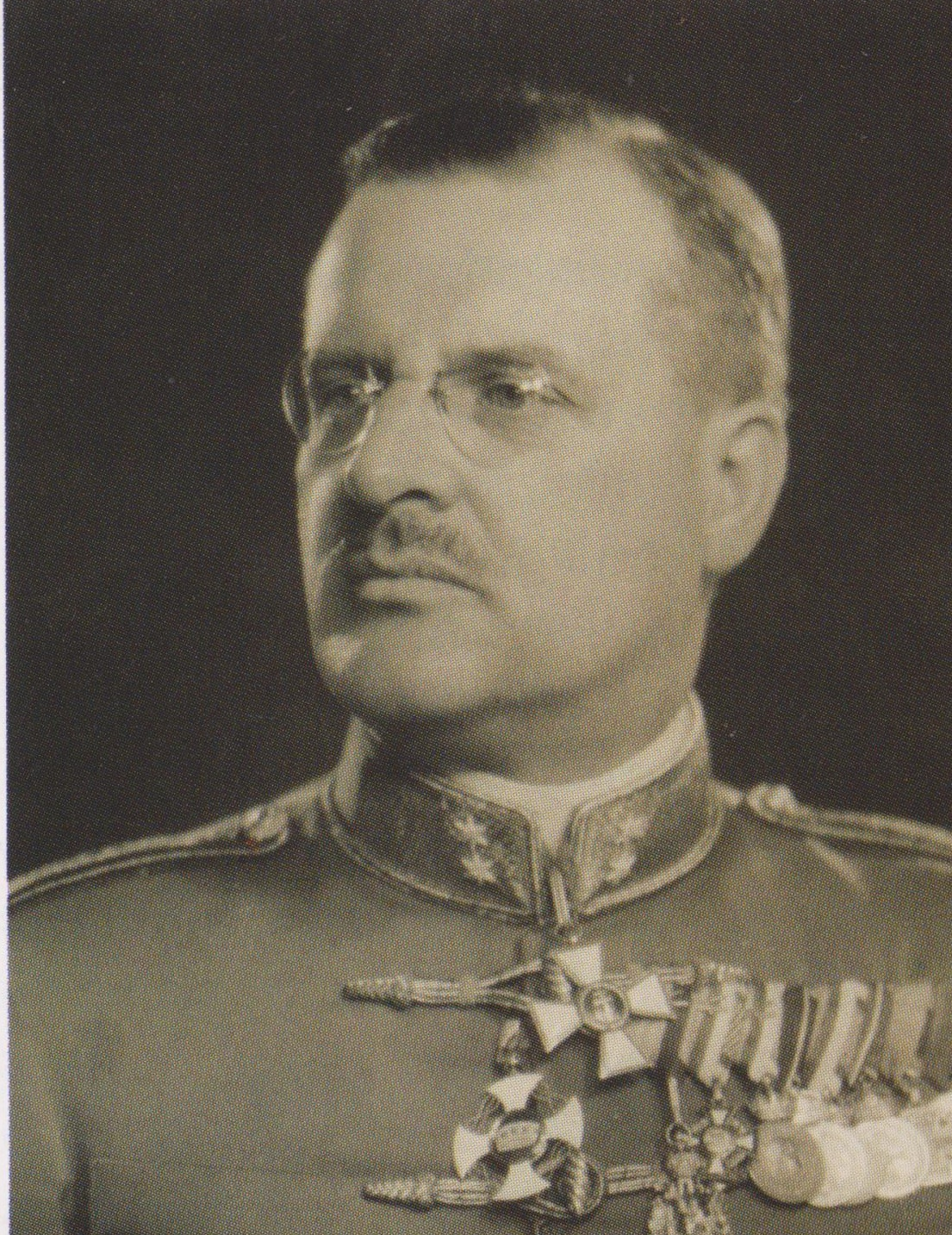

Minister of Foreign Affairs of Hungary
- In office 29 August 1944 – 16 October 1944
- Prime Minister: Géza Lakatos
- Preceded by: Döme Sztójay
- Succeeded by: Gábor Kemény

Personal details
- Born: 25 September 1888 Kolozsvár, Austria-Hungary
- Died: 14 June 1977 (aged 88) Munich, West Germany

Military service
- Allegiance: Austria-Hungary; Hungary
- Years of service: 1907–1945
- Rank: Colonel General
- Commands: 5th Brigade; 2nd Corps
- Battles/wars: World War I World War II

Gusztáv Hennyey (25 September 1888 – 14 June 1977) was a Hungarian politician and military officer, who served as Minister of Foreign Affairs in 1944 for a month. After the First World War he worked as a military attaché in Paris, Belgrade and Athens. He returned to home in 1933 and became Chief of Military Intelligence at the Ministry of Defence. When Hungary entered to the Second World War (1941) he served as commander of the Second Corps.

In 1944, Géza Lakatos appointed him Minister of Foreign Affairs. After the Arrow Cross Party's coup (15 October 1944) he was arrested along with most of the ministers and moderate, magisterial politicians. Hennyey was taken to Sopron and later Bavaria, when the Soviet Red Army approached continually. After the war the new Hungarian government demanded his extradition like as a war criminal. The Office of Strategic Services captured Hennyey but set him free, stating, that he was not considered a war criminal. Hennyey lived in Munich until his death.

Political offices
Preceded by Döme Sztójay	Minister of Foreign Affairs; 1944	Succeeded by Gábor Kemény
