= Rokycany, Prešov District =

Rokycany
- Municipality
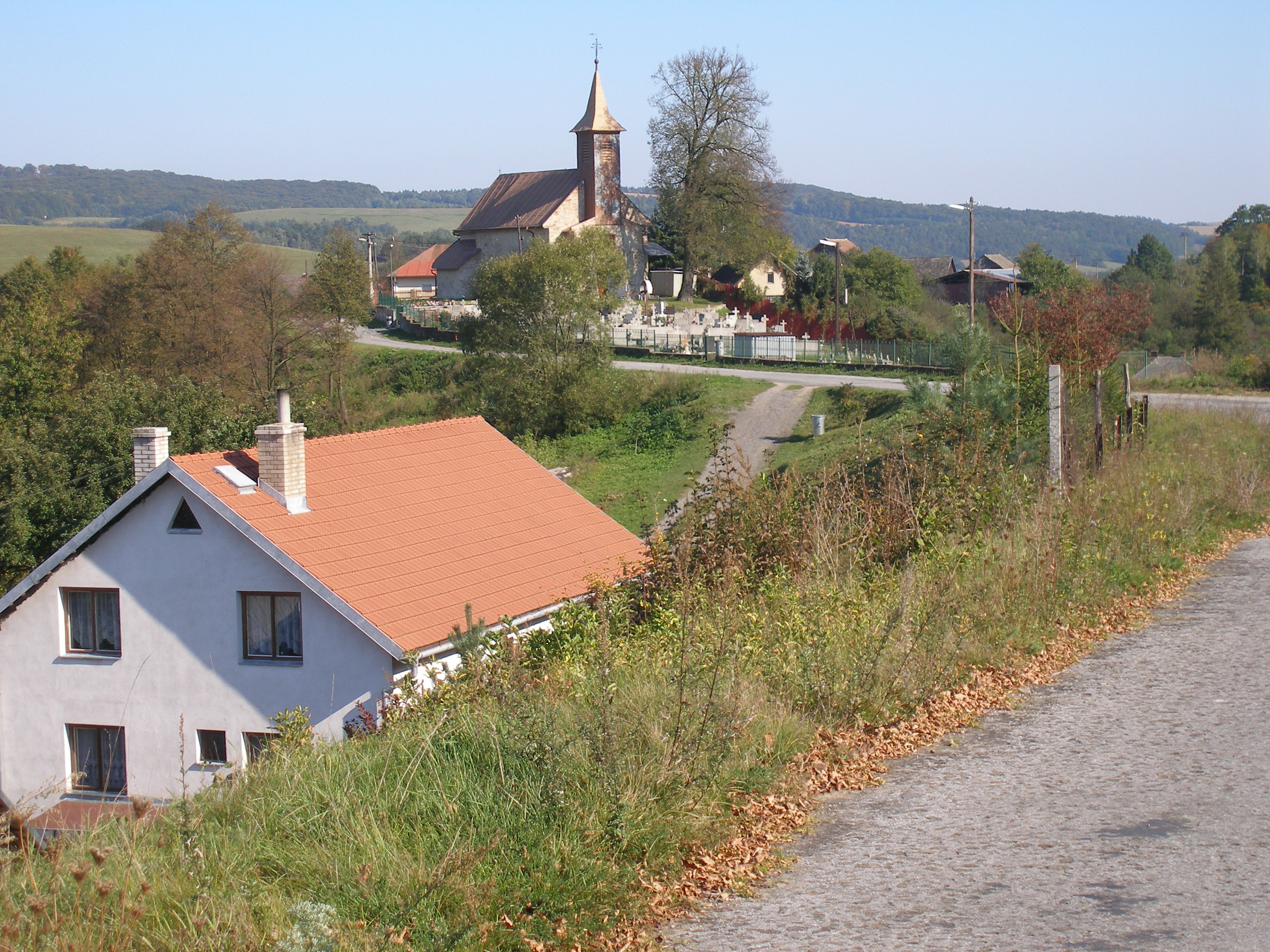

- Flag

- Location of Rokycany in the Prešov Region Location of Rokycany in Slovakia
- Coordinates: 48.97°N 21.15°E
- Country: Slovakia
- Region: Prešov Region
- District: Prešov District
- First mentioned: 1295

Area
  - Total: 5.78 km^{2} (2.23 sq mi)
- Elevation: 308 m (1,010 ft)

Population (2025)
  - Total: 1,105
- Time zone: UTC+1 (CET)
  - Summer (DST): UTC+2 (CEST)
- Postal code: 824 1
- Area code: +421 51
- Vehicle registration plate (until 2022): PO
- Website: www.obecrokycany.sk

Rokycany (Rusyn: Рокіцані, Hungarian: Berki) is a village in Prešov District in the Prešov Region in East Slovakia.

== History ==
In historical records the village was first mentioned in 1295.

== Geography ==
The municipality lies at an altitude of 308 metres (1,010 ft) and covers an area of 5.78 km^{2} (2.23 sq mi) (2025).

== Population ==
Population statistic (10 years)
Year	1995	2005	2015	2025
Count	645	810	1036	1105
Difference		+25.58%	+27.90%	+6.66%

Population statistic
Year	2024	2025
Count	1076	1105
Difference		+2.69%

It has a population of 1105 people (31 December 2025).

=== Ethnicity ===
Census 2021 (1+ %)
Ethnicity	Number	Fraction
Slovak	1009	94.83%
Romani	396	37.21%
Not found out	50	4.69%
Total	1064	

In year 2021 was 1064 people by ethnicity 1009 as Slovak, 396 as Romani, 50 as Not found out, 4 as Czech, 2 as Russian and 1 as Rusyn.

Note on population: The difference values of population numbers in the table "Population statistic" and in the sections "Ethnicity" & "Religion" is caused by the use of various statistical methods.

The vast majority of the municipality's population consists of the local Roma community. In 2019, they constituted an estimated 82% of the local population.

=== Religion ===
Census 2021 (1+ %)
Religion	Number	Fraction
Roman Catholic Church	739	69.45%
Evangelical Church	135	12.69%
Apostolic Church	106	9.96%
Not found out	33	3.1%
Greek Catholic Church	24	2.26%
None	16	1.5%
Total	1064	

In year 2021 was 1064 people by religion 739 from Roman Catholic Church, 135 from Evangelical Church, 106 from Apostolic Church, 33 from Not found out, 24 from Greek Catholic Church, 16 from None, 5 from Christian Congregations in Slovakia, 3 from Other and not ascertained christian church, 2 from Ad hoc movements and 1 from Calvinist Church.

== Notable people ==
Hungarian politician János Gyöngyösi, who served as Minister of Foreign Affairs between 1944 and 1947.
