= Gerrit van der Waals =

Dutch military officer and resistance member (1920–1948)

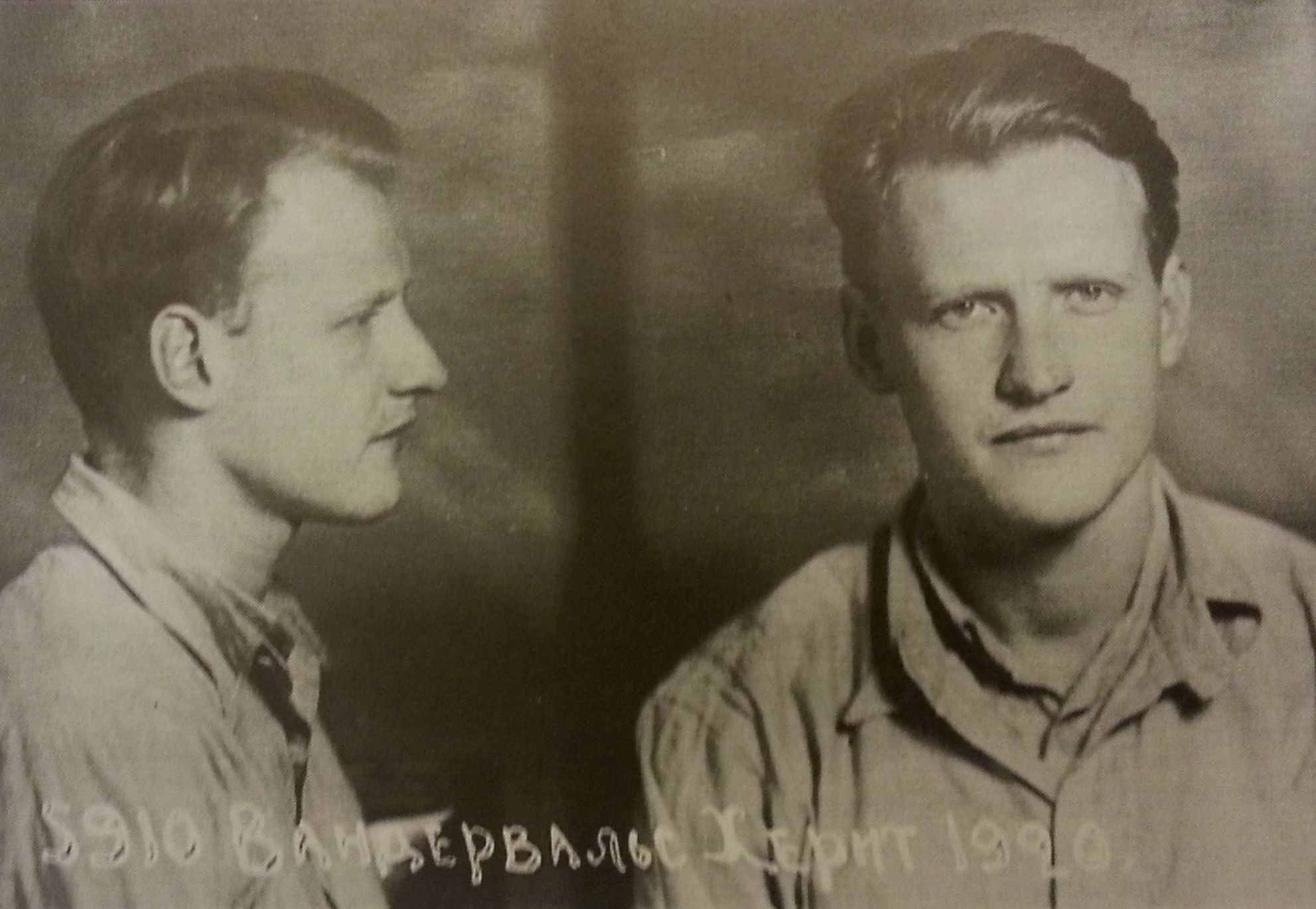
- Gerrit van der Waals in 1945; photograph from a Soviet prison
- Born: 24 April 1920 Surabaya, Dutch East Indies
- Died: 11 August 1948 (aged 28) Moscow, Soviet Union
- Allegiance: Netherlands
- Branch: Royal Netherlands East Indies Army
- Rank: Second lieutenant
- Conflicts: World War II
- Awards: Bronze Cross

Gerrit Hendricus Maria van der Waals (24 April 1920 – 11 August 1948) was a Dutch officer of the Royal Netherlands East Indies Army and a member of the wartime resistance.

After the German invasion of the Netherlands in 1940, he escaped from a German POW camp in 1943 and later was active in anti-Nazi resistance in Hungary. Arrested by the advancing Soviet forces in late 1944, he was imprisoned in Moscow, accused of aiding anti-Soviet forces, and died there in 1948. He was posthumously awarded the Dutch Bronze Cross.

== Biography ==
Van der Waals was born in Surabaya, then part of the Dutch East Indies.

After finishing secondary school (HBS) in 1937 he moved to the Netherlands to enter the three-year program at the Royal Military Academy in Breda. Following the German invasion of the Netherlands and occupation, the cadets (including van der Waals) and other Dutch professional officers were arrested by the Germans and, in 1942, deported from the Netherlands. (Meanwhile, in July 1940, van der Waals was commissioned as tweede luitenant—Dutch equivalent to second lieutenant.) He was sent to the POW camp Stalag 371 at Stanisławów (now Ivano-Frankivsk).

On 21 August 1943 he became the first Dutch officer to escape from that camp; he was also the first Dutch prisoner of war to reach Hungary. After trekking more than 100 km on foot across the Carpathian Mountains, he reached what was then neutral Hungary, arriving in Budapest on 1 September 1943.

During the German occupation of Hungary in March 1944, van der Waals, along with other Dutch officers who had arrived after him, engaged in resistance activity—described in various sources as Hungarian, Dutch, or Protestant networks—and cooperated with members of the Swedish diplomatic mission involved in aiding Jews in Budapest.

Accounts of his subsequent fate vary, but all agree that he was arrested by Soviet forces toward the end of 1944. Having failed in earlier attempts to reach Allied lines via Yugoslavia or Romania, he tried again in December 1944 by contacting Soviet troops advancing south of Budapest, hoping for help. In exchange, he provided information on German-Hungarian troop dispositions and anti-aircraft defenses around Budapest (see Siege of Budapest). Because of his appearance (tall, blond, blue-eyed) and forged papers, the Soviets suspected he was a German deserter or a spy; he was later also accused of working with British intelligence.

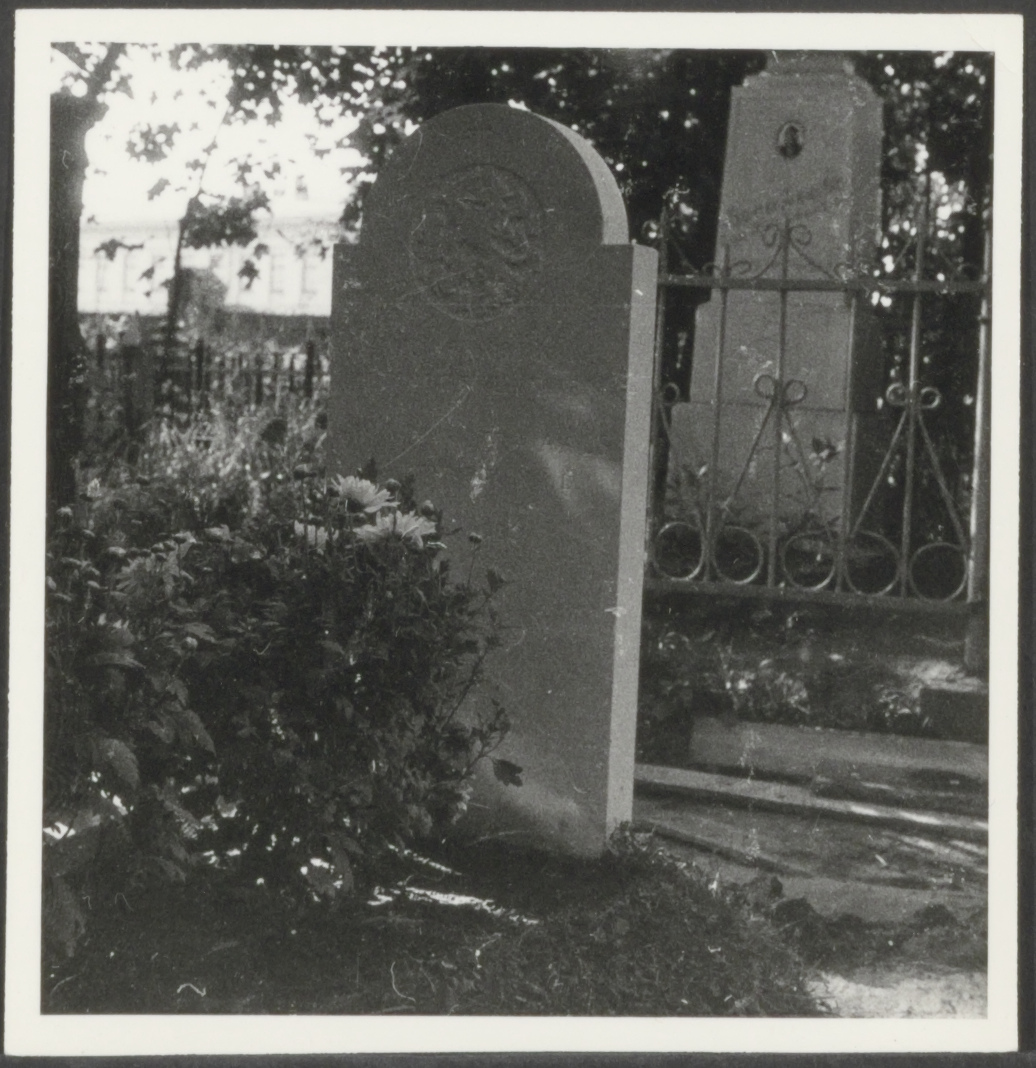
Gerrit van der Waals's cenotaph in the USSR, 1948

He was detained by Soviet troops (probably elements of the 4th Guards Army) around 8 December 1944 and handed over to SMERSH. Transported via Kyiv with German POWs to Moscow, he was imprisoned in the Lubyanka prison in January 1945. He also spent time in Lefortovo Prison, where he was intensively interrogated and tortured, and was later moved to Butyrka prison. He contracted tuberculosis; his condition deteriorated to the point that he was admitted to a prison hospital in April 1945. He died in custody on 11 August 1948. According to some sources, he never made a confession, while others report the allegation that he acknowledged forging documents that had been transferred to British authorities, which had, in turn, passed them to "fascists, other war criminals and opponents of the Soviet interests".

In 1948 the Dutch authorities posthumously awarded him the Bronze Cross for his successful escape from a German POW camp.

For years Soviet authorities denied knowledge of his fate. Only on 28 August 1955 did they acknowledge that Gerrit van der Waals had died in Moscow; his remains were cremated, and the location of the urn is unknown. In October 1958 the Dutch Oorlogsgravenstichting (War Graves Foundation) received permission to place a symbolic stone (cenotaph) bearing his name at Vvedenskoye Cemetery in Moscow.

== Legacy ==
His fate has been compared to that of the better-known Swedish diplomat Raoul Wallenberg, who organized aid to Jews in Budapest and was likewise seized by the Soviets.
