= Iver C. Olsen =

Iver C. Olsen (1904 – November 5, 1960) was an accountant for the Office of Strategic Services and the War Refugee Board in Stockholm during World War II. In that latter capacity he provided WRB funds to Raoul Wallenberg in his efforts to rescue the Hungarian Jews.

== Biography ==
He was born in 1904 and worked for the US Department of Commerce in the 1930s and for the Treasury Department in World War II. Assigned to work in Sweden, he handled Special Fund accounting for the Office of Strategic Services and handled funds from the War Refugee Board for the rescue of refugees. Following the end of the war he acted as a representative for the International Cooperation Administration. In 1954 he was the Washington, D.C., representative of Tripp and Co. He died on November 5, 1960.

== Publication ==
- Iver C. Olsen; Rights of foreign shareholders of European corporations (United States Bureau of Foreign and Domestic Commerce) (1929) ISBN B0008AWPV4
