= Imre Horváth =

Hungarian politician (1901–1958)

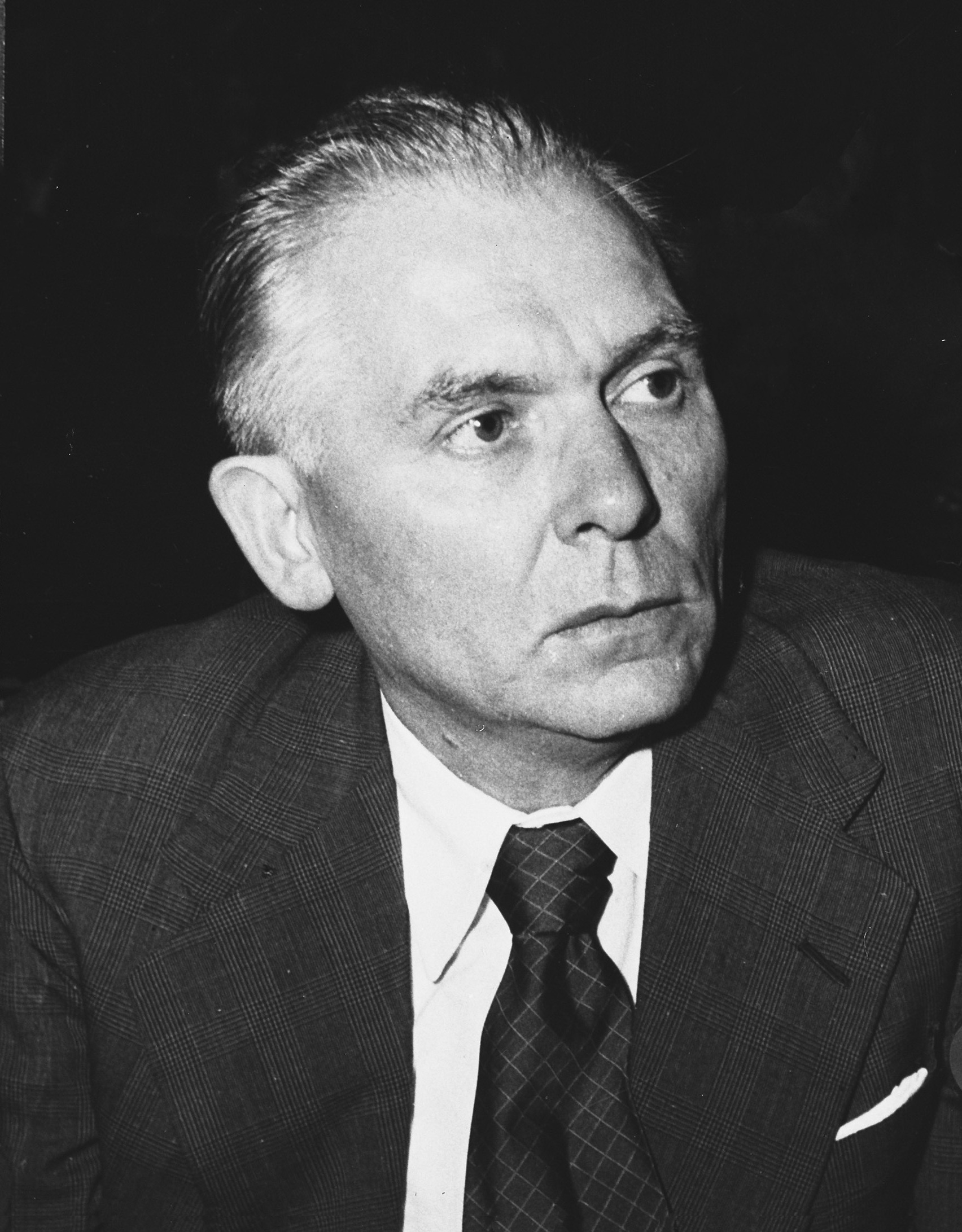

Minister of Foreign Affairs of Hungary
- In office 30 July 1956 – 2 November 1956
- Prime Minister: András Hegedüs; Imre Nagy
- Preceded by: János Boldóczki
- Succeeded by: Imre Nagy
- In office 4 November 1956 – 2 February 1958
- Prime Minister: János Kádár; Ferenc Münnich
- Preceded by: Imre Nagy
- Succeeded by: Endre Sík

Personal details
- Born: 19 November 1901 Budapest, Austria-Hungary
- Died: 2 February 1958 (aged 56) Budapest, People's Republic of Hungary
- Party: MKP, MDP, MSZMP
- Profession: politician, engineer

Imre Horváth (19 November 1901 – 2 February 1958) was a Hungarian politician, who served as Minister of Foreign Affairs twice: in 1956 and after the Hungarian Revolution of 1956 until his death. In 1918, he joined the Communist Party of Hungary (KMP). Despite his young age, he was one of the organizers of the labour movements. During the Hungarian Soviet Republic, he worked for the political police. After the fall of the communist system, he was interned. After prison, he made connections with the illegal communist party. He was again imprisoned, for 10 years. He was sent to the Soviet Union in a prisoner exchange. He finished his studies and worked as an engineer in Moscow. In 1933, he returned home, but was soon arrested. For 10 years, he was held in prison at Szeged.

== Life ==
He was born into a working-class family, the son of Mihály Horváth and Anna Troszler. He trained as a journeyman in a telephone factory. In 1916, he became one of the main organizers of the telephone factory journeyman strike. In 1918, he was a founding member of the Communist Party of Hungary. In 1919, he participated in the establishment of the Hungarian Soviet Republic, served as a political officer in the Red Army, and served in the political police alongside Ottó Korvin. After the fall of the proletarian dictatorship, he was interned, and after his release, in 1920, he helped reorganize the illegal KMP, for which he was arrested by the authorities in the spring of 1921 and sentenced to ten years in prison.

Released in 1922 in a prisoner exchange with the Soviet Union, he emigrated to Moscow. In 1926, he became a librarian at the Marx–Engels Institute, and in 1932, as a student at the Technical University, he earned a degree in mechanical engineering. On the orders of the Communist Party, he came to Hungary in 1933 to help the Communist Party, which had gone underground. He was arrested again in November 1934. He was imprisoned in the Csillag prison in Szeged until the German occupation of Hungary (March 1944).

In the spring of 1944, the Nazis sent him to Dachau. In 1945, he returned to Hungary. He worked for some embassies. From 1956 to 1958, he was foreign affairs minister, except during the 1956 Revolution when Imre Nagy held this position. Horváth was the leader of the Hungarian delegation to the United Nations after the revolution.

On 31 January 1958, he underwent surgery for gallstones and died at dawn on 3 February due to complications from the operation.

Diplomatic posts
Preceded by Elek Bolgár	Envoy extraordinary to the United Kingdom; 1951–1953	Succeeded by János Katona
Political offices
Preceded by János Boldóczki	Minister of Foreign Affairs; 1956	Succeeded by Imre Nagy
Preceded by Imre Nagy	Minister of Foreign Affairs; 1956–1958	Succeeded by Endre Sík
