= Károly Kiss (politician) =

Hungarian politician (1903–1983)

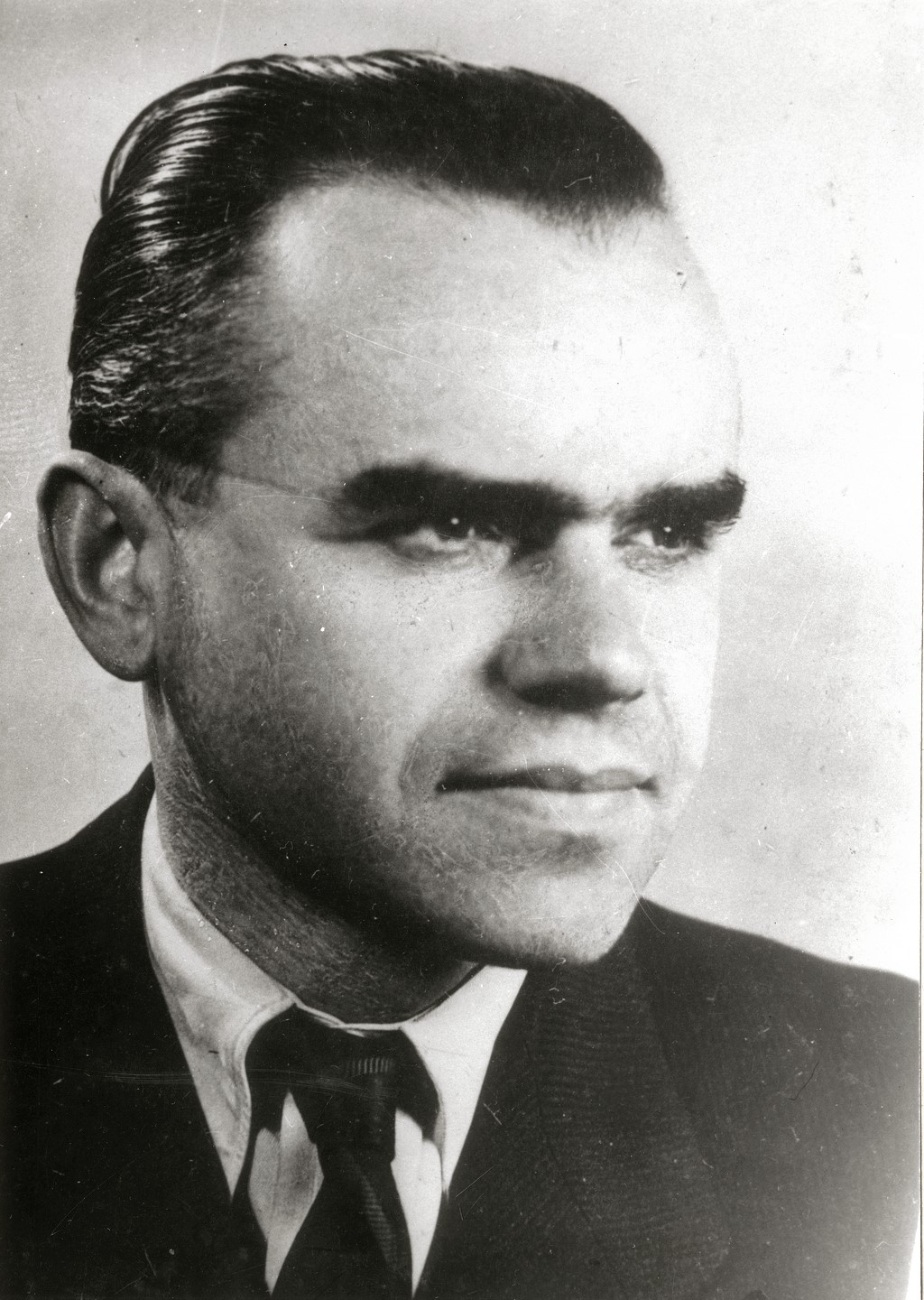

Minister of Foreign Affairs of Hungary
- In office 12 May 1951 – 14 November 1952
- Preceded by: Gyula Kállai
- Succeeded by: Erik Molnár

Personal details
- Born: September 24, 1903 Bicske, Austria-Hungary
- Died: 3 December 1983 (aged 80) Budapest, People's Republic of Hungary
- Party: MKP, MDP, MSZMP
- Profession: politician

Károly Kiss (24 September 1903 – 3 December 1983) was a Hungarian politician, who served as Minister of Foreign Affairs between 1951 and 1952. He was a member of the Communist Party of Hungary since 1922. He was imprisoned for nine years because of his illegal communist activities until 1944. After that he participated in the guerrilla movements against the fascist forces. After the ministership he served as Deputy Prime Minister from 1953.

Political offices
Preceded by Gyula Kállai	Minister of Foreign Affairs; 1951–1952	Succeeded by Erik Molnár
