= Rachel Oestreicher Bernheim =

American human rights activist

Rachel Bernheim (née Oestreicher; born May 15, 1943) is the chairwoman of The Raoul Wallenberg Committee of the United States, a human rights organization in New York.

== Biography ==
She was born on May 15, 1943, the daughter of Rachel Irvin Oestreicher of Salisbury, North Carolina, who owned Dave Oestreicher Inc., a department store in Salisbury.
