= Raoul Wallenberg International Movement for Humanity =

The Raoul Wallenberg International Movement for Humanity (RWIMH) is a non-profit organization dedicated to the education of the work of Raoul Wallenberg

Raoul Wallenberg [Paul Lancz, bronze (1996)]

and to the promotion of the moral principles that made it possible.

== Raoul Wallenberg ==
Raoul Wallenberg (August 4, 1912 – ?) was a hero of the Holocaust who saved 100,000 Jews in Budapest, Hungary from Nazi deportation.

== Creation of the RWIMH ==
Dr. Vera Parnes illegally founded the Raoul Wallenberg Society and created what she called the “Raoul Wallenberg Museum” in Moscow, USSR, housing a small collection of books, articles and artwork devoted to Wallenberg. The Society organized expositions at cultural events in Moscow and delivered lectures in schools. The Society appealed to Mikhail Gorbachev demanding any records regarding Wallenberg, but received no response. She finally published an open letter to Gorbachev in a news paper (Литературная Газета [Literary Gazette], September 5, 1990) imploring the Soviet leader to honour Wallenberg as an honorary citizen.

Following the 1991 coup against Gorbachev, Dr. Parnes left the USSR and eventually established The Raoul Wallenberg International Movement for Humanity in Montreal, Canada, on the occasion of what may have been Wallenberg's 80th birthday, to develop a stronger international organization aimed at promoting Wallenberg's achievement, and discovering the truth about his imprisonment.

== Work and Accomplishments ==
The mission of the RWIMH is to promote the memory and humanitarian principles of Wallenberg – his lessons, ideas, courage, and outstanding humanism – so that future generations may grow and improve in order to develop and enhance the values of enlightenment in the face of ideologies endangering our civilization. The Movement organises conferences exhibitions, media reports, lectures, commemorative ceremonies, and vigils to educate the public and to combat growing neo-Nazist Holocaust denial, ethnic tension, and discrimination guided by the example provided by Wallenberg.

Beginning in 1993, the RWIMH petitioned the government of Canada to honour Raoul Wallenberg. The Canadian Parliament declared January 17 Raoul Wallenberg Day in 2001, having received the support of, among others, Members of Parliament Clifford Lincoln, Irwin Cotler, and Sheila Copps, and Senator Sheila Finestone.

Some of the RWIMH's other work and accomplishments include: Raoul Wallenberg Square (and monument), Teaching Guide (available from the RWIMH website), “Search for the Truth” (an international conference investigating Wallenberg's imprisonment), annual conferences, meetings, and exhibitions, The Wallenberg Bulletin, RWIMH Certificate of Honour, Raoul Wallenberg Archives (compiled research pertaining to Wallenberg), and the planting of a grove in Jerusalem.

The RWIMH is currently preparing to honour Nobel Peace Prize Laureate Andrei Sakharov later this year, and to celebrate the 25th anniversary of the declaration of Canada's first honorary citizen, Raoul Wallenberg, next year.
