= Erik Molnár =

Hungarian politician (1894–1966)

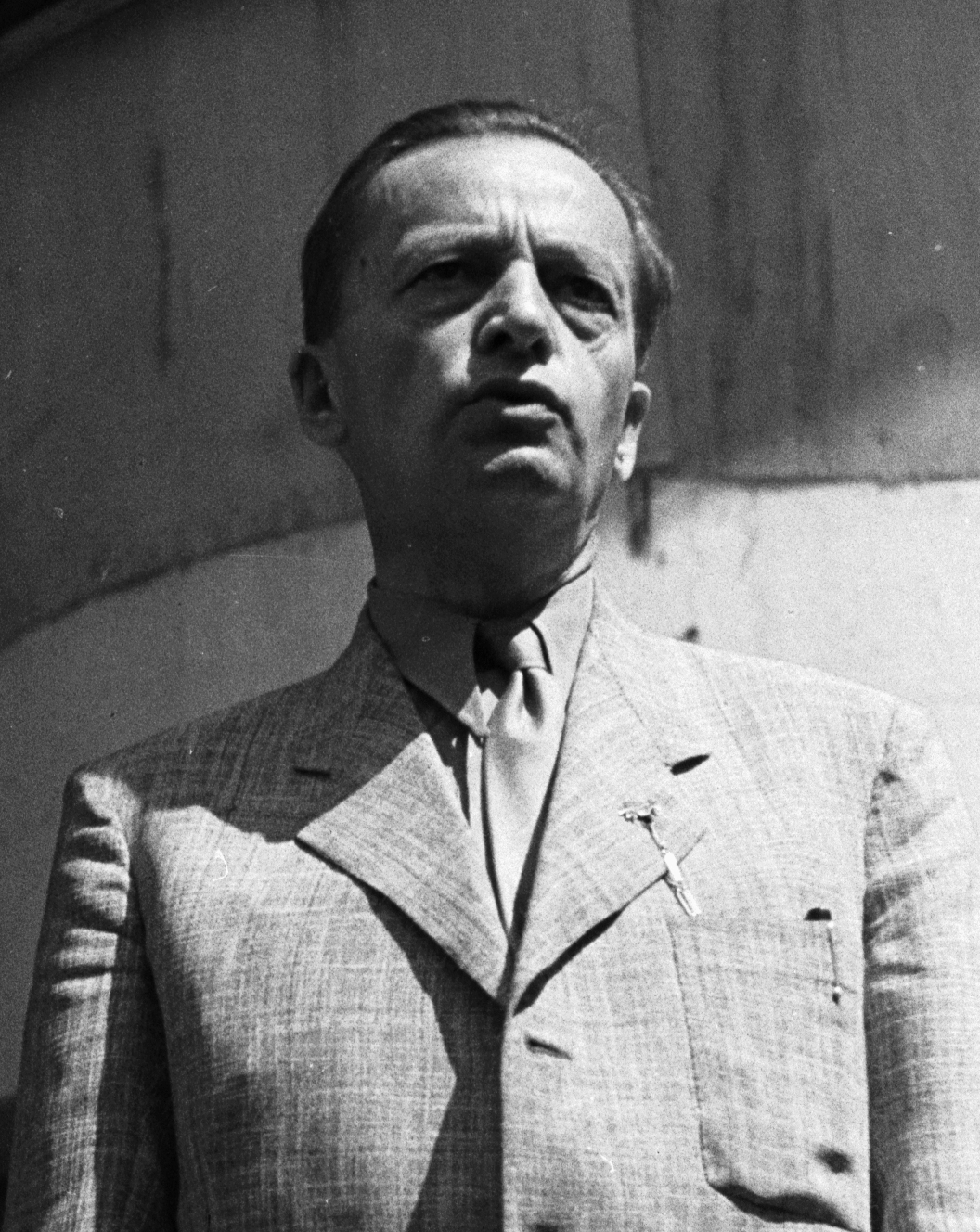

Minister of Foreign Affairs of Hungary
- In office 24 September 1947 – 5 August 1948
- Prime Minister: Lajos Dinnyés
- Preceded by: Ernő Mihályfi
- Succeeded by: László Rajk
- In office 14 November 1952 – 4 July 1953
- Prime Minister: Mátyás Rákosi
- Preceded by: Károly Kiss
- Succeeded by: János Boldóczki

Personal details
- Born: 16 December 1894 Újvidék (Novi Sad), Bács-Bodrog County, Austria-Hungary (today Serbia)
- Died: 8 August 1966 (aged 71) Budapest, People's Republic of Hungary
- Party: MKP, MDP, MSZMP
- Parent(s): Aladár Molnár; Jolán Jeszenszky
- Profession: politician, economist, historian

Erik Molnár (16 December 1894 – 8 August 1966) was a Hungarian communist politician, lawyer, economist and historian who served as Minister of Foreign Affairs twice: from 1947 to 1948 and from 1952 to 1953.

== Biography ==
During the First World War he fought at the Eastern Front and was captured by the Russians. As a prisoner of war, Molnár met with the communist ideas in a prisoner-of-war camp in Far East Asia. Later he returned home and finished his legal studies. After that, he joined the illegal Hungarian Communist Party and worked alongside his younger brother, René. He published a lot of articles for the illegal communist newspapers (Gondolat, Társadalmi Szemle, Korunk).

In the Interim National Government he served as Minister of Welfare (1944–1945). Later he was appointed Minister of Information and Minister of Foreign Affairs (1947–1948). Then he was the Hungarian ambassador to the Soviet Union (1948–1949), and later he worked as Minister of Justice (1950–1952). He was Minister of Foreign Affairs again between 1952 and 1953. He was the President of the Supreme Court of Hungary between 1953 and 1954, and was later appointed as Minister of Justice again (1954–1956).

He was a member of the assembly from 1944 until his death, and also a member of the communist party's Central Committee. Molnár played a big role in the management of the history research as member of the Hungarian Academy of Sciences's history institute and as chairman of the Hungarian Historical Society. He dealt with the problems of the Hungarian social development thoroughly, first of all with the land question. He applied Marxism-Leninism principles to Hungarian affairs. During the Second World War, bigger studies appeared about the Árpád era's society. After 1945, Molnár dealt with the Hungarian prehistory and the feudalism with the questions of age social history, the ideological antecedents of the historical materialism and with his philosophical basis problems, the questions of the contemporary capitalism, dealt with the development of the nationalism and its development furthermore.

== Publications ==
- Dialektika (Dialect), Budapest, 1941 (Erik Jeszenszky pseudonym).
- Magyar őstörténet (Hungarian prehistory), Budapest, 1942 (Lajos Szentmiklósy pseudonym).
- A feudalizmus kialakulása Magyarországon (The development of the feudalism in Hungary), Budapest, 1942 (Lajos Szentmiklósy pseudonym).
- Az Árpádkori társadalom 1. A gazdasági alap (The society of the Árpád Era I: The Economy), Budapest, 1943 (Lajos Szentmiklósy pseudonym).
- Az Árpádkori társadalom 2. A Felépítmény (The society of the Árpád Era II: The Forecastle), Budapest, 1943 (Lajos Szentmiklósy pseudonym).
- Dialektika (Dialect), Budapest, 1945.
- A magyar társadalom története az őskortól az Árpádkorig (The history of the Hungarian society from the Prehistory to the Árpád Era), Budapest, 1945.
- A magyar társadalom története az Árpádkortól Mohácsig (The history of the Hungarian society from the Árpád Era to the Battle of Mohács), Budapest, 1949.
- A történelmi materializmus ideológiai előzményei (The ideological antecedents of the historical materialism), Budapest, 1952.
- A magyar nép őstörténete (The prehistory of the Hungarian people), Budapest, 1953.
- A történelmi materializmus filozófiai alapproblémái (The philosophical basis problems of the historical materialism), Budapest, 1955.
- A jelenkori kapitalizmus néhány gazdasági problémája (Some economic problems of the contemporary capitalism), Budapest, 1959.
- Dialektikus materializmus és társadalomtudomány (Dialectic materialism and social science), Budapest, 1962.

Political offices
Preceded by Ernő Mihályfi	Minister of Foreign Affairs; 1947–1948	Succeeded by László Rajk
Preceded by István Ries	Minister of Justice; 1950–1952	Succeeded by Gyula Décsi
Preceded by Károly Kiss	Minister of Foreign Affairs; 1952–1953	Succeeded by János Boldóczki
Preceded by Ferenc Erdei	Minister of Justice; 1954–1956	Succeeded by Ferenc Nezvál
Legal offices
Preceded by Péter Jankó	President of the Supreme Court; 1953–1954	Succeeded by József Domokos
