= Ernő Mihályfi =

Hungarian politician

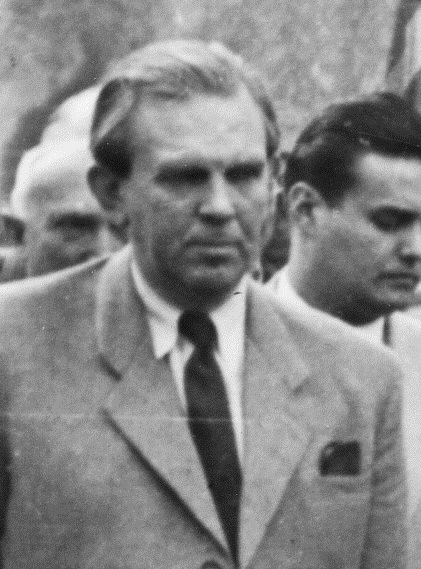

Minister of Foreign Affairs of Hungary
- In office 31 May 1947 – 24 September 1947
- Prime Minister: Mátyás Rákosi (acting); Lajos Dinnyés
- Preceded by: János Gyöngyösi
- Succeeded by: Erik Molnár

Personal details
- Born: 3 September 1898 Bér, Austria-Hungary
- Died: 20 November 1972 (aged 74) Budapest, People's Republic of Hungary
- Party: FKGP
- Spouse(s): Gabriella Tápay-Szabó; Ilona Fischer
- Parent: Sámuel Mihalovits
- Profession: politician

Ernő Mihályfi (3 September 1898 – 20 November 1972) was a Hungarian politician, who served as Minister of Foreign Affairs in 1947. He learned in the Budapest University of Technology and Economics then fought in the First World War. After the war, he worked as a journalist. Between 1923 and 1924, he worked and lived in the United States. Mihályfi was member of the Independent Smallholders, Agrarian Workers and Civic Party. He also served as Minister of Information and later as Deputy Speaker of the National Assembly. He was member of the parliament until his death.

Political offices
Preceded by János Gyöngyösi	Minister of Foreign Affairs; Acting; 1947	Succeeded by Erik Molnár
