= János Gyöngyösi =

Hungarian politician (1893–1951)

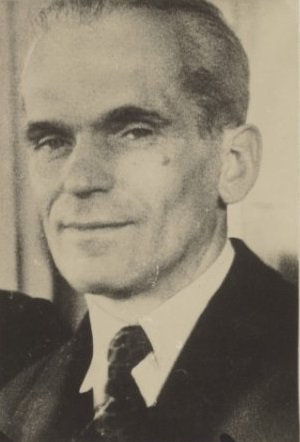
- Gyöngyösi in 1945

Minister of Foreign Affairs of Hungary
- In office 22 December 1944 (officially 28 March 1945) – 31 May 1947
- Prime Minister: Béla Miklós; Zoltán Tildy; Mátyás Rákosi; Ferenc Nagy
- Preceded by: Gábor Kemény
- Succeeded by: Ernő Mihályfi

Personal details
- Born: 3 May 1893 Berki, Sáros County, Kingdom of Hungary, Austria-Hungary
- Died: 29 October 1951 (aged 58) Budapest, Hungarian People's Republic
- Party: FKGP
- Parent(s): Ferenc Heller; Etelka Szányi
- Profession: politician diplomat

János Gyöngyösi (born János Heller; 3 May 1893 – 29 October 1951) was a Hungarian politician, who served as Minister of Foreign Affairs between 1944 and 1947.

== Biography ==
Born 3 May 1893, in Berki, he fought in World War I. After the war, he worked as a journalist and finished his studies in the Budapest University (now Eötvös Loránd University). During the Second World War he was a reserve officer in Debrecen, near the Hungarian-Romanian border.

In 1931, Gyöngyösi joined the Smallholders Party. From 1944, he supported the Allies and the Red Army in his articles and called on the Hungarian home defence soldiers to capitulate. He became Minister of Foreign Affairs in the illegitimate Interim National Government. He could be minister because he was in good terms with leading politicians of the Soviet Union. However, Gyöngyösi realised the superpower's real intentions that helping Hungary may not be their best interests at heart. That's why he switched to strengthening ties with the Western powers (US, UK). In 1947, Gyöngyösi signed the Treaty of Paris. As a result, Hungary again lost large parts of its territory, for example Northern-Transylvania. Gyöngyösi's political career was doomed when Ferenc Nagy had to resign.

Political offices
Preceded by Gábor Kemény	Minister of Foreign Affairs; 1944–1947	Succeeded by Ernő Mihályfi
