= Guy von Dardel =

Swedish physicist (1919–2009)

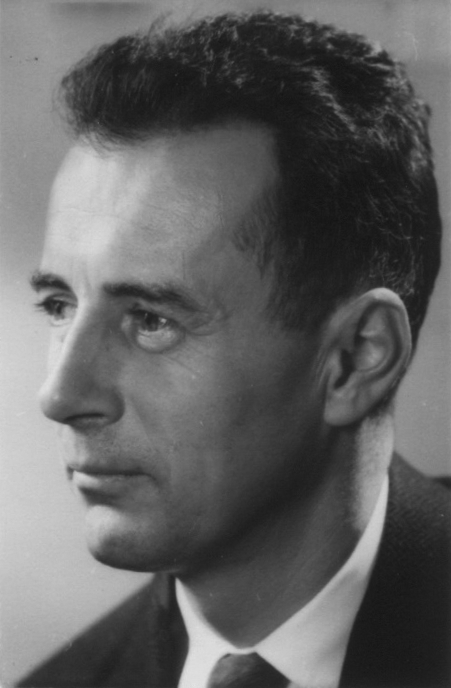
- Dardel in April 1955
- Born: Guy Fredrik von Dardel; 26 August 1919
- Died: 29 August 2009 (aged 90); Geneva, Switzerland
- Education: Royal Institute of Technology
- Occupation: Physicist
- Employers: Saab; Swedish National Defence Research Institute; CERN; Lund University
- Known for: Investigation into fate of his half-brother Raoul Wallenberg
- Parent(s): Fredrik Elias August von Dardel; Maria Sofia "Maj" Wising
- Relatives: Raoul Wallenberg (maternal half-brother); Nina Lagergren (sister); Nils Dardel (uncle)
- Awards: Elected a member Royal Swedish Academy of Sciences

Guy Fredrik von Dardel (26 August 1919 – 28 August 2009) was a Swedish physicist who researched particle physics and participated in the establishment of CERN.

== Biography ==
Dardel was the son of Fredrik Elias August von Dardel by his marriage to Maria Sofia "Maj" Wising. His half-brother, from his mother's previous marriage, was Raoul Wallenberg. His sister was Nina Lagergren (née von Dardel). His niece Nane Lagergren, Nina's eldest daughter, was married to Kofi Annan.

Guy von Dardel studied at the Royal Institute of Technology in Stockholm. He graduated in 1944, received his licentiate in 1951 and his doctorate in 1953 with a thesis titled The Interaction of Neutrons with Matter studied with a Pulsed Neutron Source. He was an employee of SAAB from 1944 to 1946, the Swedish National Defence Research Institute (FOA) from 1946 to 1950, and the semi-governmental nuclear energy company AB Atomenergi from 1950 to 1954.

In 1954, Dardel became involved in the establishment of CERN, where he was active as a researcher. In 1964 he accepted a position at Lund University and was appointed professor of elementary particle physics there the following year. He also chaired the European Committee for Future Accelerators. As a physicist, he is mostly known for his research work in collaboration with the Nobel laureate Burton Richter.

He died in August 2009, at his home in Geneva after an illness at the age of 90.

== Awards ==
Guy von Dardel was elected a member of the Royal Swedish Academy of Sciences in 1975. His niece, Nane Lagergren, married Kofi Annan in 1984.

== Inquires into the fate of Raoul Wallenberg ==
Guy von Dardel was active in searching for and establishing the fate of his half-brother, Raoul Wallenberg, who was apprehended by Soviet troops in Hungary towards the end of the Second World War and subsequently disappeared. Dardel was a member of several international commissions which inquired into the matter, including the Swedish government's Wallenberg committee (Wallenbergutredningen) which presented its report in 2001, after ten years of work. He was an honorary chairman of The Raoul Wallenberg Committee of the United States.

In 2013, von Dardel received in absentia the Dr. Rainer Hildebrandt Human Rights Award endowed by Alexandra Hildebrandt. The award is given annually in recognition of extraordinary, non-violent commitment to human rights.
