= Gábor Kemény (politician, 1910–1946) =

Hungarian politician

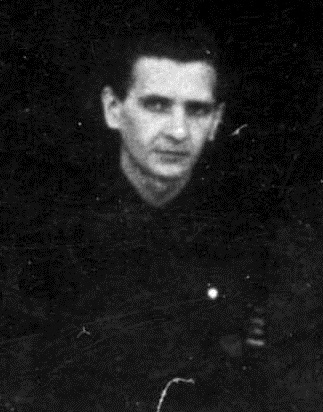

Minister of Foreign Affairs of Hungary
- In office 16 October 1944 – 27 March 1945
- Prime Minister: Ferenc Szálasi
- Preceded by: Gusztáv Hennyey
- Succeeded by: János Gyöngyösi

Personal details
- Born: 14 December 1910 Budapest, Austria-Hungary
- Died: 19 March 1946 (aged 35) Budapest, Second Hungarian Republic
- Cause of death: Execution by hanging
- Party: Arrow Cross Party
- Profession: politician

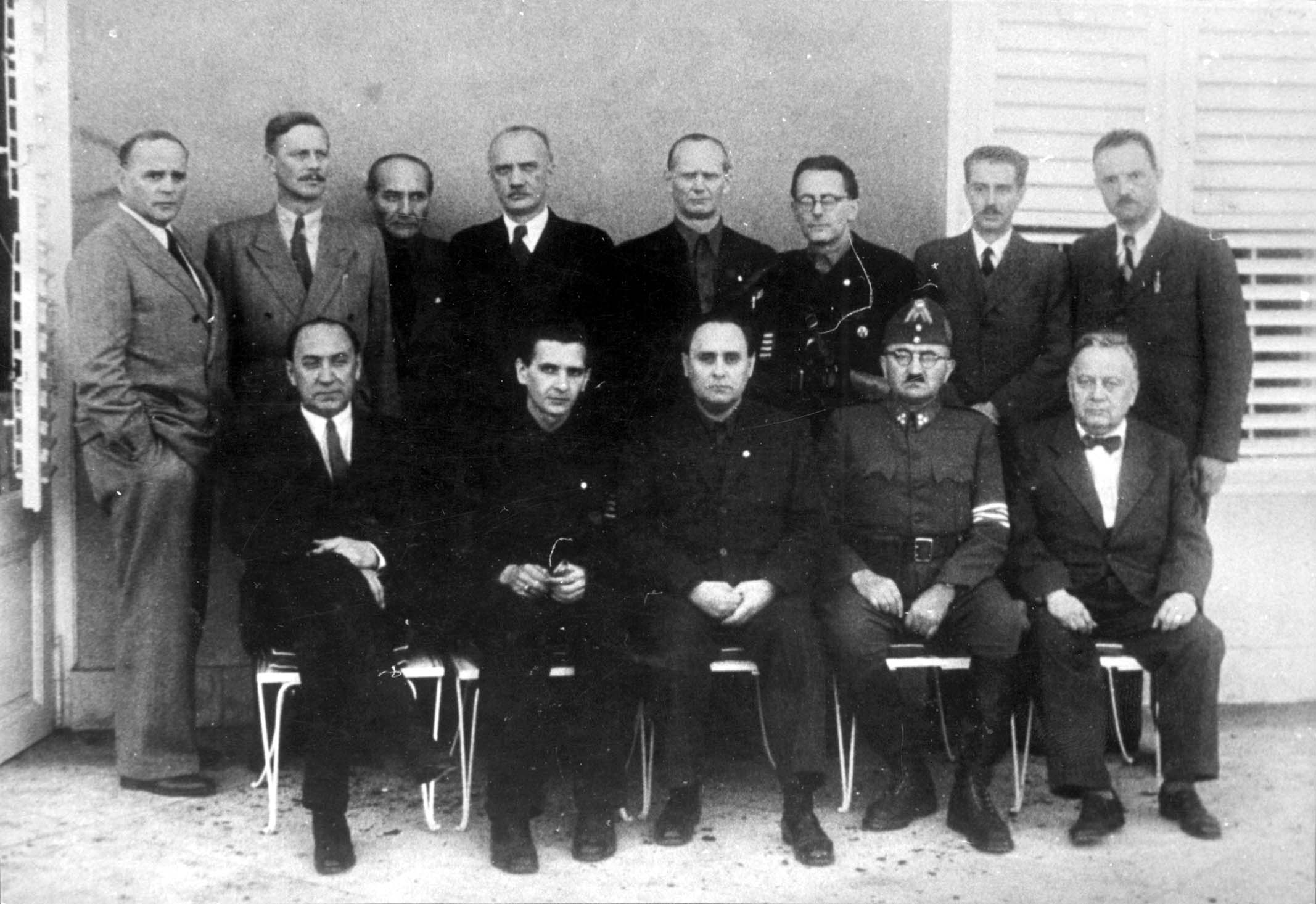
Ministers of the Arrow Cross Party government. Gábor Kemény is in the second from left of the lower row.

Baron Gábor Kemény (14 December 1910 – 19 March 1946) was a Hungarian politician, who served as Minister of Foreign Affairs in the Government of National Unity led by Szálasi between 1944 and 1945. He prevented the diplomatic protests against the terror. After the fall of Budapest, he tried to escape into Western Europe, but the arriving American troops captured him with other members of the Arrow Cross Party's government. He was tried by the People's Tribunal in Budapest in open sessions and sentenced to death for war crimes and high treason. Kemény was hanged in 1946 in Budapest. He was the youngest member of that Government.

Political offices
Preceded by Gusztáv Hennyey	Minister of Foreign Affairs; 1944–1945	Succeeded by János Gyöngyösi
