= János Boldóczki =

Hungarian politician (1912–1988)

Minister of Foreign Affairs of Hungary
- In office 4 July 1953 – 30 July 1956
- Prime Minister: Imre Nagy; András Hegedüs
- Preceded by: Erik Molnár
- Succeeded by: Imre Horváth

Personal details
- Born: 22 August 1912 Tótkomlós, Austria-Hungary
- Died: 23 December 1988 (aged 76) Budapest, People's Republic of Hungary
- Party: MKP, MDP, MSZMP
- Profession: politician

János Boldóczki (according to other sources János Boldoczki; 22 August 1912 – 23 December 1988) was a Hungarian politician, who served as Minister of Foreign Affairs between 1953 and 1956. He was member of the Hungarian Communist Party since 1944. From 1950 he was the Hungarian ambassador to Czechoslovakia and from 1956 to the Soviet Union. He kept his position during the Hungarian Revolution of 1956. After that Boldóczki served as ambassador to Mongolia.

Political offices
Preceded by Erik Molnár	Minister of Foreign Affairs; 1953–1956	Succeeded by Imre Horváth
