= Nina Lagergren =

Swedish businesswoman (1921–2019)

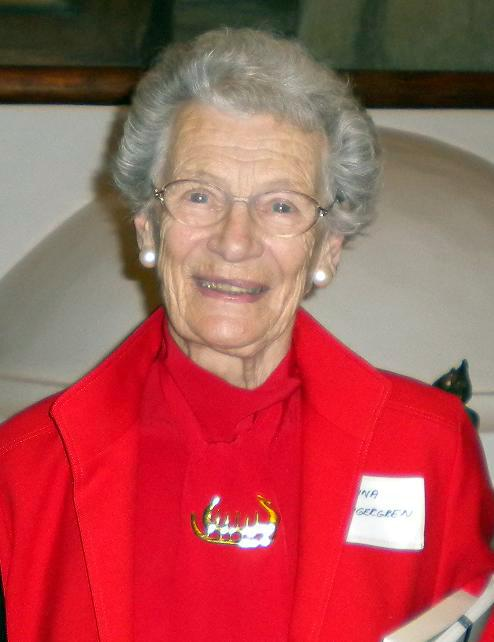
- Lagergren in 2009
- Born: Nina Viveka Maria von Dardel; 3 March 1921; Stockholm, Sweden
- Died: 5 April 2019 (aged 98); Djursholm, Sweden
- Spouse: Gunnar Lagergren (m. 1943; died 2008)
- Children: 4 (including Nane Lagergren Annan)
- Parent(s): Fredrik Elias August von Dardel; Maria Sofia "Maj" Wising
- Relatives: Raoul Wallenberg (maternal half-brother); Guy von Dardel (brother); Kofi Annan (son-in-law); Nils Dardel (uncle)

Nina Viveka Maria Lagergren (née von Dardel; 3 March 1921 – 5 April 2019) was a Swedish businesswoman and the half-sister of Raoul Wallenberg, and a leading force to find out what happened to him after his disappearance. She was the founder of the Raoul Wallenberg Academy. She also presented Sommar i P1 in 2014 on Swedish Radio. She was the mother-in-law of Kofi Annan.

== Work ==
Nina Lagergren was the founder of the Raoul Wallenberg Academy, which she ran along with her parents Fredrik Elias August von Dardel and Maria Sofia "Maj" Wising and her brother Guy von Dardel. In 2000, Lagergren was awarded the Wallenberg Medal, which was presented to her by the University of Michigan.

Lagergren was the presenter of an episode of Sommar i P1 at Sveriges Radio on 4 August 2014 where she told about her life and her work to find out what had happened to her half-brother.

On 8 March 1945, Soviet-controlled Hungarian radio announced that Wallenberg and his driver had been murdered on their way to Debrecen, suggesting that they had been killed by the Arrow Cross Party or the Gestapo. Sweden's foreign minister, Östen Undén, and its envoy to the Soviet Union, Staffan Söderblom, wrongly assumed that they were dead. In April 1945, W. Averell Harriman, then of the US State Department, offered the Swedish government help in inquiring about Wallenberg's fate, but the offer was declined. Söderblom met with Vyacheslav Molotov and Stalin in Moscow on 15 June 1946. Söderblom, still believing Wallenberg to be dead, ignored talk of an exchange for Russian defectors in Sweden. In 1991, Vyacheslav Nikonov was charged by the Russian government with investigating Wallenberg's fate. He concluded that Wallenberg died in 1947, executed while a prisoner in Lubyanka. He may have been a victim of the C-2 poison (carbylamine-choline-chloride) tested at the poison laboratory of the Soviet secret services.

Some former prisoners claimed to have seen Wallenberg after his reported death in 1947. In February 1949, former German Colonel Theodor von Dufving, a prisoner of war, provided statements concerning Wallenberg. While in the transit camp in Kirov, while being moved to Vorkuta, Dufving encountered a prisoner dressed in civilian clothes with his own special guard. The prisoner claimed that he was a Swedish diplomat and said he was there "through a great error". Lagergren continued to work with this information throughout her life, searching for details about his fate. In October 2016, Wallenberg was declared dead by Sweden's Tax Agency.

== Personal life ==
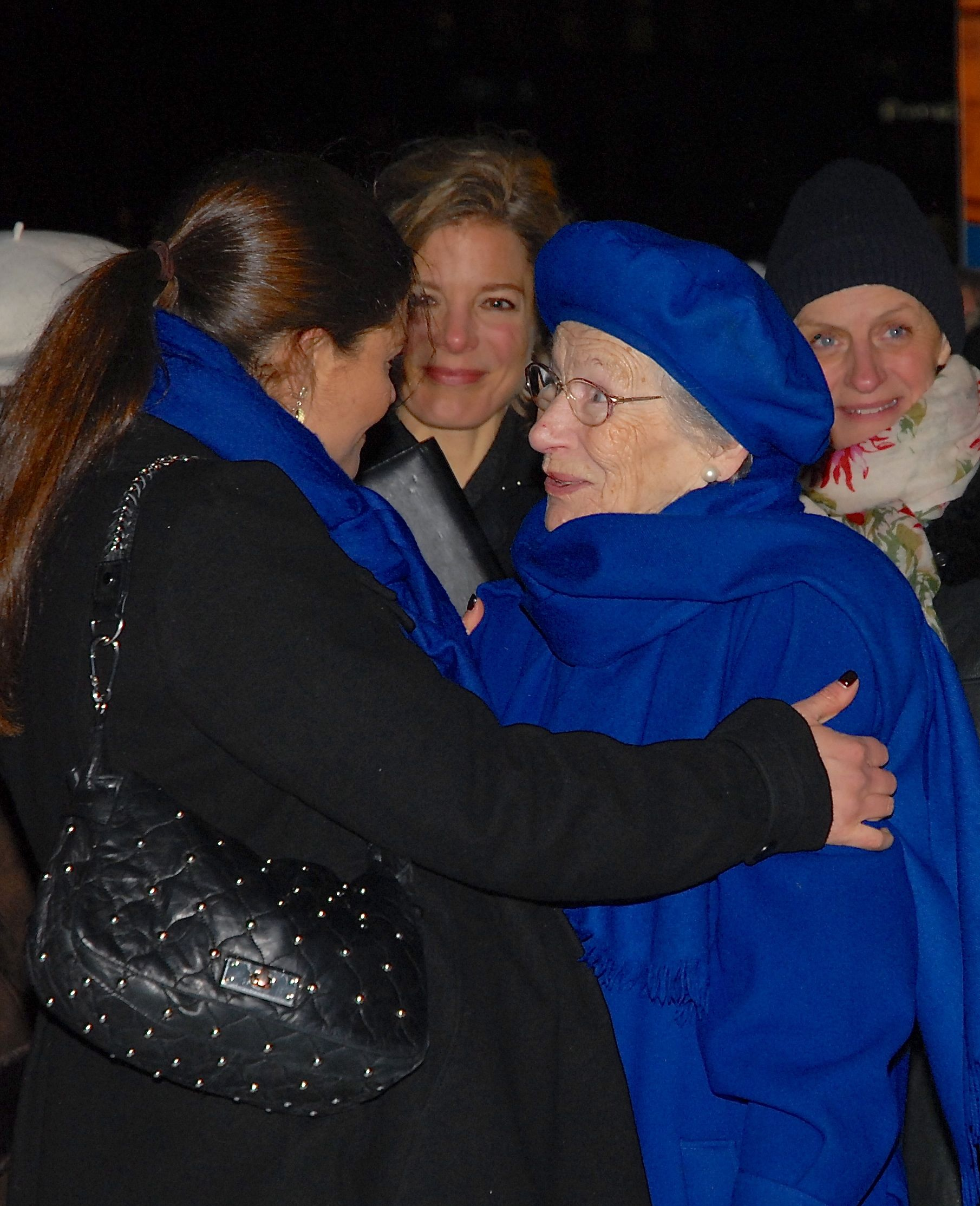
Crown Princess Victoria and Nina Lagergren on 27 January 2012 at a commemoration ceremony for the Holocaust and the 100th birthday of Raoul Wallenberg

She was married to judge and marshal Gunnar Lagergren from 1943 until his death in 2008, and the couple had four children together. Lagergren was the mother-in-law of Kofi Annan, the former Secretary-General of the UN, who was married to her eldest daughter Nane Lagergren Annan. Lagergren was also the niece of painter Nils Dardel. She was part of the opening of the exhibition of his art work at Moderna Museet in Stockholm in 2014.

Lagergren died on 5 April 2019 at the age of 98.
