= Second Hungarian Republic =

Hungarian state from 1946 to 1949

Hungarian Republic Magyar Köztársaság (Hungarian)
- 1946–1949
- Flag Coat of arms
- Anthem: "Himnusz" (Hungarian) (English: "Hymn")
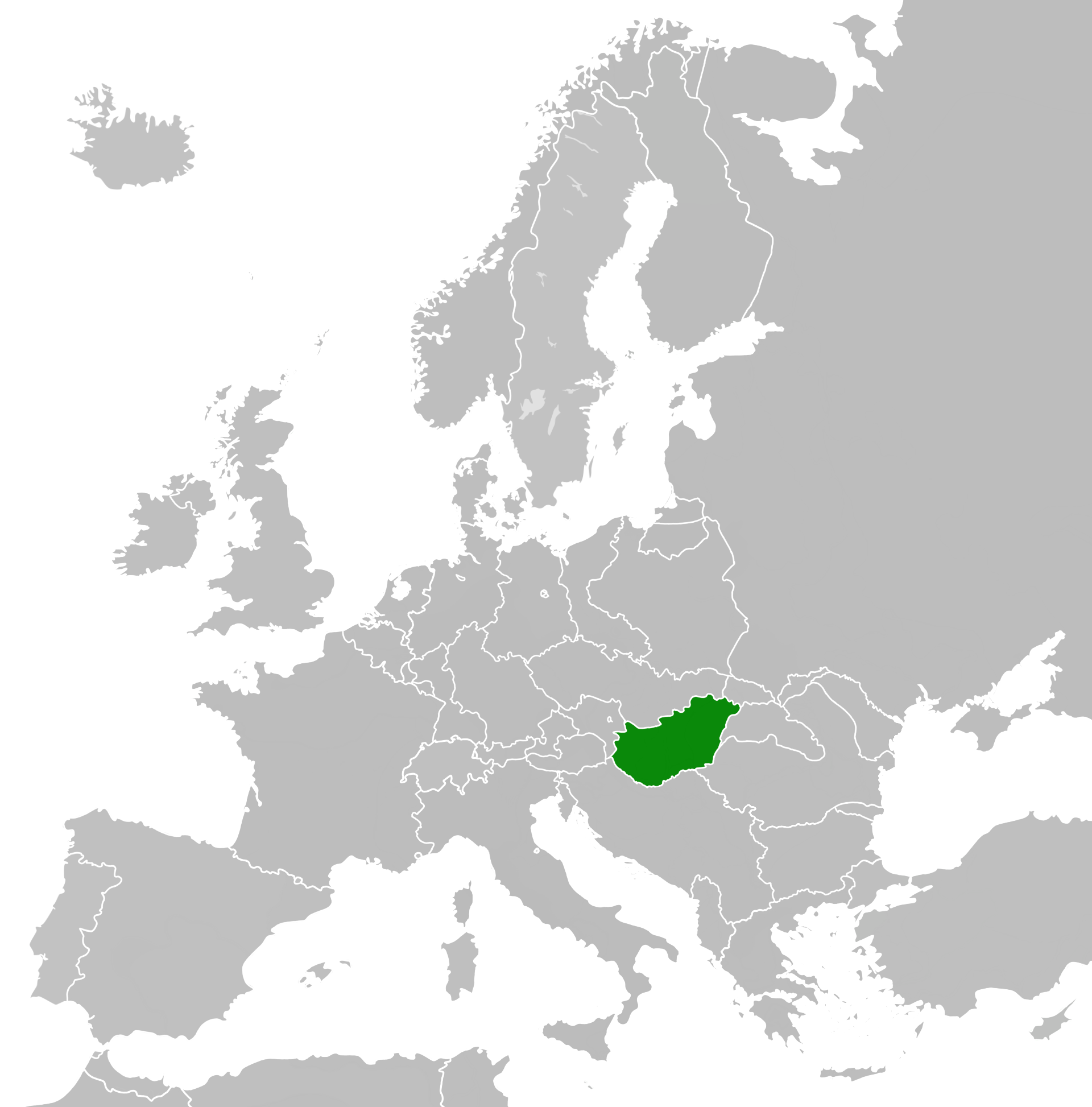
- Capital and largest city: Budapest
- Official languages: Hungarian
- Religion: Christianity (majority) (Note: Predominantly Roman Catholic.); Judaism (minority)
- Demonym: Hungarian
- Government: Unitary parliamentary republic (Note: From 1947 until the proclamation of the Hungarian People's Republic, Hungary was dominated by the Hungarian Communist Party.)
- De facto leader
  - 1946–1949: Mátyás Rákosi
- President
  - 1946–1948: Zoltán Tildy
  - 1948–1949: Árpád Szakasits
- Prime Minister
  - 1946–1947: Ferenc Nagy
  - 1947–1948: Lajos Dinnyés
  - 1948–1949: István Dobi
- Legislature: National Assembly
- Historical era: Cold War
  - Monarchy abolished: 1 February 1946
  - Paris Peace Treaty: 10 February 1947
  - Communist coup: 31 May 1947
  - Blue-ballot elections: 31 August 1947
  - People's Republic: 20 August 1949

Area
- 1946: 93,073 km^{2} (35,936 sq mi)
- 1947: 93,011 km^{2} (35,912 sq mi)
- 1949: 93,011 km^{2} (35,912 sq mi)

Population
  - 1949: 9,204,799
- Currency: Pengő / Adópengő (Note: Until 1 August 1946.); Forint
Preceded by
Kingdom of Hungary
Succeeded by
Hungarian People's Republic
Democratic Federal Yugoslavia
Third Czechoslovak Republic
- Today part of: Hungary; Slovakia (Note: Bratislava bridgehead until 10 February 1947.)

The Second Hungarian Republic (Note: Hungarian: Második Magyar Köztársaság [ˈmaːʃodik ˈmɒɟɒr ˈkøstaːrʃɒʃaːɡ]) was the Hungarian state that existed as a parliamentary republic briefly established after the disestablishment of the Kingdom of Hungary on 1 February 1946. It was itself dissolved on 20 August 1949 and succeeded by the Soviet-backed Hungarian People's Republic.

The Republic was proclaimed in the aftermath of the Soviet occupation of Hungary at the end of World War II in Europe and with the formal abolition of the Hungarian monarchy, whose throne had been vacant since 1918, (Note: Miklós Horthy de Nagybánya had ruled as Regent since 1920 until he was captured by Edmund Veesenmayer and deposed on 15 October 1944.) in February 1946. Initially the period was characterized by an uneasy coalition government between pro-democracy elements—primarily the Independent Smallholders' Party—and the Hungarian Communist Party. At Soviet insistence, the Communists had received key posts in the new cabinet, particularly the Interior Ministry, despite the Smallholders' Party's landslide victory in the 1945 elections. From that position the Communists were able to systematically eliminate their opponents segment by segment through political intrigue and fabricated conspiracy, a process that Communist leader Mátyás Rákosi called "salami tactics".

By June 1947 the Communist Party had gutted the Smallholders' Party as a political force through the mass arrests and forced exile of its main leaders and had gained effective control of the government. New elections in August 1947 substantially increased the Communists' share of the vote, though the elections were marred with fraud and intimidation. Regardless, further Communist plans managed to liquidate most of the remaining opposition parties within the next year. By October 1947, the Communists had dropped all pretense of pluralism, forcing their nominal coalition partners to cooperate with them or be exiled. This culminated in June 1948, when they forced the Social Democratic Party of Hungary to merge with then to form the Hungarian Working People's Party, essentially a renamed and enlarged Communist Party. They subsequently installed a Communist as president and a fellow traveller as prime minister. The government instituted programs of nationalization of key industries as part of the Sovietization of the Hungarian economy and society as the country entered the Soviet sphere of influence. In August 1949, the country was formally proclaimed to be a people's republic with the Communists as the sole legal party. This arrangement would last, aside from a brief break in 1956, until the end of Communism in Hungary in 1989–90.

== History ==
=== Beginnings ===
From September 1944 until April 1945, as World War II in Europe drew to a close, the Red Army occupied Hungary. The Siege of Budapest lasted almost two months and much of the city was destroyed. Neither the Western Allies nor the Soviet Union supported any changes to Hungary's pre-1938 borders, so the peace treaty signed by Hungary in 1947 declared that "The decisions of the Vienna Award of 2 November 1938 are declared null and void". This meant that Hungary's borders were moved back to those that existed on 1 January 1938 and it lost the territories it had regained between 1938 and 1941. The Soviet Union also annexed Trans-Carpathia, some of which had been part of Hungary before 1938.

The Soviets set up an alternative government in Debrecen on 21 December 1944 before capturing Budapest between 18 January and 13 February, 1945. Zoltán Tildy became the provisional prime minister. The Soviet government would demand the return of all materials taken from the USSR, as well as reparations of 300 million USD in commodities to Moscow, 200 million to Czechoslovakia and 100 million to Romania.

=== Hyperinflation ===
The combination of high demand for finance to pay war reparations with a very weak system of tax collection meant that during 1945 and 1946, the national currency, the pengő, would be destroyed by the most ruinous hyperinflation in recorded history. The hyperinflation was largely due to the inability of tax revenues to pay the country’s war debts, but some historians argue it was a deliberate policy of the Soviet Union to destroy Hungary’s middle class. The only way to restore sanity to the economy was a new currency, so the forint was introduced in 1946.

=== German deportation ===
Between 1946 and 1948, half of Hungary's ethnic German minority (around 250,000 people) were deported to Germany and there was a forced "exchange of population" between Hungary and Czechoslovakia.

=== Soviet control ===
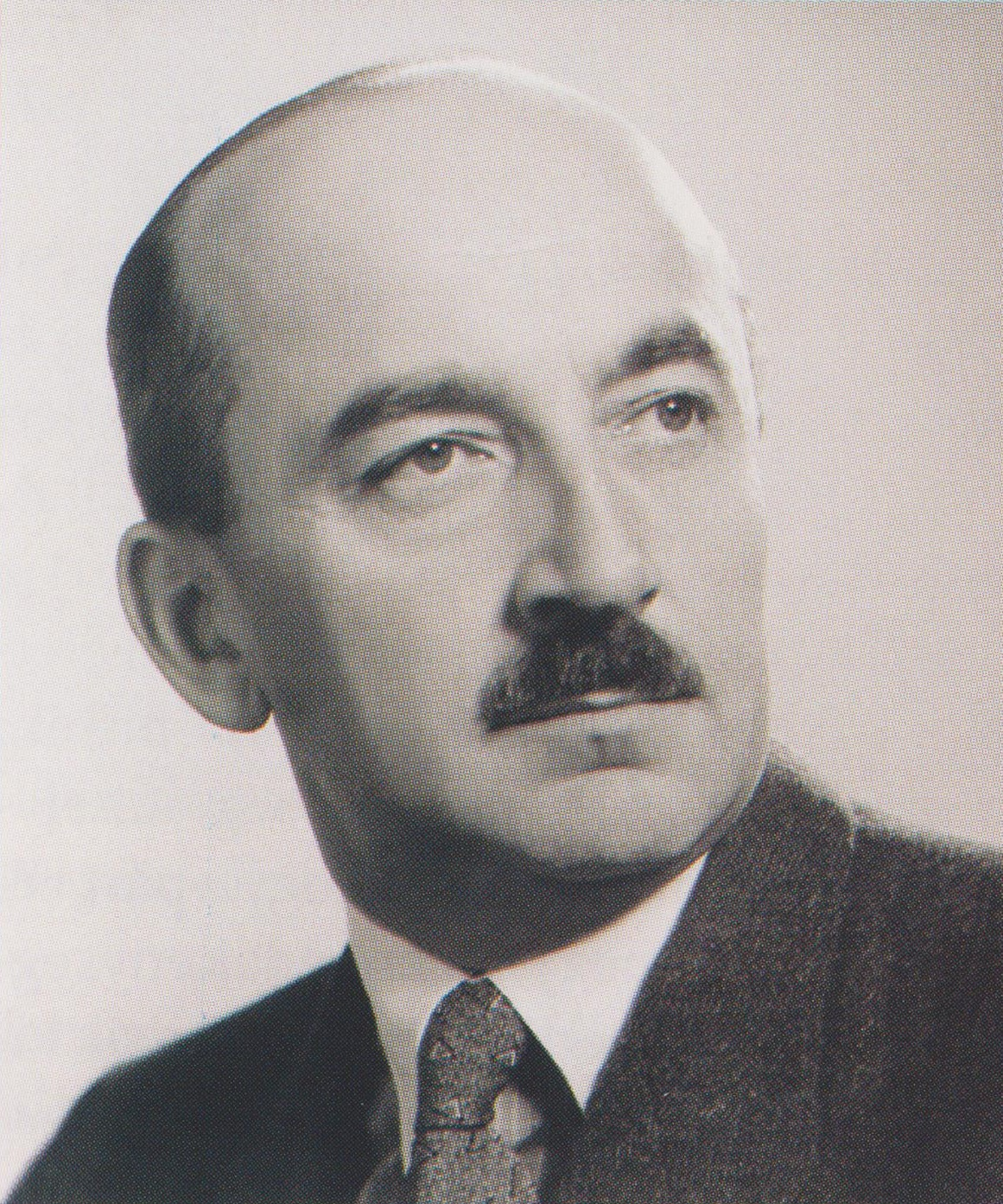
Ferenc Nagy

In elections held in November 1945, the Independent Smallholders' Party won 57% of the vote. The Hungarian Communist Party, now under the leadership of Mátyás Rákosi and Ernő Gerő, two veterans from the Hungarian Soviet Republic of 1919, won 17% of the vote making them the largest opposition party. The Soviet commander in Hungary, Marshal Kliment Voroshilov, refused to allow the Smallholders Party to form a government. Instead Voroshilov established a coalition government with the communists holding some of the key posts. Under Parliament, the leader of the Smallholders, Zoltán Tildy, was named president and Ferenc Nagy prime minister in February 1946. Mátyás Rákosi became deputy prime minister.

László Rajk became minister of the interior and in this post established the security police (ÁVO). In February 1947 the police began arresting leaders of the Smallholders Party and the National Peasant Party. It also pressured both parties to expel those members who weren't willing to support the Communist's Program as "fascists." Several prominent figures in both parties escaped abroad. Later, Rákosi boasted that he had dealt with his partners in the government, one by one, "cutting them off like slices of salami."

By 1947, the power of the other parties in the coalition had been reduced in favour of the Communists, and they became the largest party in elections held that year with 22% of the vote. The Communists were the dominant partners in the coalition People's Independence Front government. Nagy was replaced as prime minister by the more pliable Lajos Dinnyés.

In October 1947, Rákosi gave the leaders of the non-Communist parties an ultimatum: cooperate with a new, Communist-dominated coalition government or go into exile. The Social Democratic Party effectively ceased to exist as an independent organization, and Independent Smallholders' Party secretary Béla Kovács was arrested and sent to Siberia. Other opposition leaders such as Anna Kéthly, Ferenc Nagy and István Szabó were imprisoned or sent into exile.

In 1948, the Social Democrats were forced to merge with the Communists to form the Hungarian Working People's Party (MDP). Some Social Democrats split from the new party however and tried to operate independently however would be suppressed. In August, Tildy was forced out as president in favour of the formerly Social Democrat Árpád Szakasits. That December, Dinnyés was replaced as leader of the Smallholders and as prime minister by the Communist sympathist István Dobi. At the 1949 elections, voters were presented with a single list from the Communist-controlled Independent People's Front, which carried 95 percent of the vote. By this time, sympathists had taken over the other parties and turned them into loyal partners of the Communists.

On 18 August 1949, the Parliament passed Hungary's first written constitution (1949/XX.) which bore similarity to the 1936 constitution of the Soviet Union. The formal name of the country became the People's Republic of Hungary, a "country of workers and working peasants" where "every authority is vested in the working people". The building of socialism was declared as one of the main goal of the nation. A new coat of arms was adopted with Communist symbols, such as the red star, a hammer, and an ear of wheat.

1948 Second Hungarian Republic issued passport.

== See also ==
- History of Hungary
