= 1944 Hungarian parliamentary election =

- November 1944–June 1945

All 498 elected seats in the Diet 250 seats needed for a majority
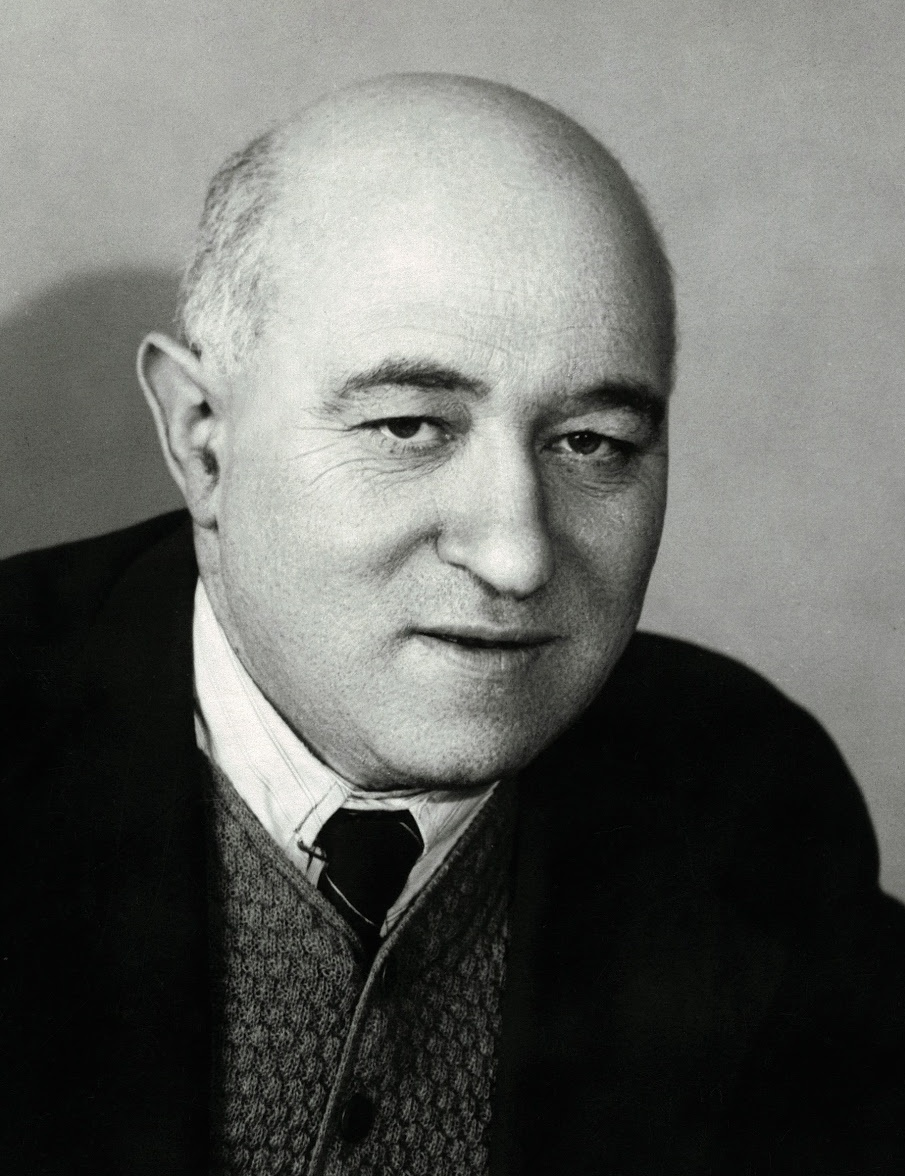

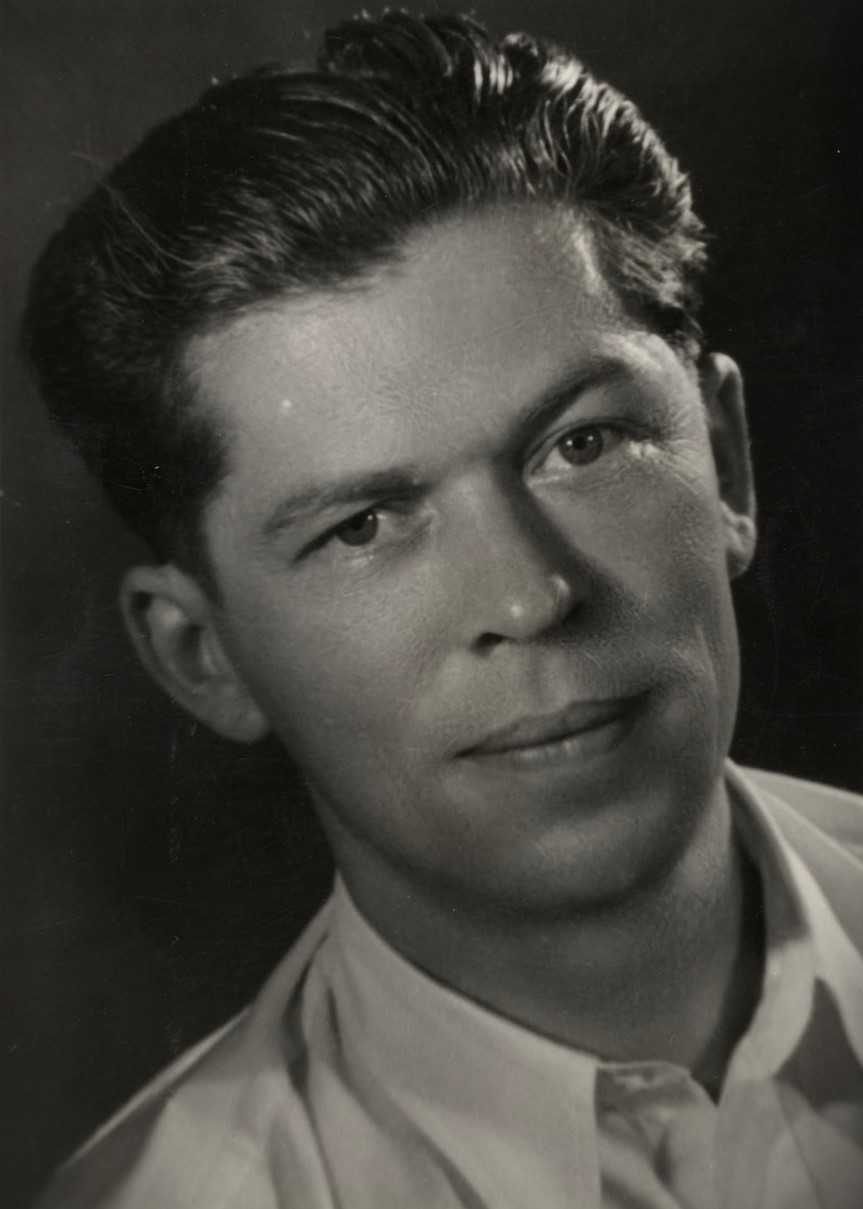

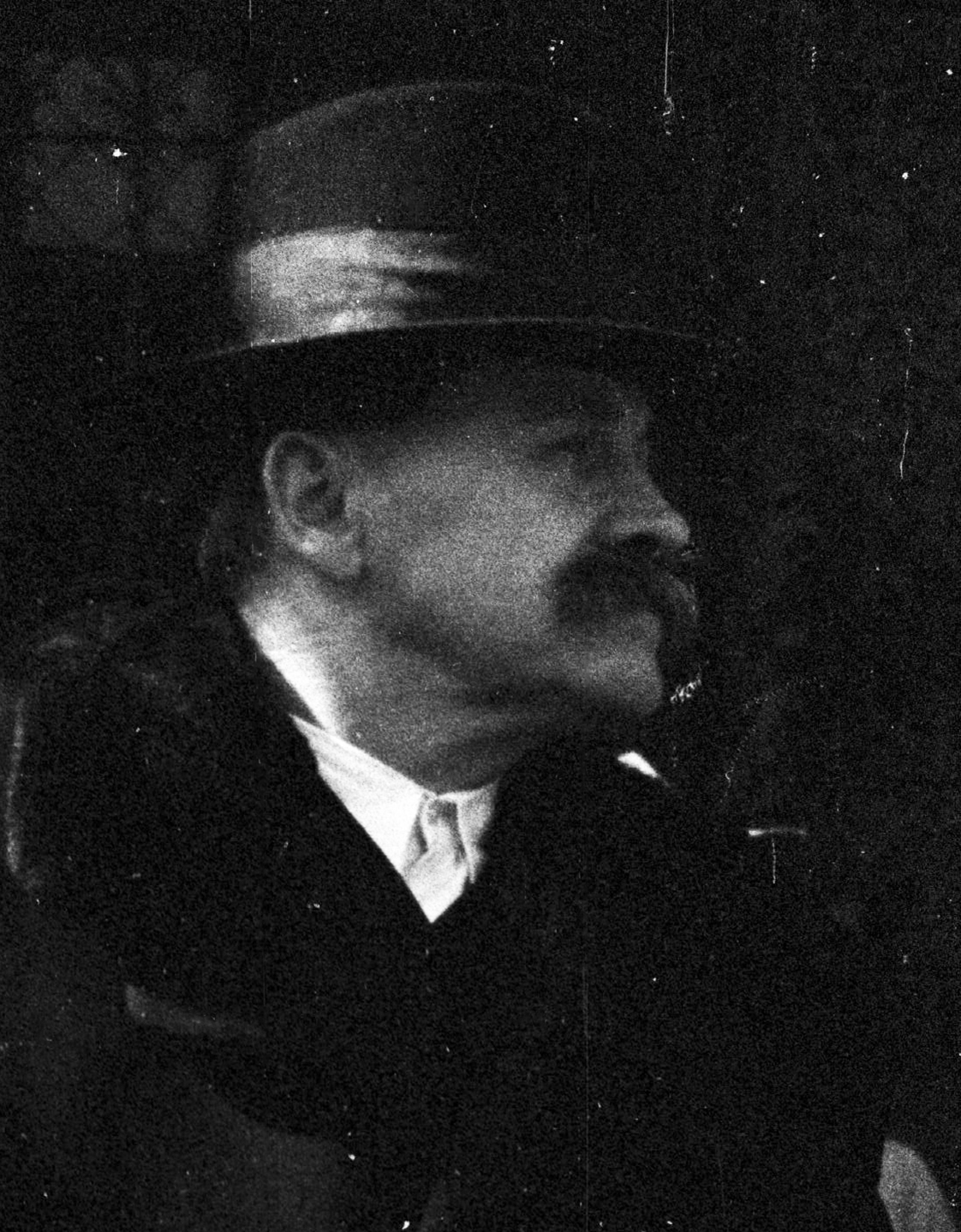
	First party	Second party
Leader	Mátyás Rákosi	György Marosán
Party	MKP	MSZDP
Alliance	BB	BB
Seats won	166 / 498	125 / 498
Percentage	33.33%	25.10%
	Third party	Fourth party
Leader	István Balogh	Péter Veres
Party	FKgP	NPP
Alliance	BB	BB
Seats won	124 / 498	42 / 498
Percentage	24.90%	8.43%
Prime Minister before election
Ferenc Szálasi
NYKP
Prime Minister after election
Béla Miklós
Military

Elections for the National Interim Assembly were held in Hungary in November 1944. Members were elected at public meetings held in 45 cities and towns in areas under the control of the Red Army. An additional 160 members were elected in liberated areas on 2 April and 24 June 1945.

The Hungarian Communist Party won 89 of the 230 seats, increasing to 166 of the 498 seats after the 1945 elections. The Assembly first convened in Debrecen on 21 and 22 December 1944, establishing a new government and declaring war on Nazi Germany. Its second session was held in Budapest in September 1945, establishing fresh elections and passing legislation on land redistribution.

== Results ==
Party	Seats			
Party	Nov 1944	Apr 1945	Jun 1945	Total
Hungarian Communist Party	89	36	41	166
Social Democratic Party of Hungary	42	38	45	125
Independent Smallholders Party	57	16	51	124
National Peasant Party	16	6	20	42
Civic Democratic Party	12	6	3	21
Independents	14	6	0	20
Total	230	108	160	498
Source: Nohlen & Stöver

== The activity of the parliament ==
The Interim National Assembly declared itself as the exclusive representative of sovereignty, and transferred the powers of the head of state to the High National Council, which was composed of the Prime Minister, the Speaker of the House and a delegate from the Political Committee of the National Assembly. The rules of the parliamentary elections were amended: single-member districts were abolished, the national list was introduced and the multi-member constituencies were extended to the entire country. Members of organizations and parties classified as fascist, (including the Hungarian Life Party, which was in government until 1944), were excluded from the electors.
