= Independent Hungarian Democratic Party =

Independent Hungarian Democratic Party Független Magyar Demokrata Párt
- First leader: István Balogh
- Last leader: Gyula Kovár
- Founded: 20 July 1947 (1st); 5 May 1989 (2nd)
- Dissolved: 1949 (officially existed) (1st); 28 January 2011 (2nd)
- Split from: Independent Smallholders' Party
- Newspaper: Magyar Nemzet; Magyar Vasárnap
- Youth wing: Independent Hungarian Youth
- Ideology: Liberalism
- Political position: Centre

The Independent Hungarian Democratic Party (Hungarian: Független Magyar Demokrata Párt, FMDP) was a political party in Hungary in the period after World War II. The party was revived after the end of communism in 1989–90, but remained unsuccessful.

== History ==
The party was founded on 20 July 1947, shortly before the election that year. Its leader was István Balogh, a Roman Catholic cleric, who, prior that, resigned as Secretary-General of the Independent Smallholders, Agrarian Workers and Civic Party (FKGP) and quit the party along with his supporters (e.g. journalist György Parragi) on 3 July 1947. The Communists led by Mátyás Rákosi allowed for FMDP to contest the 1947 election for the purpose of weakening the FKGP, Balogh and Rákosi had several meetings on that subject. Ex-National Peasant Party (NPP) politician Imre Kovács also joined the FMDP on 15 August 1947. In the 1947 parliamentary election, held on 31 August, the FMDP won 18 of the 411 seats in Parliament.

The FMDP focused on the interests of urban middle class and intellectuals in Budapest, it barely had rural party organizations and branches. The party's short-lived youth wing was the Independent Hungarian Youth, led by Sándor Győriványi. The party supported the creation of bourgeois democracy while opposed the Soviet-type economic model, according to its programme. Despite this, the FMDP was the only opposition party which voted in favor of the Communists' three-year plan, nevertheless it rejected the nationalization of banks. Balogh's party found itself in a political vacuum, as the Left Bloc considered it as a rival in acquisition of laborers' votes, while the anti-Communist Hungarian Independence Party (MFP) and Democratic People's Party (DNP) refused to cooperate with Balogh due to his collaborative relationship with the Hungarian Communist Party (MKP) and its leader Rákosi. After the election, the MKP and the Hungarian Social Democratic Party (MSZDP) prevented that the FMDP merged into the FKGP. Its relation with the Roman Catholic Church in Hungary also became frosty, because the FMDP did not speak out against the nationalization of parochial schools.

Prior to the 1949 elections the FMDP was forced to join the Communist-led Hungarian Independent People's Front (MFNF). The Front ran a single list chosen by the Hungarian Working People's Party (MDP), with FMDP members winning 10 seats. Following the elections the party ceased to function, although was not officially dissolved. István Balogh resigned from his parliamentary seat on 8 June 1951.

== Re-establishment ==
The FMDP was revived in Budapest on 5 May 1989, after the end of communism in 1989–90, but remained an unsuccessful extra-parliamentary organization. During its first congress, István Neff, godson of the late Balogh, was elected leader of the party. In May 1990, he was replaced by journalist and sports official Gyula Kovár. The FMDP did not participate in the Hungarian Round Table Talks, it became only an observer at the National Round Table Talks after 10 June 1989. The party, along with the Transylvanian Alliance, the National Alliance of Hungarian Political Prisoners (Pofosz) and the re-founded MFP, protested against this decision by sending a joint petition to Speaker Mátyás Szűrös, ineffectively. On 22 November 1989, the FMDP, alongside independent MPs and other re-established "historic" parties, expressed its support to the reform-Communist government of Miklós Németh and did not support the dissolution of the parliament.

On 8 December 1989, the FMDP, maintaining its independence, joined the National Alliance of Centre Parties (CPNSZ) to contest in coordination with the other participating parties (MFP, MRP and SZDP) in the 1990 parliamentary election. The FMDP received 0.06 percent of the regional votes, gaining no seats. In May 1993, MP Imre Kőrösi, who was expelled from the Hungarian Democratic Forum (MDF), joined the FMDP, providing parliamentary representation for his new party. With Kőrösi's role as deputy leader, the FMDP became more active, however despite this, it received only 0.04 percent of the votes in the 1994 parliamentary election. After the failure, Kőrösi left the party.

Before the 1998 parliamentary election, the FMDP joined the alliance Union for Hungary (EMU), Kovár also appeared in the alliance's national list. The EMU gained 0.19 percent of the votes. In the 2002 parliamentary election, the FMDP only had one candidate in Budapest who obtained 531 votes. The party did not participate in the next two elections, as a result it was dissolved on 28 January 2011.

== Election results ==
Election	Votes	%	Seats	+/–	Status
1947	262,109	5.25% (#7)	18 / 411	–	Opposition
1949	Part of the MNFF		10 / 402	▼8	Government
1990	2,954	0.06%	0 / 386	–	Extra-parliamentary
1994	2,366	0.04%	0 / 386	0	Extra-parliamentary
1998	Part of Union for Hungary		0 / 386	0	Extra-parliamentary
2002	531	0.01%	0 / 386	0	Extra-parliamentary

== Sources ==
- Vida, István (2011). Magyarországi politikai pártok lexikona (1846–2010) [Encyclopedia of the Political Parties in Hungary (1846–2010)] (in Hungarian). Gondolat Kiadó. ISBN 978-963-693-276-3.
