= Placid Olofsson =

Placid Olofsson Dr OSB
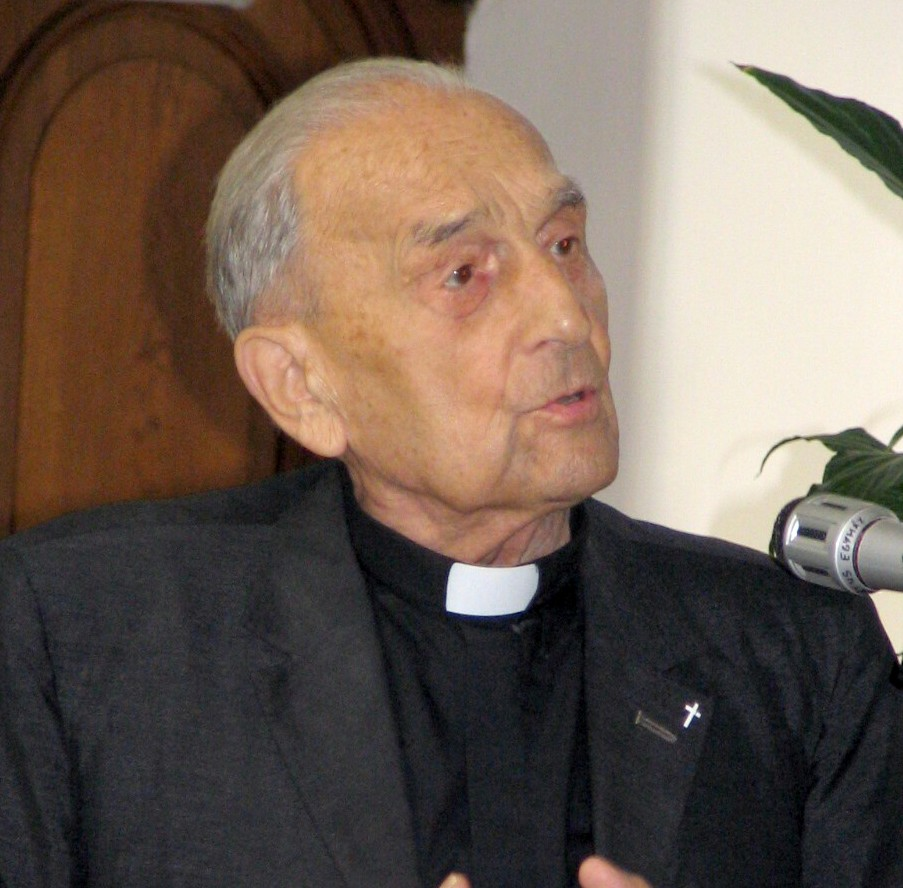
- Olofsson in 2004
- Native name: Károly Olofsson
- Church: Roman Catholic Church

Orders
- Ordination: 18 June 1939 by Stefano Breyer
- Rank: Priest

Personal details
- Born: 23 December 1916 Rákosszentmihály, Hungary
- Died: 15 January 2017 (aged 100) Budapest, Hungary
- Denomination: Roman Catholic
- Residence: Budapest, Hungary
- Parents: Gusztáv Olofsson; Jusztina Reihardt
- Occupation: Teacher; Priest; Monk
- Education: Szent Benedek Benedictine Secondary School; Pannonhalma Abbey; Ludwig-Maximilians-Universität München; University of Budapest
- Motto: "Lighten me up, Holy Spirit, to do everything for the salvation of people. If I am looking for myself, humble me, but if I promise you, bless me and help me very much."

Dr OSB Placid Olofsson (born as Károly Olofsson; 23 December 1916 – 15 January 2017) was a Hungarian Benedictine monk, priest, teacher and Gulag victim.

In 1946, he was interned in the Soviet Union in a Gulag labour camp on the basis of fake charges, where he spent ten years. He found there his new vocation: to keep the other prisoners in countenance. After his return to Hungary with his teachings, lectures and books, he gave faith and hope for life to thousands of people.

"I have repeatedly said: note, the Lord has humor! For ten years the Soviet Union has done everything to ruin me. I'm still here with my 91 years, but where is the Soviet Union?"

— Placid Olofsson

== Life ==
=== Early years ===
On his father's side he was of Swedish descent, on his mother's side of Danube Swabian. His father, Gusztáv Olofsson, was a professor of descriptive geometry at the Technical University of Budapest and later high school teacher in Budapest, who converted from Lutheranism to Roman Catholicism. His mother was Jusztina Reihardt. He had only one sister, Jusztina who became a nun in Pressbaum, Austria.

After completing the four years of elementary school, his father enrolled him in the Szent Benedek Benedictine Secondary School. His head teacher was the famous Benedictine monk Ferenc Xavér Szunyogh. During his high school years, the spirit of the school and scouting greatly influenced him. In 1933, he took part on the 4th World Scout Jamboree in Gödöllő, Hungary.

=== Studies ===
As a teenager Olofsson did not want to become a monk. His role models were his teachers at school, whom he looked up to. But over time he realised that he should join monasticism, so he applied to the Pannonhalma Archabbey. His noviciate started on 6 August 1933. He enrolled in the University of Budapest and besides theology studied Germanistics, Hungarian studies and humanities. He also received a doctorate.

In 1935, Olofsson studied at the Ludwig-Maximilians-Universität München for two semesters.

He was ordained on 18 June 1939 and took the monk name Placid after Saint Placidus, a disciple of Saint Benedict on Monte Cassino. His motto became:

Lighten me up, Holy Spirit, to do everything for the salvation of people. If I am looking for myself, humble me, but if I promise you, bless me and help me very much.

— Placid Olofsson

=== Second World War ===
Olofsson worked as a chaplain for a year in Győr, but shortly afterwards became a priest in the army because the Second World War broke out. He gave the injured people spiritual support in the field hospital of Komárom. One time during his time preaching in the church he sharply criticized the officer corps with examples he heard from the injured. As a consequence of that he was brought before the military court and was officially decommissioned.

Then Olofsson became a teacher in Sopron where, besides teaching humanities, he held worldview lectures on Capitalism, Socialism, Fascism, Nationalsocialism, and Christianity, until the occupation by Germany. Then he was relocated to Budapest where he also worked as a teacher until the end of the war.

=== Soviet occupation ===
In 1945, Jusztinián György Serédi named him as the cardinal advisor of Margit Slachta's Sisters of Social Service. So he candidated at the first free election after the end of the German occupation on the party list of the Independent Smallholders, Agrarian Workers and Civic Party under Slachta's political party, the Christian Women's League. He campaigned hard for the organisation. The election was a great success for the conservatives. After winning one seat, Olofsson passed it on to another candidate of the Christian Women's League. After the Soviet occupation of Hungary the majority of the media came under Soviet control. Articles appeared in the news criticizing Placid Olofsson and his activity.
