= Left Bloc (Hungary) =

Political alliance in Hungary

Left Bloc Baloldali Blokk
- Leader: Mátyás Rákosi
- Founder: Mátyás Rákosi; Árpád Szakasits; Péter Veres
- Founded: 5 March 1946
- Dissolved: 31 August 1947
- Succeeded by: Patriotic People's Front
- Ideology: Communism; Marxism–Leninism; Stalinism
- Political position: Far-left
- Members: MKP MSZDP NPP
- Colors: Red (primarily)
- Seats in the National Assembly (1946): 162 / 421
- Seats in the National Assembly (1947): 203 / 411

The Left Bloc (in Hungarian: Baloldali Blokk) was a political alliance in Hungary, functioning between 1946 and 1947. The Bloc included the Hungarian Communist Party (MKP), the Social Democratic Party (SZDP), the National Peasant Party (NPP) and the Trade Union Council (SZT).

== Origin ==
The Left Bloc was primarily formed to counteract the Independent Smallholders' Party, which had won a majority of the vote in the 1945 Hungarian parliamentary election. Despite the Smallholders' victory, the Soviet occupiers had forced them to include the Communists, Social Democrats, and National Peasants in a grand coalition. The Communist Party was given control over the crucial Ministry of Interior—in charge of public security—while Communist leader Mátyás Rákosi became Deputy Prime Minister. The official justification for the Bloc's formation was to defend the country's "progressive achievements" thus far, primarily the land reform enacted in March 1945. The Smallholders' Party wished to revise some of the excesses committed in the process, in which many peasant smallholdings had also been divided up, but the Communists accused them of wishing to reverse the entire process.

== Dividing the opposition ==
The Left Bloc was founded in Budapest on March 5, 1946. It was effectively a coalition within a coalition, taking the opposite position to the majority Smallholders' Party on every issue in order to isolate them and create political deadlock. The Bloc's primary demands were the exclusion of "reactionaries" from the government and the nationalization of the banks, mines, and heavy industry, and the three parties organized street demonstrations to force their agenda. The Bloc's demands received tacit backing from the Soviet occupiers. Amidst the country's dire economic situation, political deadlock, and Soviet threats, the Smallholders' Party backed down in most cases. For instance, they agreed to expel 20 "reactionaries" from the Smallholders' parliamentary group on March 12, diminishing their majority. The expelled deputies went on to found the Hungarian Freedom Party, becoming the most outspoken anti-Communist force over the next year. The Left Bloc also blocked the holding of municipal elections, which the Smallholders' Party was expected to sweep. Thus, the Communists kept their disproportionate influence amongst the country's local authorities, which had been appointed with Red Army backing.

From December 1946, a massive conspiracy uncovered by the Communists led to the arrest of many of Smallholders' Party members, ultimately depriving the party of its elected majority. In the process, the Soviet occupiers arrested Béla Kovács, the General Secretary of the Smallholders' Party on February 25, 1947. This process culminated in May 1947 when the elected Prime Minister Ferenc Nagy was forced to resign and go into exile. The Communists now held effective power, and thus pressured President Zoltán Tildy to dissolve Parliament and hold early elections. The Smallholders' Party was now decimated, with many of its key personalities either in jail or exile. The Communists also amended the electoral law to exclude some 466,000 voters from the rolls—effectively destroying the Hungarian Freedom Party—while allowing for the registration of many more parties than in 1945 to split the anti-Communist vote. On July 30, the three parties of the Left Bloc issued a joint statement, but ended up running separately.

== Dissolution ==
In the elections that August, the Left Bloc parties ended up winning less than half of the vote. The non-Left Bloc parties won over 2.5 million votes, roughly what the Smallholders' Party itself had won in 1945. But the Communists emerged as the largest single party, and set about eliminating the others with political pressure. The liquidation of the Hungarian Independence Party in November gave the left-wing parties a majority overall. This was followed by the full merger of the Communist and Social Democratic Parties in June 1948 to form the Hungarian Working People's Party.

The Left Bloc was officially dissolved after the 1947 elections, having played a crucial role in Rákosi's "salami tactics" to gradually eliminate the opponents of the Communist Party.

== Member parties ==
| Party | Emblem | Leader | Ideology | National Assembly (1946) | National Assembly (1947) |
|---|---|---|---|---|---|
| Hungarian Communist Party Magyar Kommunista Párt (MKP) | | Mátyás Rákosi | Communism Marxism-Leninism Stalinism | 70 / 421 | 100 / 411 |
| Hungarian Social Democratic Party Magyaroszági Szociádemokrata Párt (MSzDP) | | Árpád Szakasits | Social democracy Democratic socialism | 69 / 421 | 67 / 411 |
| National Peasant Party Nemzeti Parasztpárt (NPP) | | Péter Veres | Agrarian socialism Left-wing populism | 23 / 421 | 36 / 411 |

== Election results ==
| Election date | Popular vote | % | Number of seats | Alliance |
|---|---|---|---|---|
| 1947 | 2,266,581 | 45.39% | 203 / 411 | FKGP–MKP–MSZDP–NPP |
