= Hungarian Freedom Party =

Hungarian Freedom Party Magyar Szabadság Párt
- Leader: Dezső Sulyok
- Deputy Leader: Vince Nagy
- Founded: 15 March 1946 (1st); 1 November 1956 (2nd); 12 July 1989 (3rd)
- Dissolved: 21 July 1947 (1st); 4 November 1956 (2nd); 9 March 1999 (3rd)
- Split from: Independent Smallholders' Party (FKGP)
- Succeeded by: Hungarian Independence Party
- Newspaper: A Holnap; Magyar Holnap
- Ideology: National conservatism Anti-communism
- Political position: Right-wing
- Most MPs: 21 / 420 (June 1947)

The Hungarian Freedom Party (Hungarian: Magyar Szabadság Párt; or simply Freedom Party), was a short-lived right-wing political party in Hungary between 1946 and 1947, it strongly opposed the Communist takeover. The party was revived for a short time during the Hungarian Revolution of 1956 and after the end of communism in 1989–90.

== History ==
Despite the fact that the Independent Smallholders' Party (FKGP) won a sweeping victory in the November 1945 parliamentary election, the party was forced to enter a coalition with the left-wing parties, including Mátyás Rákosi's Hungarian Communist Party (MKP), which was the only kind of government acceptable to the Soviet-dominated Allied Control Commission (SZEB) led by Marshal Klement Voroshilov. The FKGP's gains were gradually whittled away by the Communist Rákosi's salami tactics. At first the right-wing branch of the FKGP became the first victims of the Communist pressure. Dezső Sulyok and his supporters were forced out of their party on 10 March 1946. Fifteen expelled party members founded a new party called the Hungarian Freedom Party on 15 March 1946. The Allied Control Commission has taken note and allowed the foundation on 24 July 1946.

Dezső Sulyok was elected leader of the Freedom Party, Bela Halter as Secretary General, while Vince Nagy and István Vásáry became deputy leaders. Several prominent politicians, such as Dezső Pattantyús-Ábrahám and Győző Drozdy also joined the party. Sulyok presented the party’s programme on 24 July. The cornerstones of the programme were maintaining neutrality and independence of Hungary, and ensuring the democratic rights and principles of parties. There was increased friction between the Freedom Party and Smallholders' Party as the latter was increasingly becoming controlled by the Communists, who accused the Freedom Party with "fascist and reactionary", however Sulyok's group distanced themselves from the previous Horthy era and the Arrow Cross Party government, in addition to strong opposition to the proletarian dictatorship.

The Hungarian Freedom Party became the most diligent opponent to the Soviet influence, trying to shed light on the antidemocratic actions of the Communist Party. In the summer of 1947, in the presence of Soviet arms, Hungary prepared for a new election. Upon the result of the peer pressure of the pro-Soviet Left Bloc parties, the parliament made further steps away from the Western democracies and towards a Soviet-type system that elections were held. They took place on the basis of a new electoral law (called "Lex Sulyok"), which excluded about 466,000 people (almost a tenth of the electorate) from the vote on grounds of membership in the "pre-war fascist parties". Thus Dezső Sulyok and most of the Freedom Party leadership, who formerly members of the governing national conservatist Unity Party then Party of National Unity, which parties claimed by the Communists as "fascist and reactionary"), were unable to participate in the 1947 parliamentary election. Protesting against the new election law, the Freedom Party dissolved itself on 21 July 1947. Several leading members, including Sulyok, Halter and Nagy fled the country and emigrated, while others retired from the politics or joined other parties, such as Hungarian Independence Party (MFP) and Independent Hungarian Democratic Party (FMDP).

== Short-lived refoundations ==
During the Hungarian Revolution of 1956, which has enabled a temporary multi-party system, Dezső Pattantyús-Ábrahám initiated the refoundation of the Hungarian Freedom Party on 1 November 1956. József Vásáry, Béla Haray, Imre Miklós and György Kálmán Szilviusz also involved in the party. Its programme emphasized Hungary's neutrality and non-alignment. Following the Soviet invasion on 4 November, the party ceased to function.

The party revived again during the transitional process to democracy under the name Freedom Party (SZP) by members of the right-wing Hungarian emigration group in the United States. The initiative came into existence in New Brunswick, New Jersey on 18 May 1989 and established as a party on 12 July 1989 in Hungary. The SZP ruled that former members of the Hungarian Socialist Workers' Party (MSZMP) were excluded from joining the party. After an interim presidency of physician Gyula Gueth, the first congress of the party elected the Hungarian-American Ernő Hóka as leader of the SZP. 1956 revolutionist and freedom fighter Ödön Pongrátz also joined the party. The party headquarters were in New York City and Kaposvár. The SZP accepted a strong anti-communist programme and demanded the immediate resignation of the reformist communist Miklós Németh cabinet. The party marginalized due internal conflicts by end of 1989, thus its application for admission to the Hungarian Round Table Talks was refused.

The Freedom Party could run only five individual candidates in the 1990 parliamentary election and set up two regional county lists (Somogy and Zala). The SZP received 0.06 percent of the votes and gained no seats. The SZP split into two factions under the leaderships of Gyula Gueth and Ferenc Torda on 15 August 1992, when the latter one founded a new organization called Hungarian Freedom Party. The SZP made a short-lived electoral alliance with the József Torgyán-led Independent Smallholders' Party on 28 November 1992, but soon it left the alliance because they were not given guaranteed seats on the FKGP's national list for the 1994 parliamentary election. The SZP did not contest neither in 1994 nor 1998, it became technically defunct by March 1999, when the Somogy County Court abolished the organization.

== Election results ==
=== National Assembly ===
Election year	National Assembly				Government
Election year	# of overall votes	% of overall vote	# of overall seats won	+/–	Government
1990	2,814	0.06%	0 / 386		extra-parliamentary

== Sources ==
- Vida, István (2011). Magyarországi politikai pártok lexikona (1846–2010) [Encyclopedia of the Political Parties in Hungary (1846–2010)] (in Hungarian). Gondolat Kiadó. ISBN 978-963-693-276-3.
