= 1947 Hungarian parliamentary election =

- 31 August 1947

All 411 seats in the National Assembly 206 seats needed for a majority
- Turnout: 92.3% (▼0.2 pp)
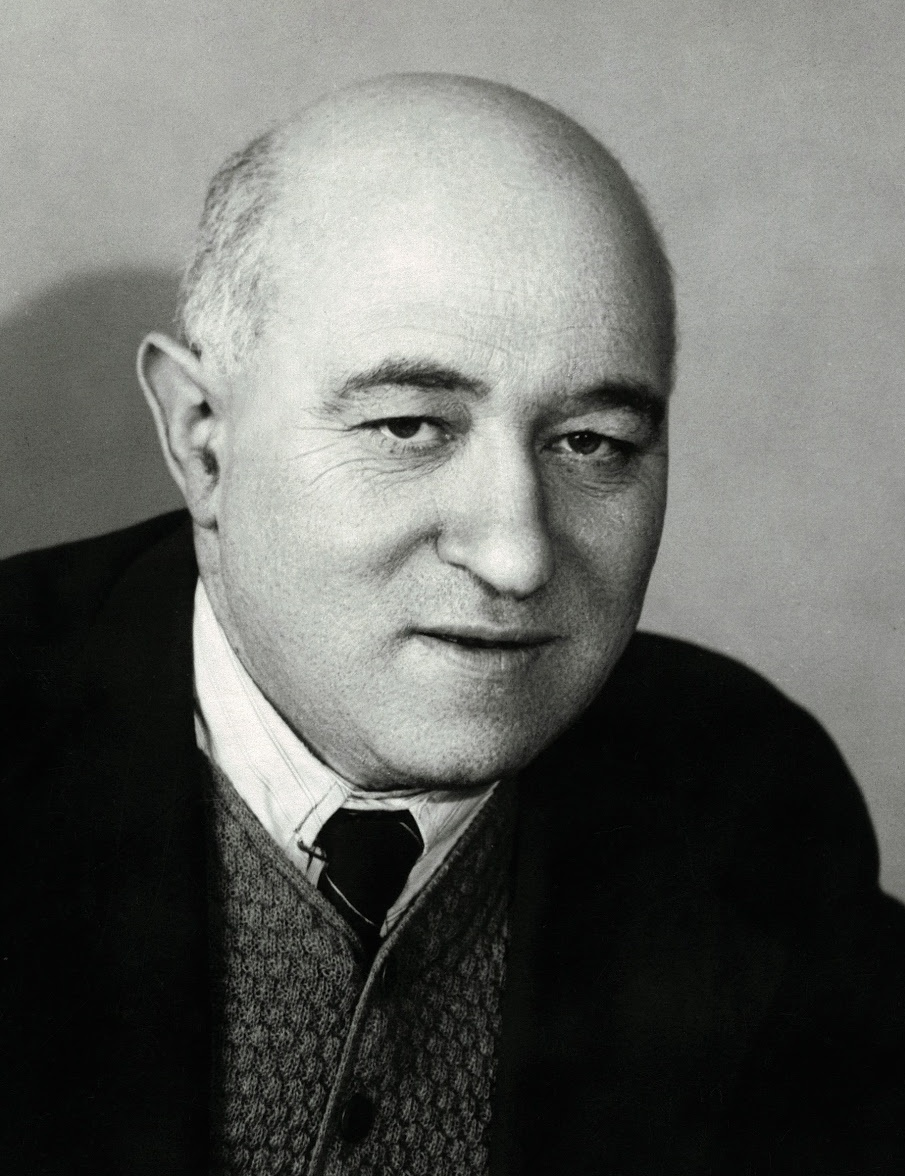

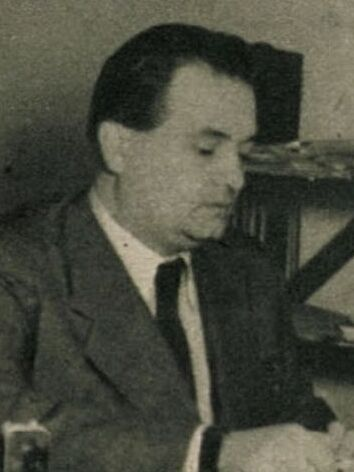

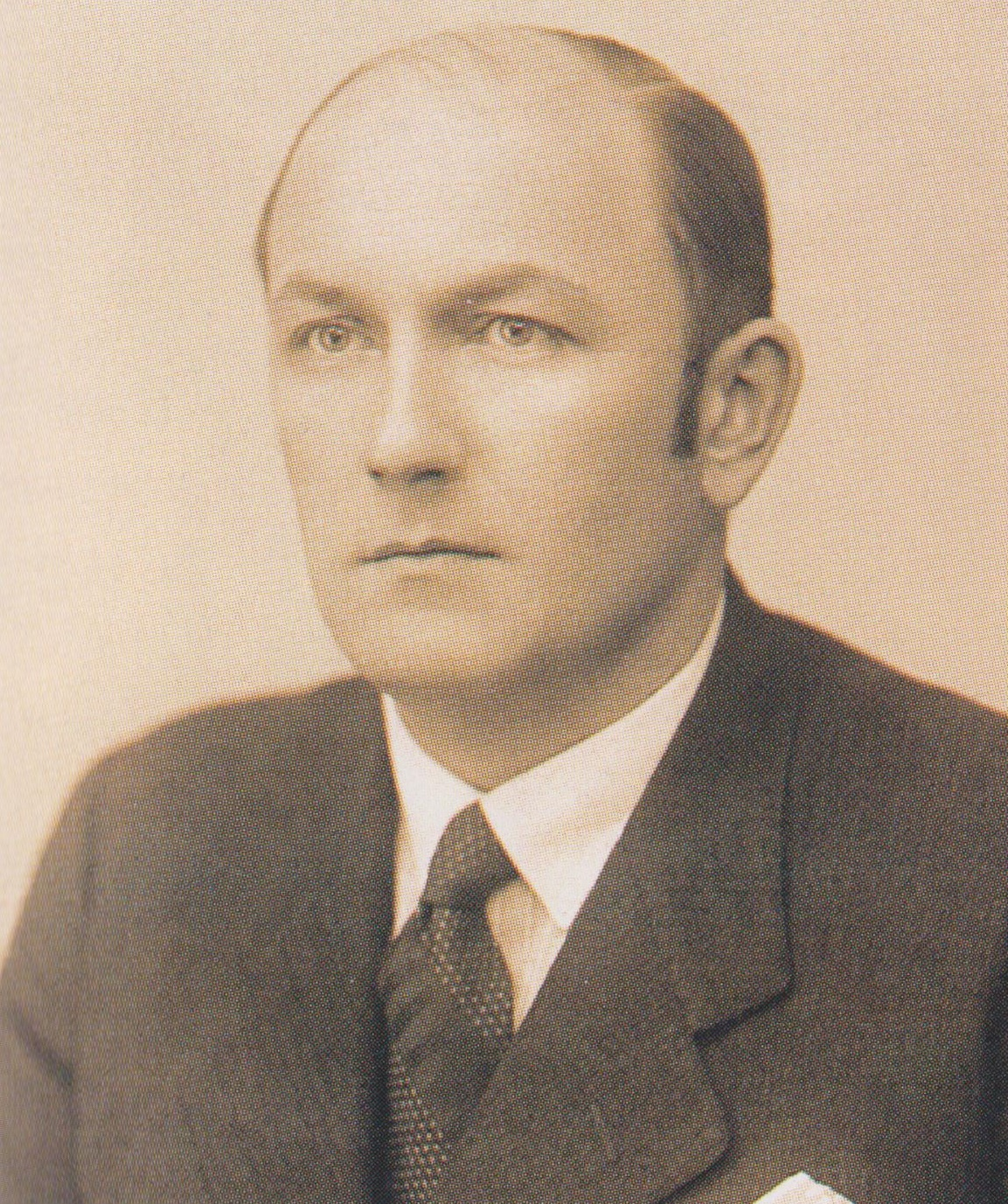

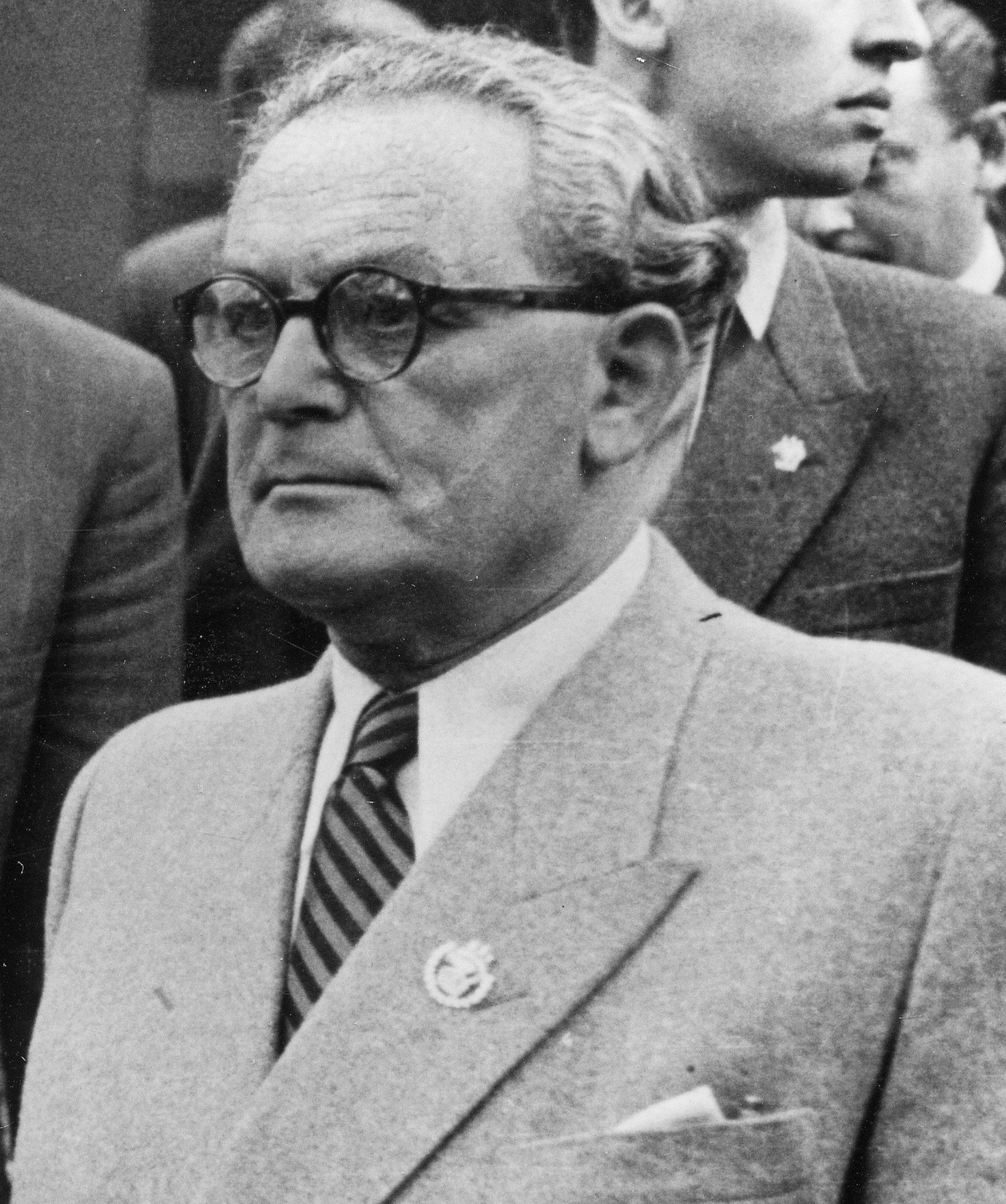

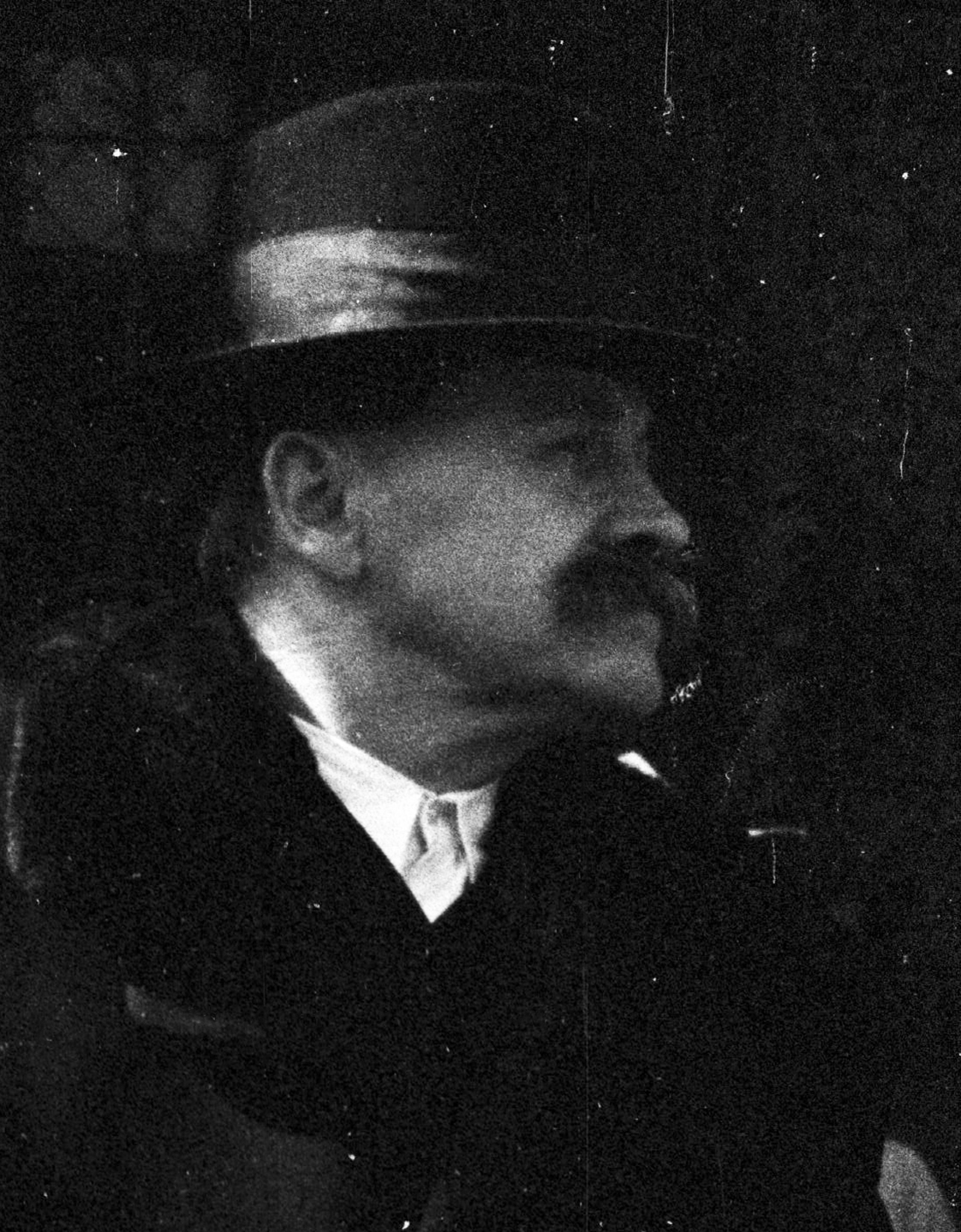
	First party	Second party	Third party
Leader	Mátyás Rákosi	István Barankovics	Lajos Dinnyés
Party	MKP	DNP	FKgP
Alliance	BB		BB ally
Leader since	23 February 1945	8 May 1945	14 March 1947
Seats won	100 / 411	60 / 411	68 / 411
Popular vote	1,111,001	824,259	766,000
Percentage	22.25% ▲5.29 pp	16.50% ▲14.88 pp	15.34% ▼41.69 pp
	Fourth party	Fifth party	Sixth party
Leader	Árpád Szakasits	Zoltán Pfeiffer	Péter Veres
Party	MSZDP	MFP	NPP
Alliance	BB		BB
Leader since	October 1944	August 1947	March 1945
Seats won	67 / 411	49 / 411	36 / 411
Popular vote	742,171	670,751	413,409
Percentage	14.86% ▼2.55 pp	13.43% ▲13.43 pp	8.28% ▲1.41 pp
Prime Minister before election
Lajos Dinnyés
FKGP
Prime Minister after election
Lajos Dinnyés
FKGP

Parliamentary elections, which later became known as the "blue-ballot" elections (Hungarian: kékcédulás választás), were held in Hungary on 31 August 1947. The Hungarian Communist Party, which had lost the previous election, consolidated its power in the interim using salami tactics. Communist-led political intrigues had deprived their opposition of its democratically won mandate from 1945, as numerous prominent anti-Communists were removed from office on charges of conspiracy. These conspiracies reached a climax in late May 1947, when the Hungarian Communist Party deposed the democratically elected prime minister Ferenc Nagy in a coup d'état, removing one of the strongest opponents to their rule and crippling the opposition. This weakening of the opposition, combined with a revised electoral law, led to further Communist gains. This would be the last remotely competitive election held in Hungary until 1990.

== Background ==
The National Assembly after the 1945 elections.

Composition of the National Assembly in June 1947. By the dissolution of Parliament, the Smallholders' original absolute majority of 245 seats had been reduced to a plurality of 187 due to mass Communist arrests of its members and expulsions from the coalition.

The Independent Smallholders' Party had won a large majority in the previous elections in 1945, but the Soviet-dominated Allied Control Commission had forced it into a coalition government which gave the Hungarian Communist Party key positions including the Ministry of Interior. Communist intrigues had then forced dozens of potent political rivals out of the ruling coalition on the grounds of ostensible reaction. In early 1947, the Communists accused large sections of the Smallholders' Party of complicity in the "Hungarian Fraternal Community" conspiracy, using it as an excuse to expel over 40 MPs and deprive the FKGP of its legally won parliamentary majority. In the process, Soviet troops kidnapped Béla Kovács—general secretary of the Smallholders' Party—on 25 February and deported him to the USSR, where he would be imprisoned for eight years. This had culminated in the ouster of the democratically elected Prime Minister Ferenc Nagy, who was blackmailed into exile in May 1947 under threat of being "revealed" as part of the plot.

Earlier, the National Assembly had passed a law that barred statements hostile to the "democratic order" or harmed Hungary's international reputation. Increasingly, this law was used to legally gag the opposition. The Communists also began pushing leaders of the non-Communist parties out of the government after branding them as "reactionaries" or "anti-democratic." In some cases, this was a prelude to their arrest.

The expelled deputies had formed new parties like the Hungarian Freedom Party (SZP) under Dezső Sulyok outside the governing coalition, but in July 1947 the now Communist-dominated Parliament dissolved the Freedom Party under a law intended to deprive its electorate of the vote. Sulyok went into exile soon after, and the anti-Communist opposition became divided between several parties. From this position of strength, the Communists began to organize new elections, confident that they could win them.

Preparations began for the elections in the summer of 1947, with Soviet troops still in the country. The Communists intended to exploit the situation that arose as a result of the disarray of their main rival, the Independent Smallholders Party, to gain a clear majority in the legislature. Their campaign's central theme was the party's national character; during the coalition years, the Communists had presented themselves as the champion of national interests and as heirs to the nation's tradition. During these preparations, two events clearly indicated the politicisation of economic issues and the economic significance of political decisions. Following pressure from Moscow, on 10 July the Hungarian government announced its abstention from the conference that was discussing the Marshall Plan for Europe's postwar reconstruction. Slightly earlier, a State Planning Office was created, the three-year plan as urged by the Communists in the previous year was enacted, and on 1 August its implementation began.

A new electoral law (Lex Sulyok) was also introduced, which excluded about 466,000 people (almost a tenth of the electorate) on grounds of membership of the pre-war fascist party.

== Parties and leaders ==
In order to divide the opposition, the Communist-controlled election commission amended the electoral laws to allow for the registration of more political parties than in 1945. Most of the new parties—primarily the Democratic People's Party, Independence Party and Independent Democratic Party—were composed of former members of the Smallholders' Party.

Party		Ideology	Leader
Government	Hungarian Communist Party (MKP)	Communism Marxism-Leninism	Mátyás Rákosi
Government	Independent Smallholders' Party (FKgP)	Agrarianism Big tent	István Dobi
Government	Hungarian Social Democratic Party (MSzDP)	Social democracy Democratic socialism	Árpád Szakasits
Government	National Peasant Party (NPP)	Agrarian socialism Left-wing populism	Péter Veres
Opposition	Democratic People's Party (DNP)	Christian democracy Christian socialism	István Barankovics
Opposition	Hungarian Independence Party (MFP)	National conservatism Anti-communism	Zoltán Pfeiffer
Opposition	Independent Hungarian Democratic Party (FMDP)	Liberalism	István Balogh
Opposition	Christian Women's League (KNT)	Christian democracy Christian feminism	Margit Slachta
Opposition	Civic Democratic Party (PDP)	Liberalism National liberalism	Ernő Bródy
Opposition	Hungarian Radical Party (MRP)	Liberalism Social liberalism	Imre Csécsy

== Results ==
Despite rigging the elections (more than 50,000 fraudulent votes were cast for them) the Communists only managed to increase their vote share to 22% and failed to attain an absolute majority even with the other parties of the Left Wing Bloc. Although the emasculated and demoralised Smallholders only received 15% of the vote, other non-leftist parties did well; the Democratic People's Party of István Barankovics came second (keeping alive a real opposition and showing the strength of popular commitment to pluralism) and Zoltán Pfeiffer's Independence Party was not far behind the Social Democrats. Parties outside the governing coalition won a total of 40% of the vote, despite Rákosi's pre-election predictions that they would only win 15%. The Smallholders' Party and other non-leftists — the DNP, MFP and FMDP — received a total of 2.5 million votes overall (around 51%), roughly the same vote share that the Smallholders had received two years earlier. The combined non-Communist and non-Left Bloc parties still wielded a narrow majority of seats in the legislature. In addition, the Communists inserted a clause into the electoral law stating that the four government parties could divide over 80% of seats between them on the national list if the coalition won more than 60% of the vote. The governing parties had only barely exceeded this limit under the influence of the blue slips. This new rule was especially harmful to the Democratic People’s Party, which won the second-largest number of votes but received the fourth-largest number of mandates.

Party	Votes	%	Seats			
Party	Votes	%	Constituency	National List	Total	+/–
Hungarian Communist Party	1,111,001	22.25	79	21	100	+30
Democratic People's Party	824,259	16.50	58	2	60	New
Independent Smallholders Party	766,000	15.34	54	14	68	–177
Social Democratic Party of Hungary	742,171	14.86	53	14	67	–2
Hungarian Independence Party	670,751	13.43	47	2	49	New
National Peasant Party	413,409	8.28	29	7	36	+13
Independent Hungarian Democratic Party	262,109	5.25	18	0	18	New
Hungarian Radical Party	85,535	1.71	6	0	6	+6
Christian Women's League	69,363	1.39	4	0	4	New
Civic Democratic Party	49,740	1.00	3	0	3	+1
Total	4,994,338	100.00	351	60	411	+2
Valid votes	4,994,338	99.36				
Invalid/blank votes	31,950	0.64				
Total votes	5,026,288	100.00				
Source: Nohlen & Stöver

== Aftermath ==
Although the Left Bloc failed to win a parliamentary majority, the Smallholders' left wing thwarted a coalition initiative from the two main opposition parties, and the previous government coalition remained in office. The remaining non-collaborationist Smallholders made a final attempt to take over the party at its congress in September, but the fellow-travelling leaders thwarted this. The manageable Smallholder Lajos Dinnyés remained Prime Minister and dutiful fellow travelers from other parties were named to the cabinet for the sake of preserving the parliamentary facade. Cominform came into being just days after the new Dinnyés government took office. In December 1948 Dinnyés was ultimately replaced by the leader of the Smallholders' left wing: the openly pro-Communist István Dobi, who had been a secret card-carrying member of the Communist Party for years.

Still, the opposition was large enough so that only extra-parliamentary means could eliminate it. On 4 November, the Communist-controlled election commission accused the Hungarian Independence Party of fraud and summarily nullified all its parliamentary mandates—leaving over 700,000 voters unrepresented—and its leader Zoltán Pfeiffer fled into exile soon after. The vacant seats were not filled, leaving the Communists and their allies with an increased proportion. The remaining effective opposition parties steadily buckled under Communist pressure over the course of the following year, with their members either arrested, deprived of their mandates, or fleeing into exile. Communist persecution radically changed the composition of Parliament prior to the next elections in 1949. By the dissolution of Parliament, more than 120 of the remaining 364 MPs were members not elected in 1947, a rate of turnover unmatched in Hungarian political history. Intimidation, targeting of the increasingly submissive democratic parties (and absorption of the Social Democrats), nationalisation, collectivisation and other measures soon rendered the 1945–47 period a short democratic interlude, with the Communists soon wielding exclusive power.
