= Christian Women's League =

Hungary political party

The Christian Women's League (Hungarian: Keresztény Női Tábor, KNT) was a political party in Hungary in the period after World War II.

== History ==
The party was founded in 1918 as a Catholic Social movement. It was initially led by Margit Slachta, who became the first woman elected to the Hungarian Parliament in 1920 as a representative of the Christian National Union Party. Slachta lost her seat in the 1922 elections after she was prevented from running again.

She returned to Parliament following the 1945 elections, in which she was elected on the Civic Democratic Party list. However, she resigned from the party in January 1946 to sit as an independent. Subsequently the Christian Women's League ran as a standalone party in the 1947 elections, winning four seats. Prior to the 1949 elections, several parties were forced to join the Communist-led Hungarian Independent People's Front, with the Front running a single list chosen by the Hungarian Working People's Party. Slachta applied to run in the elections, but was turned down.
