= Margit Slachta =

Hungarian nun and politician (1884–1974)

Margit Slachta SSS
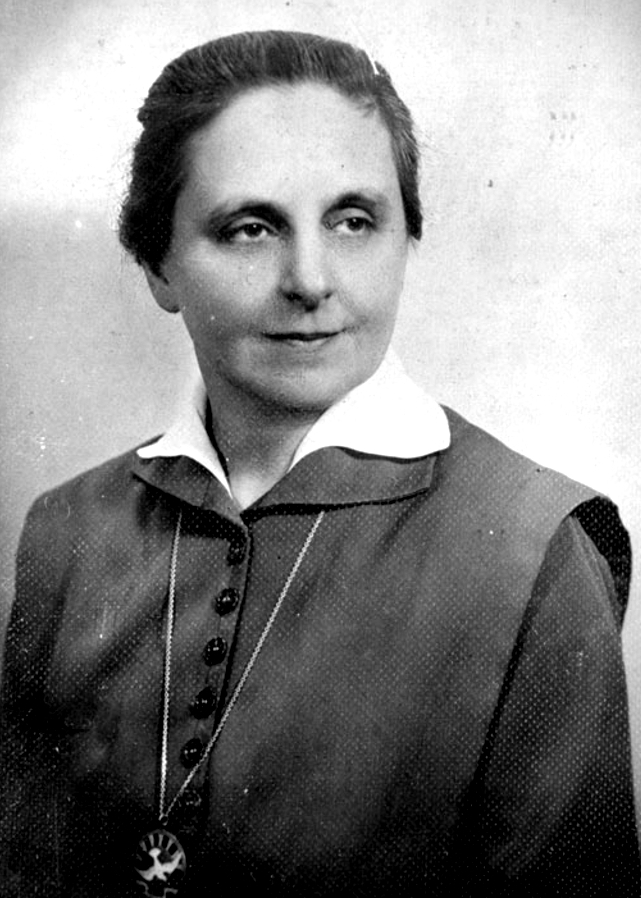
- Margin Slachta dressed in the SSS habit
- Born: September 18, 1884; Kassa, Kingdom of Hungary, Austria-Hungary
- Died: January 6, 1974 (aged 89); Buffalo, New York, USA
- Other name: Margit Schlachta
- Occupation: Sisters of Social Service
- Known for: Political action, Social work

Margit Slachta, SSS (or Schlachta; September 18, 1884 – January 6, 1974) was a Hungarian Catholic religious sister, social activist, politician, and member of parliament of the Kingdom of Hungary. In 1920 she was the first woman to be elected to the Diet of Hungary, and in 1923 she founded the Sisters of Social Service, a Catholic religious institute for women.

== Biography ==
Born in Kassa, Abaúj-Torna County, Hungary, in 1884, at a young age Margit and her parents left to live in the United States for a brief period. Upon their return to Hungary, Margit trained at a Catholic school in Budapest as a French and German language teacher.

A champion of human rights, she formed the Union of Catholic Women, an organization to promote the female franchise in Hungary, and in 1920 became the first woman to be elected to the Hungarian diet. In 1908 Slachta joined a religious community, the Society of the Social Mission. In 1923 she founded the Sisters of Social Service. The Social Sisters were well known throughout Hungary for nursing, midwifery, and orphanage services. The community opened professional schools for social work in Budapest and Cluj. Some students joined the religious community, others joined an affiliated lay association.

The first anti-Jewish laws were passed in Hungary in 1938, and from that time on, Slachta published articles opposing anti-Jewish measures in her newspaper, Voice of the Spirit. In 1943 the government suppressed her newspaper, but Slachta continued to publish it "underground".

Hungary joined the Axis Powers in 1940. In the autumn of 1940, Jewish families of Csíkszereda were deported, eventually arriving in Kőrösmező in Carpathia-Ruthenia. Slachta responded immediately to reports in 1940 of early displacement of Jews. She wrote to the parish priest at Kőrösmező requesting him to inquire into their welfare. The removal process stopped on the evening of 9 December when a telegram from the Ministry of Defense ordered the release of the detainees. It was the same day as the dateline on her letter to the parish priest. The report reveals that the captain in charge had received a telegram at 7:00 p.m. that ordered him to immediately release the Jews in his custody and to send them back to Csíkszereda.

She coupled zeal for social justice religious convictions in rescue and relief efforts. In the years immediately following World War II, she raised awareness of the considerable contribution of Protestant churches in rescue efforts.

I stand without compromise, on the foundation of Christian values; that is, I profess that love obliges us to accept natural laws for our fellow-men without exception which God gave and which cannot be taken away.

Slachta sheltered the persecuted, protested forced labour and anti-semitic laws, and went to Rome in 1943 to encourage papal action against the Jewish persecutions.

Slachta told her sisters that the precepts of their faith demanded that they protect the Jews, even if it led to their own deaths. When in 1941, 20,000 were deported, Slachta protested to the wife of Admiral Horthy. The Nazis occupied Hungary in 1944, and commenced widescale deportations of Jews. Slachta's sisters arranged baptisms in the hope it would spare people from deportation, sent food and supplies to the Jewish ghettos, and sheltered people in their convents. One of Slachta's sisters, Sára Salkaházi was executed by the Arrow Cross, and Slachta herself was beaten and only narrowly avoided execution. The sisters likely rescued more than 2000 Hungarian Jews. In 1985, Yad Vashem recognized Margit Slachta as Righteous Among the Nations.

She returned to Parliament following the 1945 elections, in which she was elected on the Civic Democratic Party list. However, she resigned from the party in January 1946 to sit as an independent. On January 31, 1946, she was the only member of Parliament to vote against the declaration of a republic and in her speech she defended not only the idea of monarchy, but also the Habsburgs. Subsequently, the Christian Women's League ran as a standalone party in the 1947 elections, winning four seats. Prior to the 1949 elections, several parties were forced to join the Communist-led Hungarian Independent People's Front, with the Front running a single list chosen by the Hungarian Working People's Party. Slachta applied to run in the elections, but was turned down.

== Bibliography ==
- Mona, Ilona. (1997). Slachta Margit (OCLC 246094536)
