= National Peasant Party =

National Peasant Party may refer to:

- National Peasant Party (Hungary)
- National Peasants' Party, a political party in Romania
