= Independent Smallholders, Agrarian Workers and Civic Party =

Independent Smallholders, Agrarian Workers and Civic Party Független Kisgazda, Földmunkás és Polgári Párt
- Leader: Károly Balogh
- Founded: 12 October 1930 27 October 1956 18 November 1988
- Dissolved: 1949 (1st) 4 November 1956 (2nd)
- Headquarters: 1092. Budapest, Kinizsi u. 22.
- Newspaper: Kis Újság (1956)
- Youth wing: Smallholder Youth Section
- Ideology: Agrarianism; Hungarian nationalism Right-wing populism National conservatism Anti-communism Historical (1930s–40s): Agrarian socialism Democratization Anti-fascism Anti-communism (factions) Civic nationalism Republicanism (factions)
- Political position: Right-wing Historical: Big tent
- International affiliation: Green International (historical)
- Colours: Green
- Slogan: Isten, Haza, Család; God, Homeland, Family
- National Assembly: 0 / 199
- European Parliament: 0 / 21

Website
- fkgp.hu

The Independent Smallholders, Agrarian Workers and Civic Party (Hungarian: Független Kisgazda-, Földmunkás- és Polgári Párt), known mostly by its acronym FKgP or its shortened form Independent Smallholders' Party (Hungarian: Független Kisgazdapárt), is a political party in Budapest, Hungary.

During its existence, the party participated in the establishment of Hungarian democracy after World War II and the Third Republic. After the change of regime, it participated in the government for two terms (1990–1994 and 1998–2002). Since the 2002 parliamentary elections, the party has not won any seats in the parliament.

Index includes the FKgP among the fake parties, as it received fewer votes than it collected recommendations. Liquidation proceedings were initiated against the party in 2021.

== History ==
Founded on 12 October 1930 after splitting from the Unity Party, the party was one of the largest anti-fascist opposition parties in the 1930s and during World War II. Representing the interests of landed peasants along with some poor peasants and urban middle class, it advocated for land reform and democratization. Its members opposed Hungary's participation in World War II, giving anti-fascist speeches in Parliament and leading rallies as late as 1943. During the German occupation of Hungary, its members took part in the clandestine anti-fascist resistance movement, and played a major role in the provisional government established in the Soviet-occupied zone of the country. At this time it absorbed several other parties and became quite heterogenous, with tendencies ranging from right-wing to left wing.

The original party won a majority in the first elections after the Second World War, resulting in its leader, Zoltán Tildy, becoming prime minister. In the elections in November 1945, the Smallholders' polled 57% of votes against the Communists' 17%. Despite this victory, the Soviet-dominated Allied Control Commission forced the winning party into a grand coalition government with the other parties including the Communists. The Smallholders-dominated parliament established a republic in 1946 with Tildy as president. He was succeeded as prime minister by Ferenc Nagy. Meanwhile, the Communists had formed a "Left Bloc" with the Social Democrats and National Peasants, opposed to the majority Smallholders on every issue with the intent of creating deadlock and facilitating the latter's breakup. Their first demand was the expulsion of twenty "reactionaries" from the Smallholder-led coalition. These people went on to form the Hungarian Freedom Party, the most vocal opposition force over the next year.

From December 1946, the Communists exaggerated a minor intrigue involving several anti-Communist politicians to accuse vast swaths of the Smallholders' Party of complicity in a reactionary plot. The Communist political police (ÁVO) began to arrest hundreds of Smallholders' Party members, ultimately depriving that party of its elected majority in Parliament. Acting in tandem with this, Soviet troops kidnapped the party's General Secretary Béla Kovács on 25 February 1947 and deported him to the USSR, where he would be imprisoned for over eight years. When Prime Minister Nagy travelled abroad in May, the Communists seized the opportunity to remove him from office. They accused him of conspiracy in the alleged plot and threatened to harm his son if he did not resign. Nagy, unwilling to risk his own life or that of his family, ratified his resignation on 2 June 1947.

The Smallholders' Party was effectively finished as a political force, and its leaders were now co-opted as fellow travellers. Its member Lajos Dinnyés became the new Prime Minister, but the Communists effectively controlled his government. Politicians expelled from the Smallholders after the Communist intrigues formed new parties, primarily the Democratic People's Party, Hungarian Independence Party and Independent Hungarian Democratic Party. New elections in August massively reduced the Smallholders' Party's share of votes and seats in Parliament, but this was mostly in favor of the parties which had succeeded from them. Combined, the FKGP and its offshoots had roughly the same number of votes the party had won in the 1945 election.

Despite this, the rump party's fellow-travelling leaders formed a coalition with the Communists, who now had increased representation. Most of the remaining non-collaborationist Smallholders were forced out of the party and into exile over the next two years. President Tildy, now politically isolated, was forced to resign in July 1948. Another Smallholder, the openly pro-Communist István Dobi, became premier in December 1948, and pushed out the remaining elements of the party who were not willing to stop their obstruction. In 1949, the party was absorbed into a People's Independent Front, led by the communist Hungarian Working People's Party. The latter prevailed in elections held that year, marking the onset of Hungarian People's Republic. The Smallholders party was dissolved later in 1949, and Dobi and several other left-wing Smallholders joined the Communist Party.

During the Hungarian Revolution of 1956 the Smallholders' Party was revived under the leadership of Zoltan Tildy and Béla Kovács, who had returned from Soviet exile earlier that year. Both of them joined the democratic coalition government of Imre Nagy on 27 October 1956 which was brought to power in the Revolution, as the first non-Communists in the government since 1948. However, the party was unable to function after the Soviet invasion which crushed the Revolution.

After the end of Communism in Hungary, the Smallholders' Party was revived again and took part in the center-right governments of József Antall, Péter Boross, and Viktor Orbán. In the 2002 Hungarian parliamentary election it lost all its seats in Parliament, and has not regained a seat since.

In early 2019, Our Homeland Movement (Mi Hazánk Mozgalom) made an alliance with the far-right Hungarian Justice and Life Party (MIÉP) and FKgP.

On August 3, 2021, Kuruc.info published an article in which they revealed that the national court initiated liquidation proceedings against the party for its massive debts. The article also revealed that all the remaining members of the party would run in 2022 elections on the list of Our Homeland Movement.

== Party leaders ==
| | Image | Name | Entered office | Left office | | Image | Name | Entered office | Left office |
|---|---|---|---|---|---|---|---|---|---|
| 1 | | Bálint Szijj | 1930 | 1931 | 10 | | Tivadar Pártay | 1988 | 1989 |
| 2 | | Gaszton Gaál | 1931 | 1932 | 11 | | Vince Vörös | 1989 | 1990 |
| 3 | | Tibor Eckhardt | 1932 | 1940 | 12 | | Ferenc József Nagy | 1990 | 1991 |
| 4 | | Zoltán Tildy | 1940 | 1944 | 13 | | József Torgyán | 1991 | 2002 |
| 5 | | István Balogh | 1944 | 1945 | 14 | | Miklós Réti | 2002 | 2005 |
| 6 | | Zoltán Tildy | 1945 | 1946 | 15 | | Péter Hegedűs | 2005 | 2017 |
| 7 | | Ferenc Nagy | 1946 | 1947 | 16 | | Károly Balogh | 2017 | 2018 |
| 8 | | István Dobi | 1947 | 1949 | 17 | | Roland Hajdara | 2018 | 2020 |
| 9 | | Béla Kovács | 1956 | 1956 | 18 | | Károly Balogh | 2020 | 2021 |

== Election results ==
=== National Assembly ===
| Election | Votes | | | Seats | | Rank | Government | Leader |
| Election | # | % | ±pp | # | +/− | Rank | Government | Leader |
|---|---|---|---|---|---|---|---|---|
| 1931 | 173,477 | 11.48% | – | 10 / 245 | | 4th | in opposition | Gaszton Gaál |
| 1935 | 387,351 | 19.62% | ▲8.14 | 22 / 245 | ▲12 | 2nd | in opposition | Tibor Eckhardt |
| 1939 | 569,054 | 14,56% | ▼5.06 | 14 / 260 | ▼8 | 3rd | in opposition | Tibor Eckhardt |
| 1944 | n/a | n/a | n/a | 124 / 498 | ▲110 | 3rd | FKGP–MKP–MSZDP–NPP–PDP | n/a |
| 1945 | 2,697,262 | 57.03% | ▲42.47 | 245 / 409 | ▲121 | 1st | FKGP–MKP–MSZDP–NPP | Zoltán Tildy |
| 1947 | 766,000 | 15.34% | ▼41.69 | 68 / 411 | ▼177 | 2nd | MKP–FKGP–MSZDP–NPP (until 1948) | Lajos Dinnyés |
| 1947 | 766,000 | 15.34% | ▼41.69 | 68 / 411 | ▼177 | 2nd | MDP–FKGP–NPP (from 1948) | Lajos Dinnyés |
| 1949^{1} | 5,478,515 | 97.1% | ▲81.76 | 62 / 402 | ▼6 | 1st | MFN (MDP–FKGP–NPP) | Mátyás Rákosi |
| 1990 | 576,256 | 11.74% | – | 44 / 386 | | 3rd | MDF–FKGP–KDNP (until 1992) | Vince Vörös |
| 1990 | 576,256 | 11.74% | – | 44 / 386 | | 3rd | in opposition | Vince Vörös |
| 1994 | 476,416 | 8.82% | ▼2.92 | 26 / 386 | ▼18 | 4th | in opposition | József Torgyán |
| 1998 | 617,740 | 13.78% | ▲4.96 | 48 / 386 | ▲22 | 3rd | Fidesz–FKGP–MDF | József Torgyán |
| 2002 | 42,338 | 0.75% | ▼13.03 | 0 / 386 | ▼48 | 6th | extra-parliamentary | Miklós Réti |
| 2006 | 838 | 0.02% | ▼0.73 | 0 / 386 | 0 | 16th | extra-parliamentary | Péter Hegedűs |
| 2010 | 381 | 0.01% | ▼0.01 | 0 / 386 | 0 | 19th | extra-parliamentary | Péter Hegedűs |
| 2014 | 7,426 | 0.16% | ▲0.15 | 0 / 199 | 0 | 16th | extra-parliamentary | Péter Hegedűs |
| 2018 | 1,580 | 0.03% | ▼0.13 | 0 / 199 | 0 | 39th | extra-parliamentary | Károly Balogh |

^{1}FKGP was a member of the Communist-led Hungarian Independence People's Front (MFN). Hungary became a one-party state after the 1949 election.
