= Collectivization in Hungary =

Land reform process in communist Hungary

In the Hungarian People's Republic, agricultural collectivization was attempted a number of times in the late 1940s, until it was finally successfully implemented in the early 1960s. By consolidating individual landowning farmers into agricultural co-operatives, the Communist government hoped to increase production and efficiency, and put agriculture under the control of the state.

== Post-War background ==
In early 1945, the provisional Hungarian government had appointed “land claimants” committees to examine the situation of the peasantry and develop a plan for land reform. When the proposed legislation was passed in March, it merely acknowledged the seizures the peasants had already undertaken. Prior to the reforms, half of agricultural land had controlled by large, privately owned “hacienda-type” estates. The provisional government legislation redistributed 35% of Hungary's territory, some 93,000 square kilometers of land. While the wealthy who lost their land in the deal had obviously lost out, the problems of smaller peasant landholders were by no means solved. Many of them saw only slight increases in their property size to 11,000 square meters, “too small to provide a livelihood, let alone the basis for efficient agricultural production.” These smallholders formed a political party which won a significant majority in the November election, but political maneuvering and election fraud by the Communists led to its failure in the following election.

== First attempt at collectivization ==
While it remains unclear how the Smallholders Party would have solved the problems resulting from their dwarf properties, the plans of the Hungarian Working People's Party (MDP) soon became clear. The model of Stalinist collectivization would be adopted and applied with physical force if necessary. In July 1948, government regulations allowed the seizure of larger landholdings from nagygazdák (Hungarian [kulak]s). These regulations enabled over 800 square kilometers of land to be confiscated, 60% of which went to recently formed farming co-operatives, the rest going to private peasants. This first serious attempt at collectivization corresponded with the first Five Year Plan, and both bore the marks of Stalinist agricultural policy. Both economic and direct police pressure were used to coerce peasants to join co-operatives, but large numbers opted instead to leave their villages. In the early 1950s, only one quarter of peasants agreed to join co-operatives. Even once collectivized, farms were subject to harsh compulsory deliveries (production quotas in physical units passed down from central planning) and incredibly low agricultural producer prices. Although individual families were allowed a small private household plot intended to serve their own personal needs, decrees passed in 1949 and 1950 limited these plots with an absolute limit of 4,300 square meters, and its output was also subject to compulsory deliveries. The Five Year Plan initially promised 11 billion forints of credit for co-operatives (later downscaled to 8 million) but by 1953, less than half of that had been made available. Without credit from the government, or any reasonable ability to earn a surplus, peasants were unable to invest in their own farms and the co-operatives began to crumble.

== Nagy's New Course and Rákosi's return ==
Although certainly not radical, Imre Nagy's “New Course,” introduced in 1954, promised an easing of social tension between co-operatives and the state. First, the compulsory deliveries were abolished, alleviating much stress for farmers. Second, the government devoted nearly one quarter of its national investment to agriculture and in just one year “more tractors were put into service than during the entire 1950-3 period.” These new beginnings would not last long, however, as power struggles within the MDP in the spring of 1955 led to Mátyás Rákosi's return to power and a condemnation of the “right deviation” supported in the Nagy's New Course. Rákosi renewed the drive for collectivization, again using physical force to encourage membership. This attempt failed to last even as long as the previous drive. Nikita Khrushchev's secret speech and Rákosi's ensuing resignation led to second failure at collectivization. The weaknesses in the Stalinist model had been rather apparent to some after the first wave in the early 1950s, but the inflexibility of the Rákosi government left no room for any creative solutions.

== 1957 Agrarian Theses ==
After the events of the 1956 Hungarian Revolution and the re-establishment of political order, officials of the new Hungarian Socialist Workers' Party (MSzMP) began to draw up a plan for a more gradual collectivization drive. Like Nagy's New Course, the changes suggested in the July 1957 Agrarian Theses were not drastic, but they made room for the possibility of further reforms. Some changes came almost immediately. The compulsory deliveries were not reintroduced and the purchasing prices introduced in 1957 were 80% higher than the compulsory prices had been.

=== Tractors and machine stations ===
The government began to allow the co-operatives to purchase limited amounts of machinery for their own use. Until this point, all farm machinery had been kept in special state-run machine stations, but new regulations encouraged co-operatives to buy most forms of light machinery. By the end of the year, the 2557 existing agricultural co-operatives had purchased over 1000 light tractors. In March 1958, Khrushchev suggested that machine stations had outlived their usefulness, and they were soon abolished. More purchasing of machinery was allowed the following year, and in 1961, a number of machine stations were allowed to sell off their obsolete machines. Furthermore, the machine stations in Turkeve and Székesfehérvár were converted into repair shops. Out of 235 machine stations in use in 1961, only 63 were open in 1964 and by the end of the decade, only a few remained in poor areas. Most of the stations were transformed into repair shops to service the machinery quickly being acquired by the co-operatives. The new independent machine ownership would later spawn further demands by the collective farmers.

=== Household plots and sharecropping ===
Another shift that resulted from the Agrarian Theses was a new willingness on the part of Party to accept household plots belonging to members of co-operative farms. The acceptance of household plots grew primarily out of necessity; the infrastructure required to shelter livestock co-operatively could simply not be built quickly enough. The government adopted the common-sense solution of allowing members to keep animals on their household plots. The solution was a good fit. The farmers enjoyed the benefits of keeping their own animals (including milk, eggs, even calves and piglets) and the government avoided the unnecessary slaughter of animals that would have resulted from strict enforcement. Although the household plots had long existed, the idea of household stock-breeding was not approved of by everyone. In 1959, a report to the Political Committee worried that in some areas, local farm leaders continued to oppose the creation of household plots and made life difficult for those private owners. Government attempts push for tolerance of their measures stressed the “transitional” nature of the situation. In the summer of 1960, Lajos Fehér, Deputy Prime Minister, insisted that "...[h]ousehold farming is an integral complementary part of cooperative farming ... It will be needed so long as the economic activity of the co-operative ... has not reached a high enough level for collective production to take over the supply . . . In many places the transitional measures are being branded in a sectarian manner as 'capitalist tendencies' or regarded as some sort of 'sin or act against socialism' ... These damaging, narrow-minded ideas must now be forcefully eliminated, and everybody must understand ... the country needs meat!"

Also allowed was the practice of sharecropping, in which co-operatively owned land was divided up between families and worked on relatively independently. The family would receive pay based on their work hours but also a percentage of the surplus from their particular strip of land. This helped to motivate members to work harder, particularly with crops like potatoes that required more manual labor. Both of these transitional measures integrated pre-soviet “family labor” practices with the ideal “socialist wage labor” to balance ideology with economic well-being.

== Resistance ==
With relatively little use of force, the great wave of collectivization occurred between 1959 and 1961, earlier than forecast in the Agrarian Theses. At the end of this period, more than 95% of agricultural land in Hungary had become the property of collective farms. In February 1961, the Central Committee declared that collectivization had been completed. This quick success should not be confused with enthusiastic adoption of collective idealism on the part of the peasants. Private ownership meant independence and self-sufficiency, collectivization meant negotiation and uncertainty. Although pensions for members of co-operatives were a legal requirement after 1958, some elderly potential members were not convinced of the long-term financial security of co-operatives, and chose to leave their farms to seek industrial work where they were sure of a pension. In the end, however, psychological factors might have been the deciding influence. Demoralized after two successive (and harsh) collectivization campaigns and the events of the 1956 Hungarian Revolution, the peasants were less interested in resisting, and as membership levels increased, those who remained likely grew worried about being left out.

== Benefits ==
Whether or not peasants really wanted to join, the adjustments made to the agricultural system in 1957 clearly managed to satisfy the membership adequately enough that the co-operatives did not fall apart as they had in the past. Like Hungary, Poland and Czechoslovakia underwent a Stalinist phase of collectivization in the 1950s before leaving it behind in the search for a new model. In Poland, a sort of “dual agricultural” model was developed in which 20% of land was controlled by large, inefficient state farms, and the rest privately owned, mostly in the form of small peasant farms. This isolated situation left the peasants open to obvious discrimination and they suffered from a lack of financial and structural support from the state. In Czechoslovakia, the state had only a bare tolerance for household plots and the transitional system was marked by its almost total inflexibility. In contrast, transitional measures in Hungary worked with the concerns of the farmers, allowing them mechanical independence, semi-private production on their household plots and crop-shared fields, and a decent standard of living from higher agricultural producer prices and substantial government investment.

== Drawbacks ==
With the ever-looming uncertainty of collectivization, Hungarian farmers became fearful and hesitant to purchase even simple tools to improve the production of their farms. They feared that their investment would be unable to be reaped by themselves, but would instead be used to benefit others. Additionally, many of the individual farms which operated before the collectivization attempts in the late 1940s and 1950s which were used for specific agricultural niches, such as horse-breeding and viticulture, for which there was a significant market, were changed to instead produce food crops. This, mixed with the inefficiency of the state-run farms, led to an overall decrease in production and profit for many farmers.

== See also ==
- Collectivization in the USSR
- Eastern Bloc economies

== Sources ==
- Nigel Swain, Collective Farms Which Work? (Cambridge: Cambridge University Press, 1985),
- Nigel Swain, Hungary: The Rise and Fall of Feasible Socialism (London: New Left Books, 1992)
- Nigel Swain, Central European Agricultural Structures in Transition (Discussion Paper for Frankfurt Institute for Transition Studies, 1999)
- Iván T. Berend, The Hungarian Economic Reforms 1953-1988 (Cambridge: Cambridge University Press, 1990).
- Peter D. Bell, Peasants in Socialist Transition (Berkeley: University of California Press, 1984)
