= 1949 Hungarian parliamentary election =

← 1947	15 May 1949	1953 →

All 402 seats in the National Assembly
- Turnout: 94.66%
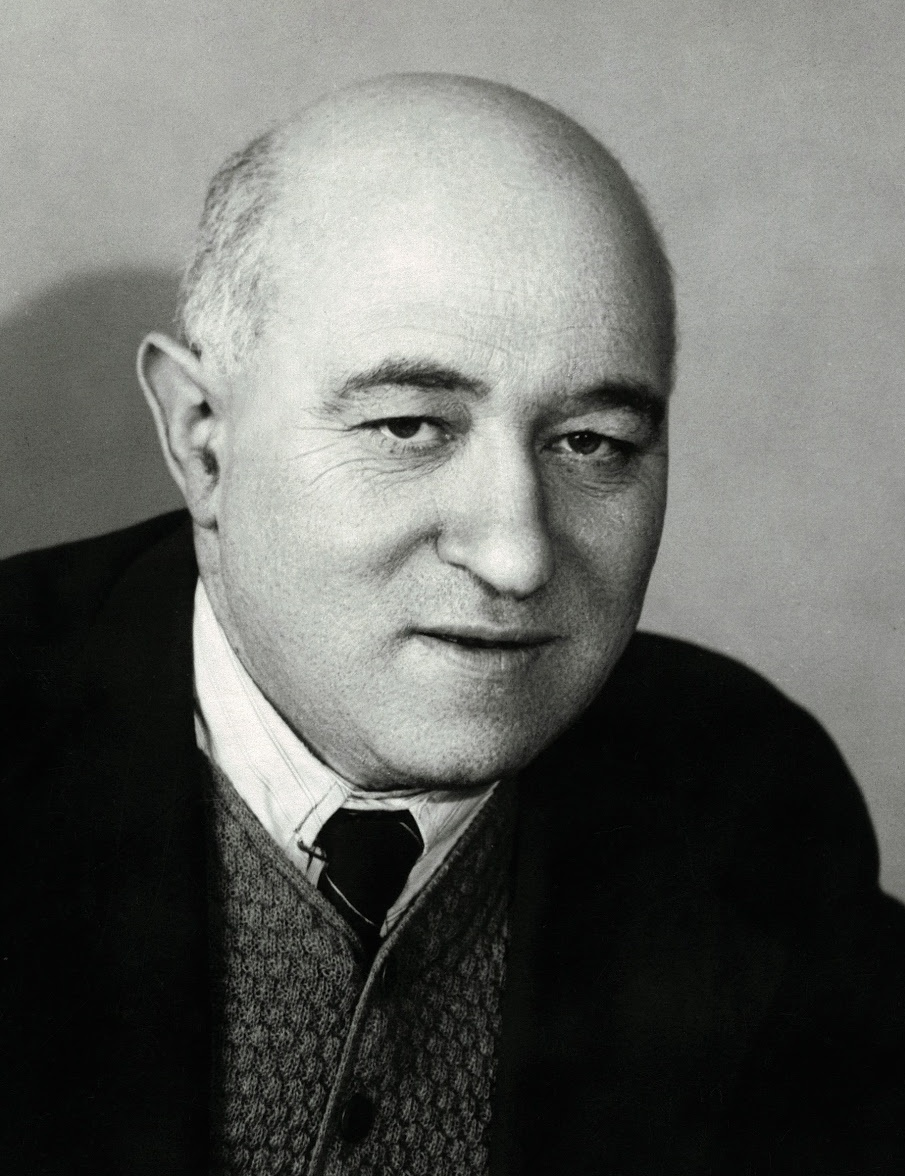
	First party
Leader	Mátyás Rákosi
Party	MDP
Alliance	MFN
Leader since	1 February 1949
Seats won	402
Popular vote	5,478,515
Percentage	97.07%
- Results and seats by constituency
Prime Minister before election
István Dobi
FKGP
Prime Minister after election
István Dobi
FKGP

Parliamentary elections were held in Hungary on 15 May 1949. The Hungarian Independent People's Front, an umbrella group created that February to replace the National Independence Front and led by the Hungarian Working People's Party (as the Hungarian Communist Party had been renamed following a merger with the Hungarian Social Democratic Party), but also including the remaining four non-communist parties, ran a single list of candidates espousing a common programme. With all organised opposition having been paralysed, the Front won 95.6% of the vote, presaging the result of elections through 1990. 71 (17.7%) elected deputies were female, up from 22 (5.4%) elected in 1947. Some 71% of those elected belonged to the Working People's Party, and a similar proportion were workers or peasants.

This election marked the onset of 40 years of communist rule in Hungary. Nonetheless, the government formed after the election was still nominally a coalition. The Smallholders received the Ministries of Trade and Religion and Education in addition to the premiership, and the National Peasants Party receiving Agriculture and Construction. After the election, the Front's local committees dissolved themselves, and with them the National Peasant and Independent Smallholder local organs, although no law or ordinance was ever passed abolishing them.

== Background ==
The Communists had spent the last year and a half tying up loose ends in their bid for total power. They began the final push in October 1947, when they told their non-Communist counterparts to cooperate with a reconfigured, Communist-dominated coalition government or go into exile. By this time, Communist leader Mátyás Rákosi had become the most powerful man in the country.

Communist persecution radically changed the composition of the Parliament elected in 1947. The overall number of members fell by 47 in November 1947, after the Hungarian Independence Party was outlawed and deprived of its parliamentary seats. The Smallholders Party lost 35 of its 68 original members, the Democratic Peoples' Party lost 17 of its 60 seats, the Independent Hungarian Democratic Party lost four members out of 18, the National Peasant Party lost seven out of 36, and the Social Democratic Party lost no less than 40 out of its 67 elected members. By the dissolution of Parliament, more than 120 of the remaining 364 MPs were new members, a rate of turnover unmatched in Hungarian political history.

In June 1948, the Communists forced the Social Democrats to merge with them to form the Working People's Party. However, the few remaining independent-minded Social Democrats were quickly pushed out, leaving the party as essentially a renamed and enlarged Communist Party. Later in June, President Zoltán Tildy, a Smallholder, was replaced by Social Democrat-turned-Communist Árpád Szakasits. In December, Prime Minister Lajos Dinnyés was replaced by fellow Smallholder István Dobi, who made no secret of his sympathies with the Communists.

On 1 January 1949, Hungary became a charter member of Comecon. On 6 February, Cardinal József Mindszenty, the spiritual leader of Hungary's Catholics and a prime opponent of Communism, was sentenced to life imprisonment. The Independent People's Front was formed in February. By the time of its first congress in March, it had become clear that it was to act as a vehicle for destroying rather than bringing together the main parties. Many of the more courageous members of the non-Communist parties had already been forced to resign in the summer of 1948, and the four remaining parties had been taken over by fellow travelers who swiftly turned their parties into loyal partners of the Communists.

== Results ==
Party or alliance		Votes	%	Seats
Hungarian; Independence; People's; Front	Hungarian Working People's Party	5,478,515	97.07	285
Hungarian; Independence; People's; Front	Independent Smallholders Party	5,478,515	97.07	62
Hungarian; Independence; People's; Front	National Peasant Party	5,478,515	97.07	39
Hungarian; Independence; People's; Front	Independent Hungarian Democratic Party	5,478,515	97.07	10
Hungarian; Independence; People's; Front	Hungarian Radical Party	5,478,515	97.07	4
Hungarian; Independence; People's; Front	Independents	5,478,515	97.07	2
Against		165,283	2.93	–
Total		5,643,798	100.00	402
Valid votes		5,643,798	98.49	
Invalid/blank votes		86,721	1.51	
Total votes		5,730,519	100.00	
Registered voters/turnout		6,053,972	94.66	
Source: Nohlen & Stöver

== Aftermath ==
Three months after the election, a new constitution proclaiming Hungary a People's Republic and enshrining the principle of one-party rule was adopted. Schools were nationalised, collectivisation was launched, the bureaucracy was purged, the independent press was destroyed, and the last remnants of free enterprise were eliminated. Also, László Rajk, General Secretary of the Independent People's Front and Foreign Minister, who the day after the election was the main speaker at a mass demonstration where he condemned Titoist "running dogs of imperialism", praised the "brilliant strategy" of the "great leader of the peace camp", Stalin, and the "wise leadership" of Rákosi—described as Stalin's best Hungarian pupil—was himself arrested two weeks later and executed in October following a show trial.
