= István Balogh (politician) =

Hungarian Politician

Father István Balogh (30 March 1894, Budapest – 20 July 1976) was a Hungarian Catholic priest and anti-communist politician who later tolerated the rule of the Hungarian Communist Party.

Balogh initially joined the Independent Smallholders Party. He was part of the Hungarian provisional government established in 1945 and travelled to Moscow to sign the 1945 armistice.

After the war Balogh led the Independent Hungarian Democratic Party (FMDP), a minor opposition group which was largely controlled by the government. His list captured 5.2% of the vote in the 1947 election although his opposition soon died down and he effectively co-operated with the communists despite his personal reservations. Although seen as a potential focus of dissent Balogh stayed away from any direct involvement in the Hungarian Revolution of 1956.
