= Hungarian Radical Party =

Defunct political party in Hungary

Hungarian Radical Party Magyar Radikális Párt
- First leader: Imre Csécsy
- Last leader: Mihály Rózsa
- Founded: 3 March 1945 (1st); 3 March 1989 (2nd)
- Dissolved: 1949 (officially existed) (1st); 21 October 1998 (2nd)
- Newspaper: Haladás
- Ideology: Radicalism
- Political position: Centre-left

The Hungarian Radical Party (Hungarian: Magyar Radikális Párt, MRP) was a political party in Hungary in the period after World War II. The party was revived after the end of communism in 1989–90, but remained unsuccessful.

== History ==
The party was founded in November 1944 by Imre Csécsy, although it was not organised properly until the spring of 1945. In the parliamentary elections that year it received just 0.1% of the vote, failing to win a seat. The 1947 elections saw the party increase its vote share to 1.7%, winning six seats.

Prior to the 1949 elections it was forced to join the Communist-led Hungarian Independent People's Front. The Front ran a single list chosen by the Hungarian Working People's Party, with MRP members winning four seats. Following the elections the party ceased to function, although was not officially dissolved.

== Parliamentary elections ==
Election	Votes	%	Seats	+/–	Status
1945	5,763	0.12% (#6)	0 / 409	–	Extra-parliamentary
1947	85,535	1.71% (#8)	6 / 411	▲6	In opposition
1949	Part of the MFN		4 / 402	▼2	In government
