= Civic Democratic Party (Hungary) =

Civic Democratic Party Polgári Demokrata Párt
- Abbreviation: PDP
- Founder: Géza Teleki
- Founded: 1944
- Dissolved: 1949 (banned)
- Preceded by: Civic Freedom Party
- Ideology: Liberalism; Radicalism; Western-style democracy Parliamentarianism
- Political position: Centre-left

The Civic Democratic Party (Hungarian: Polgári Demokrata Párt, PDP) was a liberal political party in Hungary in the period following World War II

== History ==
The party was established towards the end of 1944 as a successor to the Civic Freedom Party. Part of a group of members who had belonged to now-defunct conservative parties before the war, Géza Teleki was elected as the party's first leader. The PDP won 21 seats in the National Interim Assembly elections in November 1944. However, Communist opposition to Teleki led to him losing his place in the Cabinet, and he resigned as party leader in June 1945.

Although the PDP was ostracised by left-wing parties in the buildup to the November 1945 elections, it still had around 60,000 members, whilst its Világ newspaper had a circulation of around 80,000. In the elections the party won two seats, taken by Sándor Szent-Iványi and women's rights campaigner Margit Slachta. However, Slachta left the party in January 1946 to sit as an independent.

In the 1947 elections the party won three seats. Prior to the 1949 elections several parties were forcibly merged into the Communist-led Hungarian Independence People's Front, whilst the PDP was banned.
