= Hungarian Independence Party =

- Leader: Zoltán Pfeiffer (1947); Tibor Hornyák (1956, 1989–90)
- Founded: 28 July 1947; 1 November 1956; 2 April 1989
- Dissolved: 20 November 1947; 4 November 1956

The Hungarian Independence Party (Hungarian: Magyar Függetlenségi Párt, MFP) was a political party in Hungary in the period after World War II.

== History ==
The party was founded in 1947, shortly before the August parliamentary elections that year. It was generally considered a successor of the banned Hungarian Freedom Party led by Dezső Sulyok, who had been forced into exile that summer. Led by Zoltán Pfeiffer, it won 49 of the 411 seats, becoming the fifth largest party in Parliament. However, in October the National Elections Committee ruled that the party had participated in the election unlawfully, and its seats were annulled.

A new party was established following the end of Communism. In the 1990 parliamentary elections it received less than 0.1% of the vote, and did not run again.
