= Péter Veres (politician) =

Hungarian politician and writer

Minister of Defence of Hungary
- In office 24 September 1947 – 9 September 1948
- Prime Minister: Lajos Dinnyés
- Preceded by: Lajos Dinnyés
- Succeeded by: Mihály Farkas

Personal details
- Born: 6 January 1897 Balmazújváros, Hajdú County, Kingdom of Hungary
- Died: 16 April 1970 (aged 73) Budapest, Hungary
- Party: Hungarian Social Democratic Party; National Peasant Party; Hungarian Socialist Workers' Party
- Spouse: Julianna Nádasdi
- Children: 5
- Profession: writer, politician

Péter Veres (6 January 1897 – 16 April 1970) was a Hungarian politician and writer, who served as Minister of Defence from 1947 to 1948.

Political offices
| Preceded by Lajos Dinnyés | Minister of Defence; 1947–1948 | Succeeded by Mihály Farkas |
