= National Peasant Party (Hungary) =

National Peasant Party Nemzeti Parasztpárt
- First leader: Péter Veres
- Last leader: Károly Dobszay
- Founded: 29 June 1939 (1st) 31 October 1956 (2nd) 11 June 1989 (3rd)
- Dissolved: 1949 (officially existed) (1st) 4 November 1956 (2nd) 15 June 1998 (3rd)
- Newspaper: Szabad Szó
- Ideology: Agrarianism; Agrarian socialism Left-wing populism Anti-capitalism; Hungarian nationalism Anti-German sentiment Factions: Anti-Sovietism
- Political position: Left-wing

Party flag

The National Peasant Party (Nemzeti Parasztpárt, NPP) was a political party in Hungary between 1939 and 1949. It was led by the writer Péter Veres. The party was revived for a short time during the Hungarian Revolution of 1956 and after the end of communism in 1989–90.

== History ==
The party was established in 1939, but was only formalised as an organisation on 19 September 1944. It won 42 seats in the National Interim Assembly elections in 1944. By the following year it had 170,000 members, although it was reduced to 23 seats in the parliamentary elections that year. However, the following year the party won 36 of the 411 seats in the parliamentary elections.

For the 1949 elections it ran as part of the Communist-led Hungarian Independent People's Front, winning 39 seats. The adoption of a new constitution in August 1949 saw the country became a one-party state, with the NPP being merged into the Communist-led Hungarian Working People's Party.

Following the Hungarian Revolution of 1956, the party was revived under the name Petőfi Party and served in the short-lived new government. During the transition to democracy (1989–90), members of the Péter Veres Society re-established the party under the name Hungarian People's Party (MNP) on 11 June 1989 and participated in the Opposition Round Table Talks. The MNP had high hopes regarding the first democratic elections in 1990, however they received only 0.8% of the vote. After that the presidium took the name of Hungarian People's Party–National Peasant Party. Shortly before the 1994 parliamentary elections, two-thirds of the membership joined the National Democratic Alliance (NDSZ) led by Zoltán Bíró and Imre Pozsgay. The MNP–NPP was wiped out by the end of the decade.

== Ideology ==
The party's main policy was land reform. It attracted support from the middle and lower classes in the countryside, as well as intellectuals in the provinces, and was most popular in eastern Hungary. It was sponsored by the Communist Party, as the Communists could attract only small support amongst rural voters. Its supporter base was sympathizing with the Hungarian Communist Party, with some of its leaders, including Ferenc Erdei and József Darvas, being closet communists.

== Election results ==
=== National Assembly ===
Election	Votes	%	Seats	+/–	Status
1944	–	–	42 / 498		Government
1945	324,772	6.87	23 / 409	▼19	Government
1947	413,409	8.28	36 / 411	▲13	Government
1949	Part of the MFN		39 / 402	▲3	Government
1990	37,047	0.75	0 / 386		Extra-parliamentary
