= Hungarian Communist Party =

Far-left political party in Hungary (1918–48)

Party of Communists in Hungary (1918–1919; 1922–1943) Socialist Party of Hungary (1919) Party of Socialist Communist Workers in Hungary (1919) Peace Party (1943–1944) Hungarian Communist Party (1944–1948)
- Logo between 1944 and 1948
- First leader: Béla Kun
- Last leader: Mátyás Rákosi
- Founded: 24 November 1918
- Dissolved: 22 July 1948
- Merged into: MDP
- Ideology: Communism; Marxism–Leninism; Stalinism
- Political position: Far-left
- National affiliation: Left Bloc
- International affiliation: Comintern (1919–1943); Cominform (1947–1948)
- Colors: Red

Party flag

The Hungarian Communist Party (Hungarian: Magyar Kommunista Párt, pronounced [ˈmɒɟɒr ˈkomːuniʃtɒ ˈpaːrt], abbr. MKP), known earlier as the Party of Communists in Hungary (Hungarian: Kommunisták Magyarországi Pártja, pronounced [ˈkomːuniʃtaːk ˈmɒɟɒrorsaːɡi ˈpaːrcɒ], abbr. KMP), was a Marxist-Leninist and Stalinist political party in Hungary that existed during the interwar period and briefly after World War II.

It was founded on November 24, 1918, as Party of Communists in Hungary, and was in power between March and August 1919 when Béla Kun ran the short-lived Hungarian Soviet Republic. The communist government was later overthrown by the Romanian Army, Kun was exiled to Vienna and later he and many other communists moved to Moscow. During those years, membership was becoming smaller every year. During World War II the party changed its name to the Peace Party, but only a year later in 1944, they embraced a new name which they would hold until 1948. After the war, they regained power, and their membership rose up quickly, which led to Mátyás Rákosi suppressing other parties in the country besides the social democrats (which were aligned with them) to form a one-party state. In 1948, the party merged with the social democrats to form the Hungarian Working People's Party which became the next ruling party of Hungary. It was also a member of Comintern and its successor Cominform.

== Foundation and early years ==
Logo of the Party of Communists in Hungary

The Communist Party of Hungary (KMP) was first established as The Party of Communists in Hungary in late 1918 by Béla Kun, a former journalist who fought for Austria-Hungary in World War I. After spending time in a Russian POW camp, Kun, along with several associates, set up the initial workings of the KMP in the downtown of Moscow in October 1918. These first members returned to Hungary in November, and on the 24th officially created the KMP. The Communist Party chose "The Party of Communists in Hungary" (Hungarian: Kommunisták Magyarországi Pártja) as its name, instead of "Hungarian Communist Party", since the vast majority of its represented social class, the factory workers, still did not have ethnic Hungarian roots in Budapest, and ethnic Hungarians were only a minority in the newly founded party. Initially, the group was small in number and boasted only its founders and a handful of leftist Social Democrats. Nonetheless, the political instability of the government under Mihály Károlyi and the growing popularity of the Bolshevik movement prompted the Social Democrats to seek a coalition with the KMP. For the Social Democrats, an alliance with the KMP not only increased its standing with the common people but also gave it a potential link to the increasingly powerful Russian Communist Party, as Kun had ties with prominent Russian Bolsheviks.

After the establishment of the Hungarian Soviet Republic in March 1919, Kun set about nationalising private industry while embarking on a massive agricultural collectivization project. He also took steps towards normalising foreign relations with the Triple Entente powers in an effort to gain back some of the land that Hungary was set to lose in the postwar negotiations. For the 133 days that the Hungarian Soviet Republic existed, the KMP concentrated mostly on trying to fix the widespread economic chaos that had resulted from Hungary's defeat in World War I. Unfortunately, Kun's economic policy created higher inflation and led to food shortages across the land. Opposition began to grow, led by Miklós Horthy, and in June, an attempted coup made the KMP launch a violent terror campaign through its secret police. The Soviet Republic fell on August 1, 1919, after the Hungarian Army's crushing defeat by Romania. The invading Romanians seized Budapest from the Communists, exiled Kun to Vienna and forced the KMP to hand over power to the Social Democrats.

== Interwar period and exile ==
The fall of the Soviet Republic was followed by a year-long anticommunist purge, known as the White Terror, by the new nationalist government under István Bethlen in which anywhere from 1,000 to 5,000 people were killed, and thousands more were imprisoned and tortured. Much of the old KMP leadership was executed or exiled, primarily to Vienna. There, remnants of the KMP Central Committee, once again led by Kun, reformed into a Provisional Central Committee, which attempted to keep the party together despite its illegal status in Hungary.

Throughout the 1920s, many Hungarian Communists moved to Moscow, with Kun among them. Kun's actions in Russia, most notably the organization of a massacre of White Russian prisoners-of-war in 1921, drew censure from the Soviet leader Vladimir Lenin and other prominent Bolsheviks. Nonetheless, Kun maintained a prominent position with Comintern until 1937, when he was arrested and executed during one of Joseph Stalin’s purges. Furthermore, Kun was the unquestioned leader of the KMP during the interwar period, with his main rival, Jenő Landler, dying in 1927.

The party also organised a legal cover party, the Socialist Workers Party of Hungary (MSzMP), to act as its representative in Hungary. However, the Hungarian government soon took steps to abolish the MSzMP, and by 1927, the party existed in name only.

For the remainder of the interwar period, the internal leadership of the KMP beyond Kun fluctuated tremendously, and membership was minuscule. After the deadly derailment of a passenger train at Biatorbágy by Szilveszter Matuska in 1931, the government declared martial law and used the opportunity to arrest suspected communists. Two of those arrested, and the leading party members Imré Sallai and Sándor Fürst, were executed the following year. The KMP was damaged to the point that the Comintern dissolved it in 1936.

Further throwing the communists into disarray were the inconsistent policies of the Comintern throughout the 1930s, which culminated in the 1939 Soviet-German Non-Aggression Pact and the abandonment of the Popular Front tactic, which had marked communist ideology for the last decade. Besides, Stalin's purges in the late 1930s had taken a heavy toll on the Hungarian émigrés in Moscow.

== World War II and Communist takeover ==
The KMP entered the 1940s a shell of what it once was. In late 1941, following Germany's invasion of the Soviet Union, the Central Committee advised Party members to work with non-Communist resistance groups in order to present a united anti-German front. This prompted the KMP to attempt to re-establish itself as a legal entity in Hungary, despite the Horthy's government's alliance with Nazi Germany. This movement was quickly put to an end, however, as mass arrests in 1942 effectively destroyed the leadership of the KMP. This, coupled with the dissolution of Comintern in 1943, spelled the end of the KMP as a functioning party for the time being.

In an effort to continue their actions, Hungarian Communists under János Kádár founded a new party, dubbed the Peace Party, as a replacement for the KMP. This designation lasted until late 1944, at which point the Peace Party reverted to its designation as the Communist Party. By this point, Horthy was frantically trying to end Hungary's role in the war. Attempts to scale back the involvement on the German end failed, and so, with the Red Army approaching the country's borders, Horthy tried to declare Hungary a neutral state. The move backfired horrendously; the Arrow Cross Party forces seized the capital, took power, and set the stage for a four-month battle that claimed thousands of lives and left Budapest in ruins. The city was finally liberated in February 1945.

Despite rapid growth in membership immediately following the war, the party refounded under the name MKP received 17 percent in the elections, equal to the Hungarian Social Democratic Party. But the appointment of party secretary László Rajk as Minister of the Interior, coupled with the presence of the Red Army in the country and strong support for the MKP within other parties, allowed the Hungarian Communists time to whittle away their political opponents. Party leader Mátyás Rákosi implemented a strategy of pressuring the non-Communist parties to gradually push out their more courageous elements as "fascists" or fascist sympathizers, a strategy he later called salami tactics.

Within two years, the MKP had broken the power base of the Independent Smallholders Party (FKGP), the majority party in the new government, and by 1948, every party but the Social Democrats had either vanished or taken over by fellow travelers willing to do the Communists' bidding. The Social Democrats were eliminated in 1948 by a forced merger with the Communists in June 1948 which formed the Hungarian Working People's Party (MDP). However, the few independent-minded Social Democrats were quickly shunted aside, leaving the MDP as essentially the MKP under a new name. In 1949, elections were held in which voters were presented with a single list from the Communist-controlled Independent Democratic Front.

== Electoral history ==
=== Diet Elections ===
Election date	Leader	Number of seats	Alliance	Rank
1944	Mátyás Rákosi	166 / 498	FKGP–MKP–MSZDP–NPP–PDP	1st
1945	Mátyás Rákosi	70 / 409	FKGP–MKP–MSZDP–NPP	3rd
1947	Mátyás Rákosi	100 / 411	FKGP–MKP–MSZDP–NPP	1st

== Leaders ==
- Béla Kun (1918–1936)
- János Kádár (1943–1944)
- Mátyás Rákosi (1944–1948)

== Prominent members ==
- Ernő Gerő
- Béla Kun
- Imre Nagy
- József Pogány
- László Rajk
- Mátyás Rákosi
- László Rudas
- Tibor Szamuely
- Ilona Duczynska

== See also ==
- Hungarian Socialist Workers' Party
- History of Hungary
- Hungarian People's Republic

== Bibliography ==
- Crampton, R.J. Eastern Europe in the Twentieth Century - And After, 2nd Ed. Routledge Press, 1994.
- Kenez, Peter Hungary from the Nazis to the Soviets: The Establishment of the Communist Regime in Hungary, 1944-1948, Cambridge University Press, 2006
- Kovrig, Bennett. Communism in Hungary: From Kun to Kadar. Hoover Institution Press. Stanford, 1979
- Molnár, Miklós From Béla Kun to János Kádár: Seventy Years of Hungarian Communism, Berg Publishers, 1990
