= Kingdom of Hungary (1920–1946) =

Hungary under Miklós Horthy

Coordinates: 47°29′54″N 19°02′25″E

Kingdom of Hungary Magyar Királyság
- 1920–1946
- Flag Coat of arms
- Motto: Regnum Mariae Patrona Hungariae (Latin) ("Kingdom of Mary, the Patron of Hungary")
- Anthem: Himnusz (English: "Hymn")
- The Kingdom of Hungary in 1942
- Capital and largest city: Budapest
- Official languages: Hungarian
- Recognized regional languages: Rusyn (in Subcarpathia)
- Spoken: Romanian • German • Slovak • Croatian • Serbian • Yiddish • Slovenian • Romani
- Ethnic groups (1941): List: Hungarians (80.9%); Romanians (7.2%); Rusyns (3.7%); Germans (3.6%); Slovaks (1.2%); Serbs (1.1%); Jews (1%); Croats (0.5%); Roma (0.5%); Slovenes (0.1%); Others (0.2%)
- Religion (1941): List: Roman Catholicism (55%); Calvinism (19%); Eastern Orthodoxy (11.6%); Lutheranism (5%); Judaism (4.9%); Eastern Catholicism (3.8%); Others (0.7%)
- Demonym: Hungarian
- Government: Authoritarian regency (1920–1944); Totalitarian state (1944–1945); Transitional government (1945–1946, occupation zone from 1944 to 1945)
- King
  - 1920–1946: Vacant (Note: Claimed by former King Charles IV of Hungary in 1921, who died the following year.)
- Head of state
  - 1920–1944: Miklós Horthy (Note: Miklós Horthy used the title "Regent".)
  - 1944–1945: Ferenc Szálasi (Note: Ferenc Szálasi used the title "Nation Leader".)
  - 1945–1946: High National Council (Note: Ruled as a collective head of state.)
- Prime minister
  - 1920 (first): Károly Huszár
  - 1945–1946 (last): Zoltán Tildy
- Legislature: Diet
  - Upper: Felsőház
  - Lower: Képviselőház
- Historical era: Interwar · World War II
  - Monarchy restored: 29 February 1920
  - Treaty of Trianon: 4 June 1920
  - Easter Crisis: 26 March 1921
  - March on Budapest: 21 October 1921
  - 1st Vienna Award: 2 November 1938
  - Invasion of Subcarpathia: 14 March 1939
  - 2nd Vienna Award: 30 August 1940
  - Invasion of Yugoslavia: 11 April 1941
  - Invasion of the USSR: 27 June 1941
  - German occupation: 19 March 1944
  - Hungarist takeover: 16 October 1944
  - Monarchy abolished: 1 February 1946

Area
- 1920: 92,833 km^{2} (35,843 sq mi)
- 1930: 93,073 km^{2} (35,936 sq mi)
- 1941: 172,149 km^{2} (66,467 sq mi)

Population
  - 1920: 7,980,143
  - 1930: 8,688,319
  - 1941: 14,669,100
- Currency: Hungarian korona (1920–1927) Hungarian pengő (1927–1946)
- Time zone: UTC+1 (CET)
  - Summer (DST): UTC+2 (CEST)
- (Note: Observed in 1920 and 1941–1946.)
Preceded by	Succeeded by
Hungarian Republic	Second Hungarian Republic
- Today part of: Hungary; Romania; Serbia; Croatia; Slovenia; Ukraine; Slovakia

The Kingdom of Hungary, (Note: Hungarian: Magyar Királyság; [ˈmɒɟɒr ˈkiraːjʃaːɡ]) referred to retrospectively as the Regency (Note: The system of government and state structure of Hungary between 1920 and 1944 is referred to as a 'regency') and the Horthy era, (Note: The term "monarchy without a king” was questioned if it should be used for describing the form of the Hungarian state during the Horthy era.) existed as a country from 1920 to 1946 (Note: The Allied powers generally did not recognize territorial evolutions of the Axis powers after the outbreak of World War II; however, this was not applied in all the cases after the end of the war. De jure, generally the Axis powers recognized the territorial evolutions of its powers. Special exceptions − also concerning non-belligerent parties − may have been possible.) under the rule of Miklós Horthy, Regent of Hungary, who officially represented the Hungarian monarchy. In reality there was no king, and attempts by King Charles IV to return to the throne shortly before his death were prevented by Horthy.

Hungary under Horthy was characterized by its conservative, nationalist, and fiercely anti-communist character; some historians have described this system as para-fascist. The government was based on an unstable alliance of conservatives and right-wingers. Foreign policy was characterized by revisionism: the total or partial revision of the 1920 Treaty of Trianon, which resulted in the loss of 72% of Hungary's historical territory, 58% of its population, 32% of its ethnic Hungarian population, and much of its economic resources and industrial capacity. As a consequence, more than three million ethnic Hungarians found themselves outside the country's new borders, primarily in territories transferred to the Kingdom of Romania and the newly created states of Czechoslovakia and the Kingdom of Serbs, Croats and Slovenes (Yugoslavia). A significant Hungarian population also remained in Székely Land, within the greatly enlarged Romania. Republican Austria, the successor of the former other half of the dual monarchy also received some minor territory from Hungary. Thus the post-1918 kingdom can be described as a rump state. Hungary's interwar politics were dominated by a focus on the territorial losses suffered from this treaty, with the resentment continuing until the present.

Society in the Kingdom of Hungary was sharply divided. Budapest and other cities had a standard of living close to that of Western Europe, while most of the countryside was very poor and many rural people could not read. A small nobility owned most of the land, and social rank mattered a great deal. The regime promoted conservative Christian values and opposed liberalism, socialism and modernity, although art and literature still flourished in Budapest despite censorship. After the Treaty of Trianon, a bloated civil service and fierce competition for middle-class jobs fed antisemitism. Jews, about 6% of the population but prominent in business and the professions, faced restrictions such as the 1920 numerus clausus law on university places, and in 1944 many were rounded up and deported to their deaths. Romani people also faced discrimination, forced labour from 1941 and killings under the Arrow Cross.

Nazi Germany's influence in Hungary has led some historians to conclude that the country increasingly became a client state after 1938. The Kingdom of Hungary was an Axis power during World War II, intent on regaining Hungarian-majority territory that had been lost in the Treaty of Trianon, which it mostly did in early 1941 after the First and Second Vienna Awards and after joining the German invasion of Yugoslavia. By 1944, following heavy setbacks for the Axis, Horthy's government negotiated secretly with the Allies, and also considered leaving the war. Because of this Hungary was occupied by Germany and Horthy was deposed. The extremist Arrow Cross Party's leader Ferenc Szálasi established a new Nazi-backed government, effectively turning Hungary into a German-occupied puppet state. As the Soviet Union reached Hungary, its anti-fascist parties found it possible to create a counter-government which sided with the Soviet Union in the last months of the war and began progressive reforms and the transition towards a republic.

After World War II, the country fell within the Soviet Union's sphere of influence. It changed its name to the Hungarian State (Hungarian: Magyar Állam) and the Second Hungarian Republic was soon thereafter proclaimed in 1946, succeeded by the communist Hungarian People's Republic in 1949.

== Formation ==
Upon the dissolution of Austria-Hungary after World War I, the Hungarian Democratic Republic and then the Hungarian Soviet Republic were briefly proclaimed in 1918 and 1919, respectively. The short-lived communist government of Béla Kun launched what was known as the "Red Terror", involving Hungary in an ill-fated war with Romania. In 1920, the country fell into a period of civil conflict, with Hungarian anti-communists and monarchists violently purging the communists, leftist intellectuals, and others whom they felt threatened by, especially Jews. This period was known as the "White Terror". In 1920, after the pullout of the last of the Romanian occupation forces, the Kingdom of Hungary was restored.

After the collapse of the short-lived Communist regime, according to historian István Deák:

Between 1919 and 1944 Hungary was a rightist country. Forged out of a counter-revolutionary heritage, its governments advocated a "nationalist Christian" policy; they extolled heroism, faith, and unity; they despised the French Revolution, and they spurned the liberal and socialist ideologies of the 19th century. The governments saw Hungary as a bulwark against Bolshevism and Bolshevism's alleged "instruments": Socialism, Cosmopolitanism, and Freemasonry. They perpetrated the rule of a small clique of aristocrats, civil servants, and army officers, and surrounded with adulation the head of the state, the counterrevolutionary Admiral Horthy.

== Regency ==
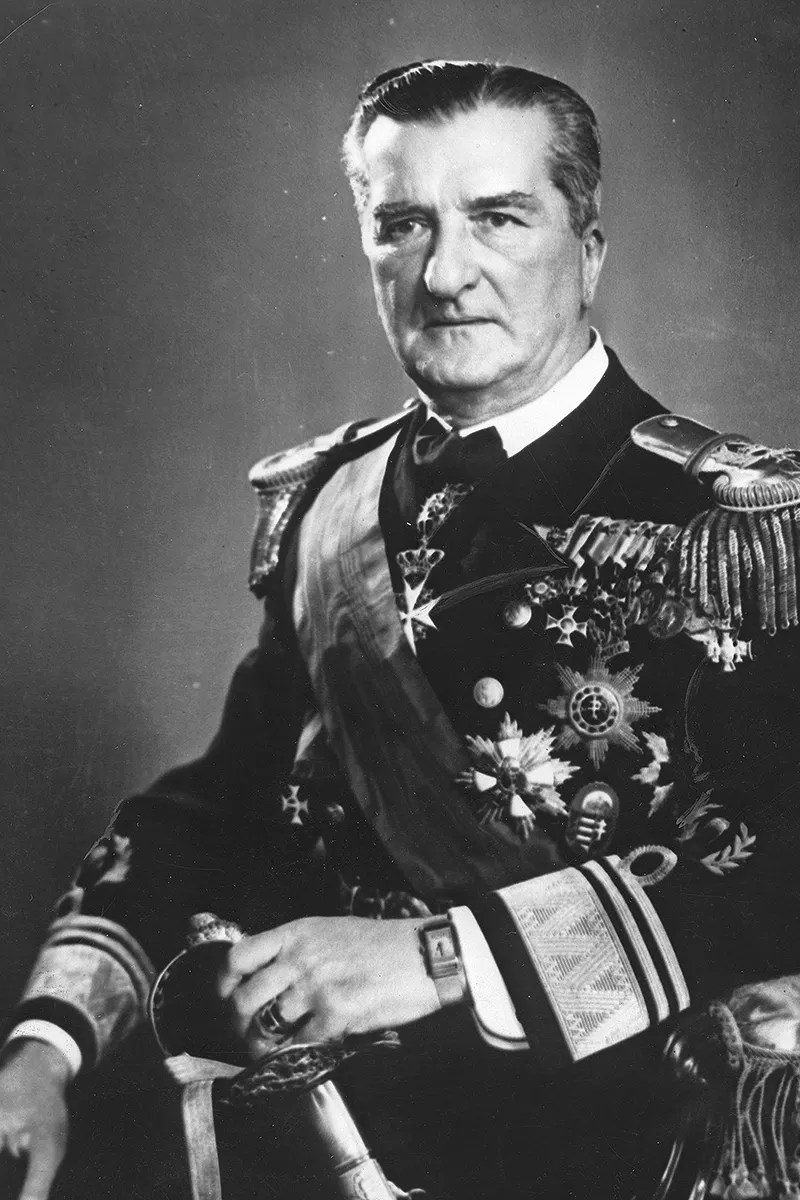
Miklós Horthy, Regent of Hungary

On 29 February 1920, a coalition of right-wing political forces united and returned Hungary to being a constitutional monarchy. However, it was obvious that the Allies would not accept any return of the Habsburgs. Earlier, Archduke Joseph August had declared himself regent, but he stood down after two weeks when the Allies refused to recognize him.

It was thus decided to choose a regent to represent the monarchy until a settlement could be reached. Miklós Horthy, the last commanding admiral of the Austro-Hungarian Navy, was chosen for this position on 1 March. Sándor Simonyi-Semadam was the first prime minister of Horthy's regency.

In 1921 Charles returned in Hungary and tried to retake its throne, even trying to march on Budapest with some rebel troops in October 1921; however, his attempts failed as much of the Royal Hungarian Army remained loyal to Horthy and thus Charles was arrested and exiled to Madeira.

On 6 November 1921 the Diet of Hungary passed a law nullifying the Pragmatic Sanction of 1713, dethroning Charles IV and abolishing the House of Habsburg's rights to the throne of Hungary. Hungary was a kingdom without royalty. With civil unrest too great to select a new king, it was decided to confirm Horthy as Regent of Hungary. He remained in that powerful president-like status until he was overthrown in 1944.

== Government ==
Standard of the Regent of Hungary

Horthy's rule as Regent possessed characteristics such that it could be construed a dictatorship. As a counterpoint, his powers were a continuation of the constitutional powers of the King of Hungary, adopted earlier during the federation with the Austrian Empire.

As Regent, Horthy had the power to adjourn or dissolve the Hungarian Diet (parliament) at his own discretion; he appointed the Hungarian prime minister. Horthy’s powers were similar to those of an enlightened absolute monarch.

The succession after Horthy's death or resignation was never officially established; presumably the Hungarian Parliament would have selected a new regent, or possibly attempted to restore the Habsburgs under Crown Prince Otto. In January 1942, Parliament appointed Horthy's eldest son István as Deputy Regent and expected successor. Whether this represents an attempt to gradually re-establish monarchy in Hungary is unclear; at any rate, István was killed in an airplane crash in August that year, and a new Deputy Regent was not appointed.

During his first ten years, Horthy led increased repression of Hungarian minorities. In 1920, the numerus clausus law formally placed limits on the number of minority students at university, and legalized corporal punishment for adults in criminal cases. Although the law seemingly applied in equal measure to all minorities, the ethnicity quota system was never fully introduced and the law acted largely to conceal anti-Jewish action from foreign observers. Limitations were relaxed in 1928. Racial criteria in admitting new students were removed and replaced by social criteria. Five categories were set up: civil servants, war veterans and army officers, small landowners and artisans, industrialists, and the merchant classes. Under István Bethlen as prime minister the electoral system was changed to reintroduce an open vote system outside Budapest and its vicinity and cities with county municipal rights. Bethlen's political party, the Party of Unity, won repeated elections. Bethlen pushed for revision of the Treaty of Trianon. After the collapse of the Hungarian economy from 1929 to 1931, national turmoil pushed Bethlen to resign as prime minister. In 1938 the changes to the electoral system were reversed.

Social conditions in the kingdom did not improve as time passed, as a very small proportion of the population continued to control much of the country's wealth. Jews were continually pressured to assimilate into Hungarian mainstream culture. The desperate situation forced the Regent, Horthy, to accept the far-right politician Gyula Gömbös as prime minister. He pledged to retain the existing political system. Gömbös agreed to abandon his extreme antisemitism and allow some Jews into the government.

In power, Gömbös moved Hungary towards a one-party government like those of Fascist Italy and Nazi Germany. Pressure by Nazi Germany for extreme antisemitism forced Gömbös out and Hungary pursued antisemitism under its "Jewish Laws". Initially, the government passed laws restricting Jews to 20 percent in a number of professions. Later it scapegoated the Jews for the country's failing economy.

In March 1944, responding to the advancing Soviet forces, Prime Minister Miklós Kállay, with Horthy's backing, established contacts with the Allies in order to open negotiations and switch sides; however, this became known to the Germans, who proceeded to invade Hungary and quickly overran the country, meeting only limited resistance. With the country now under German occupation, Horthy was forced to remove Kállay from his position and appoint pro-Nazi politician Döme Sztójay as the new prime minister. Sztójay legalized the antisemitic and pro-Nazi Arrow Cross Party, deported large numbers of Hungarian Jews to Germany and initiated a violent crackdown on liberal and leftist opposition.

As the months went by, Horthy became increasingly appalled by Sztójay's brutal methods and alarmed by the rapidly collapsing Eastern Front. In August 1944, he deposed the pro-German prime minister and installed a more balanced government led by Géza Lakatos, in an effort to engage with the Allies and avoid occupation by the Soviet Union. This did not sit well with Hitler and, in October, German forces overthrew Horthy and Lakatos and installed a puppet regime led by Ferenc Szálasi of the Arrow Cross Party. The Arrow Cross Party never abolished the monarchy as a form of government, and Hungarian newspapers continued to refer to the country as the Kingdom of Hungary (Magyar Királyság), although Magyarország (Hungary) was used as an alternative. From May to June 1944, Hungarian authorities rapidly rounded up and transported hundreds of thousands of Hungarian Jews to Nazi concentration camps, where most died.

After the fall of the Szálasi regime, a Soviet-backed government under Béla Miklós was nominally left in control of the entire country. A High National Council was appointed in January to assume the regency, and included members of the Hungarian Communist Party, like Ernő Gerő, and later Mátyás Rákosi and László Rajk.

== Economy ==
Upon the kingdom's establishment soon after World War I, the country suffered from economic decline, budget deficits, and high inflation as a result of the loss of economically important territories under the Treaty of Trianon, including to Czechoslovakia, Romania, and Yugoslavia. The land losses of the Treaty of Trianon in 1920 caused Hungary to lose agricultural and industrial areas, making it dependent on exporting products from what agricultural land it had left to maintain its economy. Prime Minister István Bethlen's government dealt with the economic crisis by seeking large foreign loans, which allowed the country to achieve monetary stabilization in the early 1920s. He introduced a new currency in 1927, the pengő. Industrial and farm production rose rapidly, and the country benefited from flourishing foreign trade during most of the 1920s.

Following the start of the Great Depression in 1929, the prosperity rapidly collapsed in the country, especially in part due to the economic effects of the failure of the Österreichische Creditanstalt bank in Vienna, Austria. From the mid-1930s to the 1940s, after relations improved with Germany, Hungary's economy benefited from trade. The Hungarian economy became dependent on that of Germany.

== Society ==
Hungary in the interwar era was divided sharply into essentially two worlds. Budapest and the other cities had a standard of living roughly equal to that of Western Europe and North America while the countryside was extremely poor and backward. Budapest was a modern city that served as a center of manufacturing for Eastern Europe. The Hungarian historian István Deák wrote: "Budapest remained a most sophisticated place in a much poorer and less developed countryside". There was a major cultural divide between Budapest and the rest of the country. The Horthy regime took ultra-conservative Christian positions, declaring itself to be implacably opposed to liberalism, communism, socialism, Judaism, freemasonry, secularism, divorce, feminism, homosexuality, abortion, the artistic avant-garde and modernity in general, but Deák noted that the "sinful" activities the regime was opposed to flourished in Budapest for most of the Horthy era. Deák described the Horthy era as "a golden age of literature and art" despite the strict censorship. The regime glorified the countryside and the past while in Budapest many intellectuals created modernistic art and literature that was out of step with the regime's ideology. The majority of the land in rural areas was owned by the nobility, who were in turn divided into the greater nobility with titles and the lesser nobility without titles. The lesser nobility corresponded to the gentry in England and were referred to as such by outsiders. Hungarian society was semi-feudal in nature and status was all important. It was expected to address socially superior people by forms of address such as Your Excellency, Your Dignity, Your Greatness and Your Authority depending upon their social rank. Hungarian society was extremely status conscious and people with high incomes tended to flaunt their wealth by wearing the most expensive clothing and jewelry possible; dining out frequently at equally expensive restaurants, night-clubs and cafes; and driving pricey automobiles. Both rich and middle class households routinely hired servants to do all of the household work as menial labour was considered to beneath a "gentleman" or a "lady".

The urban middle class was divided by religion. The Christian middle class worked as civil servants while the Jewish middle class served in business and the trades. To work as a tradesman, in business and the professions was considered to be a deeply shameful and dishonourable way of making a living, and the Christian middle classes tended to shun these jobs. In a society obsessed with status, to be a land-owning "gentleman" or a "lady" married to the said "gentleman" was felt to be the only honourable way of making a living, and because Jews by the virtue of their religion could never be regarded as a "gentleman" or a "lady", Jews made up a disproportionate number of the professions such as doctors, bankers, dentists, lawyers, engineers, businessmen, scientists and so on along with most of the tradesmen. The census of 1920 revealed that 6% of the Hungarian population was Jewish and that 69% of the Jews in Hungary were the owners of businesses or worked as the salaried employees of businesses, 14% worked as teachers or as professionals such as lawyers and doctors; and another 15% worked as tradesmen. The 1920 census also showed that 45% of all Hungarian Jews lived in Budapest where they owned 66% of the small businesses in that city, made up 90% of those who worked in banking and forms of finance, made up 56% of the salaried employees in factories, and consisted of 70% of those engaged in commence.

In the lands lost under the Treaty of Trianon, the Hungarian civil servants were not willing to serve the new states nor were the governments of Czechoslovakia, Yugoslavia and Romania were willing to employ Magyar civil servants. As a result, the civil servants in the lost lands relocated to the Kingdom of Hungary where the government gave all of them jobs, leading to a grotesquely bloated civil service. One result of the excess of civil servants was an unwillingness of the government to hire new civil servants freshly graduated from university, which forced many Christian middle class families to reluctantly consider having their sons and daughters major in fields that before World War One they would never had considered. The fact that Jews made up 6% of the population, but made up of the 50% of the medical students and 30% of the law students become a major issue with the charge being made that Hungarian Jews were blocking the Christian families from middle class jobs, leading to a sharp rise in antisemitism. In the fall of 1919, all the universities in Hungary were temporarily shut down following an outbreak of anti-Semitic rioting as Christian students prevented Jewish students from attending classes by beating them up. In 1920, the prime minister Pál Teleki passed the Numerus clausus law that limited the number of Jewish university students to 5%. In 1928, the prime minister István Bethlen liberalised the numerus clausus law by allowing Hungarian universities to accept as many Jewish applicants as they wanted. Beginning on 11 October 1932, Hungarian universities were rocked by anti-Semitic demonstrations with Christian students complaining that Jewish students made up a disproportionate number of the students in violation of the numerus clausus law. The protesting students complained that Jews made only 6% of the population of Hungary, but were 25% of the students at the University of Debrecen and made up 27% of the students at the medical school at Budapest University. The well organised demonstrations took place at every university in Hungary and were a recurring feature of university life until 1936. Both the prime minister Gyula Gömbös and the education minister Bálint Hóman came out in support of the demonstrations. Gömbös and Hóman restored the previous numerus clausus law along with imposing new quotas by requiring Jewish businesses to hire more Christian university graduates along with a Youth Saving Action programme designed to give Christian university graduates jobs. As a result, Jews went from being 14% of the freshmen students entering universities in the 1931-1932 academic year to being 4.6% of the first year students in the 1936-1937 academic year.

Before the First World War, Hungarian Jews were generally regarded as a "model minority" who during the course of 19th century had abandoned the Yiddish language and culture in favor of the Magyar language and culture. In the 19th century, most Hungarian Jews had embraced a Hungarian identity unlike the other minorities in the Kingdom of Hungary who had resisted the Magyarization campaign, which led for the Jews to be viewed as a "model minority" who wanted to be Magyars. After the First World War, most Hungarian Jews still saw themselves as Hungarians first and Jews second and the Hungarian Jewish community leaders throughout the Horthy era loyally supported the campaign of the Horthy regime against the Treaty of Trianon despite Horthy's antisemitism. The Jews of Transylvania supported the Hungarian claim to Transylvania and those Jews living in northern Transylvania welcomed the return to Hungarian rule in 1940, greeting the Honved as liberators from the anti-Semitic government of Romania. However, after the First World War Hungarian Jews were widely blamed for the defeat of 1918; the Aster Revolution, which toppled the ancient House of Habsburg; and for the Hungarian Soviet Republic, leading to a situation that was the precise inverse of the situation that had existed before 1914. The anti-Semitic mood led to Zionism, which had previously been a fringe movement in the Hungarian Jewish community, to acquire a following, through most Hungarian Jews continued to view Hungary as their homeland rather than a projected Jewish state in the Palestine Mandate (modern Israel). In northern Transylvania, there was a grim sequel to the Second Vienna Award of 1940 in the spring and summer of 1944 when the Jews who had welcomed the return to Hungarian rule were rewarded for their loyalty to Hungary by being rounded up by Hungarian gendarmes and policemen to be deported to the Auschwitz-Birkenau extermination camp; the vast majority were exterminated. By contrast, the Jews in southern Transylvania who also wanted a return to Hungarian rule survived the war because in 1942 King Michael vetoed the plans of Ion Antonescu to deport them to the extermination camps.

The majority of the rural population lived in dire poverty and were usually illiterate. The peasants often lived in isolated farms known as tanya. A typical description of the tanya world on the Alfölf (the Magyar term for the Great Hungarian Plain) was: "A half million souls live far from city and village in the Alfölf like cultural exiles. These are the people of the Alfölf tanya world. Living in areas with no roads-without schools, churches, doctors, pharmacies or any of the facilities of community life with no one to help them or protect them". Starting in the early 1930s, university students started what was known revealingly as the "village explorer" movement to research life in the countryside. Urban Hungarians tended to have a romantic view of life in the countryside and the reality of the level of rural poverty greatly shocked the "village explorers". The village of Kemse was the subject of one such study by the "village explorers" who published their research in the 1936 book Elsûllyedt falu a Dumántúlon (A Sinking Village in Transdanubia). The book revealed the abortion rate was extremely high in Kemse owning to the level of poverty as most peasants could not afford to raise more than one child despite the fact that the crude abortions often led to death or serious injuries. Count Kuno von Klebelsberg, the education minister in the government of prime minister István Bethlen was ordered by the prime minister to end illiteracy in Hungary and to improve the universities. Klebelsberg had the education ministry build 3, 500 new elementary schools in the rural areas of Hungary in an attempt to end illiteracy in the countryside, but even he was forced to admit that this was insufficient and the Hungarian state simply did not have the financial resources to build enough schools and hire enough teachers to end rural illiteracy at the present.

The writer Gyula Illyés in his 1936 book People of the Puszta described life in the puszta (the collection of servants dwellings in the middle of an estate). Illyés wrote that the servants "live under one roof in long, low, single-storey houses like slum tenements on the outskirts of a city...In morals, customs, outlook on life, and even in the way they walk and move their arms, they differ sharply from all other social strata. They live in utter isolation, more hidden away and cut off than any villagers. They work all day, Sundays included and in consequence hardly ever stir from the puszta...It is a world apart". The writer Imre Kovács travelled across the southern part of the Great Hungarian Plain in the summer of 1936 and documented his research in his book The Silent Revolution. Kovács noted that the three main churches of Hungary, namely the Roman Catholic Church, the Lutheran Church and the Reformed Church were indifferent to the rural poor who had abandoned mainstream Christianity in favor of esoteric sects, which was the silent revolution of the book's title. Kovács wrote: "The one-child syndrome, the sects, and the extreme muddled political movements are the hopeless experiences of an oppressed people...Sects are the harbingers of revolution, but good gentlemen, you don't have to fear: there will be no more peasant revolution in Hungary". The "village explorer" movement came under suspicion from the government, which viewed the concern of the students with rural poverty as being vaguely left-wing and the "village explorers" were often the subject of harassment from the Royal Hungarian Gendarmerie (which served as the police force in rural areas).

The Romani (Gypsies) largely continued their traditional nomadic lifestyle, wandering across Hungary in their caravans, selling tickets and engaging in metalwork and crafts. The popular belief that all of the Romani were criminals led to various proposals from "race experts" calling for a solution to the "Gypsy question" such as forcing them to settle down by confiscating their wagons, horses and tools along with plans to sterilise all Romani and to ban sex between Magyars and Romani. A newspaper article from 1931 about the "Gypsy question"-which was typical of the newspaper coverage of the issue-declared: "It is public knowledge that Gypsies are the biggest threat to public safety. Their low intelligence, nomadic life, evasion of regular work predestines them to criminality. I am convinced that if we succeeded in making them settled and assume regular work, [rates of] criminality country-wide would improve". The high sheriff of Vasvár county in a 1932 report to the lord lieutenant of the county declared that "a large number of Gypsy caravans" were arriving in the county, but complained that he lacked a sufficient number of gendarmes to drive them out. In 1933, the lord lieutenant for Ondód claimed that the "poverty and shocking reproduction" of the Romani threatened to ruin the town as he noted that most of the Romani arriving were "beggars" prone to having very large families owning to a tendency to marry young and a general lack of inhibitions about sex. The Romani had traditionally worked as traveling craftsmen, and the coming of industrialisation to Hungary along with the Great Depression drove them deeper into poverty, hence the recurring complaints about the Romani being beggars. In 1932, one Romani craftsman told a journalist: "We are nail-smiths, but nowadays our work is no longer needed. By working all day we make no more than one pengő. There is no construction, no one buys the good quality hand-wrought nails. If no one buys nails, we are unemployed."

The attempts by the authorities to have the Romani settle down and send their children to school were much resisted, which sometimes led to the gendarmes forcibly taking away Romani children from their parents in order to make them attend school. One teacher told a journalist in 1932 that he believed giving the Romani an education and teaching them proper hygiene would solve the "Gypsy question" through he admitted that the Romani children were "hard to tame". The purpose of the schools was as part of the Magyarization campaign, intended to have the Romani stop speaking Romany and speak Magyar as their first language, but in practice there was school segregation as Romani children were sent to different schools than the Magyar children. However, the Hungarian state could not afford to have schools for all of the peasants, and the educational campaign with the Romani failed as there was not enough money to build schools and hire teachers for all the Romani children. Much like the Jews, the Romani were considered to be "people unreliable in terms of national loyalty" and as such Romani men served in the much dreaded Labour Service battalions of the Honved from 1941 onward. The Israeli historian Katalin Katz noted that the Romani serving in the Labour Service existed at "the will of merciless and often sadistic officers" and the death rate in the Labour Service was very high. The Hungarian Romani suffered very badly under the rule of the Arrow Cross with a number of Romani bands being massacred by the Arrow Cross militia with the rest of the Romani community (including women and children) being conscripted into the Labour Service to build defensive lines to try to stop the advance of the Red Army. By the end of 1944, there were over 30 work camps for the Romani in Hungary were the inmates laboured under "inhumane conditions" while other Hungarian Romani were held at the Csillagerőd prison, from where they were deported to the Dachau and Bergen-Belsen concentration camps for the men and the Ravensbrück concentration camp for the women.

== Foreign policy ==
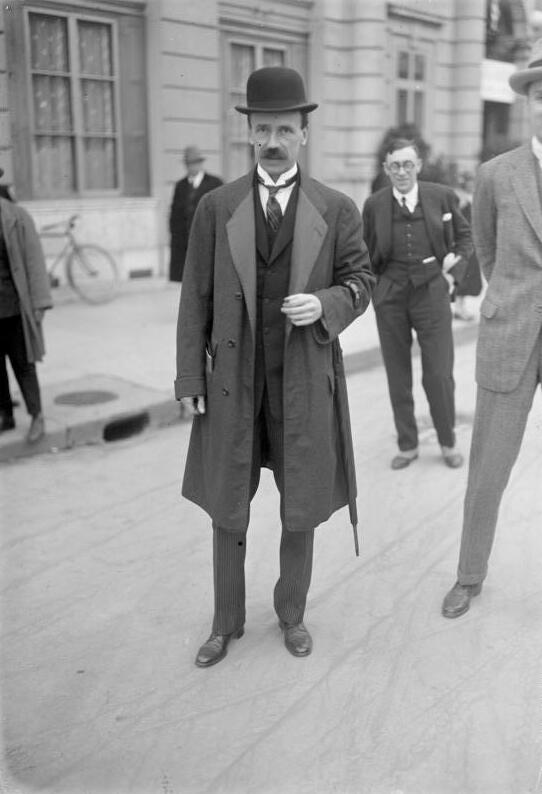
István Bethlen, Prime Minister of Hungary.

Initially, despite a move towards nationalism, the new state under Horthy, in an effort to prevent further conflicts, signed the Treaty of Trianon on 4 June 1920, thereby reducing Hungary's size substantially: the whole of Transylvania was taken by Romania; much of Upper Hungary became part of Czechoslovakia; Vojvodina was assigned to the Kingdom of Serbs, Croats, and Slovenes (known after 1929 as Yugoslavia); and the Free State of Fiume was created.

With a succession of increasingly nationalist prime ministers, Hungary steadily came to resent the Treaty of Trianon, and aligned itself with Europe's two fascist states, Germany and Italy, which both opposed the changes to national borders in Europe at the end of World War I. The Italian Fascist dictator Benito Mussolini sought closer ties with Hungary, beginning with the signing of a treaty of friendship between Hungary and Italy on 5 April 1927. Gyula Gömbös was an open admirer of the fascist leaders. Gömbös attempted to forge a closer trilateral unity between Germany, Italy and Hungary by acting as an intermediary between Germany and Italy, whose two fascist regimes had nearly come to conflict in 1934 over the issue of Austrian independence. Gömbös eventually persuaded Mussolini to accept Hitler's annexation of Austria in the late 1930s. Gömbös is said to have coined the phrase "axis", which he applied to his intention to create an alliance with Germany and Italy; those two countries used it to term their alliance as the Rome–Berlin axis. Just prior to the Second World War, Hungary benefited from its close ties with Germany and Italy when the Munich Agreement obliged Czechoslovakia and Hungary to settle their territorial disputes by negotiation. Finally, the First Vienna Award reassigned the southern parts of Czechoslovakia to Hungary, and shortly after Czechoslovakia was abolished Hungary occupied and annexed the remainder of the Carpatho-Ukraine.

== World War II ==
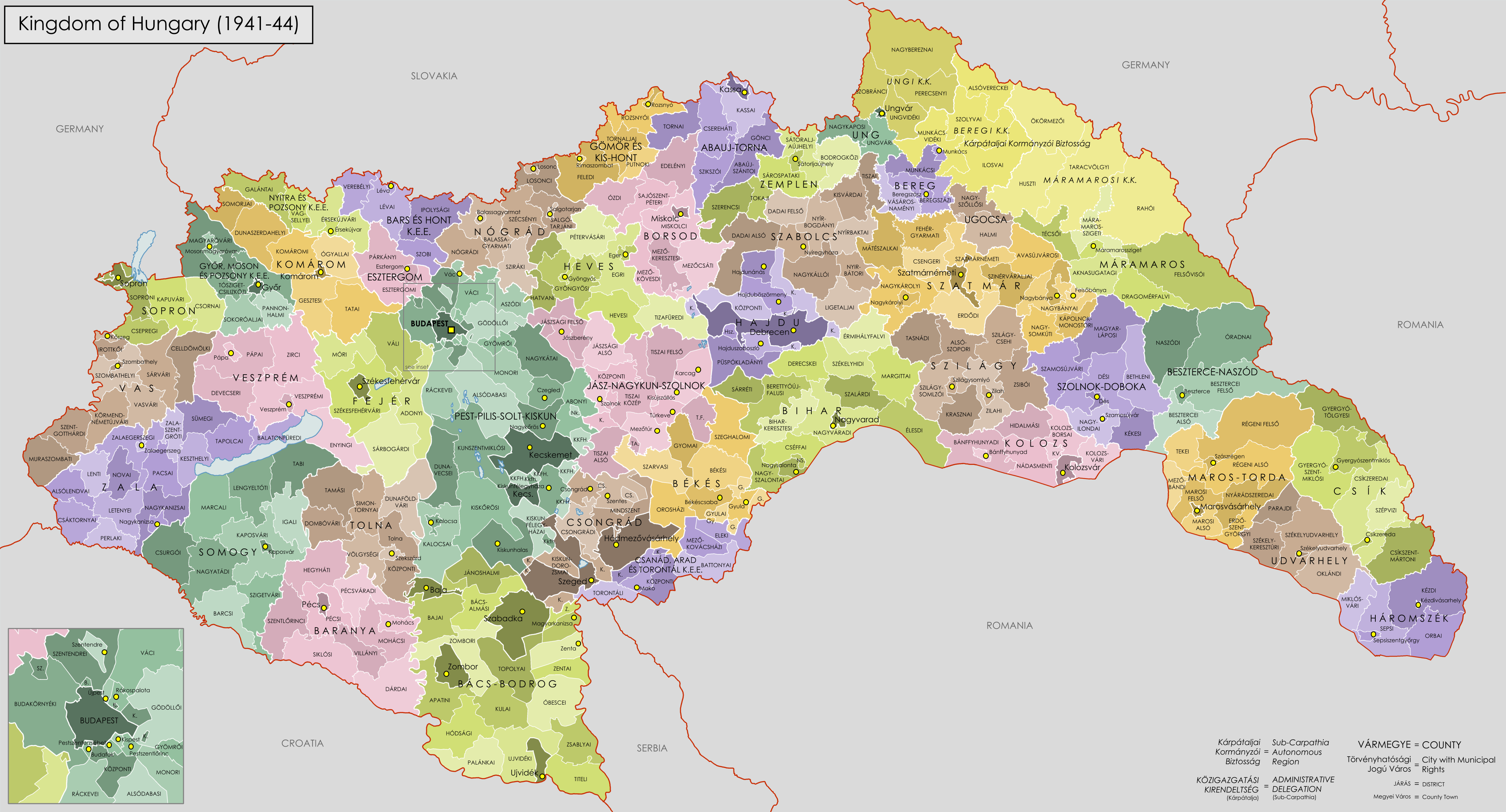
The Kingdom of Hungary in 1941

After the successful revision policy, Hungary sought further solutions to the remainder of its former territories and demanded the concession of Transylvanian territory from Romania. The Axis powers were not interested in opening a new conflict in Central Europe; both countries were facing strong diplomatic pressures to avoid any military operations. Finally both parties accepted the arbitration of Germany and Italy, known as the Second Vienna Award, and as a result Northern Transylvania was assigned to Hungary. Shortly afterward, the Kingdom of Hungary joined the Axis powers. Hitler demanded that the Hungarian government follow Germany's military and racial agenda to avoid potential conflict in the future. Antisemitism was already an established political cause by the far right in Hungary. In 1944, after the ousting of Horthy by Hitler and before the installation of the National-Socialist Arrow Cross Party, the Hungarian government readily aided Nazi Germany in the deportation of hundreds of thousands of Jews to concentration camps during the Holocaust, where most of them died.

In April 1941, Hungary let the Wehrmacht into her territory, thus supporting Germany and Italy in the invasion of Yugoslavia. After the Independent State of Croatia was proclaimed, Hungary joined the military operations and was allowed to annex the Bačka (Bácska) region in Vojvodina, which had a majority of Hungarians, as well as the region of Muraköz (present-day Prekmurje and Medjimurje), which had large Slovenian and Croatian minorities, respectively.

On 27 June 1941, László Bárdossy declared war on the Soviet Union. Fearing a potential turn of support to the Romanians, the Hungarian government sent armed forces to support the German war effort during Operation Barbarossa. This support cost the Hungarians dearly. Almost the entire Second Army Group of the Royal Hungarian Army was lost during the Battle of Stalingrad.

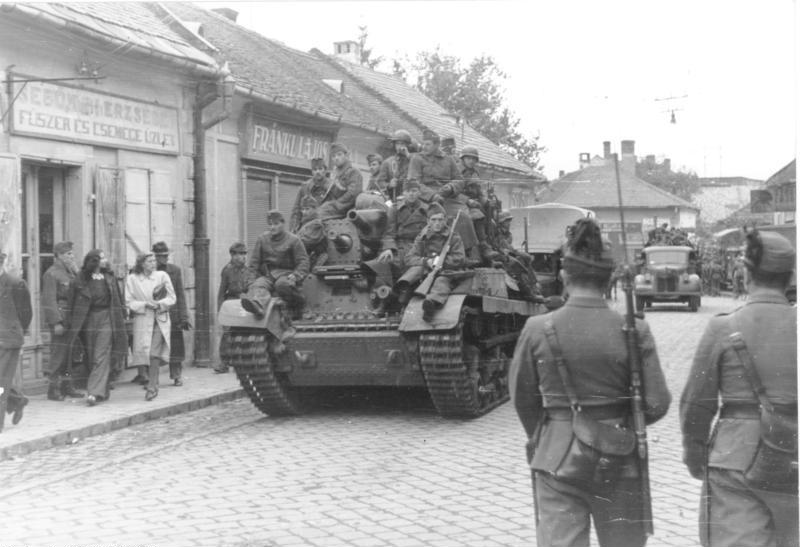
Hungarian armor and infantry in retreat, August 1944

By early 1944, with Soviet forces fast advancing from the east, Hungary was caught attempting to contact the British and the Americans to secretly escape the war and establish an armistice with the Allies. On 19 March 1944, the Germans responded by invading Hungary in Operation Margarethe. German forces occupied key locations to ensure Hungarian loyalty. They placed Horthy under house arrest and replaced Prime Minister Miklós Kállay with a more pliable successor. Döme Sztójay, an avid supporter of the Nazis, became the new Hungarian prime minister. Sztójay governed with the aid of a Nazi military governor, Edmund Veesenmayer: he legalized the antisemitic and pro-Nazi Arrow Cross Party, started to deport Hungarian Jews en masse to Germany and initiated a violent crackdown on liberal and leftist opposition. Increasingly appalled by Sztójay's methods and alarmed by the imminent collapse of the Eastern Front, Horthy was finally able to remove him in August 1944 and replaced him with the more balanced Géza Lakatos.

By October of the same year, the Hungarians were again caught trying to quit the war, and the Germans launched Operation Panzerfaust. They kidnapped Horthy's son, forced Horthy to resign, and replaced him with Arrow Cross leader Ferenc Szálasi. The Government of National Unity was proclaimed, and it continued the war on the side of the Axis. Szálasi did not replace Horthy as regent, but was appointed as the "Leader of the Nation" ("Nemzetvezető") and prime minister of the new "Hungarist state". Antisemitic persecution and pogroms increased during Szálasi's regime and his militias were singularly responsible of the murder of 10,000–15,000 Hungarian Jews.

The new Quisling regime, however, was to be short-lived, for in November 1944 the Red Army had already reached Budapest and a long siege started, while Szálasi fled the capital. On 21 December 1944, a Hungarian "Interim Assembly" met in Debrecen, with the approval of the Soviet Union. This assembly elected an interim counter-government headed by Béla Miklós, the former commander of the Hungarian First Army.

The new government declared war on Germany, concluded an armistice with the Allied powers and established People's Tribunals to prosecute accused war criminals in January 1945; in march, it implemented a land reform. It acted under the supervision of the Soviet-dominated Allied Control Commission headed by the Soviet marshal Kliment Voroshilov. As the Hungarist government retained control over the Hungarian army, the Debrecen government began forming the new army to assist the USSR in the war; however, the Hungarian volunteers were able to create only small units, and the biggest Hungarian unit to fight on the Soviet side was the Volunteer Regiment of Buda.

Budapest capitulated in February 1945 and the so-called Government of National Unity, now in exile in Munich, was disbanded at the end of May 1945.

== Dissolution ==
Under Soviet occupation, the fate of the Kingdom of Hungary was already determined. A High National Council was appointed as the country's collective head of state until the monarchy was formally abolished on 1 February 1946. The regency was replaced by the Second Hungarian Republic. It was quickly followed by the creation of the Hungarian People's Republic.

== Historical assessment ==
There has been some debate as to what extent the Hungarian state of the 1930s and '40s can be classified as fascist. According to Richard Griffiths, the regime's increasing economic dependence on Germany, its passage of antisemitic legislation and its participation in exterminating local Jews all place it within the realm of international fascism.

== See also ==
- Interwar Hungary
- Hungary in World War II
- International relations (1919–1939) § Hungary
- Allied powers of World War II
- Axis powers of World War II
- Hungarian volunteers in the Winter War
- Greater Hungary

== Books ==
- Cornelius, Deborah S. (2011). Hungary in World War II Caught in the Cauldron. New York: Fordham University Press. ISBN 9780823237739.
- Dèak, Istvàn (2016). "Introduction". In Frederick Bondy, Jenő Lévai (ed.). The Writers, Artists, Singers, and Musicians of the National Hungarian Jewish Cultural Association (OMIKE), 1939–1944. West Lafayette: Purdue University Press. pp. 1–20. ISBN 9781612494814.
- Dunajeva, Jekatyerina (2021). Constructing Identities over Time: “Bad Gypsies" and “Good Roma" in Russia and Hungary. Budapest: Central European University Press.
- Katz, Katalin (2006). "The Roma of Hungary in the Second World War". In Donald Kenrick (ed.). The Gypsies During the Second World War. Hatfield: University of Hertfordshire Press. pp. 47–86.
- Klein, Bernard (Spring 1982). "Anti-Jewish Demonstrations in Hungarian Universities, 1932-1936: István Bethlen vs Gyula Gömbös". Jewish Social Studies. 44 (2): 112–124.
- Janos, Andrew (2012). The Politics of Backwardness in Hungary, 1825-1945. Princeton: Princeton University Press. ISBN 9781400843022.
- Laczó, Ferenc (2016). Hungarian Jews in the Age of Genocide An Intellectual History, 1929–1948. Leiden: Brill. ISBN 9789004328655.

Preceded by Austria-Hungary; 1867–1918 Hungarian Democratic Republic; 1918–1919 Hungarian Soviet Republic; 1919 Hungarian Republic; 1919–1920 White Terror; 1919–1921	Kingdom of Hungary also known as the Regency; 1920–1946	Horthy regime (1920–1944) succeeded by Government of National Unity (Ferenc Szálasi); 1944–1945 Provisional Governments of Béla Miklós and Zoltán Tildy; 1944–1946 Second Hungarian Republic; 1946–1949 People's Republic of Hungary; 1949–1989
