= Ernő Gerő =

Hungarian communist politician (1898–1980)

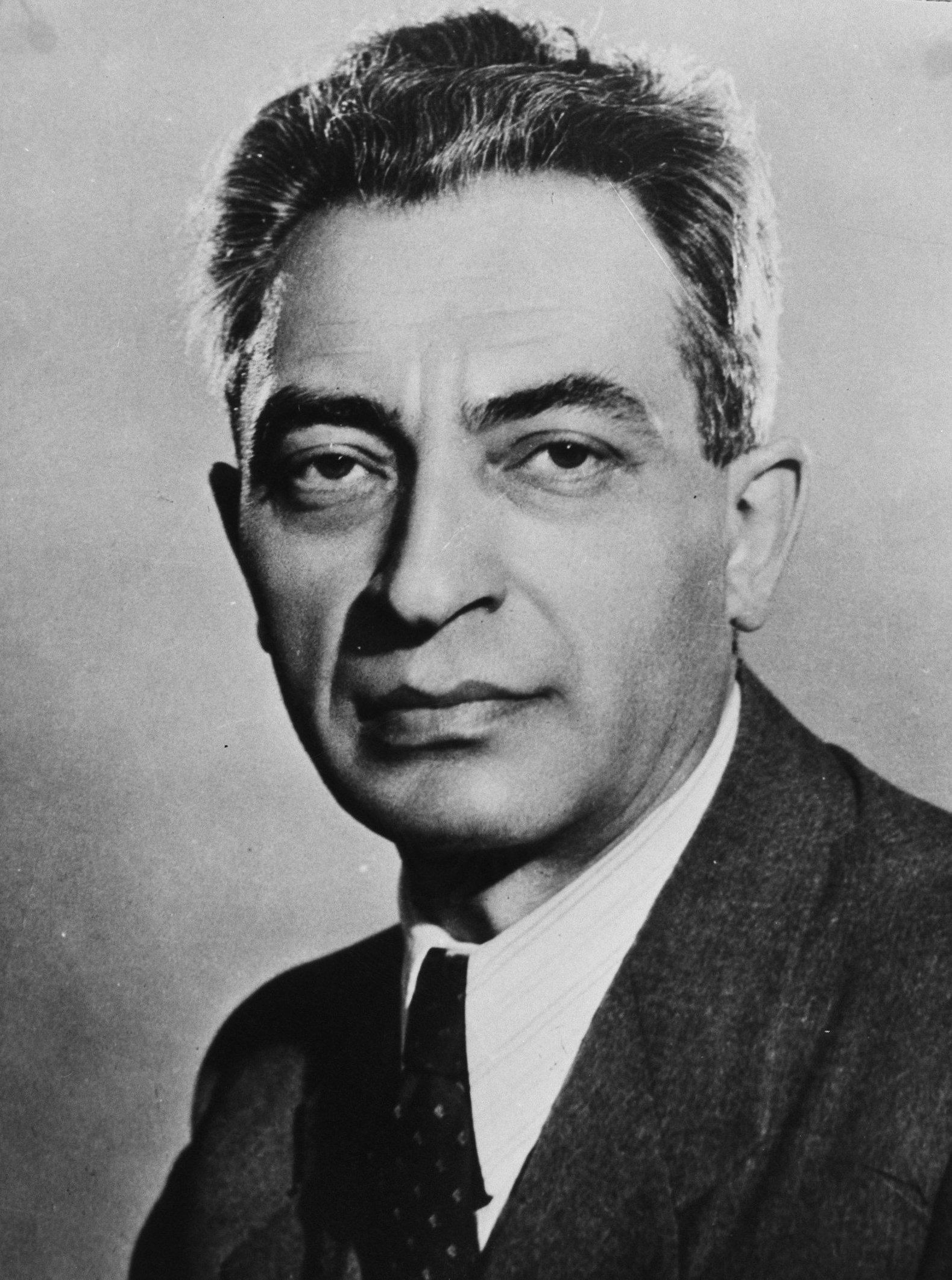

First Secretary of the Hungarian Working People's Party
- In office 18 July 1956 – 25 October 1956
- Preceded by: Mátyás Rákosi
- Succeeded by: János Kádár

Minister of the Interior
- In office 4 July 1953 – 6 June 1954
- Prime Minister: Imre Nagy
- Preceded by: József Györe
- Succeeded by: László Piros

Minister of Finance
- In office 3 December 1948 – 11 June 1949
- Prime Minister: Lajos Dinnyés István Dobi
- Preceded by: Miklós Nyárádi
- Succeeded by: István Kossa

Minister of Transport (Note: Minister of Trade and Transport until 15 November 1945, when the ministry was divided into two separate ministries.)
- In office 11 May 1945 – 18 February 1949
- Prime Minister: Béla Miklós Zoltán Tildy Ferenc Nagy Lajos Dinnyés István Dobi
- Preceded by: Gábor József
- Succeeded by: Lajos Bebrits

Member of the High National Council
- In office 26 January 1945 – 11 May 1945 Serving with Béla Miklós and Béla Zsedényi
- Preceded by: Ferenc Szálasi (as Leader of the Nation)
- Succeeded by: József Révai

Personal details
- Born: Ernő Singer; 8 July 1898 Terbegec, Kingdom of Hungary, Austro-Hungarian Empire (now Trebušovce, Slovakia)
- Died: 12 March 1980 (aged 81) Budapest, Hungarian People's Republic
- Party: Hungarian Communist Party (1918–1942); Hungarian Working People's Party (1942–1956); Hungarian Socialist Workers' Party (1956–1962)
- Spouse: Erzsébet Fazekas (died 1967)
- Children: 3

Ernő Gerő (Note: Hungarian pronunciation: [ˈɛrnøː ˈɡɛrøː]) (né Singer; 8 July 1898 – 12 March 1980) was a Hungarian Communist leader in the period after World War II and briefly the most powerful man in Hungary in 1956, as leader of the ruling Hungarian Working People's Party.

== Early career ==
Gerő was born in Terbegec, Hont County of the Kingdom of Hungary (now Trebušovce, Slovakia) as one of 10 children to Hungarian-Jewish parents, although he later repudiated religion. His father was a retail merchant. Gerő completed his secondary education in Újpest outside Budapest and then enrolled in medical school. A member of the Hungarian Communist Party from its foundation in November 1918, he abandoned his studies when the Hungarian Soviet Republic was proclaimed and became a permanent member of the Young Communists. When the revolution was crushed, Singer emigrated to Vienna, and participated in organizational work in a number of foreign locations. He returned illegally to Hungary in September 1921 and was arrested after twelve months. Sentenced to 16 years in prison, he was released with a group of Communists after a year and a half following a prisoner exchange agreement between Moscow and Budapest, and subsequently deported to the Soviet Union.

Already speaking seven languages, he was hired by the Comintern in 1925, which immediately sent him to a factory for six months to learn Russian; he was then sent to France, where he headed the Hungarian subsection of the French Communist Party until 1928. From his arrival to the Soviet Union, Gerő was an active NKVD agent, and performed foreign assignments for the NKVD and the Comintern in Belgium, Sweden, Finland and Yugoslavia. He also fought in the Spanish Civil War, during which he performed purges against Trotskyist groups in the International Brigades.

The outbreak of the Second World War in Europe found him in Moscow again, and he remained there for the duration of the war. After the dissolution of the Communist International in 1943, he was in charge of propaganda directed at enemy forces and prisoners of war. Gerő was among the first Communist functionaries to return to Hungary in early November 1944, and later that month participated in discussions in Moscow detailing the terms of Hungary's surrender in the war. Back in Hungary in December, he was one of the main organizers of the provisional assembly which concluded an armistice with the victorious powers. Gerő finally settled in Budapest during the last stages of the Budapest offensive in January 1945, and began heading the party apparatus in the capital. He served as a member of the High National Council, Hungary's provisional government, from 26 January until 11 May 1945, when he was appointed Minister of Trade and Transport (from 15 November 1945 only Minister of Transport).

In the November 1945 election, the Hungarian Communist Party, under Gerő and Mátyás Rákosi, got 17% of the vote, compared to 57% for the Independent Smallholders' Party, but the Soviet commander in Hungary, Marshal Kliment Voroshilov, installed a coalition government with communists in key posts. In June 1948 Gerő became a member of the Secretariat of the Hungarian Working People's Party, formed following a forged merger between the Hungarian Communist Party and the Social Democratic Party of Hungary, and was appointed deputy to General Secretary Mátyás Rákosi in November. In the May 1949 election the Hungarian Independent People's Front, a coalition headed by the Hungarian Working People's Party, won an absolute majority of the vote and took full control. Gerő and Mihály Farkas were Rákosi's right-hand men, with Gerő serving as Chairman of the National Economic Council and heading the collectivization of agriculture.

Rákosi took over the premiership as well in 1952. However, his authority was shaken a year later by the death of Stalin, when the more reform-minded Imre Nagy took over as Prime Minister. Gerő was retained as a counterweight to the reformers. In June 1953, Gerő took part in a party delegation to Moscow, after which he adopted a self-critical stance regarding the political and economic mistakes and excesses committed since 1948; however, this did not lead to a change in policy. From July 1953 to June 1954 he served as Minister of the Interior and Deputy Prime Minister under Nagy. Rákosi, having thus far managed to regain control, was finally undermined by Nikita Khrushchev's so-called "Secret Speech" denouncing Stalinism in early 1956, and was forced to leave office on 18 July 1956 by Anastas Mikoyan. He retained enough influence for the Hungarian Working People's Party to designate Gerő as his successor as First Secretary.

== Gerő interregnum ==
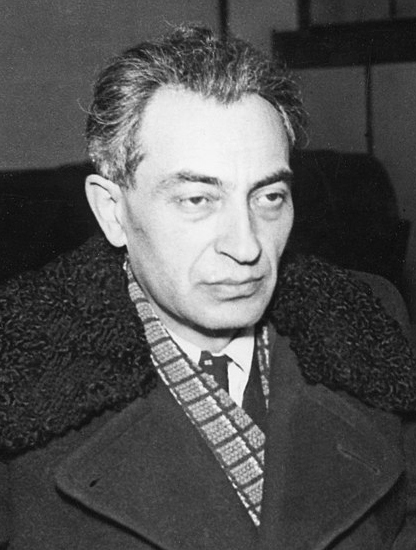
Gerő in 1955

Gerő led the country for a brief period of just over three months, known as the Gerő Interregnum, starting on 18 July 1956; however, his close association with Rákosi made his leadership unacceptable for large parts of the Hungarian population. On 23 October, students marched through Budapest intending to present a petition to the government. The procession swelled, prompting Gerő to reply with a harsh speech that angered the people, as police opened fire. It proved to be the start of the Hungarian Revolution of 1956.

His inability to quell the protests caused Gerő to lose support from the Soviets. As the revolution spread throughout the country, the Central Committee of the Hungarian Working People's Party met on 25 October and agreed that János Kádár, a former government minister who had been imprisoned on trumped-up charges of espionage between 1951 and 1954, be made party leader, and that Imre Nagy, the former Prime Minister who had been dismissed due to political differences with the party's Stalinist wing, again be made Prime Minister.

== Later life and death ==
On 28 October 1956, the deposed Gerő was evacuated from Hungary to the Soviet Union, where he was given a position at the Institute of Economics of the Academy of Sciences. On 9 May 1957, he was stripped of his parliamentary mandate and his membership of the Presidential Council. He was finally allowed to return from exile in April 1960; in August 1962, a resolution of the Central Committee of the Hungarian Socialist Workers' Party (which had succeeded the former Hungarian Working People's Party) established Gerő's responsibility for the violations and excesses committed in the 1950s, and expelled him from the party. During his retirement he lived in seclusion in Budapest, working as an occasional translator. In 1977 he sought to be readmitted as a member of the Hungarian Socialist Workers' Party, but his application was rejected. He died in Budapest in 1980 at the age of 81.

== Works ==
- There will be a Hungarian rebirth. Ernő Gerő's speech at the Szeged rally held on November 7; Új Dunántúl Könyvkiadó, Pécs, 1944
- The Hungarian Communist Party. March 7, 1945; Szikra, Budapest, 1945 (MKP Seminar)
- Communists at the National Assembly. Speech by Ernő Gerő, Mihály Keresztes, József Révai; Szikra, Budapest, 1945
- Conditions for the Economic Reconstruction of Hungary; Szikra, Budapest, 1946 (Political Academy of the Hungarian Communist Party)
- Questions of popular democracy. Speeches by Ernő Gerő, László Rajk, etc. at the 3rd Congress of the Hungarian Communist Party; Szikra, Budapest, 1946
- The Balance Sheet of Stabilization; Szikra, Budapest, 1946
- The foundations of Hungary's three-year economic plan. Lecture by Ernő Gerő on December 20, 1946 / Commentators Jenő Rácz, György Kemény; Szikra, Budapest, 1947 (Political Academy of the Hungarian Communist Party)
- The Foundation of Prosperity – Hungary's Three-Year Plan. Contributions by Jenő Rácz and György Kemény; Szikra, Budapest, 1947
- Financial Issues of the Three-Year Plan; Szikra, Budapest, 1947
- The Chain Bridge must rise up! / Speech by Zoltán Tildy and Ernő Gerő at the inaugural meeting of the Chain Bridge Committee; Eisler Ny., Budapest, 1947
- Three-Year Plan; Szikra, Budapest, 1947 (Library of Work and Knowledge)
- With the cooperatives for the rise of the working peasantry; in: National Cooperative Conference of the Hungarian Workers' Party. 1948. VII. 10–11. Report by Ernő Gerő, András Hegedüs, Ferenc Donáth, opening by the president Sándor Rónai; Szikra, Budapest, 1948
- Speeches by Ernő Gerő, Zoltán Vas, Imre Vajda at the meeting of the Central Leadership on Nov. 27; Szikra Ny., Budapest, 1948
- The First National Congress of Leading Workers. August 1, 1948. Complete minutes of the meeting / Speech by László Piros / Comments by Ernő Gerő, Árpád Szakasits; Trade Union Council, Budapest, 1948
- Structural changes and the future of our national economy; Szikra, Budapest, 1948
- National Building Workers' Youth. Ernő Gerő's speech at the 1st National Production Conference of the SZIT on March 16, 1948; SZIT, Budapest, 1948
- We are opening a bridge. Speech by Ernő Gerő on November 21, 1948; Hírlapkiadó Ny., Szeged, 1948
- On the Path of People's Democracy for Socialism. Contributions by Ernő Gerő, László Rajk, etc. at the Unification Congress of the Hungarian Communist Party and the Social Democratic Party; Szikra, Budapest, 1948
- Towards socialism with the five-year plan. Ernő Gerő's speech at the National Assembly on December 9, 1949; HM Political Main Group Headquarters, Budapest, 1949 (Political Library of the Armed Forces)
- Our Five-Year Plan: the Path of People's Democracy Towards a Prosperous, Strong, Educated, Socialist Hungary; HM Political Main Group Headquarters, Budapest, 1949 (Political Library of the Armed Forces)
- The Politics of the Hungarian Workers' Party in the Village; MDP Central Education Department, Budapest, 1949
- The new tasks of our national economy. Speeches by Ernő Gerő, Zoltán Vas, Imre Vajda; Szikra, Budapest, 1949
- With the five-year plan for a prosperous, strong, independent socialist Hungary; MDP, Budapest, 1949
- Five-Year Plan of the Hungarian National Economy; Szikra, Budapest, 1949
- The achievements of our people's democracy so far and the further tasks of the five-year plan. For urban and factory educators; MDP, Budapest, 1950
- The Construction of Socialism in the Countries of People's Democracy. Problems of the Economy of People's Democracy; Szikra, Budapest, 1950 (Lectures of the Party College of the Hungarian Workers' Party)
- In the fight for a socialist national economy. Selected speeches and articles 1944–1950; Szikra, Budapest, 1950
- Resolution of the Central Leadership of the Hungarian Workers' Party on the immediate tasks of developing the Hungarian national economy / Resolution of the Central Leadership of the Hungarian Workers' Party on the fight against clerical reaction / Report by Comrade Ernő Gerő and József Révai; MDP, Budapest, 1950
- Report by Ernő Gerő at the 2nd Congress of the Hungarian Workers' Party; MDP, Budapest, 1951
- For the land of iron, steel, and machines; Szikra, Budapest, 1952
- With Party Unity for Socialist Democracy / Keynote Speech and Closing Remarks by Ernő Gerő / Resolution of the Central Leadership; Szikra, Budapest, 1956

== In popular culture ==
His character plays a central role in Vilmos Kondor's 2012 novel, Budapest Noir.

Political offices
Preceded by Miklós Nyárádi	Minister of Finance; 1948–1949	Succeeded by István Kossa
Preceded by József Györe	Minister of the Interior; 1953–1954	Succeeded by László Piros
Party political offices
Preceded by Mátyás Rákosi	General Secretary of the Hungarian Working People's Party; 18 July 1956 – 25 October 1956	Succeeded by János Kádár
