= Árpád Szakasits =

Hungarian politician (1888–1965)

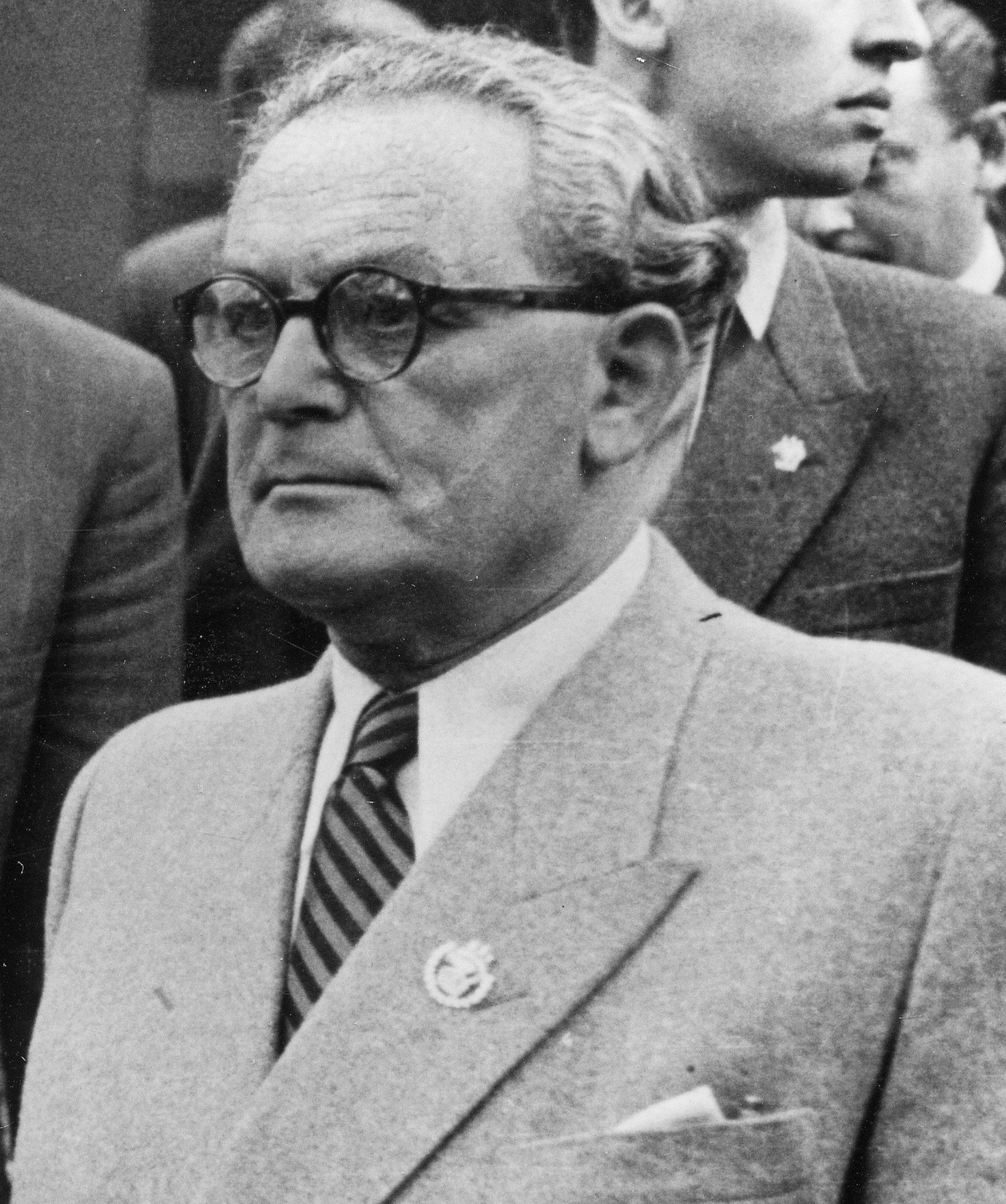

Chairman of the Presidential Council of the People's Republic of Hungary
- In office 23 August 1949 – 8 May 1950
- Prime Minister: István Dobi
- Preceded by: Himself (as President of Hungary)
- Succeeded by: Sándor Rónai

President of Hungary
- In office 3 August 1948 – 23 August 1949
- Prime Minister: István Dobi
- Preceded by: Zoltán Tildy
- Succeeded by: Himself (as Chairman of the Presidential Council of Hungary)

Deputy Prime Minister
- In office 4 February 1946 – 3 August 1948 Serving with Mátyás Rákosi
- Prime Minister: Ferenc Nagy Lajos Dinnyés
- Preceded by: Jenő Szöllősi

Personal details
- Born: 6 December 1888 Budapest, Austria-Hungary
- Died: 3 May 1965 (aged 76) Budapest, Hungary
- Party: Social Democratic Party, Hungarian Working People's Party, Hungarian Socialist Workers' Party
- Spouse(s): Emma Grosz; Maria Theresia Schneider
- Children: György; Klára

Árpád Szakasits (Note: Hungarian pronunciation: [ˈaːrpaːd ˈsɒkɒʃit͡ʃ]) (6 December 1888 – 3 May 1965) was a Hungarian Social Democrat, then Communist politician. He served as the country's head of state from 1948 to 1950, the first Communist to hold the post.

A longtime leader of the Hungarian Social Democratic Party, he supported its merger with the Hungarian Communist Party to form the Hungarian Working People's Party. When President Zoltán Tildy was forced to resign, Szakasits was named his successor on 3 August 1948 as part of the final stage of the Communists' complete takeover of the country.

After the adoption of a new Soviet-style Constitution in 1949, the presidency was replaced with a Presidential Council, and Szakasits became its chairman on 23 August 1949, serving until 26 April 1950.

In 1950, as acting chairman, he was arrested on trumped-up charges of war crimes, espionage, and conspiracy to overthrow the democratic order, and sentenced to life imprisonment. He was released in March 1956. He was also rehabilitated in the spirit of de-Stalinisation. After the Hungarian Revolution, he took part in the consolidation of the Communist regime, and from 1958 he became president of the National Association of Hungarian Journalists and again a member of parliament. He was elected President of the National Peace Council in 1960 and was also President of the World Federation of Hungarians from 1959 to 1963.

Until his death he was a member of the Central Committee of the Hungarian Socialist Workers' Party (MSZMP).

Szakasits was an Esperantist for over 40 years, attended Esperanto congresses, and was a member of the International Patron Committee for the World Esperanto Congress in 1959.

== Personal life ==
Szakasits was married to Emma Grosz (1888–1954). They had together a son, György (1916–1985) and a daughter, Klára (1918–2001). After the death of his first wife, he remarried. His second wife was Maria Theresia Schneider. This marriage was childless.

His daughter Klára was the grandmother of Hungarian politician, András Schiffer, the founder and onetime leader of the Politics Can Be Different political party.

Political offices
Preceded by Zoltán Tildy	President of Hungary; 1948–1949	Succeeded by –
Preceded by (first office holder)	Chairman of the Hungarian Presidential Council; 1949–1950	Succeeded by Sándor Rónai
