= High National Council =

Collective head of state of Hungary in 1945–1946

Head of State of Hungary
- Interim
- In office 26 January 1945 – 1 February 1946 Disputed with Ferenc Szálasi to 28 March 1945
- Monarch: Vacant
- Prime Minister: Béla Miklós
- Preceded by: Ferenc Szálasi as Leader of the Nation
- Succeeded by: Zoltán Tildy as President of the Republic

The High National Council (Hungarian: Nemzeti Főtanács) was the collective head of state of the Kingdom of Hungary from 1945 until 1946.

== Members of the High National Council ==
Parties Independent FKGP MKP

=== First Council ===
| Picture | Name (Birth–Death) | Term of Office | | Political Party | Officeholder |
|---|---|---|---|---|---|
| | Béla Zsedényi (1894–1955) | 26 January 1945 | 29 November 1945 | Independent | Speaker |
| | Ferenc Nagy (1903–1979) | 29 November 1945 | 7 December 1945 | FKGP | Speaker |
| | Béla Miklós (1890–1948) | 26 January 1945 | 15 November 1945 | Independent | Prime Minister |
| | Zoltán Tildy (1889–1961) | 15 November 1945 | 7 December 1945 | FKGP | Prime Minister |
| | Ernő Gerő (1898–1980) | 26 January 1945 | 11 May 1945 | MKP | |
| | József Révai (1898–1959) | 11 May 1945 | 27 September 1945 | MKP | |
| | Mátyás Rákosi (1892–1971) | 27 September 1945 | 7 December 1945 | MKP | |

=== Second Council ===
| Picture | Name (Birth–Death) | Term of Office | | Political Party | Officeholder |
|---|---|---|---|---|---|
| | Ferenc Nagy (1903–1979) | 7 December 1945 | 1 February 1946 | FKGP | Speaker |
| | Zoltán Tildy (1889–1961) | 7 December 1945 | 1 February 1946 | FKGP | Prime Minister |
| | László Rajk (1909–1949) | 7 December 1945 | 1 February 1946 | MKP | |
| | Béla Varga (1903–1995) | 7 December 1945 | 4 January 1946 | FKGP | |
| | Ferenc Szeder (1881–1952) | 4 January 1946 | 1 February 1946 | FKGP | |

== See also ==
- List of heads of state of Hungary

== Sources ==
- World Statesmen - Hungary
