= Béla Varga (politician) =

Hungarian politician

Member of the High National Council
- In office 7 December 1945 – 8 January 1946 Serving with Zoltán Tildy, Ferenc Nagy, and László Rajk
- Preceded by: Béla Miklós Béla Zsedényi Mátyás Rákosi
- Succeeded by: Zoltán Tildy as President of the Republic

Speaker of the National Assembly of Hungary
- In office 7 February 1946 – 3 July 1947
- Preceded by: Ferenc Nagy
- Succeeded by: Árpád Szabó

Personal details
- Born: 18 February 1903 Börcs, Austria-Hungary
- Died: 13 October 1995 (aged 92) Budapest, Hungary
- Profession: Priest, politician

Béla Varga (18 February 1903 – 13 October 1995) was a Hungarian Catholic priest and politician. He was one of the founders of the Independent Smallholders' Party. During World War II, Varga assisted Polish refugees to flee the Nazis. He was arrested by USSR Red Army troops in 1945 and sentenced to death, but released and served as Speaker of the National Assembly of Hungary February 7, 1946 – July 3, 1947. Msgr. Varga emigrated to the United States in 1947, where he worked as a priest in New York City, but returned to his native country in 1990 shortly after the Communist Party lost power in 1989, at which point Hungary moved from a one-party socialist state towards a multi-party democracy. In February 1989, the Hungarian Socialist Workers' Party (MSZMP) agreed to introduce a pluralist political system and in May 1989, the barbed wire fence along Hungary's border was taken down which led to the fall of the Iron Curtain. The first free elections took place in March–April 1990. Once he returned to Hungary, Béla Varga was welcomed as a respected elder statesman, and he focused mainly on public and political engagement. He also reconnected with Hungarian political and religious groups and then lived a quiet life in Veszprém, until his death in 1995.

Political offices
Preceded by Ferenc Nagy	Speaker of the National Assembly; 1946–1947	Succeeded by Árpád Szabó
