= Trebušovce =

Trebušovce Terbegec
- Municipality
- Flag

- Location of Trebušovce in the Banská Bystrica Region Location of Trebušovce in Slovakia
- Coordinates: 48.12°N 19.20°E
- Country: Slovakia
- Region: Banská Bystrica Region
- District: Veľký Krtíš District
- First mentioned: 1247

Government
  - Mayor: Marek Krnáč (Hungarian Alliance)

Area
  - Total: 9.49 km^{2} (3.66 sq mi)
- Elevation: 163 m (535 ft)

Population (2025)
  - Total: 160
- Time zone: UTC+1 (CET)
  - Summer (DST): UTC+2 (CEST)
- Postal code: 991 27
- Area code: +421 47
- Vehicle registration plate (until 2022): VK
- Website: www.trebusovce.sk

Trebušovce (Hungarian: Terbegec) is a village and municipality in the Veľký Krtíš District of the Banská Bystrica Region of southern Slovakia.

== Geography ==
The municipality lies at an altitude of 163 metres (535 ft) and covers an area of 9.49 km^{2} (3.66 sq mi) (2025). It is located around 20 kilometres (12 mi) southwest of Veľký Krtíš.

== Population ==
Population statistic (10 years)
Year	1995	2005	2015	2025
Count	218	198	191	160
Difference		−9.17%	−3.53%	−16.23%

Population statistic
Year	2024	2025
Count	157	160
Difference		+1.91%

It has a population of 160 people (31 December 2025).

=== Ethnicity ===
Census 2021 (1+ %)
Ethnicity	Number	Fraction
Hungarian	142	84.02%
Slovak	43	25.44%
Not found out	6	3.55%
Total	169	

In year 2021 was 169 people by ethnicity 142 as Hungarian, 43 as Slovak, 6 as Not found out and 1 as Moravian.

Note on population: The difference values of population numbers in the table "Population statistic" and in the sections "Ethnicity" & "Religion" is caused by the use of various statistical methods.

=== Religion ===
Census 2021 (1+ %)
Religion	Number	Fraction
Roman Catholic Church	152	89.94%
None	11	6.51%
Evangelical Church	2	1.18%
Total	169	

In year 2021 was 169 people by religion 152 from Roman Catholic Church, 11 from None, 2 from Evangelical Church, 1 from Not found out, 1 from Christian Congregations in Slovakia, 1 from Greek Catholic Church and 1 from Baptists Church.

== History ==
After the Treaty of Trianon it became part of Czechoslovakia. As a result of the First Vienna Award, it returned to the Kingdom of Hungary until the end of WW II. Afterwards it again became part of Czechoslovakia until the Velvet Divorce. Since then it has been part of Slovakia.

== Notable people ==
- Ernő Gerő (1898–1980), Hungarian communist leader
