= Béla Zsedényi =

Hungarian jurist and politician

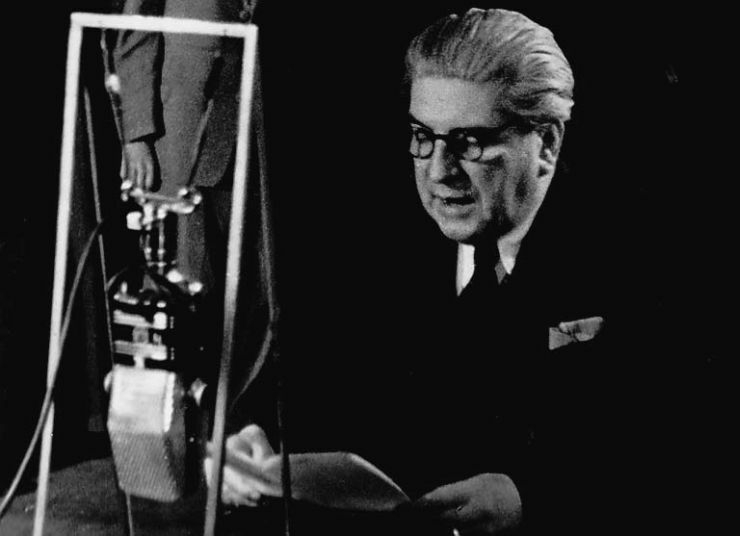

Speaker of the Provisional National Assembly of Hungary
- In office 21 December 1944 – 29 November 1945
- Preceded by: István Vásáry
- Succeeded by: Ferenc Nagy

Member of the High National Council
- In office 26 January 1945 – 7 December 1945 Serving with: Béla Miklós; Ernő Gerő (until 11 May); József Révai (11 May – 27 September); Mátyás Rákosi (from 27 September)
- Preceded by: Ferenc Szálasi (as Leader of the Nation)
- Succeeded by: Second High National Council: Zoltán Tildy; Ferenc Nagy; Béla Varga; László Rajk

Personal details
- Born: 5 April 1894 Aknasugatag, Austria-Hungary (today Ocna Șugatag, Romania)
- Died: 8 February 1955 (aged 60) Budapest, Hungarian People's Republic
- Party: Civic Radical Party; Hungarian Independence Party; Civic Democratic Party
- Profession: Jurist; politician

Béla Zsedényi de Lőcse (Hungarian: lőcsei Zsedényi Béla; 5 April 1894 – 8 February 1955) was a Hungarian jurist and politician who served as Speaker of the Provisional National Assembly of Hungary between 1944 and 1945. He was a member of the High National Council due to his office.

Political offices
Preceded by István Vásáry	Speaker of the Provisional National Assembly; 1944–1945	Succeeded by Ferenc Nagy
