= Ferenc Nagy =

Hungarian politician

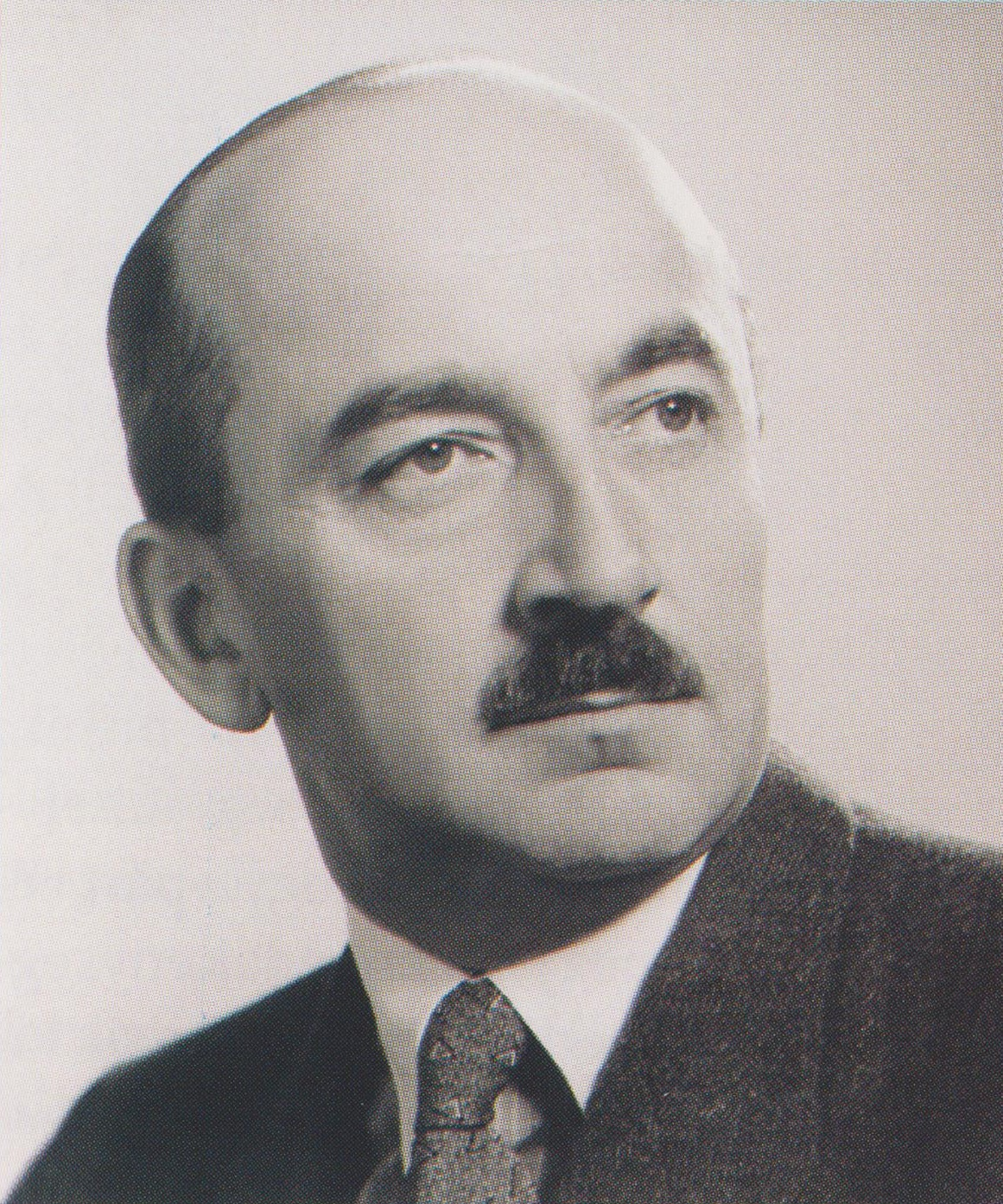
- Nagy in 1946

Prime Minister of Hungary
- In office 4 February 1946 – 31 May 1947
- President: Zoltán Tildy
- Deputy: Mátyás Rákosi Árpád Szakasits
- Preceded by: Zoltán Tildy Mátyás Rákosi (acting)
- Succeeded by: Mátyás Rákosi (acting) Lajos Dinnyés

Speaker of the National Assembly of Hungary
- In office 29 November 1945 – 7 February 1946
- Preceded by: Béla Zsedényi
- Succeeded by: Béla Varga

Member of the High National Council
- In office 7 December 1945 – 1 February 1946 Serving with Zoltán Tildy, László Rajk, and Béla Varga (to 8 January 1946)
- Preceded by: Béla Miklós Béla Zsedényi Mátyás Rákosi
- Succeeded by: Zoltán Tildy (as President of Hungary)

Member of the National Assembly
- In office 15 June 1939 – 12 April 1944
- In office 2 April 1945 – 3 June 1947

Personal details
- Born: 8 October 1903 Bisse, Austria-Hungary
- Died: 12 June 1979 (aged 75) Herndon, Virginia, U.S.
- Citizenship: Hungary United States (from 1947)
- Party: Independent Smallholders, Agrarian Workers and Civic Party
- Children: 5

Ferenc Nagy (Note: Hungarian pronunciation: [ˈfɛrɛnt͡s ˈnɒɟ]) (8 October 1903 – 12 June 1979) was a Hungarian politician of the Smallholders Party who served as Prime Minister of Hungary from 1946 until his forced resignation in 1947. He was also a Speaker of the National Assembly of Hungary and a member of the High National Council from 1945 to 1946. Nagy was the second democratically elected prime minister of Hungary, and would be the last until 1990 not to be a Communist or fellow traveler. The subsequent Hungarian prime minister Imre Nagy was unrelated to him.

A longtime peasant advocate who took part in the anti-fascist resistance, Nagy attempted to consolidate democratic rule during his brief tenure as Prime Minister at the head of a grand coalition of Smallholders, Communists, and Social Democrats. However, he was ultimately unable to resist the intrigues of the Soviet-backed Hungarian Communist Party, which subverted his rule and destroyed his party's elected majority through a fabricated conspiracy. A coup d'état by Mátyás Rákosi, deputy premier and leader of the Communist Party, forced Nagy to resign and go into exile in the United States in June 1947. Subsequently, Nagy became a leader of the Hungarian émigré community and academic lecturer who often spoke on Eastern European affairs. He tried and failed to return to his home country during the Hungarian Revolution of 1956, and lived out the rest of his life in the United States.

== Biography ==
=== Early life and career ===
Nagy was born into family of middle-level peasants in the small town of Bisse, and started his political career writing news articles as a self-taught man. He was involved in local peasant societies and was the co-founder of the Peasant Union, and in October 1930 he took part in the foundation of the Independent Smallholders' Party. He entered Parliament in 1939, and was involved in anti-war and anti-Nazi activities during Hungary's participation in World War II on the side of the Axis powers. After the German occupation of Hungary in March 1944, the Gestapo arrested Nagy, but the government of Géza Lakatos intervened to release him during Hungary's botched armistice with the Allies. After the Arrow Cross coup in October, Nagy went into hiding until the Red Army had driven the Nazis out of most of Hungary. He took part in the organization of the anti-fascist provisional government, and was elected to the Provisional National Assembly. Nagy soon became the Smallholders' Party's second-in-command after Zoltán Tildy. In the November 1945 parliamentary elections, the Independent Smallholders' Party won a large majority of the popular vote and parliamentary seats, but pressure from the Soviet-dominated Allied Commission forced them into a coalition arrangement with the Communists and Social Democrats. Nagy was named speaker of the new parliament while Tildy became the new prime minister, and both became members of the High National Council which served as Hungary's provisional collective head of state. After Hungary's transformation into a republic in February 1946 and Tildy's subsequent elevation to President of Hungary, Nagy became the new premier.

=== Premiership ===
As prime minister, he resisted attempts by the Hungarian Communist Party to gain complete control of the government, favoring a parliamentary democracy over both the prewar aristocratic order and the Communists' intended dictatorship of the proletariat. Inheriting a war-ravaged country, his government oversaw the beginnings of reconstruction, including solving a world-record rate of hyperinflation by replacing the Hungarian pengő with the forint in August 1946. This was done with the help of the United States, when in June 1946 President Harry Truman had agreed with Prime Minister Nagy to return gold reserves captured by the US at the end of the war, without which stabilization would have been impossible. His government also signed the Paris Peace Treaties of 1947, formally ending Hungary's involvement in World War II and renouncing all territorial gains in that war, as well as agreeing to pay reparations to the Soviet Union, Czechoslovakia and Yugoslavia. His government also signed a population exchange agreement with Czechoslovakia, allowing the latter to expel as many ethnic Hungarians in Slovakia as Slovaks in Hungary applied for resettlement in Czechoslovakia. Less than 80,000 Hungarian Slovaks ultimately did so, foiling the plans of Czechoslovak president Edvard Beneš to deport his country's ethnic Hungarian minority as was done to its ethnic Germans.

At the same time, the Communist Party and their fellow-travelers soon began to deploy "salami tactics" against the Smallholders' Party, hoping to deprive it of its parliamentary majority, and began demanding the ouster of its most outspoken anti-Communist elements. This began in March 1946 with the formation of a "Left Bloc" including the Communists, Social Democrats, and National Peasant Party, opposed to the majority Smallholders on almost every issue and intending to create political deadlock to force its own agenda. Its first demand was the expulsion of 20 "reactionaries" from the Smallholders' parliamentary group, diminishing their majority. The expelled parliamentarians then formed the Hungarian Freedom Party, which became the country's most vocal anti-Communist opposition force. Nagy was accused by many fellow Smallholders of weakness in resisting these demands, but his ultimate goal was to appease the Communists until a peace treaty could be negotiated and their Soviet sponsors withdrew. He also hoped that by appeasing the Communists, the Hungarian government could use their leverage with Moscow to gain more favorable terms for the peace treaty. This was despite the plainly anti-Hungarian position of the Soviet Politburo, which ended up backing none of Hungary's peace treaty demands and in fact ruled out doing so. Ultimately, the Communist Party's position served as little more than a ploy to increase its own influence.

==== Coup d'état of 1947 ====
From early 1947 the Communist Party under then-Deputy Premier Mátyás Rákosi increased its attacks on the Smallholders, accusing their leaders of complicity in a vast alleged conspiracy. They used this as an excuse to begin forcing the arrest and recall of over 50 of its MPs, successfully depriving the party of its democratically won majority. The Soviet Union, whose army was occupying Hungary at the time through the Allied Commission, played a key role in this process by providing the supposed evidence of the prime minister's involvement, and also kidnapped Béla Kovács—the Smallholders' Party's popular General Secretary—to deport him to the Soviet Union in defiance of Parliament. On 14 May 1947, Nagy traveled abroad to Switzerland, likely hoping to warn the West of the deteriorating situation in Hungary. The Communists used the opportunity to get rid of their strongest remaining opponent, and on 28 May the Soviets presented false evidence implicating Nagy in the conspiracy. As the Communists had taken his son hostage in Budapest, Nagy agreed to resign on 30 May, but did not formally ratify his resignation until his son had reached Switzerland on 2 June. Rákosi appointed Lajos Dinnyés—a Smallholder politician willing to collaborate with the Communists—as his replacement on 31 May, which granted the Communist Party effective control of the Hungarian government.

Subsequently, Nagy was granted asylum in the United States. He would be Hungary's last non-Communist head of government until the collapse of Communist rule and restoration of free elections in 1989–90. In addition, he would be the last prime minister east of the Iron Curtain not to be a Communist or Communist sympathizer until Tadeusz Mazowiecki of Poland in 1989 (while Czechoslovakia maintained a multi-party system until the coup d'état of February 1948, its prime minister at the time of Nagy's ouster was the Communist leader Klement Gottwald).

=== Exile ===
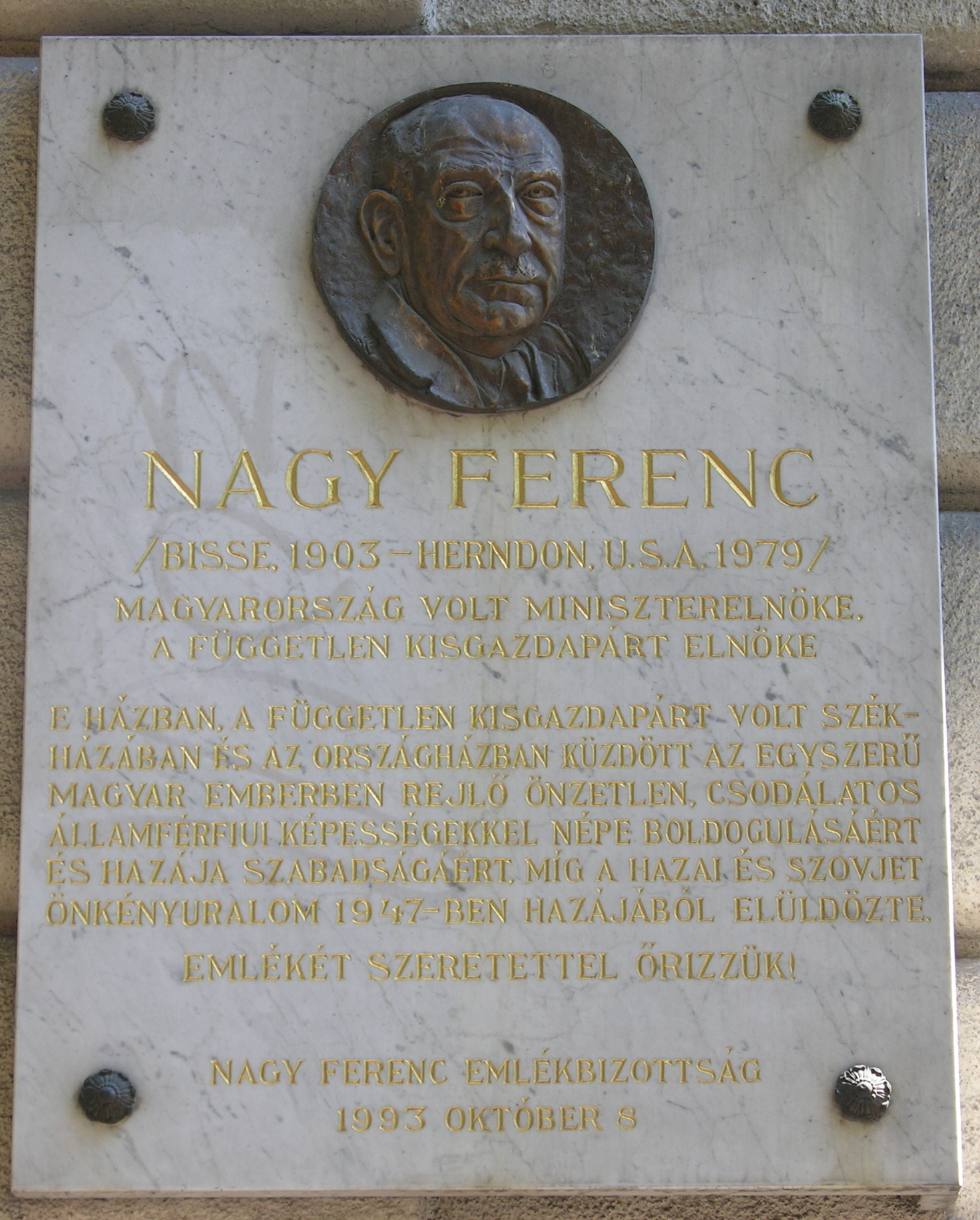
Plaque commemorating Ferenc Nagy

Nagy documented his life and political career in The Struggle behind the Iron Curtain, published by MacMillan in 1948, and royalties from his memoirs helped him buy a house with a 130 acres farm in Herndon, Virginia (then an exurb of Washington, D.C.). Those acreages of land, situated West of Washington D.C., gain significantly in value in 1958 when the Eisenhower administration choose to establish what is now Dulles International Airport just West of Herndon. He was heavily involved in exile politics and served as a member of the Hungarian Committee in exile, and also attended the Bandung Conference in 1955 as an observer on behalf of the US government. During the Hungarian Revolution of 1956 he attempted to return to his home country, but the authorities in Austria prevented him from doing so in order to preserve their country's neutrality. In 1959, he was reported to have been the president of Permindex, a trade organization headquartered in Basel, Switzerland He served as the president of the International Peasant Union from 1964 to 1970. In the 1960s he was a lecturer at various American universities, and received an honorary doctorate from the University of Berkeley and Indiana University in Bloomington. He retired from active political life in 1970, but in 1977 he spoke out in support of the return of the Holy Crown of Hungary from the United States to Hungary. He died unexpectedly at his farm in Herndon in 1979 while planning a return to his home country.

Political offices
Preceded by Béla Zsedényi; Provisional National Assembly	Speaker of the National Assembly; 1945–1946	Succeeded by Béla Varga
Preceded by Zoltán Tildy	Prime Minister of Hungary; 1946–1947	Succeeded by Lajos Dinnyés
Preceded by Jenő Tombor	Minister of Defence; Acting; 1946	Succeeded by Albert Bartha
