= Béla Miklós =

Former Hungarian prime minister (1944-1945)

Vitéz Béla Miklós de Dálnok
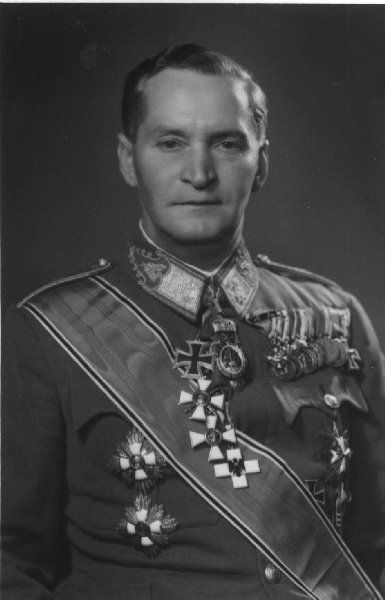
- Miklós in 1942

Prime Minister of Hungary
- In office 22 December 1944 – 15 November 1945 (In opposition until 28 March 1945)
- Monarch: Vacant
- Head of State: High National Council
- Preceded by: Ferenc Szálasi (as Leader of the Nation)
- Succeeded by: Zoltán Tildy

Member of the High National Council
- In office 26 January 1945 – 7 December 1945 Serving with Béla Zsedényi, Ernő Gerő (until 11 May 1945), József Révai (11 May–27 Sep. 1945), and Mátyás Rákosi (from 27 Sep 1945)
- Preceded by: Ferenc Szálasi (as Leader of the Nation)
- Succeeded by: Second High National Council: Zoltán Tildy; Ferenc Nagy; Béla Varga; László Rajk

Personal details
- Born: 11 June 1890 Budapest, Austria-Hungary
- Died: 21 November 1948 (aged 58) Budapest, Hungary
- Party: Hungarian Independence Party
- Spouse(s): Éva Csákány; Irma Varga
- Children: Lajos one daughter
- Profession: Soldier, politician

Military service
- Allegiance: Austria-Hungary (1907–1918); Kingdom of Hungary (1919–1945)
- Branch/service: Austro-Hungarian Army; Royal Hungarian Army
- Years of service: 1907–1918; 1919–1945
- Rank: Colonel General
- Commands: IX Corps; First Army

Béla Miklós de Dálnok, Vitéz of Dálnok (Hungarian: [ˈmikloːʃ ˈbeːlɒ], 11 June 1890 – 21 November 1948) was a Hungarian military officer and politician who served as acting Prime Minister of Hungary, at first in opposition, and then officially, from 1944 to 1945. He was the last Prime Minister of war-time Hungary.

== Biography ==
=== Early career ===
Béla Miklós was born into a Székely primipilus family in Budapest on 11 June 1890. His parents were Gergely Miklós de Dálnok and Janka Traviczky. Miklós used the title of dálnoki after Dálnok, Transylvania (today Dalnic, part of Romania), where his father worked as a teacher. Béla Miklós married Éva Csákány.

He finished secondary studies at the Honvéd Principal Gymnasium of Sopron in 1907. After graduating from Ludovica Military Academy in 1910, he was promoted to Hussar Lieutenant. He participated in the First World War. Returning home, he became a member of the Sopron military command. He graduated from General Staff College between 1920 and 1921, after that he worked in the Ministry of Defence. He was awarded Order of Vitéz by Regent Miklós Horthy in 1929. In that same year he became Deputy Chief of the Regent's Military Office.

Miklós was briefly chief of military intelligence until he was appointed military attaché to Berlin and Stockholm between 1933 and 1936, eventually coming to lead his own regiment. After rising from regimental to corps command, he became military director of the office of Admiral Miklós Horthy, regent of Hungary, in October 1942. He was promoted to Colonel General in 1943.

=== Late World War II ===
Miklós became commanding general of the Hungarian First Army from 1 August 1944 and he supported leaving the Axis powers and joining the Red Army. On 16 October 1944, Miklós was ordered to appear at the headquarters of German General Heinrici. Suspicious of an eventual arrest, he defected through the Hungarian front with one of his aides and two sergeants. He approached the Soviet forces. After some apprehension, they escorted Miklós to Lisko, near Przemyśl. This was the location of the Soviet general headquarters.

Miklós arrived at Lisko on the morning of 17 October. Per the request of the Soviets, he spoke on the radio and made a plea for the commanding officers of his Hungarian First Army to defect with their units to the Soviets.

The Soviets re-armed prisoners of war and planned to form a Hungarian liberation army from the defectors. But, with the exception of one regimental commander, no other Hungarian officer defected in response to Miklós's plea. The one regimental commander who did defect was arrested by the Germans and immediately executed.

A few days later Soviet emissaries were sent to negotiate with Miklós about the formation of a Hungarian counter-Government. These negotiations came to nothing.

=== Interim government ===
On 21 December 1944 the Interim Assembly met in Debrecen. Representatives were present from the Communist, Smallholders, Social Democratic, Peasant Party and Citizen's party. The Assembly elected the interim government, with Soviet approval, which was headed by Miklós. He remained in this post until the coming elections on 15 November 1945. The High National Council, which functioned as a collective head of state, formed on 26 January 1945 under the presidency of Béla Zsedényi. Miklós as incumbent Prime Minister also became a member of the body. During his premiership, the arrest of war criminals and confiscations had begun, pro-German organizations and political parties were dissolved, and the new regime removed the "reactionary elements" from public institutions and the Hungarian army. The Provisional National Government established the people's tribunes. Miklós disbanded the Military Order of Maria Theresa with a decree in the summer of 1945. Béla Miklós could not prevent the deportation of hundreds of thousands to the Soviet Union. Following the 1945 Hungarian parliamentary election, he was replaced by Zoltán Tildy.

=== Later career ===
In July 1947 he became a founding member of the Hungarian Independence Party (MFP: Magyar Függetlenségi Párt), a split from the Independent Smallholders, Agrarian Workers and Civic Party. In the semi-free 1947 Hungarian parliamentary election, he won a seat for the party. However, all mandates of the Independence Party, which was defamed as "fascist", were canceled in November 1947 under pressure from the Communist Hungarian Working People's Party. After that, Miklós withdrew from public life.

He died one year later of unknown causes and was buried without military honour.

== Awards and decorations ==

1st row	Golden Military Merit Medal on war ribbon with swords (7. January 1942)	Order of Merit of the Kingdom of Hungary Commander's Cross with Star on war ribbon with swords (23. September 1941)	Order of Merit of the Kingdom of Hungary Commander's Cross with Star on war ribbon (1940)	Order of Merit of the Kingdom of Hungary Commander's Cross on war ribbon with swords (1939)
2nd row	Order of Merit of the Kingdom of Hungary Commander's Cross on war ribbon	Order of Merit of the Kingdom of Hungary 3rd Class (1932)	Military Merit Cross 3rd Class with war decoration and swords (1914; 1918)	Silver Military Merit Medal on war ribbon with swords (1917)
3rd row	Bronze Military Merit Medal on war ribbon with swords (1915)	Hungarian Bronze Military Merit Medal (1930)	Karl Troop Cross	Hungarian World War I Commemorative Medal
4th row	Long Service Crosses for Officers 2nd class	Long Service Crosses for Officers 3rd class (18. September 1930)	Transylvania Commemorative Medal	Lower Hungary Commemorative Medal
5th row	Mobilization Cross 1912/13	Order of the German Eagle Grand Cross with star (1941)	Grand Cross of the Order "For Military Merit" on war decoration (1. December 1943)	German Red Cross Decoration 1st class (17. October 1936)
6th row	Iron Cross 1st Class (1941)	Iron Cross 2nd Class (1941)		
Badge	Knight's Cross of the Iron Cross (20. January 1942)			
Badge	Badge of the Order of Vitéz			

Political offices
Preceded by Ferenc Szálasi	Prime Minister of Hungary; 1944–1945	Succeeded by Zoltán Tildy
Military offices
Preceded by Lieutenant-General Károly Beregfy	Commander of the Hungarian First Army; 1 August 1944 – 16 October 1944	Succeeded by Lieutenant-General Dezső László
