= Zoltán Tildy Jr. =

Hungarian publisher and photographer

Zoltán Tildy Jr. (6 June 1917 – 22 March 1994) was a Hungarian publisher, photographer, and writer, the son of Prime Minister and President of Hungary Zoltán Tildy.

== Biography ==
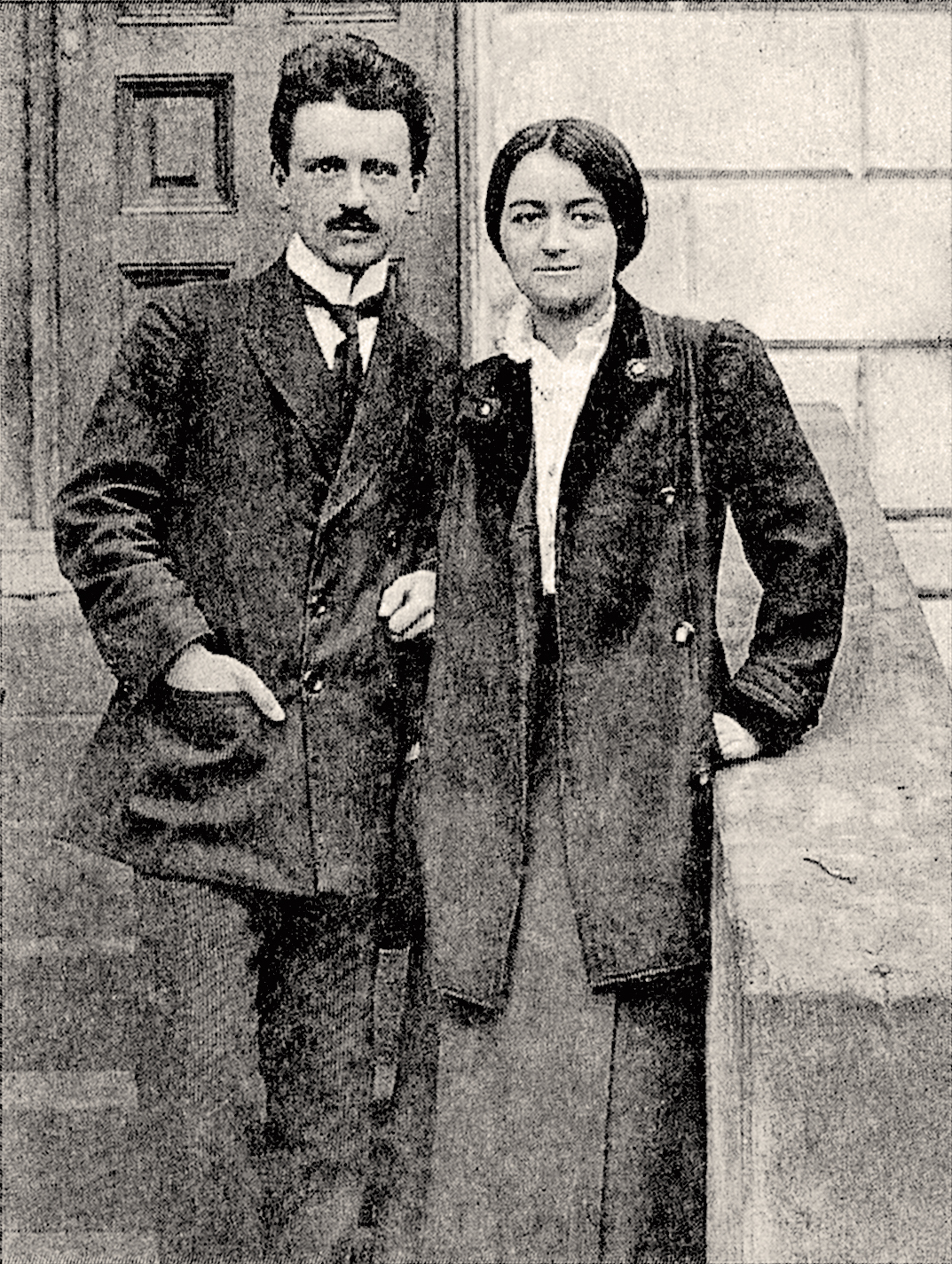
His parents in 1914, two years before they married.

Zoltán Tildy Jr. was born in Dombóvár on 6 June 1917 to minister Zoltán Tildy (1889–1961) and Erzsébet Gyenis (1896–1985), who had married in 1916. His father served as Prime Minister of Hungary from 1945 until 1946, and President of Hungary from 1946 until 1948. Tildy began taking photographs at the age of 15. He had one sister, Erzsébet (1918–2012) and one brother, László (1921–1983). He obtained his law degree in 1941. Zoltán Tildy Jr. was an employee of the Hungarian Publishing Company from 1941 until 1942. In 1956 Tildy was a founding member of the Hungarian Photographers Association. His work included landscapes as well as pictures of animals.

Tildy died on 22 March 1994 (aged 76) in Szeged.
