= József Révai =

Hungarian politician

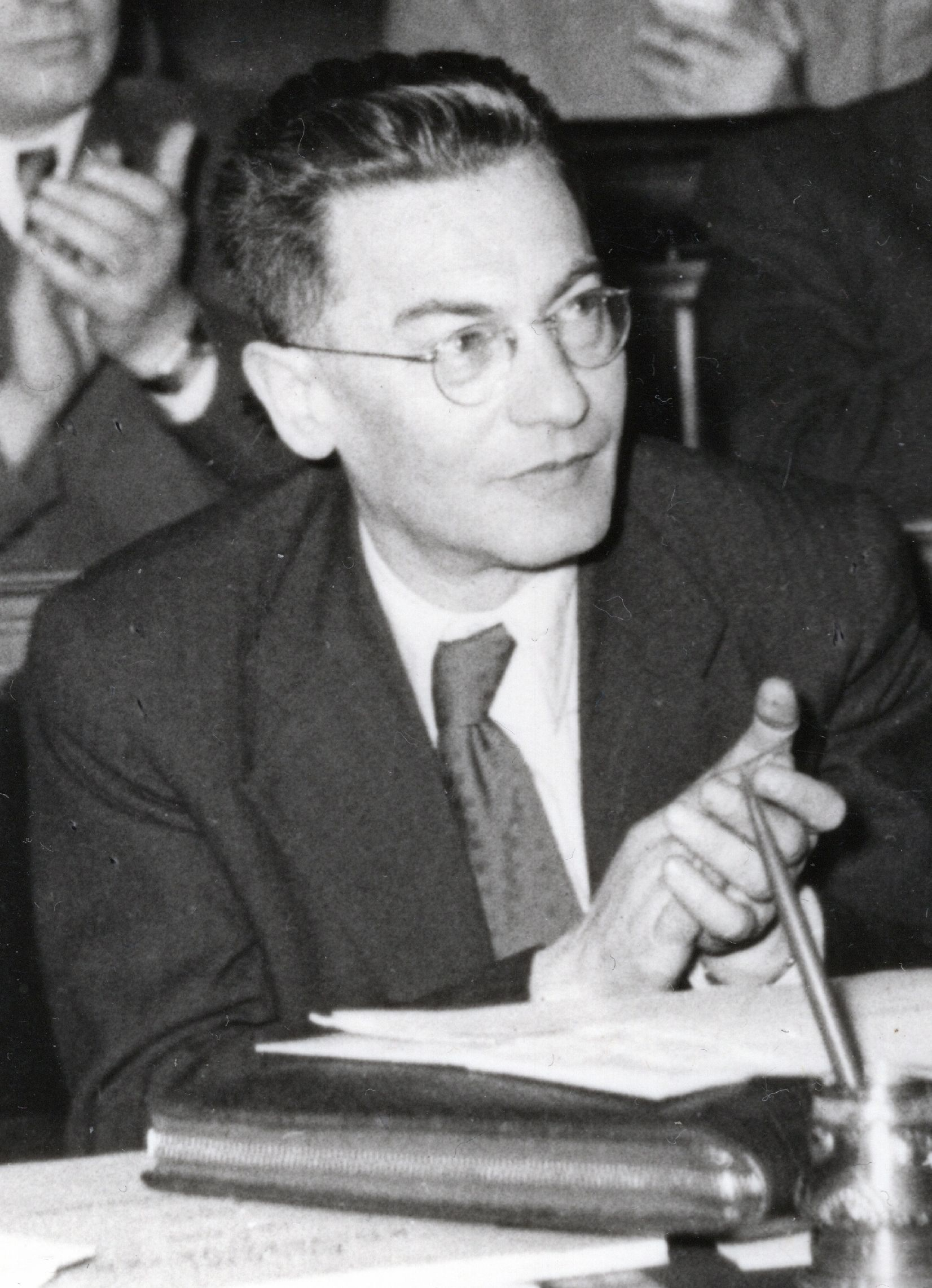
- Révai in 1950

Minister of Popular Culture
- In office 11 June 1949 – 4 July 1953
- Prime Minister: István Dobi (1949–1952); Mátyás Rákosi (1952–1953)
- Preceded by: Gyula Ortutay (as Minister of Education)
- Succeeded by: József Darvas

Member of the High National Council
- In office 11 May 1945 – 27 September 1945 Serving with Béla Miklós and Béla Zsedényi
- Preceded by: Ernő Gerő
- Succeeded by: Mátyás Rákosi

Personal details
- Born: József Lederer; 12 October 1898 Budapest, Austria-Hungary
- Died: 4 August 1959 (aged 60) Budapest, Hungary
- Party: Hungarian Communist Party (1918–1948); Hungarian Working People's Party (1948–1956); Hungarian Socialist Workers' Party (1956–1959)
- Profession: Politician, journalist, writer

József Révai (born József Lederer; 12 October 1898 – 4 August 1959) was a Hungarian communist politician, statesman and cultural ideologue.

== Life and career ==
Révai was born to a middle-class Jewish family. He was one of the founders of the Communist Party of Hungary (Kommunisták Magyarországi Pártja; KMP) in 1918. Révai lived in the Soviet Union between 1934 and 1944. From 11 May to 27 September 1945 he was a member of the High National Council, and between 1945 and 1950 he was chief editor of Szabad Nép ("Free People").

Révai controlled all aspects of Hungary's cultural life from 1948 until 1953; from 1949 he was also the Minister of Culture. After 1953 his influence decreased.

Between 1945–1956 he was a member of the Central Committee of his party, which was renamed in 1948 to Hungarian Working People's Party (Magyar Dolgozók Pártja; MDP) after merging with the Hungarian Social Democratic Party (Magyarországi Szociáldemokrata Párt, MSZDP). He was the member of the Political Committee (1945–1953; 1956). After the Workers' Party was dissolved and the Hungarian Socialist Workers' Party took over its role as the ruling Communist party, Révai became a member of the new party's Central Committee in 1957. He was vice-president to the Presidential Committee between 1953–1958.

Révai died on August 4, 1959, after years of suffering from heart disease.

== Works ==
- Ady (Budapest, 1945)
- Marxizmus és magyarság ("Marxism and the Hungarians"; Budapest, 1946)
- Marxizmus és népiesség ("Marxism and Popularism"; Budapest, 1946)
- Élni tudunk a szabadsággal ("We Can Live with Freedom"; Budapest, 1949)
- Kulturális forradalmunk kérdései ("Questions about our Cultural Revolution"; Budapest, 1952)
- Válogatott irodalmi tanulmányok ("Selected Essays in Literature", Budapest, 1960)
- Válogatott történelmi írások I–II. ("Selected Essays in History I–II."; Budapest, 1966).

== Sources ==
- Magyar Életrajzi Lexikon 1000–1990
- Egyetemes Lexikon, Officina Nova Kiadó (1994).

Political offices
| Preceded by post created | Minister of Culture; 1949–1953 | Succeeded by József Darvas |
