= Bisse, Hungary =

Bisse
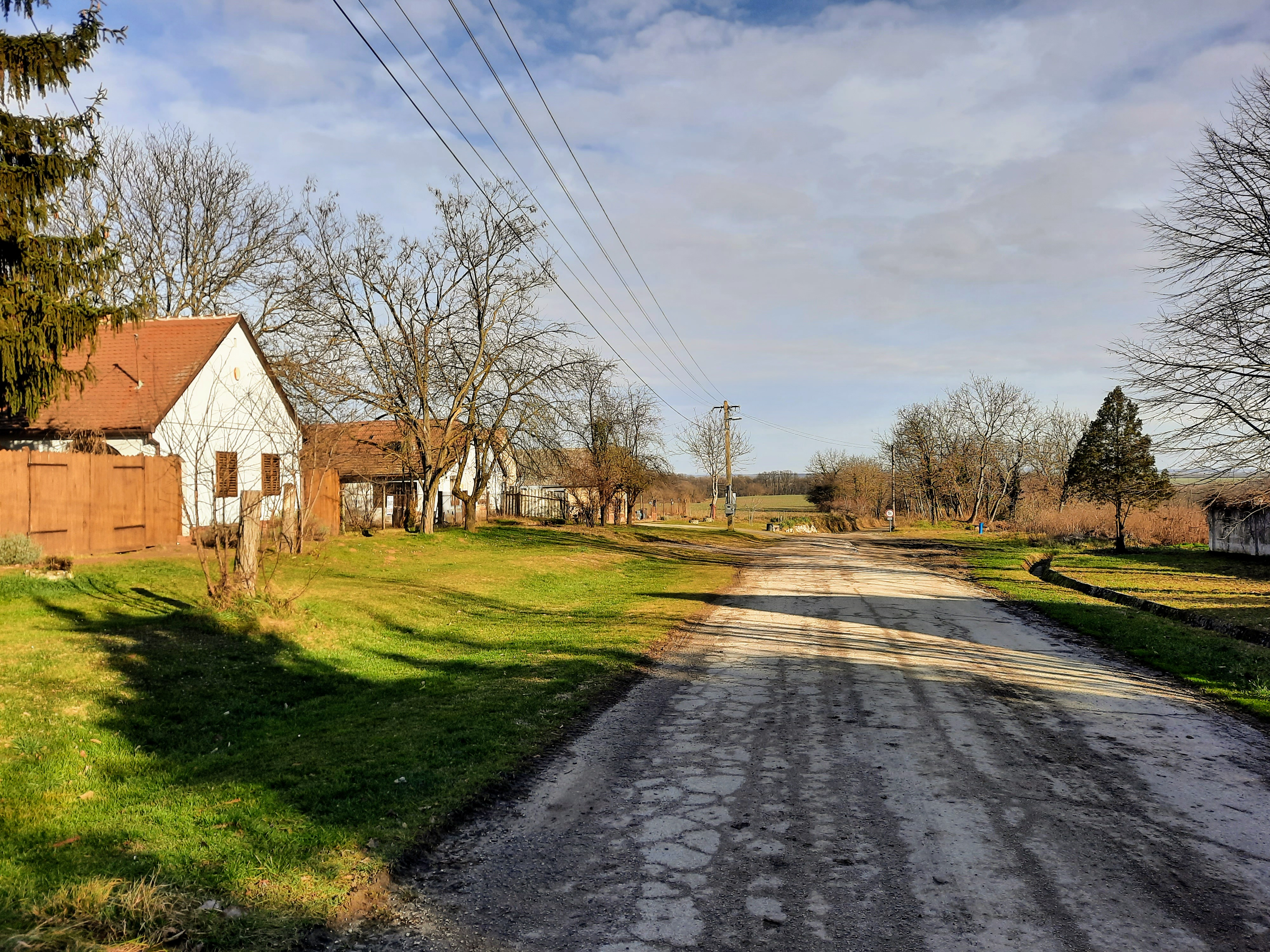

- Seal

- Location of Baranya county in Hungary

- Location of Bisse
- Coordinates: 45.90812°N 18.26222°E
- Country: Hungary
- County: Baranya

Government
  - Mayor: Bausz Sándor (Ind.)

Area
  - Total: 13.8 km^{2} (5.3 sq mi)

Population (2022)
  - Total: 208
  - Density: 15.1/km^{2} (39.0/sq mi)
- Time zone: UTC+1 (CET)
  - Summer (DST): UTC+2 (CEST)
- Postal code: 7811
- Area code: 72

Bisse (German: Bissing) is a village in Baranya county, Hungary.
