= Csillagerőd =

19th-century fort and Holocaust-era internment camp in Komárom, Hungary

- Komárom, Hungary
- Csillagerőd at Komárom

Site information
- Type: Star fort
- Open to the public: Yes
- Condition: Restored

Site history
- Built: 1850–1871

Csillagerőd (Star Fortress), also known as Fort Csillag or the Star Fort, is a nineteenth-century star fort in Komárom, Hungary, on the southern bank of the Danube. It forms part of the extensive system of fortifications surrounding the historic twin cities of Komárom and present-day Komárno, Slovakia. The present fort was constructed principally between 1850 and 1871 as part of a major Habsburg military fortification programme.

During the final months of the Second World War, Csillagerőd became a military internment, collection and transit camp. Following the Arrow Cross Party seizure of power in October 1944, Hungarian authorities confined political prisoners, Jews, foreign nationals, prisoners transferred from other detention facilities and several thousand Roma in the fort before many were handed over to German authorities and deported for forced labour in Nazi concentration camps.

Csillagerőd became one of the principal sites of the Romani Holocaust in Hungary. Contemporary reports indicate that between 6,000 and 7,000 prisoners were confined there simultaneously by the middle of November 1944, while the International Holocaust Remembrance Alliance estimates that about 10,000 people, including thousands of Roma, were taken to the Star Fort from November onwards. Hundreds died at Komárom from starvation, disease, exposure and the conditions of imprisonment. The precise number of deaths is unknown because complete prisoner and death registers have not survived.

Mass deportations from the fort continued until late December 1944. Prisoners were transported to camps including Dachau, Flossenbürg, Buchenwald, Ravensbrück, Sachsenhausen, Bergen-Belsen and Mauthausen.

After several decades of other uses, the fort was restored and converted into an exhibition centre associated with the Museum of Fine Arts, Budapest. It reopened to the public in October 2021 and houses a large part of the museum's collection of historic plaster casts.

== Fortification history ==
A fortified bridgehead had existed on the southern side of the Danube at Komárom before the construction of the present Csillagerőd. Its star-shaped position protected the river crossing and formed part of the defences of the strategically important fortress of Komárom.

The fort played a role during the Hungarian Revolution and War of Independence of 1848–1849. Hungarian forces strengthened it under the direction of Ignác Török, and artillery positioned there participated in the fighting around Komárom in April 1849.

After the surrender of Komárom in October 1849, the existing fortifications on the southern bank were extensively rebuilt. Csillagerőd was largely demolished and reconstructed in stone and brick between approximately 1850 and 1870–1871 as part of a much larger ring of permanent fortifications.

The resulting Komárom fortress system included Csillagerőd, Fort Monostor and Fort Igmánd on the Hungarian side of the river, together with the Old and New Fortresses and related defensive lines in present-day Komárno. The fortification complex was one of the largest military installations of the Habsburg monarchy.

Csillagerőd takes its name from its geometric plan. Its outer defensive system consists of projecting positions connected by masonry walls and protected by a deep ditch. A casemated barracks complex occupies its interior.

The Austro-Hungarian military used the fort principally as barracks and storage space. After the Treaty of Trianon placed the southern part of Komárom in Hungary, the Royal Hungarian Army used Csillagerőd as an ammunition depot. Further alterations for ammunition storage were undertaken beginning in 1939.

== Second World War ==
=== Distinction from Fort Monostor ===
The different forts at Komárom performed different functions during the Holocaust, and Csillagerőd is sometimes confused with nearby Fort Monostor.

Following the German occupation of Hungary on 19 March 1944, the Hungarian authorities established a ghetto for Jews from Komárom and surrounding districts. In June, thousands of Jews from Komárom, Tata, Kisbér, Esztergom and other communities were concentrated principally in Fort Monostor, rather than Csillagerőd.

Two transports leaving Komárom on 13 and 16 June 1944 carried approximately 5,463 Jews to Auschwitz-Birkenau. The International Holocaust Remembrance Alliance likewise identifies Fort Monostor as the principal Komárom site used for the concentration of Jews before these summer deportations.

Csillagerőd assumed its principal role as an internment and deportation centre later in 1944.

=== Creation of the internment and transit camp ===
On 15 October 1944, the German-backed Arrow Cross Party under Ferenc Szálasi seized power in Hungary. As the military situation deteriorated, the new government intensified arrests and offered additional Hungarian labour to Nazi Germany.

On 3 and 4 November the Szálasi government ordered a nationwide series of arrests coordinated by Department VII of the Interior Ministry under Gábor Vajna and representatives of the Defence Ministry. Csillagerőd became a principal site for holding people awaiting deportation to Germany.

Fragmentary records indicate that political prisoners, internees and detainees from Budapest prisons were already being transferred to the fort between approximately 22 and 24 October.

The wartime facility was operated as a Hungarian military internment institution. It did not form part of the formal SS concentration-camp system, although German security organisations participated in the selection and transfer of prisoners and received deportees after their handover by Hungarian authorities.

=== Prisoner population ===
The population of Csillagerőd was heterogeneous. Prisoners included:

- political detainees transferred from prisons around Hungary;
- surviving participants and prisoners connected with the Sátoraljaújhely prison uprising;
- Communists, Social Democrats and trade-union activists;
- officials of the pre-Arrow Cross Hungarian government considered hostile to the new regime;
- anti-Nazi clergy and other religious figures;
- Jews who had escaped from Hungarian labour-service units or from forced marches towards Hegyeshalom;
- foreign nationals awaiting deportation;
- prisoners of war and suspected partisans;
- people classified by the police as politically or socially "unreliable"; and
- Roma, often deported to the fort with entire families.

Prisoners were transferred from institutions including Vác, Székesfehérvár, Márianosztra and Sátoraljaújhely. Some had previously been held at internment facilities which were evacuated as the Eastern Front approached Hungary.

By the middle of November, reports from the Komárom police chief indicate that approximately 6,000 to 7,000 prisoners were confined in the underground rooms and other spaces of the fort. Prisoners who could not be accommodated inside were forced to remain outdoors.

The International Holocaust Remembrance Alliance estimates that about 10,000 people were brought to Csillagerőd from November 1944 onwards, including several thousand Roma.

== Persecution of the Roma ==
Csillagerőd became the most important central collection site for Roma rounded up in western and central Hungary during the final months of 1944.

Organised mass arrests of Roma intensified after the Arrow Cross seizure of power. Police, gendarmes and Arrow Cross formations conducted raids in a number of counties, particularly in western Hungary. Families were initially concentrated in local collection sites and then transported by train, lorry or forced march to Komárom.

Szabolcs Szita identified Roma transported to Csillagerőd from areas including Csallóköz and the counties of Baranya, Fejér, Győr-Moson-Sopron, Komárom-Esztergom, Tolna, Zala and Vas. Roma were also seized in Budapest and its suburbs, although the Óbuda brickworks served as another principal collection point for Roma from the capital.

The Hungarian National Archives has subsequently reconstructed the identities and deportation routes of Hungarian Roma using Hungarian archival material together with prisoner records held by the Arolsen Archives. Identified Hungarian Roma deportees were imprisoned not only in Dachau but also in Buchenwald, Bergen-Belsen, Mauthausen, Natzweiler, Ravensbrück and their satellite camps.

Roma from territories of southern Slovakia which had been annexed to Hungary under the First Vienna Award were also imprisoned at Csillagerőd. A 2025 study in the Journal of Genocide Research notes that hundreds of Roma from these formerly Czechoslovak territories were interned in the Star Fort in November 1944; some died there from typhus, while others were deported onward to Nazi concentration camps.

Unlike most other prisoner groups, Roma were frequently imprisoned as complete families, including children. Those regarded as capable of labour were selected for deportation to Germany. Elderly people, mothers with children and some people considered unfit for work were at times released, although the process was inconsistent and many died either at Komárom or while attempting to return home.

The absence of complete records makes the total number of Roma confined at Csillagerőd impossible to establish precisely. Holocaust institutions and historians generally describe the number as several thousand.

== Conditions and deaths ==
Csillagerőd had not been designed to accommodate thousands of prisoners. Many detainees were confined in underground or semi-basement casemates which lacked adequate doors, windows, beds, sanitation and heating.

Water supplies were inadequate, washing facilities were virtually nonexistent and latrines were insufficient for the camp population. Severe overcrowding, cold and poor sanitation contributed to outbreaks of infectious disease.

Conditions were particularly severe for the Roma population. Families often arrived already weakened by previous detention and forced journeys. Food was insufficient, and prisoners lacked basic utensils, bedding and medical care. Disease, including typhus and diarrhoeal illnesses, spread through the camp.

Survivor testimony collected by historians records the deaths of children from hunger and disease and the deaths of women and newborn children following childbirth without medical assistance.

Szita concluded that hundreds of Roma died from conditions inside the fort, but noted that neither complete death records nor birth registers have survived and therefore the exact death toll cannot be established. The International Holocaust Remembrance Alliance similarly states that hundreds of prisoners who remained at Komárom died because of the inhumane conditions.

== Selections and deportations ==
The Arrow Cross government intended the Komárom internment system in part to provide forced labour for Nazi Germany. Selection according to perceived fitness for labour therefore became a central feature of the camp.

German-language forms were prepared for prisoners selected for transfer. Categories included convicted or suspected political opponents and Roma, whom Nazi racial ideology classified as "asocial". German security authorities approved the transfers, while Hungarian officials carried out much of the arrest, registration, guarding and transportation.

Political prisoners from Sátoraljaújhely were among those selected for deportation in early November. A group of female prisoners was removed on the night of 10 November and subsequently transferred through Dachau to Bergen-Belsen.

One documented transport which reached Dachau on 14 November 1944 contained 1,512 men. The group included 175 Roma, 200 Jews and 482 Hungarian political prisoners.

Another transport of approximately 1,200 prisoners travelled from Komárom through Hegyeshalom and Germany to Flossenbürg concentration camp, arriving on 18 November.

During the second half of November and December the rate of deportation increased. Prisoners from Komárom were incorporated into transports to camps including Dachau, Flossenbürg, Buchenwald, Sachsenhausen, Ravensbrück and Bergen-Belsen.

Research in Dachau's prisoner registers identified 1,126 Roma from Hungary. Many arrived between 14 and 20 November 1944, although the surviving documentation does not establish that every Hungarian Roma prisoner recorded at Dachau had passed through Csillagerőd. Of the 1,126 identified in Dachau records, Szita reported that 161 died there, 818 were transferred to other camps and 144 were liberated towards the end of the war.

Other prisoners were transferred onwards from initial camps to satellite labour camps associated with German armaments production.

== Evacuation and end of the camp ==
The advance of Soviet forces towards Komárom increasingly disrupted the deportation system in December 1944.

Mass deportations from Csillagerőd largely ended around 27 December 1944, by which time Soviet forces had approached Dunaalmás.

During the evacuation, some Roma women, children and others deemed unable to work were driven northwards through Dunaszerdahely towards Galánta. Survivor accounts indicate that some groups were eventually released and attempted to return home. Other prisoners, particularly families with children, were released directly from Komárom without food, documents or transportation.

The military tribunal operating at Csillagerőd appears to have continued functioning into January 1945, although the precise date on which the detention facility finally ceased operating is unclear. The International Holocaust Remembrance Alliance describes the camp as closing in early 1945.

== Post-war use ==
In the summer of 1945, Csillagerőd was again temporarily used as an internment camp, this time for captured members of the Arrow Cross movement.

The fort later ceased to have a major military function. Emergency accommodation was established in parts of the complex after the war, and it was subsequently used by a local consumer co-operative for the storage of vegetables and other goods.

The wider Komárom fortification system remained partly in military use during the Cold War. Fort Monostor became a major Soviet ammunition depot, while Csillagerőd and Fort Igmánd were used for other purposes.

The forts were registered as Hungarian national monuments in the early 1990s, and parts of the Komárom fortification system were subsequently opened to the public.

== Commemoration ==
Public commemoration of the victims imprisoned at Csillagerőd developed gradually.

In 1985, the local authorities installed a plaque commemorating the "victims of the Star Fort". A separate plaque specifically commemorating victims of the Roma genocide was installed in 2004. A further Holocaust memorial plaque was placed at the site in 2014.

Roma organisations have also held annual or periodic commemorations at the fort around Roma Holocaust Memorial Day on 2 August.

The history of the camp has become an important subject in scholarship on the Romani Holocaust. Katalin Katz devoted a study to survivor memory of the Komárom camp in the 2007 academic collection The Roma – A Minority in Europe, while Szabolcs Szita's research reconstructed the prisoner population, conditions and deportation system from archival records and survivor accounts.

== Restoration and museum ==
A major restoration and extension of Csillagerőd was undertaken as part of the Liget Budapest Project. Plans for the original nineteenth-century fort discovered in the military archives in Vienna were used during the conservation work.

The project restored the historic gun positions, masonry and earthworks while adding new exhibition, educational and visitor facilities. The resulting cultural complex has more than 7,000 square metres (75,000 sq ft) of floor area.

The restored fort formally opened as a museum and cultural centre in October 2021. Its permanent exhibition contains approximately 300 plaster casts of ancient, medieval and Renaissance sculpture from the collection of the Museum of Fine Arts in Budapest.

A 2022 review in The Burlington Magazine praised the restoration and exhibition but noted that Csillagerőd's wartime use as a collection point for Jews, Roma and political prisoners was mentioned only briefly within the museum display, with the history commemorated more substantially by plaques outside the building.

== See also ==
- The Holocaust in Hungary
- Kistarcsa internment camp

== Sources ==
- Szita, Szabolcs (2007). "One of the Roma Killing Fields: Komáromi Csillagerőd, Autumn 1944". In Bársony, János; Daróczi, Ágnes (eds.). Pharrajimos: The Fate of the Roma During the Holocaust (PDF). New York: International Debate Education Association. pp. 98–114. ISBN 978-1-932716-30-6.
- Katz, Katalin (2007). "Story, History and Memory: A Case Study of the Roma at the Komarom Camp in Hungary". In Stauber, Roni; Vago, Raphael (eds.). The Roma – A Minority in Europe: Historical, Political and Social Perspectives. Central European University Press. pp. 69–87. ISBN 978-963-7326-86-8.
