= Lajos Dinnyés =

Hungarian politician

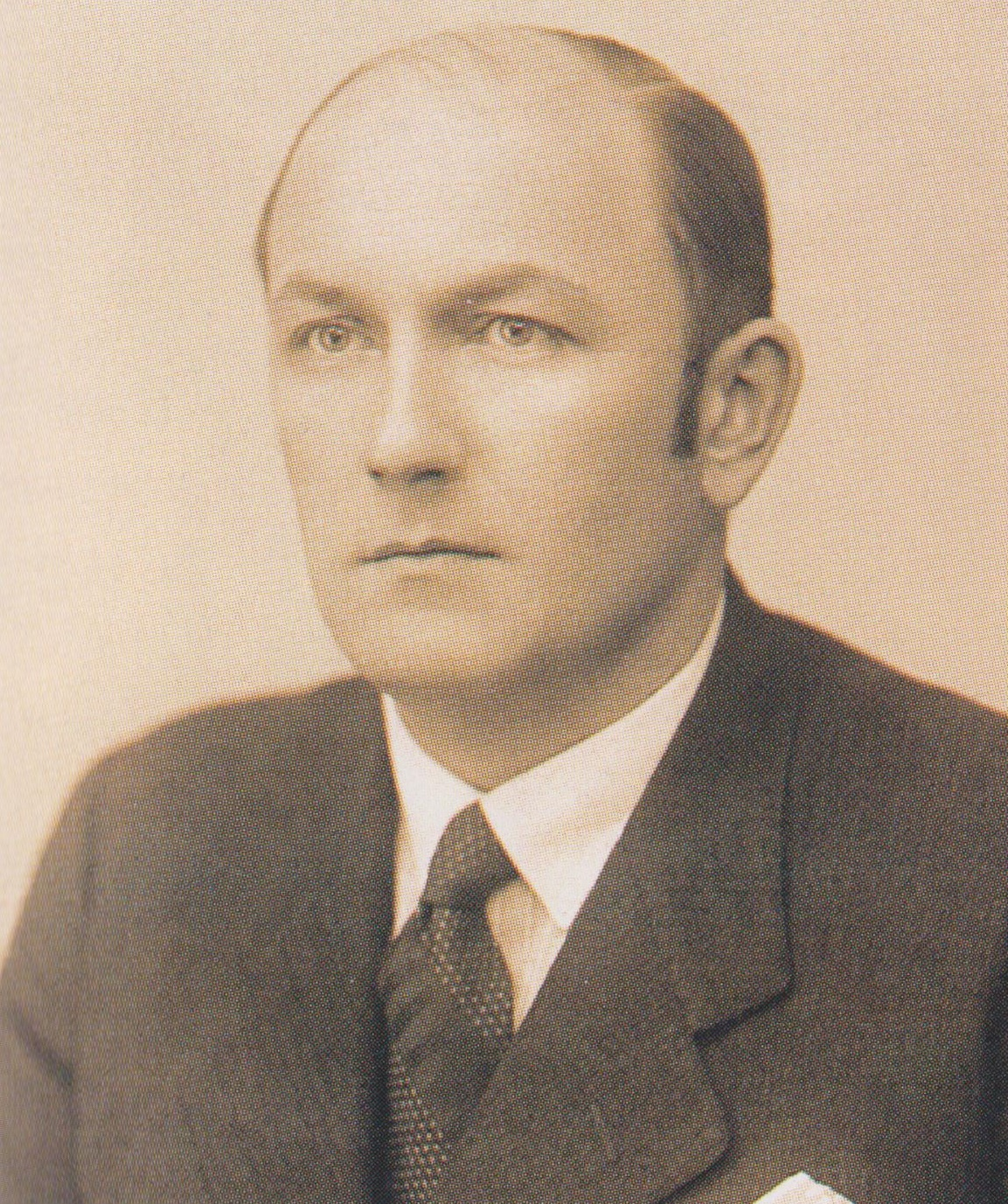
- Dinnyés in the 1930s

Prime Minister of Hungary
- In office 31 May 1947 – 10 December 1948
- President: Zoltán Tildy Árpád Szakasits
- Deputy: Mátyás Rákosi Árpád Szakasits
- Preceded by: Ferenc Nagy
- Succeeded by: István Dobi

Minister of Defence of Hungary
- In office 14 March 1947 – 24 September 1947
- Prime Minister: Ferenc Nagy Himself
- Preceded by: Albert Bartha
- Succeeded by: Péter Veres

Personal details
- Born: 16 April 1901 Alsódabas, Kingdom of Hungary, Austria-Hungary
- Died: 3 May 1961 (aged 60) Budapest, Hungarian People's Republic
- Party: Independent Smallholders' Party

Lajos Dinnyés (16 April 1901 – 3 May 1961) was a Hungarian politician of the Smallholders Party who served as the first pro-communist Prime Minister of the Second Hungarian Republic from 1947 to 1948.

== Biography ==
He came from a well to do titled family and finished high school at Budapest Reformed Gimnazium. He finished studies at Keszthely Academy, earning a degree in agriculture. Following his father's death he looked after the family property in 1930.

He became a member of the Agrarian Party in 1929, subsequently representing the Smallholders Party after their merger in 1930. Between 1931 and 1938, he served as a Member of Parliament representing Alsódabas.

He married in 1941, held a civil post and served for a short term in the army. He returned to public life in 1945 when the Smallholders Party was reformed.

In March 1947, he became Minister of Defence in the government of Ferenc Nagy, the leader of the Smallholders Party. When Soviet-backed communists forced the Prime Minister into exile on 30 May 1947, Dinnyés was appointed as successor. In the so-called "Blue Papers Election" on 31 August 1947, the Smallholders Party came in second surpassed by the Communists. Dinnyés remained in office as Prime Minister until 1948, but merely served as an obedient puppet in the hands of the deputy premier, Communist Party boss Mátyás Rákosi. While Dinnyés nominally headed the government, Rákosi laid the foundations of the communist dictatorship by nationalizing factories, banks and denominational schools. In December 1948, the Communists used the emigration of the treasurer Miklós Nyárádi as an excuse to push out Dinnyés altogether and replace him with the fellow traveller István Dobi.

He later became the director of the National Library of Agriculture and vice president of Parliament. During the Hungarian Revolution of 1956 he was a member of the Interim National Assembly.

Political offices
Preceded by Albert Bartha	Minister of Defence; 1947	Succeeded by Péter Veres
Preceded by Ferenc Nagy	Prime Minister of Hungary; 1947–1948	Succeeded by István Dobi
