= Zoltán Tildy =

President of Hungary (1889–1961)

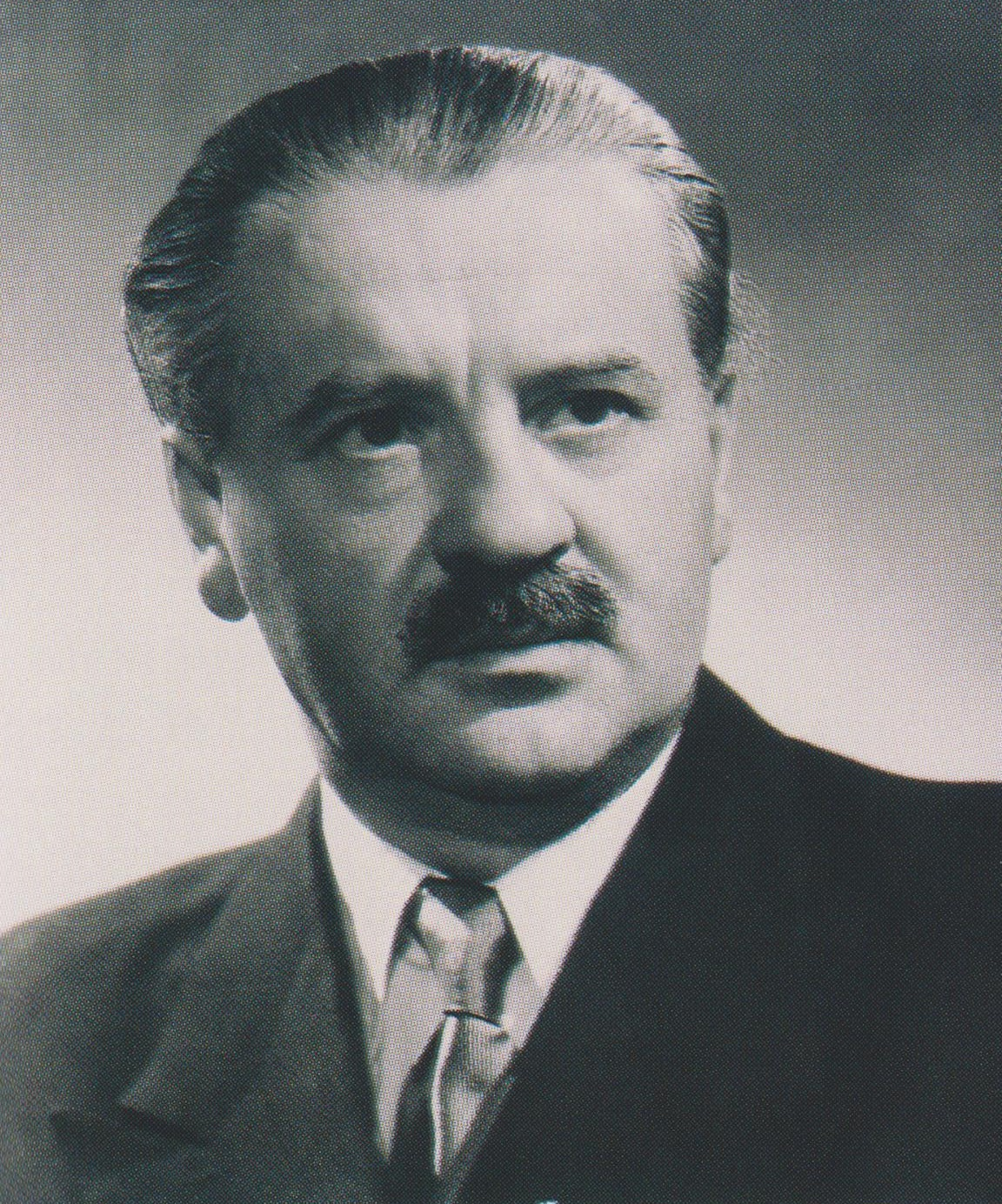
- Tildy in 1946

President of the Hungarian Republic
- In office 1 February 1946 – 3 August 1948
- Prime Minister: Ferenc Nagy Mátyás Rákosi (acting) Lajos Dinnyés
- Preceded by: High National Council
- Succeeded by: Árpád Szakasits

Prime Minister of the Kingdom of Hungary
- In office 15 November 1945 – 1 February 1946
- Monarch: Vacant
- Head of State: High National Council
- Preceded by: Béla Miklós
- Succeeded by: Ferenc Nagy

Deputy Prime Minister of Hungary
- De facto
- In office 27 October 1956 – 4 November 1956
- Prime Minister: Imre Nagy
- Preceded by: Antal Apró
- Succeeded by: Ferenc Münnich

Minister of State
- In office 27 October 1956 – 4 November 1956
- Prime Minister: Imre Nagy

Member of the High National Council
- In office 7 December 1945 – 1 February 1946 Serving with Ferenc Nagy, László Rajk, and Béla Varga (to 8 January 1946)
- Preceded by: Béla Miklós Béla Zsedényi Mátyás Rákosi
- Succeeded by: Himself as President of the Republic

Personal details
- Born: 18 November 1889 Losonc, Nógrád County, Kingdom of Hungary (today Lučenec, Slovakia)
- Died: 3 August 1961 (aged 71) Budapest, Hungarian People's Republic
- Party: Independent Smallholders' Party
- Spouse: Erzsébet Gyenis
- Children: Zoltán Tildy, Jr. Erzsébet; László
- Profession: Minister

Zoltán Tildy (Note: Hungarian pronunciation: [ˈzoltaːn ˈtildi]) (18 November 1889 – 3 August 1961) was a Hungarian politician and statesman who served as prime minister of Hungary from 1945 to 1946 and president from 1946 until 1948 in the post-war period before the seizure of power by Soviet-backed communists.

== Biography ==
=== Early life and family ===
Zoltán Tildy was born in Losonc (Lučenec now in Slovakia), in the Austro-Hungarian Empire to the family of a Hungarian official in the local government. He took a degree in theology from the Reformed Theological Academy in Pápa, afterwards spending a year studying at Assembly's College, Belfast, in Ireland. Tildy served as an active minister of the Reformed Church beginning in 1921, and edited the daily paper of the Reformed church in Hungary, the Keresztény Család (Christian Family), as well as other periodicals. In 1929, Tildy joined the Independent Smallholders' Party (FKgP) with other noted Hungarian political figures, including Ferenc Nagy. He became executive vice-president of the organization soon afterwards.

He married Erzsébet Gyenis (1896–1985) in 1916 and had three children: Zoltán Tildy, Jr. (1917–1994), Erzsébet Tildy (1918–2012), and László Tildy (1921–1983).

=== Political career and later life ===
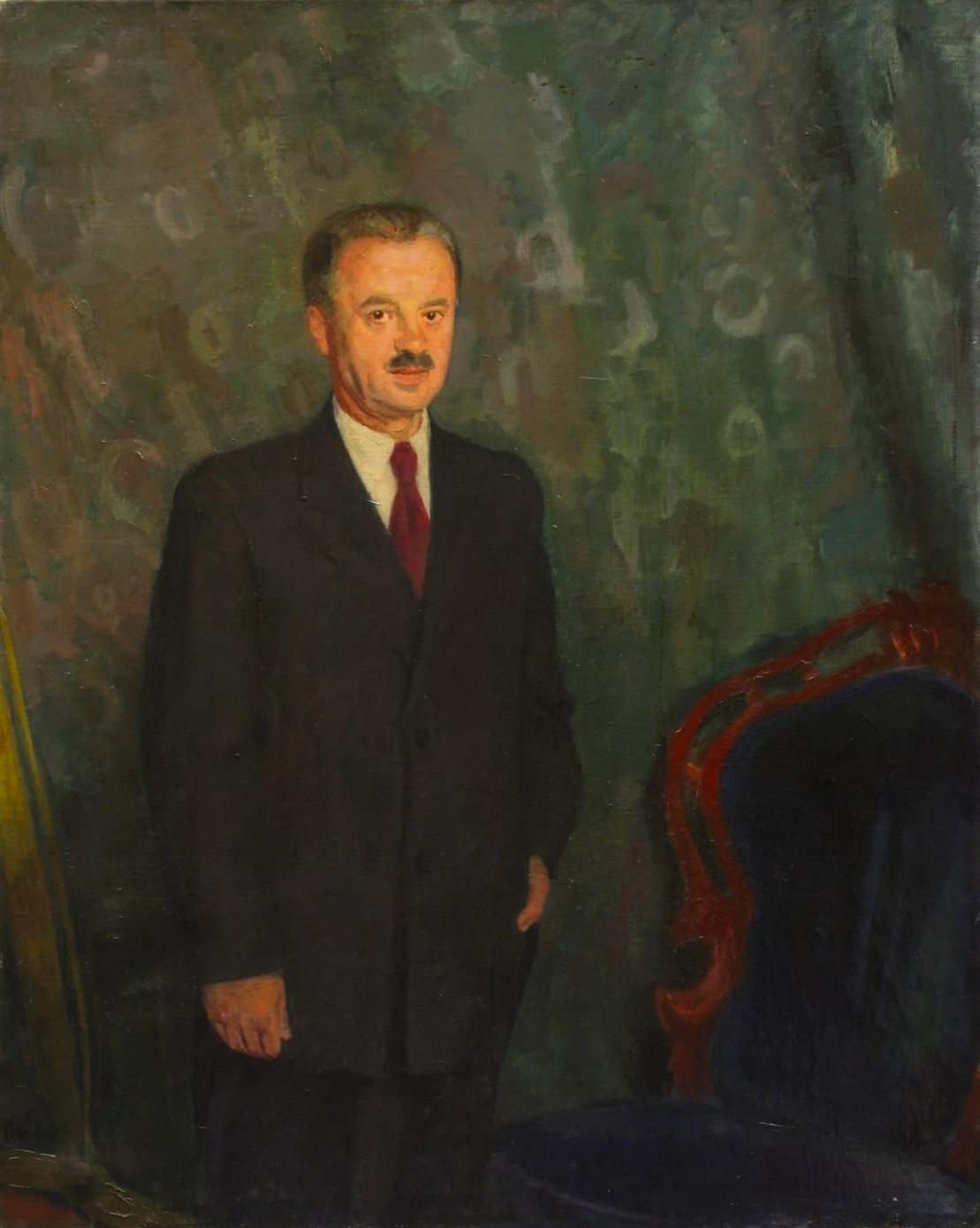
Portrait painting by Róbert Berény

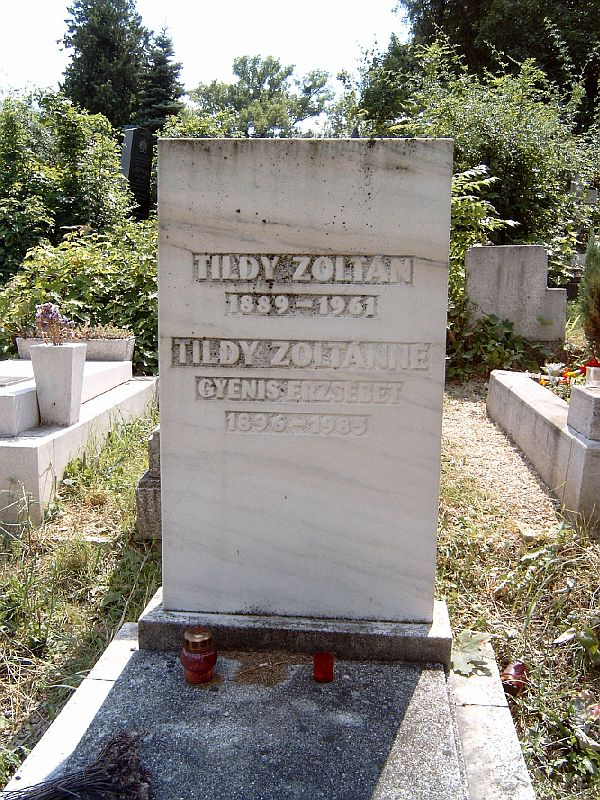
Grave of Zoltán Tildy and his wife, Erzsébet Gyenis in Budapest.

Tildy was elected to the Hungarian parliament in 1933, being reelected in 1936 and 1939. He put pressure on Horthy's government to pull out of the Second World War. After Hungary was occupied by the Germans, Tildy was forced into hiding. When the Soviets occupied Hungary and drove out the Germans, Tildy became leader of the FKgP and was appointed Prime Minister of Hungary, serving from 15 November 1945 until 1 February 1946, when he was elected President of Hungary. Tildy was an ex officio member of the High National Council from 7 December 1945 until 2 February 1946.

Serving as the first President of the Republic of Hungary when he was forced to resign in July 1948 after allegations emerged about his son-in-law being arrested for corruption and adultery. Tildy was held under house arrest in Budapest until May 1, 1956. He was appointed to the position of a state minister in the coalition government during the 1956 Hungarian Revolution, and was eventually arrested by Soviet forces after the revolution was crushed by Warsaw Pact intervention. On 15 June 1958 Tildy was sentenced by the Supreme Court to six years' imprisonment, in the trial of Imre Nagy and associates. However, he was released under an individual amnesty in April 1959 in view of his advanced years (in fact due to illness). He then lived in complete retirement until he died in Budapest on 3 August 1961.

Political offices
Preceded by Béla Miklós	Prime Minister of Hungary; 1945–1946	Succeeded by Ferenc Nagy
Preceded by High National Council	President of Hungary; 1946–1948	Succeeded by Árpád Szakasits
