= 1441 Bolyai =

Asteroid

Discovery
- Discovered by: G. Kulin
- Discovery site: Konkoly Obs.
- Discovery date: 26 November 1937

Designations
- Named after: János Bolyai (Hungarian mathematician)
- Alternative designations: 1937 WA
- Minor planet category: main-belt · (middle)

Orbital characteristics
- Epoch 4 September 2017 (JD 2458000.5)
- Uncertainty parameter 0
- Observation arc: 79.57 yr (29,064 days)
- Aphelion: 3.2591 AU
- Perihelion: 2.0031 AU
- Semi-major axis: 2.6311 AU
- Eccentricity: 0.2387
- Orbital period (sidereal): 4.27 yr (1,559 days)
- Mean anomaly: 287.12°
- Mean motion: 0° 13^{m} 51.24^{s} / day
- Inclination: 13.918°
- Longitude of ascending node: 254.02°
- Argument of perihelion: 116.01°

Physical characteristics
- Dimensions: 12.31±3.67 km 13.50±3.27 km 14.65±6.43 km 14.75 km (derived); 14.76±1.4 km (IRAS:2)
- Geometric albedo: 0.0426 (derived); 0.0467±0.011 (IRAS:2); 0.047±0.101; 0.05±0.03; 0.05±0.07
- Spectral type: (S)/C (assumed)
- Absolute magnitude (H): 13.1 · 13.2 · 13.35

1441 Bolyai, provisional designation 1937 WA, is a dark asteroid from the central region of the asteroid belt, approximately 13 kilometers in diameter. It was discovered on 26 November 1937, by Hungarian astronomer György Kulin at Konkoly Observatory in Budapest, Hungary. The asteroid was named after Hungarian mathematician János Bolyai.

== Orbit and classification ==
Bolyai orbits the Sun in the central main-belt at a distance of 2.0–3.3 AU once every 4 years and 3 months (1,559 days). Its orbit has an eccentricity of 0.24 and an inclination of 14° with respect to the ecliptic. Bolyai's observation arc begins the night following its official discovery observation in 1937, as no precoveries were taken, and no prior identifications were made.

== Physical characteristics ==
According to the surveys carried out by the Infrared Astronomical Satellite IRAS, and NASA's Wide-field Infrared Survey Explorer with its subsequent NEOWISE mission, Bolyai measures between 12.31 and 14.76 kilometers in diameter, and its surface has an albedo between 0.047 and 0.05.

The Collaborative Asteroid Lightcurve Link (CALL) derives an albedo of 0.0426 and a diameter of 14.75 kilometers with an absolute magnitude of 13.2. For asteroids with a semi-major axis between 2.6 and 2.7 AU, the probability of an asteroid being either of a stony (albedo of 0.20) or of a carbonaceous (albedo of 0.057) composition is considered equally likely by CALL (which then uses an albedo of 0.10 as a compromise value between the two main types). In the case of Bolyai, however, the space-based albedo measurements suggest that it is most likely of a carbonaceous composition.

=== Lightcurve ===
As of 2017, no rotational lightcurve of Bolyai has been obtained. Its rotation period, composition and shape remain unknown.

== Naming ==
This minor planet was named after the Hungarian mathematician János Bolyai (1802–1860), a co-founder of non-Euclidean geometry in the early 19th century. Naming citation was first mentioned in The Names of the Minor Planets by Paul Herget in 1955 (H 130) and a clarification of the naming is given in a paper published in Journal of Astronomical History and Heritage in 2012.
