= 1444 Pannonia =

Carbonaceous background asteroid

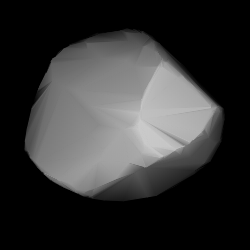
- Modelled shape of Pannonia from its lightcurve

Discovery
- Discovered by: G. Kulin
- Discovery site: Konkoly Obs.
- Discovery date: 6 January 1938

Designations
- Pronunciation: /pəˈnoʊniə/
- Named after: Pannonia (ancient province)
- Alternative designations: 1938 AE
- Minor planet category: main-belt · (outer)

Orbital characteristics
- Epoch 16 February 2017 (JD 2457800.5)
- Uncertainty parameter 0
- Observation arc: 78.23 yr (28,575 days)
- Aphelion: 3.5915 AU
- Perihelion: 2.7128 AU
- Semi-major axis: 3.1521 AU
- Eccentricity: 0.1394
- Orbital period (sidereal): 5.60 yr (2,044 days)
- Mean anomaly: 268.73°
- Mean motion: 0° 10^{m} 33.96^{s} / day
- Inclination: 17.761°
- Longitude of ascending node: 303.33°
- Argument of perihelion: 310.87°

Physical characteristics
- Mean diameter: 26.363±0.141 km 27.14 km (derived); 28±3 km 28.3±2.8 km 29.20±2.2 km 30.48±0.53 km 30.92±9.63 km 31.49±9.20 km
- Synodic rotation period: 6.2±0.1 h 6.205±0.003 h 10.756±0.006 h
- Geometric albedo: 0.04±0.02; 0.05±0.06; 0.0501 (derived); 0.053±0.005; 0.07±0.01; 0.070±0.003; 0.4748±0.081
- Spectral type: C
- Absolute magnitude (H): 9.10 · 11.10 · 11.18±0.62 · 11.30 · 11.4 · 11.7 · 11.73

1444 Pannonia (prov. designation: 1938 AE) is a carbonaceous background asteroid from the outer region of the asteroid belt, approximately 29 kilometers (18 miles) in diameter. It was discovered on 6 January 1938, by Hungarian astronomer György Kulin at Konkoly Observatory in Budapest, Hungary. It was named after the ancient province of the Roman Empire, Pannonia.

== Orbit and classification ==
Pannonia is a non-family asteroid of the main belt's background population when applying the hierarchical clustering method to its proper orbital elements. It orbits the Sun at a distance of 2.7–3.6 AU once every 5 years and 7 months (2,044 days). Its orbit has an eccentricity of 0.14 and an inclination of 18° with respect to the ecliptic. Pannonia's observation arc begins 3 weeks after its official discovery at Konkoly, as no precoveries were taken, and no prior identifications were made.

== Naming ==
This minor planet was named for Pannonia, an ancient province of the Roman Empire, which was partially located over the territory of the present-day western Hungary. The official naming citation was published by the Minor Planet Center on 1 February 1980 (M.P.C. 5183).

== Physical characteristics ==
=== Rotation period ===
In April 2001, astronomer Colin Bembrick obtained the first rotational lightcurve of Pannonia at Tarana Observatory (431) in Australia. Lightcurve analysis gave a well-defined rotation period of 10.756 hours with a brightness amplitude of 0.16 magnitude (U=3). In 2002 and 2004, photometric observations by French astronomers Laurent Bernasconi and Bernard Christophe Additional periods of 6.2 and 6.205 hours with an amplitude of 0.57 and 0.37, respectively (U=2-/2).

=== Diameter and albedo ===
According to the surveys carried out by the Infrared Astronomical Satellite IRAS, the Japanese Akari satellite, and NASA's Wide-field Infrared Survey Explorer with its subsequent NEOWISE mission, Pannonia measures between 26.36 and 31.49 kilometers in diameter, and its surface has an albedo between 0.04 and 0.47. The Collaborative Asteroid Lightcurve Link derives an albedo of 0.0501 and a diameter of 27.14 kilometers with an absolute magnitude of 11.7.
