= 7317 Cabot =

Main-belt asteroid

Discovery
- Discovered by: G. Kulin
- Discovery site: Konkoly
- Discovery date: 12 March 1940

Designations
- Named after: John Cabot (Italian explorer)
- Alternative designations: 1940 ED · 1983 JH; 1987 OV_{1}
- Minor planet category: main-belt · (inner) background · Flora

Orbital characteristics
- Epoch 23 March 2018 (JD 2458200.5)
- Uncertainty parameter 0
- Observation arc: 34.79 yr (12,706 d)
- Aphelion: 2.6836 AU
- Perihelion: 1.9780 AU
- Semi-major axis: 2.3308 AU
- Eccentricity: 0.1514
- Orbital period (sidereal): 3.56 yr (1,300 d)
- Mean anomaly: 283.55°
- Mean motion: 0° 16^{m} 37.2^{s} / day
- Inclination: 3.9844°
- Longitude of ascending node: 182.64°
- Argument of perihelion: 54.312°

Physical characteristics
- Mean diameter: 3.62 km (calculated); 3.66±0.86 km 5.363±0.257 km
- Synodic rotation period: 2.237±0.0003 h
- Geometric albedo: 0.185±0.034; 0.24±0.12; 0.24 (assumed)
- Spectral type: S (assumed)
- Absolute magnitude (H): 13.8; 13.922±0.003 (R); 14.0; 14.08±1.52; 14.33; 14.37

7317 Cabot, provisional designation 1940 ED, is a background asteroid in a resonance with Jupiter, located the inner regions of the asteroid belt, approximately 3.6 kilometers (2.2 miles) in diameter. It was discovered on 12 March 1940, by Hungarian astronomer György Kulin at the Konkoly Observatory in Budapest. The presumed S-type asteroid has a rotation period of 2.2 hours. It was named after Italian explorer John Cabot.

== Orbit and classification ==
Cabot is located in a 10:3 orbital resonance with Jupiter (10/3J), a mean-motion resonance of moderate order and a location of orbital instability. Asteroids in these resonances are known for their chaotic orbits with a relatively short Lyapunov time. It is a non-family asteroid of the main belt's background population when applying the hierarchical clustering method to its proper orbital elements. Based on osculating Keplerian orbital elements, the asteroid has also been classified as a member of the Flora family (402), a giant asteroid family and the largest family of stony asteroids in the main-belt.

It orbits the Sun in the inner asteroid belt at a distance of 2.0–2.7 AU once every 3 years and 7 months (1,300 days; semi-major axis of 2.33 AU). Its orbit has an eccentricity of 0.15 and an inclination of 4° with respect to the ecliptic. The body's observation arc begins with its observation as 1983 JH at Klet Observatory in May 1983, or more than 43 years after to its official discovery observation at Konkoly.

== Physical characteristics ==
Cabot is assumed to be a stony S-type asteroid.

=== Rotation period ===
In January 2011, a fragmentary rotational lightcurve of Cabot was obtained from photometric observations in the R-band by astronomers at the Palomar Transient Factory in California. Lightcurve analysis gave a poorly defined rotation period of 2.237 hours with a brightness amplitude of 0.10 magnitude (U=1). As of 2018, no secure period has been published.

=== Diameter and albedo ===
According to the survey carried out by the NEOWISE mission of NASA's Wide-field Infrared Survey Explorer, Cabot measures 3.66 and 5.363 kilometers in diameter and its surface has an albedo of 0.185 and 0.24, respectively. The Collaborative Asteroid Lightcurve Link assumes an albedo of 0.24 – derived from 8 Flora, the parent body of the Flora family – and calculates a diameter of 3.62 kilometers based on an absolute magnitude of 14.37.

== Naming ==
This minor planet was named after Italian explorer John Cabot (Giovanni Caboto; c. 1450–1499), who discovered the coast of North America in 1497, the first recorded landfall since the Norse voyages. The Venetian navigator sailed from Bristol under the commission of Henry VII of England. The official naming citation was published by the Minor Planet Center on 20 June 1997 (M.P.C. 30101).
