= 2043 Ortutay =

Asteroid

Discovery
- Discovered by: G. Kulin
- Discovery site: Konkoly Obs.
- Discovery date: 12 November 1936

Designations
- Named after: Gyula Ortutay (Hungarian ethnographer)
- Alternative designations: 1936 TH · 1935 PE; 1947 TD · 1947 VA; 1951 LQ · 1952 QG; 1958 UN · 1958 XR; 1963 SN · 1969 UY; 1971 DB · 1972 HS_{1} 1974 SW_{1} · 1975 XT_{5} A908 QB
- Minor planet category: main-belt · (outer)

Orbital characteristics
- Epoch 4 September 2017 (JD 2458000.5)
- Uncertainty parameter 0
- Observation arc: 108.61 yr (39,668 days)
- Aphelion: 3.4510 AU
- Perihelion: 2.7602 AU
- Semi-major axis: 3.1056 AU
- Eccentricity: 0.1112
- Orbital period (sidereal): 5.47 yr (1,999 days)
- Mean anomaly: 282.90°
- Mean motion: 0° 10^{m} 48.36^{s} / day
- Inclination: 3.0745°
- Longitude of ascending node: 321.21°
- Argument of perihelion: 60.334°

Physical characteristics
- Dimensions: 42.13±15.15 km 44.14±15.49 km 44.69 km (derived); 48.460±0.215 km 49.32±0.90 km 54.117±0.677 km
- Synodic rotation period: 7.7475±0.0005 h
- Geometric albedo: 0.0317±0.0122; 0.036±0.002; 0.040±0.009; 0.0423 (derived); 0.05±0.02; 0.05±0.05
- Spectral type: X · C
- Absolute magnitude (H): 10.64±0.35 · 10.7 · 10.8 · 10.93

2043 Ortutay, provisional designation 1936 TH, is a dark asteroid from the outer regions of the asteroid belt, approximately 45 kilometers in diameter. The asteroid was discovered by Hungarian astronomer György Kulin at the Konkoly Observatory, Budapest, on 12 November 1936. It was named after Hungarian ethnographer Gyula Ortutay.

== Classification and orbit ==
Ortutay orbits the Sun in the outer main-belt at a distance of 2.8–3.5 AU once every 5 years and 6 months (1,999 days). Its orbit has an eccentricity of 0.11 and an inclination of 3° with respect to the ecliptic.

The asteroid was first identified as A908 QB at Heidelberg Observatory in August 1908, extending the body's observation arc by 28 years prior to its official discovery observation at Konkoly.

== Physical characteristics ==
Ortutay has been characterized as an X-type asteroid by Pan-STARRS photometric survey. The body's low albedo suggest that it is a carbonaceous C-type asteroid.

=== Rotation period ===
In December 2013, a rotational lightcurve of Ortutay was obtained from photometric observations by astronomer Kim Lang at the Klokkerholm Observatory in Denmark. Lightcurve analysis gave a rotation period of 7.7475 hours with a brightness variation of 0.44 magnitude (U=3-).

=== Diameter and albedo ===
According to the surveys carried out by the Japanese Akari satellite and the NEOWISE mission of NASA's Wide-field Infrared Survey Explorer, Ortutay measures between 42.13 and 54.117 kilometers in diameter and its surface has an albedo between 0.0317 and 0.05.

The Collaborative Asteroid Lightcurve Link derives an albedo of 0.0423 and a diameter of 44.69 kilometers based on an absolute magnitude of 10.8.

== Naming ==
This minor planet was named in memory of Hungarian Gyula Ortutay (1910–1978), a professor of ethnography and Hungarian politician, who fostered the popularization of astronomy. In the late 1940s, he was Hungary's Minister of Religion and Education. The approved naming citation was published by the Minor Planet Center on 1 February 1980 (M.P.C. 5183).
