= List of Slovenian astronomers =

A list of notable astronomers from Slovenia:

== A ==
- Anton Ambschel (1749–1821)

== B ==
- Franc Breckerfeld (1681–1744)
- Silvo Breskvar (1902–1969)

== Č ==
- Andrej Čadež (born 1942)
- Lavo Čermelj (1889–1980)

== G ==
- Andreja Gomboc (born 1969)
- Pavel Grošelj (1883–1940)
- Gabriel Gruber (1740–1805)

== H ==
- Ferdinand Augustin Hallerstein (1703–1774)

== K ==
- Josip Križan (1841–1921)
- Pavel Kunaver (1889–1988)

== P ==
- Marijan Prosen (born 1937)

== S ==
- Uros Seljak (born 1966)

== V ==
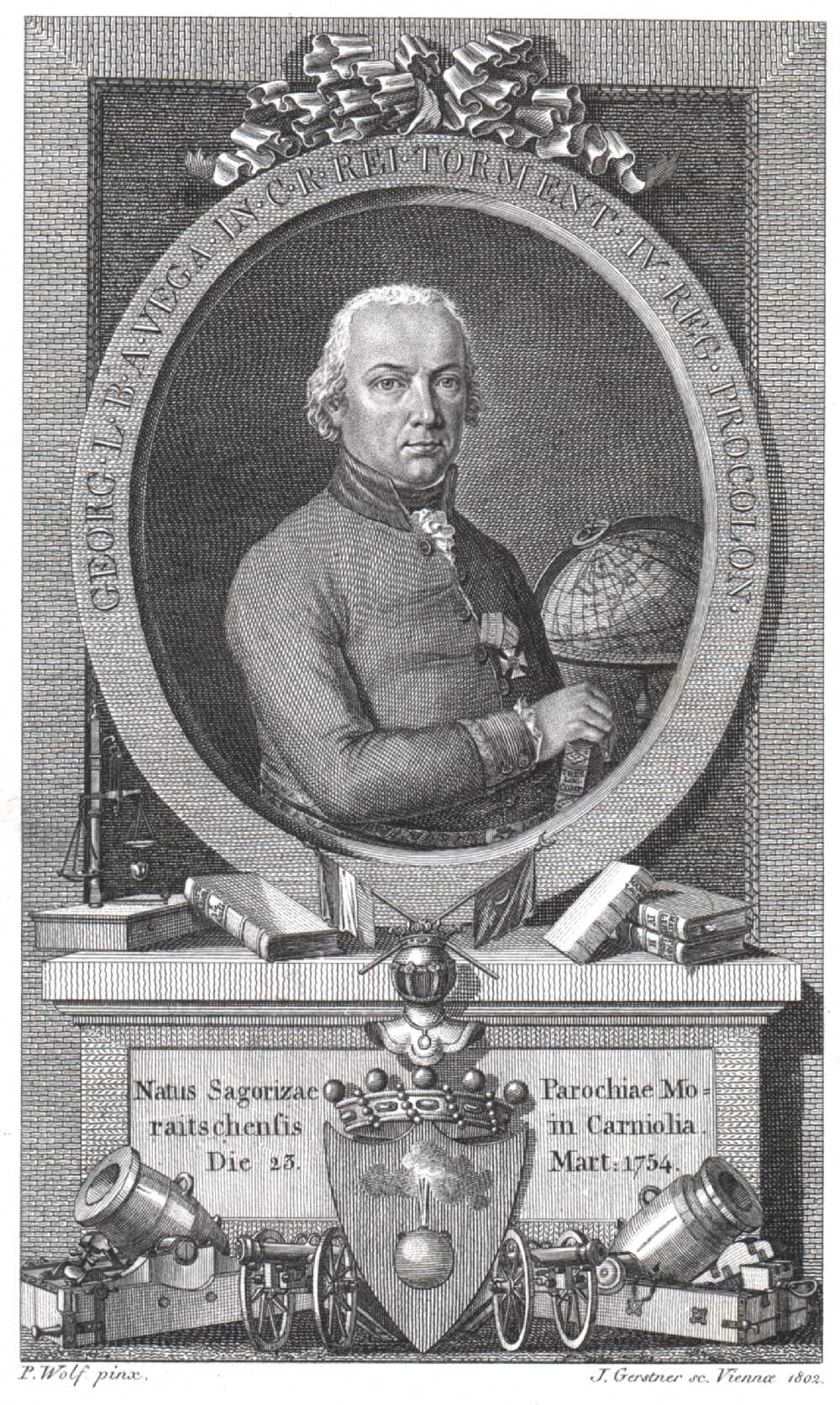
Jurij Vega

- Jurij Vega (1754–1802)
