= 1452 Hunnia =

Carbonaceous Meliboean asteroid

Discovery
- Discovered by: G. Kulin
- Discovery site: Konkoly Obs.
- Discovery date: 26 February 1938

Designations
- Pronunciation: /ˈhʌniə/
- Named after: Hungarians (Nation of Hungaria)
- Alternative designations: 1938 DZ_{1} · 1953 YA; 1953 YM
- Minor planet category: main-belt · (outer); Meliboea

Orbital characteristics
- Epoch 4 September 2017 (JD 2458000.5)
- Uncertainty parameter 0
- Observation arc: 79.35 yr (28,981 days)
- Aphelion: 3.7395 AU
- Perihelion: 2.4798 AU
- Semi-major axis: 3.1096 AU
- Eccentricity: 0.2025
- Orbital period (sidereal): 5.48 yr (2,003 days)
- Mean anomaly: 194.78°
- Mean motion: 0° 10^{m} 46.92^{s} / day
- Inclination: 14.211°
- Longitude of ascending node: 21.352°
- Argument of perihelion: 94.487°

Physical characteristics
- Dimensions: 18.76±5.25 km 20.00±6.07 km 20.910±0.107 km 21.16 km (calculated)
- Synodic rotation period: 17.2 h
- Geometric albedo: 0.0435±0.0036; 0.046±0.003; 0.05±0.07; 0.057 (assumed); 0.06±0.04
- Spectral type: C (assumed)
- Absolute magnitude (H): 12.10 · 12.19

1452 Hunnia, provisional designation 1938 DZ_{1}, is a carbonaceous Meliboean asteroid from the outer regions of the asteroid belt, approximately 20 kilometers in diameter. It was discovered on 26 February 1938, by Hungarian astronomer György Kulin at the Konkoly Observatory in Budapest. The asteroid was named in honor of the Hungarian nation.

== Orbit and classification ==
Hunnia is a member of the Meliboea family (604), a smaller asteroid family of a few hundred carbonaceous outer-belt asteroids, named after 137 Meliboea. It orbits the Sun at a distance of 2.5–3.7 AU once every 5 years and 6 months (2,003 days). Its orbit has an eccentricity of 0.20 and an inclination of 14° with respect to the ecliptic.

The body's observation arc begins at Goethe Link Observatory in March 1949, more than 11 years after its official discovery observation at Konkoly. (The large time span without astrometric follow-up observations coincides with the period of WWII.)

== Physical characteristics ==
Hunnia is an assumed carbonaceous C-type asteroid, in agreement with the overall spectral type of the Meliboea family.

=== Rotation period ===
Between February and March 1998, a rotational lightcurve of Hunnia was obtained from photometric observations by Hungarian astronomers Krisztián Sárneczky, Gyula Szabó and László Kiss. Lightcurve analysis gave a rotation period of 17.2 hours with a brightness amplitude of 0.34 magnitude (U=2). No other lightcurves have since been obtained.

=== Diameter and albedo ===
According to the survey carried out by the NEOWISE mission of NASA's Wide-field Infrared Survey Explorer, Hunnia measures between 18.76 and 20.910 kilometers in diameter and its surface has an albedo between 0.0435 and 0.06.

The Collaborative Asteroid Lightcurve Link assumes a standard albedo for carbonaceous asteroids of 0.057 and calculates a diameter of 21.16 kilometers based on an absolute magnitude of 12.1.

== Naming ==
This minor planet was named in honor of the Hungarian nation. Also known as Magyars, the Hungarians are believed to be of Hunnic heritage. The official naming citation was published by the Minor Planet Center on 1 February 1980 (M.P.C. 5182).
