= D Puppis =

The Bayer designations D Puppis and d Puppis are distinct.
For D Puppis:

- D Puppis (HR 2691, HD 54475), a bluish star.

For d Puppis:

- d^{1} Puppis (HR 2961, HD 61831), a blue dwarf star
- d^{2} Puppis (HR 2963, HD 61878), a binary star
- d^{3} Puppis (HR 2954, HD 61899), a bluish star
- d^{4} Puppis (V468 Puppis), a variable blue giant star
