= 1436 Salonta =

Main-belt asteroid

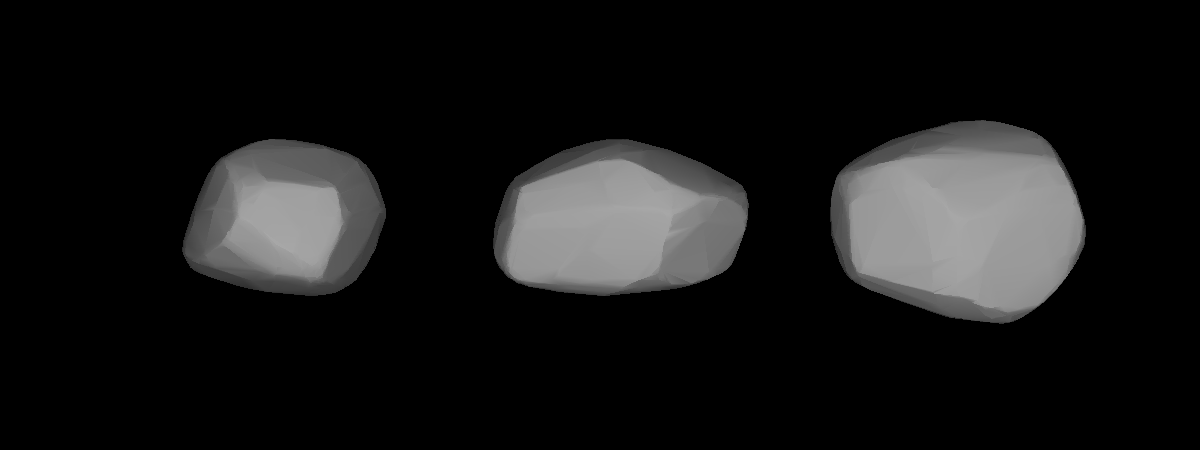
- Lightcurve-based 3D-model of Salonta

Discovery
- Discovered by: G. Kulin
- Discovery site: Konkoly Obs.
- Discovery date: 11 December 1936

Designations
- Named after: Salonta (Romanian city)
- Alternative designations: 1936 YA · 1933 FX_{1} 1934 NU · 1954 CQ
- Minor planet category: main-belt · (outer) background

Orbital characteristics
- Epoch 4 September 2017 (JD 2458000.5)
- Uncertainty parameter 0
- Observation arc: 84.20 yr (30,754 days)
- Aphelion: 3.3424 AU
- Perihelion: 2.9502 AU
- Semi-major axis: 3.1463 AU
- Eccentricity: 0.0623
- Orbital period (sidereal): 5.58 yr (2,038 days)
- Mean anomaly: 328.13°
- Mean motion: 0° 10^{m} 35.76^{s} / day
- Inclination: 13.889°
- Longitude of ascending node: 260.42°
- Argument of perihelion: 29.895°

Physical characteristics
- Dimensions: 52.73±17.17 km 53.769±0.269 km 60.95±0.91 km 62.90±1.6 km 62.927±0.418 km 65.53±15.83 km 72.06±0.75 km
- Synodic rotation period: 8.861±0.003 h 8.870±0.004 h (Note: Lightcurve plot of 1436 Salonta, Palmer Divide Observatory, Brian D. Warner (2007). Summary figures at LCDB); 8.8716±0.0007 h
- Geometric albedo: 0.028±0.005; 0.03±0.02; 0.0338±0.0052; 0.0339±0.002; 0.037±0.001; 0.05±0.04
- Spectral type: P · C (assumed)
- Absolute magnitude (H): 10.20 · 10.27±0.34 · 10.30 · 10.43

1436 Salonta, provisional designation 1936 YA, is a dark background asteroid from the outer regions of the asteroid belt, approximately 60 kilometers in diameter. Discovered by György Kulin at the Konkoly Observatory in 1936, the asteroid was later named for the Romanian city of Salonta, the birthplace of the discoverer.

== Discovery ==
Salonta was discovered on 11 December 1936, by Hungarian astronomer György Kulin at the Konkoly Observatory in Budapest. Three nights later, it was independently discovered by French astronomer André Patry at Nice Observatory on 14 December 1936. The Minor Planet Center only recognizes the first discoverer. The asteroid was first identified as 1933 FX_{1} at Johannesburg Observatory in March 1933.

== Orbit and classification ==
Salonta is a non-family asteroid from the main belt's background population. It orbits the Sun in the outer asteroid belt at a distance of 3.0–3.3 AU once every 5 years and 7 months (2,038 days). Its orbit has an eccentricity of 0.06 and an inclination of 14° with respect to the ecliptic. The body's observation arc begins at the discovering Konkloy Observatory in January 1937, about one month after its official discovery observation.

== Physical characteristics ==
Salonta has been characterized as a dark and primitive P-type asteroid by the Wide-field Infrared Survey Explorer (WISE). It is also an assumed carbonaceous C-type asteroid.

=== Rotation period ===
In 2007 and 2008, three rotational lightcurves of Salonta were independently obtained from photometric observations by astronomers Brian Warner, Pierre Antonini and René Roy. Lightcurve analysis gave a well defined rotation period between 8.861 and 8.8716 hours with a brightness amplitude of 0.17 to 0.33 magnitude (U=3/3/3).

=== Spin axis ===
In 2016, a lightcurve of Salonta has also been modeled using data from the Uppsala Asteroid Photometric Catalogue, the Palomar Transient Factory survey, and from individual observers. Modelling gave a concurring sidereal period of 8.86985 hours as well as two spin axis of (223.0°, 18.0°) and (57.0°, 35°) in ecliptic coordinates (λ, β).

=== Diameter and albedo ===
According to the surveys carried out by the Infrared Astronomical Satellite IRAS, the Japanese Akari satellite and the NEOWISE mission of NASA's WISE telescope, Salonta measures between 52.73 and 72.06 kilometers in diameter and its surface has an albedo between 0.028 and 0.05.

The Collaborative Asteroid Lightcurve Link adopts the results obtained by IRAS, that is, an albedo of 0.0339 and a diameter of 62.90 kilometers based on an absolute magnitude of 10.3.

== Naming ==
This minor planet was named after the Romanian city of Salonta, formerly known as "Nagyszalonta" when it was still part of the Kingdom of Hungary. It is the birthplace of the discoverer György Kulin. The official naming citation was published by the Minor Planet Center on 1 February 1980 (M.P.C. 5182).
