= Maria Lugaro =

Italian astrophysicist and researcher

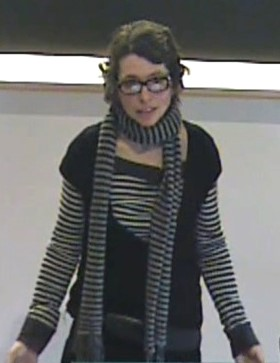
- Lugaro lectures at the University of Padua in 2015
- Education: University of Turin; Monash University
- Scientific career
- Workplaces: Monash University; Utrecht University; University of Notre Dame; University of Cambridge
- Thesis: Nucleosynthesis in AGB stars (2001)

Maria Lugaro is an Italian astrophysicist who is a researcher at the Konkoly Observatory of the Hungarian Academy of Sciences. Her research considers nuclear radioactivity in the solar system and asymptotic giant branch stars.

== Early life and education ==
Lugaro was born in Turin. At high school, she specialised in classics, including Greek and Latin. She was an undergraduate student in theoretical physics at the University of Turin. During her undergraduate studies, she worked on slow neutron captures. She was supported by the Australian Government to complete her doctorate at Monash University. Her research considered nucleosynthesis in asymptotic giant branch stars.

== Research and career ==
Lugaro worked as a postdoctoral researcher at the University of Notre Dame and University of Cambridge. She moved to Utrecht University as a Dutch Research Council VENI Fellow. In 2008, she returned to Australia, where she was made an Australian Research Council Future Fellow and Senior Lecturer at Monash University. She used radioactive dating to understand the age of meteorites. She moved to Konkoly Observatory at the Hungarian Academy of Sciences in 2014.

In 2017, Lugaro was awarded a European Research Council Consolidator Grants for RADIOSTAR, a program that looks to understand the radioactive nuclei produced in stellar nuclear reactions. Lugaro believes that it will be possible to uncover the history of the Solar System by examining the origin of these radioactive nuclei. She has studied neutron stars, and showed that their collisions can result in supernova that collapse whilst spinning, generating strong magnetic fields and super heavy elements.

== Selected publications ==
- Claudio Arlandini; Franz Kappeler; Klaus Wisshak; Roberto Gallino; Lugaro, Maria; Busso, Maurizio; Oscar Straniero (1999). "Neutron Capture in Low‐Mass Asymptotic Giant Branch Stars: Cross Sections and Abundance Signatures". The Astrophysical Journal. 525 (2): 886–900. arXiv:astro-ph/9906266. Bibcode:1999ApJ...525..886A. doi:10.1086/307938. Wikidata Q56049606.
- Lugaro, Maria; Ugalde C.; Karakas, Amanda Irene; Gorres J.; Wiescher M.; Lattanzio, John; Cannon R. C. (2004). "Reaction rate uncertainties and the production of ^19^F in asymptotic giant branch stars". The Astrophysical Journal Letters. 615: 934–946. arXiv:astro-ph/0407551. Bibcode:2004ApJ...615..934L. doi:10.1086/424559. Wikidata Q68388394.
- Karakas, Amanda Irene; Lugaro, Maria (2016). "Stellar yields from metal-rich asymptotic giant branch models". The Astrophysical Journal. 825 (1): 26–26. arXiv:1604.02178. Bibcode:2016ApJ...825...26K. doi:10.3847/0004-637x/825/1/26. Wikidata Q59836840.

== Personal life ==
Lugaro has four sons, including a set of twins.
