= 1710 Gothard =

Stony asteroid

Discovery
- Discovered by: G. Kulin
- Discovery site: Konkoly Obs.
- Discovery date: 20 October 1941

Designations
- Named after: Jenő Gothard (amateur astronomer)
- Alternative designations: 1941 UF · 1955 TT
- Minor planet category: main-belt · (inner)

Orbital characteristics
- Epoch 4 September 2017 (JD 2458000.5)
- Uncertainty parameter 0
- Observation arc: 61.45 yr (22,446 days)
- Aphelion: 2.9449 AU
- Perihelion: 1.6975 AU
- Semi-major axis: 2.3212 AU
- Eccentricity: 0.2687
- Orbital period (sidereal): 3.54 yr (1,292 days)
- Mean anomaly: 204.83°
- Mean motion: 0° 16^{m} 43.32^{s} / day
- Inclination: 8.4727°
- Longitude of ascending node: 356.61°
- Argument of perihelion: 335.99°

Physical characteristics
- Dimensions: 5.66 km (calculated); 9.838±0.179 km
- Synodic rotation period: 4.939±0.003 h 4.94 h
- Geometric albedo: 0.087±0.013; 0.20 (assumed)
- Spectral type: S
- Absolute magnitude (H): 13.3 · 13.6

1710 Gothard, provisional designation 1941 UF, is a stony asteroid from the inner regions of the asteroid belt, approximately 9 kilometers in diameter. It was discovered on 20 October 1941, by Hungarian astronomer György Kulin at the Konkoly Observatory in Budapest, Hungary. It was later named after Hungarian amateur astronomer Jenő Gothard.

== Orbit and classification ==
The S-type asteroid orbits the Sun at a distance of 1.7–2.9 AU once every 3 years and 6 months (1,292 days). Its orbit has an eccentricity of 0.27 and an inclination of 8° with respect to the ecliptic. Gothard's observation arc begins 14 years after its official discovery observation, when it was identified as 1955 TT at Uccle Observatory in 1955.

== Physical characteristics ==
=== Rotation period ===
In October 2001 and October 2008, two rotational light-curves of Gothard were obtained by French amateur astronomers Laurent Bernasconi and René Roy, giving a concurring rotation period of 4.94 hours with a brightness variation of 0.31 and 0.32 in magnitude, respectively (U=3/3-).

=== Diameter and albedo ===
According to the survey carried out by NASA's Wide-field Infrared Survey Explorer with its subsequent NEOWISE mission, Gothard measures 9.84 kilometers in diameter, and its surface has an albedo of 0.087, while the Collaborative Asteroid Lightcurve Link assumes a standard albedo for stony asteroids of 0.20 and calculates a diameter of 5.66 kilometers with an absolute magnitude of 13.6.

== Naming ==
This minor planet was named in memory of Hungarian amateur astronomer Jenő Gothard (1857–1909), who discovered the central star in the Ring Nebula (M57). The official naming citation was published by the Minor Planet Center on 1 February 1980 (M.P.C. 5183).
