= 10258 Sárneczky =

Main-belt asteroid

Discovery
- Discovered by: G. Kulin
- Discovery site: Konkoly Obs.
- Discovery date: 6 January 1940

Designations
- Named after: Krisztián Sárneczky (Hungarian astronomer)
- Alternative designations: 1940 AB · 1988 RZ_{4} 1989 WK_{7} · 1989 WL_{6} 1998 KD_{53}
- Minor planet category: main-belt · (outer) background

Orbital characteristics
- Epoch 4 September 2017 (JD 2458000.5)
- Uncertainty parameter 0
- Observation arc: 77.74 yr (28,393 days)
- Aphelion: 3.4567 AU
- Perihelion: 2.8649 AU
- Semi-major axis: 3.1608 AU
- Eccentricity: 0.0936
- Orbital period (sidereal): 5.62 yr (2,053 days)
- Mean anomaly: 339.90°
- Mean motion: 0° 10^{m} 31.44^{s} / day
- Inclination: 14.192°
- Longitude of ascending node: 128.78°
- Argument of perihelion: 291.32°

Physical characteristics
- Dimensions: 14.275±0.264 km
- Geometric albedo: 0.151±0.026
- Absolute magnitude (H): 12.1

10258 Sárneczky, provisional designation 1940 AB, is a background asteroid from the outer regions of the asteroid belt, approximately 14 kilometers in diameter. It was discovered on 6 January 1940, by Hungarian astronomer György Kulin at the Konkoly Observatory, near Budapest. The asteroid was named after Hungarian astronomer Krisztián Sárneczky.

== Orbit and classification ==
Sárneczky is non-family asteroid from the main-belt's background population. It orbits the Sun in the outer asteroid belt at a distance of 2.9–3.5 AU once every 5 years and 7 months (2,053 days). Its orbit has an eccentricity of 0.09 and an inclination of 14° with respect to the ecliptic. The body's observation arc begins with its official discovery observation at Konkoly in 1940.

== Physical characteristics ==
=== Diameter and albedo ===
According to the survey carried out by the NEOWISE mission of NASA's Wide-field Infrared Survey Explorer, Sárneczky measures 14.275 kilometers in diameter and its surface has an albedo of 0.151. The asteroid has an absolute magnitude of 12.1.

=== Rotation period ===
As of 2017, no rotational lightcurve of Sárneczky has been obtained from photometric observations. The body's rotation period, shape and poles remain unknown.

== Naming ==
This minor planet was named after Krisztián Sárneczky (born 1974), a Hungarian amateur astronomer and discoverer of minor planets and supernovae. He is a board member of the Hungarian Astronomical Association (HAA). The official naming citation was published by the Minor Planet Center on 5 October 2017 (M.P.C. 106499).
