= 2058 Róka =

Themistian asteroid

Discovery
- Discovered by: G. Kulin
- Discovery site: Konkoly Obs.
- Discovery date: 22 January 1938

Designations
- Named after: Gedeon Róka (1906–1974) (Hungarian science writer)
- Alternative designations: 1938 BH · 1951 NP; 1962 NA · 1963 UM; 1974 SZ_{1} · 1978 AE; 1985 UL_{3}
- Minor planet category: main-belt · Themis

Orbital characteristics
- Epoch 4 September 2017 (JD 2458000.5)
- Uncertainty parameter 0
- Observation arc: 79.18 yr (28,920 days)
- Aphelion: 3.5790 AU
- Perihelion: 2.6682 AU
- Semi-major axis: 3.1236 AU
- Eccentricity: 0.1458
- Orbital period (sidereal): 5.52 yr (2,016 days)
- Mean anomaly: 17.333°
- Mean motion: 0° 10^{m} 42.6^{s} / day
- Inclination: 2.5352°
- Longitude of ascending node: 95.329°
- Argument of perihelion: 180.50°

Physical characteristics
- Dimensions: 21.12 km (derived); 21.36±3.1 km 23.40±0.52 km 24.122±0.246 km 24.273±0.234 km
- Synodic rotation period: 10.04±0.02 h 10.09±0.01 h
- Geometric albedo: 0.0995 (derived); 0.1196±0.0252; 0.121±0.017; 0.130±0.006; 0.1542±0.056
- Spectral type: C · S
- Absolute magnitude (H): 11.0 · 11.5 · 11.56±0.34

2058 Róka, provisional designation 1938 BH, is a Themistian asteroid from the outer regions of the asteroid belt, approximately 22 kilometers in diameter.

It was discovered on 22 January 1938, by Hungarian György Kulin at Konkoly Observatory in Budapest, Hungary. The asteroid was named in memory of Hungarian science writer Gedeon Róka.

== Classification and orbit ==
Róka is a member of the Themis family, a dynamical family of carbonaceous outer-belt asteroids with nearly coplanar ecliptical orbits. It orbits the Sun at a distance of 2.7–3.6 AU once every 5 years and 6 months (2,016 days). Its orbit has an eccentricity of 0.15 and an inclination of 3° with respect to the ecliptic. The body's observation arc begins with its official discovery observation at Konkoly in 1938.

== Physical characteristics ==
Róka has been characterized as a carbonaceous C-type asteroid by Pan-STARRS photometric survey. Due to its ambivalent albedo it is also an assumed S-type asteroid.

=== Lightcurves ===
In March 2005, a rotational lightcurve of Róka was obtained from photometric observations by French amateur astronomer René Roy. Lightcurve analysis gave a rotation period of 10.04 hours with a brightness variation of 0.34 magnitude (U=3-). One month later, astronomer at the Rose-Hulman Observatory obtained another lightcurve with a concurring period of 10.09 hours and an amplitude of 0.40 magnitude (U=2).

=== Diameter and albedo ===
According to the surveys carried out by the Infrared Astronomical Satellite IRAS, the Japanese Akari satellite, and the NEOWISE mission of NASA's Wide-field Infrared Survey Explorer, Róka measures between 21.36 and 24.273 kilometers in diameter and its surface has an albedo between 0.1196 and 0.1542. The Collaborative Asteroid Lightcurve Link derives an albedo of 0.0995 and calculates a diameter of 21.12 kilometers based on an absolute magnitude of 11.5.

== Naming ==
This minor planet was named in memory of Gedeon Róka (1906–1974), a Hungarian science writer and popularizer of astronomy from Budapest. The approved naming citation was published by the Minor Planet Center on 1 February 1980 (M.P.C. 5183).
