= 1513 Mátra =

Main-belt asteroid

Discovery
- Discovered by: G. Kulin
- Discovery site: Konkoly Obs.
- Discovery date: 10 March 1940

Designations
- Named after: Mátra (mountain range)
- Alternative designations: 1940 EB · 1940 EO
- Minor planet category: main-belt · Flora

Orbital characteristics
- Epoch 4 September 2017 (JD 2458000.5)
- Uncertainty parameter 0
- Observation arc: 66.67 yr (24,351 days)
- Aphelion: 2.4085 AU
- Perihelion: 1.9763 AU
- Semi-major axis: 2.1924 AU
- Eccentricity: 0.0986
- Orbital period (sidereal): 3.25 yr (1,186 days)
- Mean anomaly: 324.55°
- Mean motion: 0° 18^{m} 12.96^{s} / day
- Inclination: 3.9773°
- Longitude of ascending node: 136.22°
- Argument of perihelion: 27.140°

Physical characteristics
- Dimensions: 4.96±0.70 km 5.19±0.92 km 5.85 km (calculated); 6.603±0.271 km
- Synodic rotation period: 24 h
- Geometric albedo: 0.189±0.024; 0.24 (assumed); 0.31±0.19; 0.34±0.13
- Spectral type: S
- Absolute magnitude (H): 13.33 · 13.43

1513 Mátra (provisional designation 1940 EB) is a stony Florian asteroid from the inner regions of the asteroid belt, approximately 5 kilometers in diameter. It was discovered on 10 March 1940, by Hungarian astronomer György Kulin at Konkoly Observatory in Budapest, Hungary. It was later named after the Mátra mountain range.

== Orbit and classification ==
Mátra is a member of the Flora family, a large group of stony S-type asteroids in the inner main-belt. It orbits the Sun at a distance of 2.0–2.4 AU once every 3 years and 3 months (1,186 days). Its orbit has an eccentricity of 0.10 and an inclination of 4° with respect to the ecliptic.

One day prior to Mátra's official discovery observation at Konkoly, a precovery was taken at Nice Observatory. However, the body's observation arc begins 10 years later in 1950, when it was observed at the La Plata Observatory in Argentina.

== Physical characteristics ==
=== Rotation period ===
American astronomer Richard P. Binzel obtained a rotational light-curve of Mátra from photometric observation in the 1980s. It gave a tentative rotation period of 24 hours with a brightness variation of 0.1 magnitude (U=1). As of 2017, a secure period still has yet to be determined.

=== Diameter and albedo ===
According to the survey carried out by NASA's Wide-field Infrared Survey Explorer with its subsequent NEOWISE mission, Mátra measures between 4.96 and 6.60 kilometers in diameter and its surface has an albedo between 0.189 and 0.34.

The Collaborative Asteroid Lightcurve Link assumes an albedo of 0.24 – derived from the family's largest body and namesake, the asteroid 8 Flora – and calculates a diameter of 5.85 kilometers with an absolute magnitude of 13.33.

== Naming ==
This minor planet was named after the Mátra mountain range in northern Hungary, where the outstation of the discovering Konkoly Observatory is located. The official naming citation was published by the Minor Planet Center on 1 February 1980 (M.P.C. 5182).
