= Fritz M. de Molnár =

Scouting pioneer in Hungary

Hungarian International Scout Commissioner

Fritz M. de Molnár was a Scouting pioneer in Hungary. He became the Hungarian International Scout Commissioner.

Important Scouting pioneers in Hungary were Sándor Sík, László Králik, de Molnar and Aladar de Szillassy. de Molnar brought a copy of Scouting for Boys from Sweden to Hungary and started Scouting in the Piarist College. de Molnar later became the Hungarian International Commissioner and Deputy Camp Chief. He was the man who won the heart of Count Pál Teleki for Scouting.

While the Hungarian Sea Scouts were attending a Sea Scout rally in the summer of 1927 at Helsingør, Denmark, Géza Teleki was inclined on a cruise to ignore a reprimand from his Scoutmaster, Fritz M. de Molnár, for failure to carry out a small but necessary exercise of seamanship. Molnár tried to drive home his point by threatening to tell the boy's father on their return to Budapest, but Géza replied, "Oh, Dad's not interested in Scouting." This prompted Molnár to take up the subject of Scouting with Count Pál Teleki, who became interested. It meant that the movement in Hungary obtained the wholehearted support and encouragement of one of its noted citizens, becoming Chief Scout, honorary Chief Scout, a member of the International Committee for many years, camp chief of the 4th World Scout Jamboree, and a close friend of his contemporary Baden-Powell.
