= List of Hungarian astronomers =

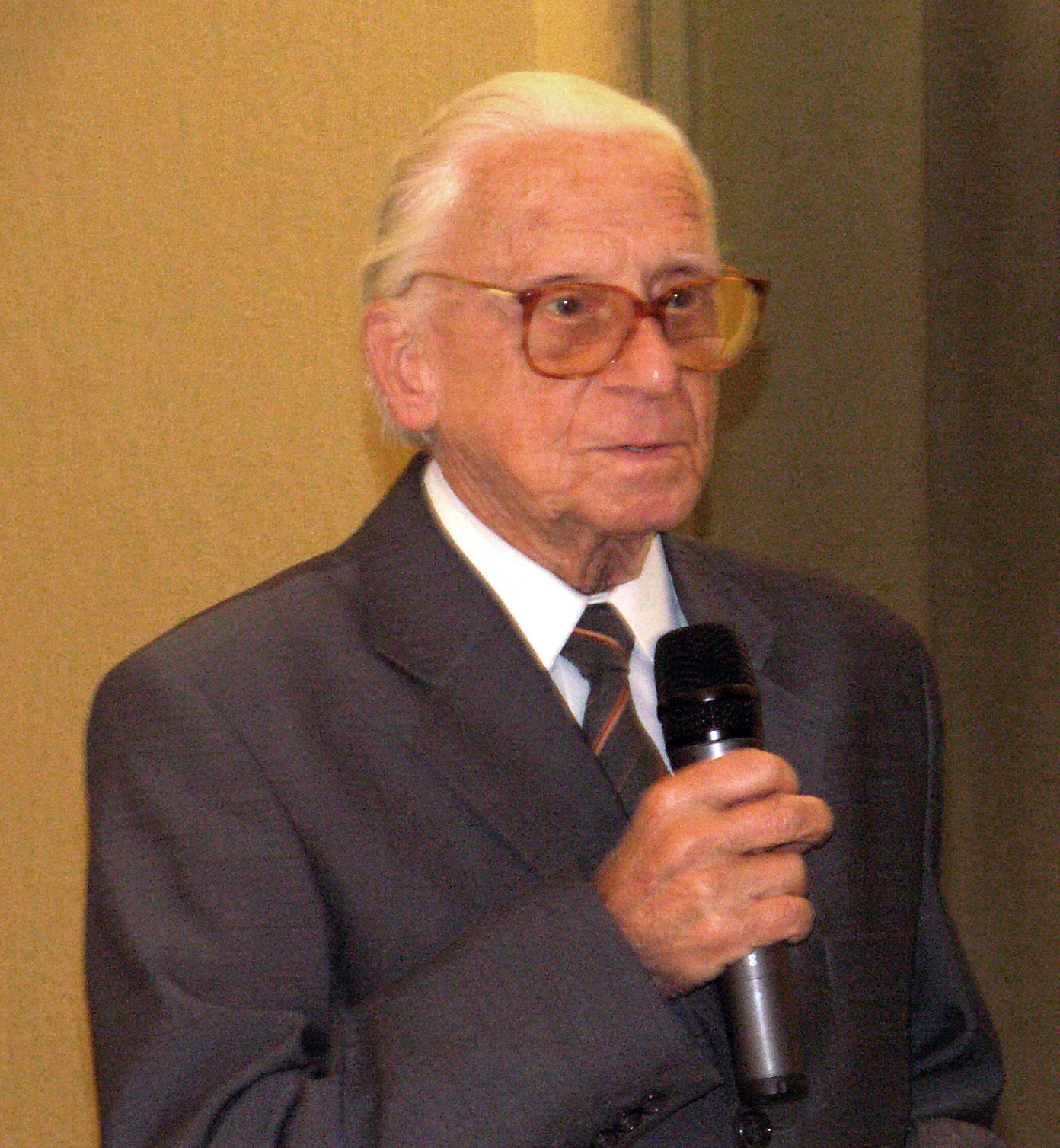
Ponori Thewrewk Aurél

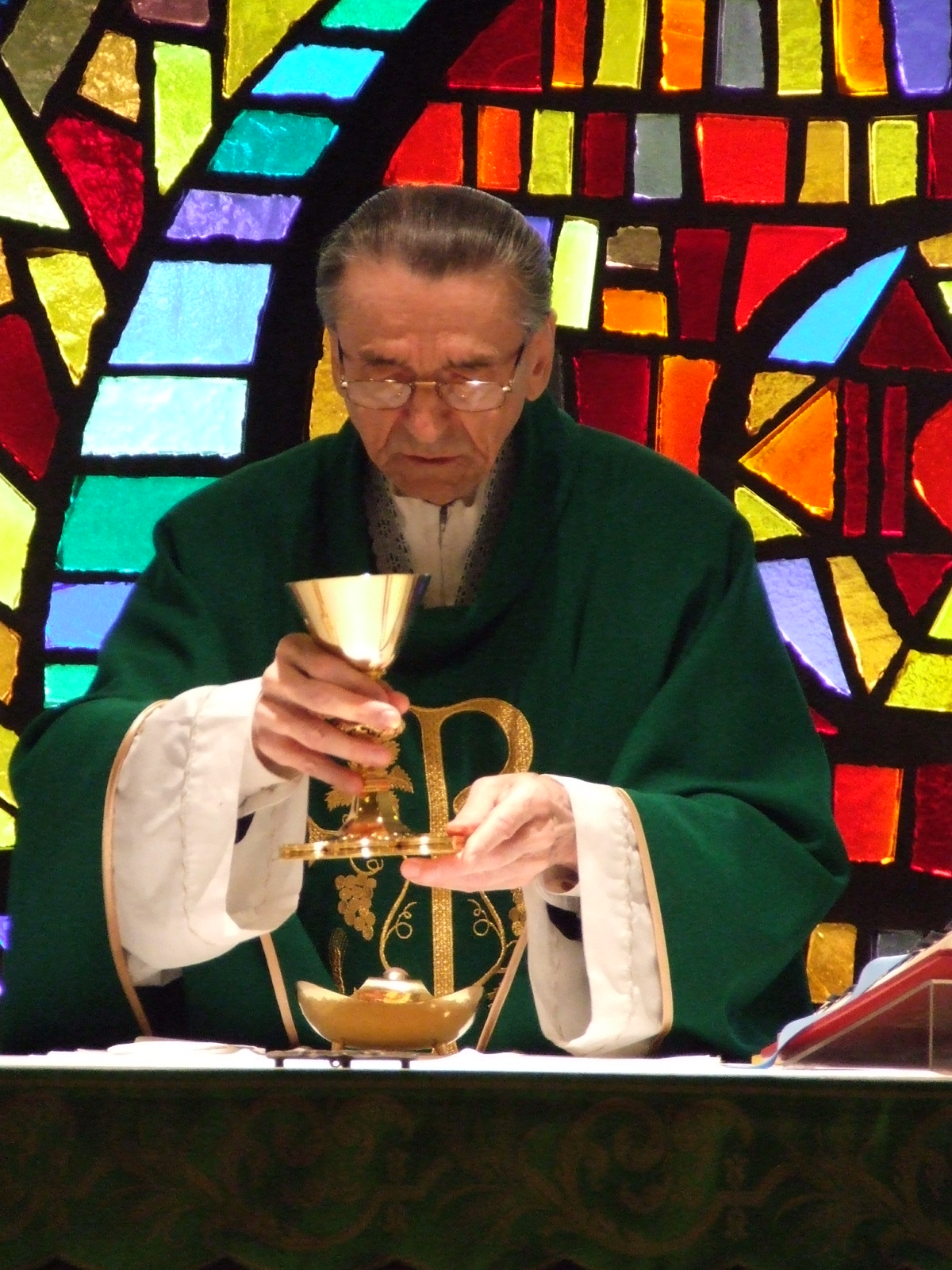
Teres Ágoston

== A ==
- Alauda József
- Albert Ferenc
- Almár Iván
- Andrássy István

== B ==
- Balajthi Máté
- Balázs Lajos
- Berkó Ernő
- Bogdán Ákos Max Planck Asztrofizikai Intézet
- Borkovits Tamás
- Both Előd
- Bruna Xaver Ferenc

== D ==
- Detre László
- Dezső Lóránt

== F ==
- Fejes István
- Fényi Gyula
- Frey Sándor
- David Friesenhausen

== G ==
- Gothard Jenő
- Guman István

== H ==
- Harkányi Béla
- Hédervári Péter
- Hegedüs Tibor
- Hell Miksa
- Hollósy Jusztinián
- Horváth András
- Horváth István

== I ==
- Ill Márton
- Iván Almár, inducted into the IAF Hall of Fame in 2024.
- Izsák Imre

== J ==
- Lajos Jánossy

== K ==
- Kiss László
- Kolláth Zoltán
- Kondor Gusztáv
- Konkoly-Thege Miklós
- Kövesligethy Radó
- Kulin György

== L ==
- Löw Móritz

== M ==
- Mahler Ede
- Marik Miklós

== N ==
- Nagy Károly
- Nagy Sándor

== P ==
- Paál György
- Ponori Thewrewk Aurél

== R ==
- Rezsabek Nándor

== S ==
- Sajnovics János
- Szabados László
- Szatmáry Károly
- Szentmártoni Béla
- Sárneczky Krisztián
- Szebehely Győző

== T ==
- Teres Ágoston
- Terkán Lajos
- Tittel Pál

== V ==
- Virághalmy Géza

== W ==
- Weinek László

== Z ==
- Zách János Ferenc
- Zerinváry Szilárd
