= György Kulin =

Hungarian astronomer

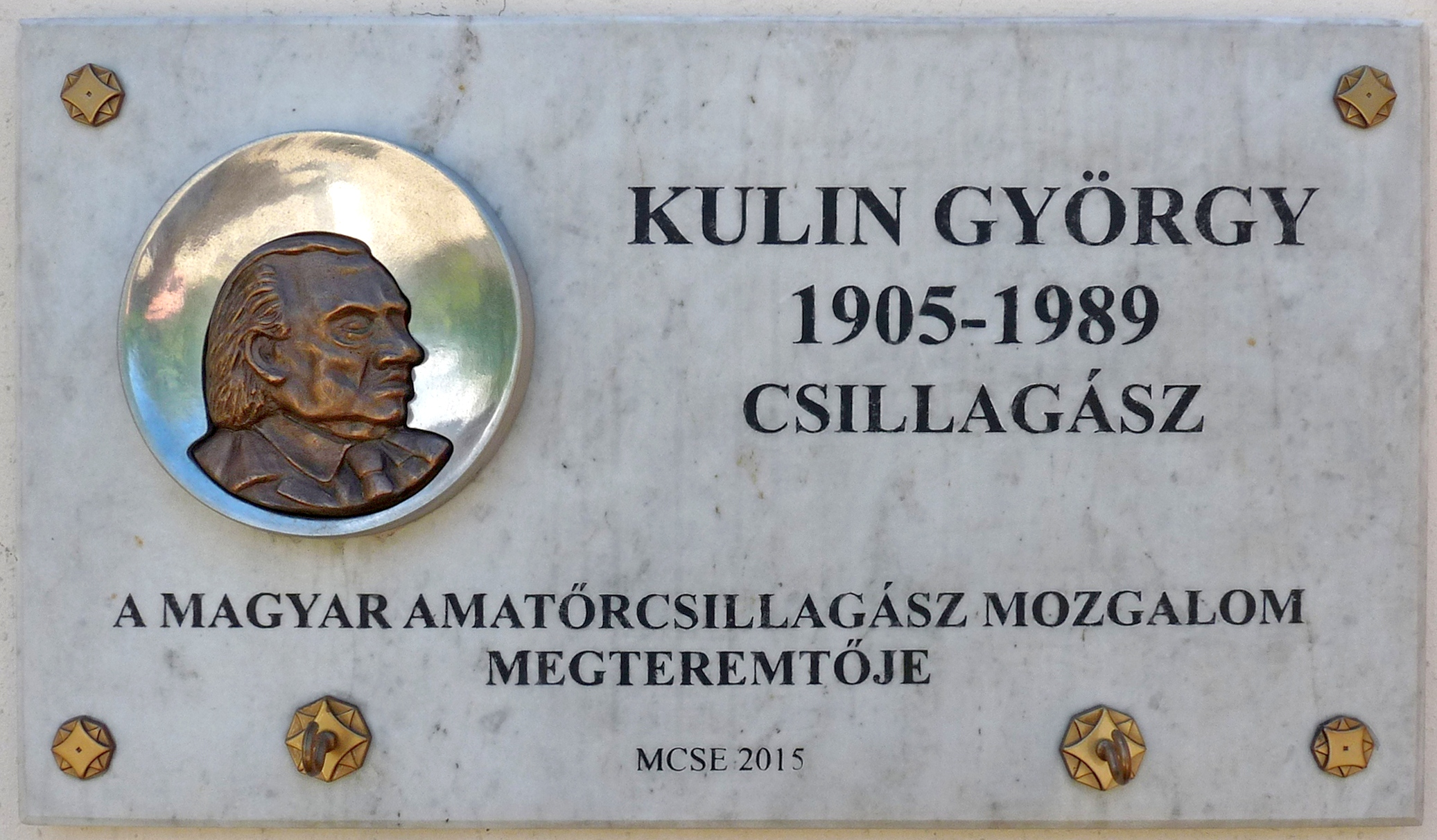
Memorial plaque in Budapest

Asteroids discovered: 21
1436 Salonta	December 11, 1936
1441 Bolyai	November 26, 1937
1442 Corvina	December 29, 1937
1444 Pannonia	January 6, 1938
1445 Konkolya	January 6, 1938
1452 Hunnia	February 26, 1938
1489 Attila	April 12, 1939
1513 Mátra	March 10, 1940
1538 Detre	September 8, 1940
1546 Izsák	September 28, 1941
1710 Gothard	October 20, 1941
2043 Ortutay	November 12, 1936
2058 Róka	January 22, 1938
2242 Balaton	October 13, 1936
2712 Keaton	December 29, 1937
2738 Viracocha	March 12, 1940
3019 Kulin	January 7, 1940
3380 Awaji	March 15, 1940
3427 Szentmártoni	January 6, 1938
7317 Cabot	March 12, 1940
10258 Sárneczky	January 6, 1940

György Kulin (28 January 1905 – 22 April 1989) was a Hungarian astronomer and discoverer of minor planets. He was born in Nagyszalonta and died in Budapest.

He discovered 21 asteroids and is a co-discoverer of the comet C/1942 C1 (Whipple–Bernasconi–Kulin). In addition to astronomy he also wrote some science fiction. The asteroid 3019 Kulin was named in his honor.
