= Géza Teleki =

Hungarian politician

Minister of Religion and Education of Hungary
- In office 22 December 1944 (officially 27 March 1945) – 13 November 1945
- Preceded by: Ferenc Szálasi
- Succeeded by: Dezső Keresztury

Personal details
- Born: 27 November 1911 Budapest, Austria-Hungary
- Died: 5 January 1983 (aged 71) Lost City, West Virginia, US
- Party: Civil Democratic Party
- Spouse(s): Jolán Darányi; Johanna Mikes
- Children: 4
- Profession: politician, university professor, field hockey player, geologist

Count Géza Teleki de Szék (also known as Géza von Teleki, 27 November 1911 – 5 January 1983) was a Hungarian politician and field hockey player who competed in the 1936 Summer Olympics. He was born in Budapest, the son of Pál Teleki.

== Private life ==
While the Hungarian Sea Scouts were attending a Sea Scout rally in the summer of 1927 at Helsingør, Denmark, Teleki was inclined on a cruise to ignore a reprimand from his scoutmaster, Fritz M. de Molnár, for failure to carry out a small but necessary exercise of seamanship. Molnár tried to drive home his point by threatening to tell the boy's father on their return to Budapest, but Géza replied, "Oh, Dad's not interested in scouting." This prompted Molnár to take up the subject of Scouting with Count Teleki, who became interested. It meant that the movement in Hungary obtained the wholehearted support and encouragement of one of its noted citizens, becoming Chief Scout, honorary Chief Scout, a member of the International Committee for many years, camp chief of the 4th World Scout Jamboree, and a close friend of his contemporary Baden-Powell.

In 1936 Géza Teleki was a member of the Hungarian field hockey team at the 1936 summer Olympics, playing in all three matches as a forward.

== Political career ==
Géza Teleki pressed for the truce on the end of the Second World War and became a member of the delegation that started peace negotiations in Moscow on 28 September 1944. He also signed the interim truce on 11 October, although this was thwarted by the Nazi-style Arrow Cross Party takeover on 15 October. He served as minister of religion and education in the Interim National Government that formed in Debrecen and was briefly leader of the new conservative Civic Democratic Party, but then taught in the Faculty of Economics of the University of Budapest until 1948. He emigrated to the United States in 1949.

== Later life ==
He was a teacher at the University of Virginia from 1950. From 1955 he was a geology professor at the George Washington University. Teleki and his wife took their own lives due to an incurable disease. His father, Pál Teleki also committed suicide in 1941.

== See also ==
Political offices
Preceded by Ferenc Szálasi	Minister of Religion and Education; 1944–1945	Succeeded by Dezső Keresztury
