= Astronomer =

Scientist in the field of astronomy

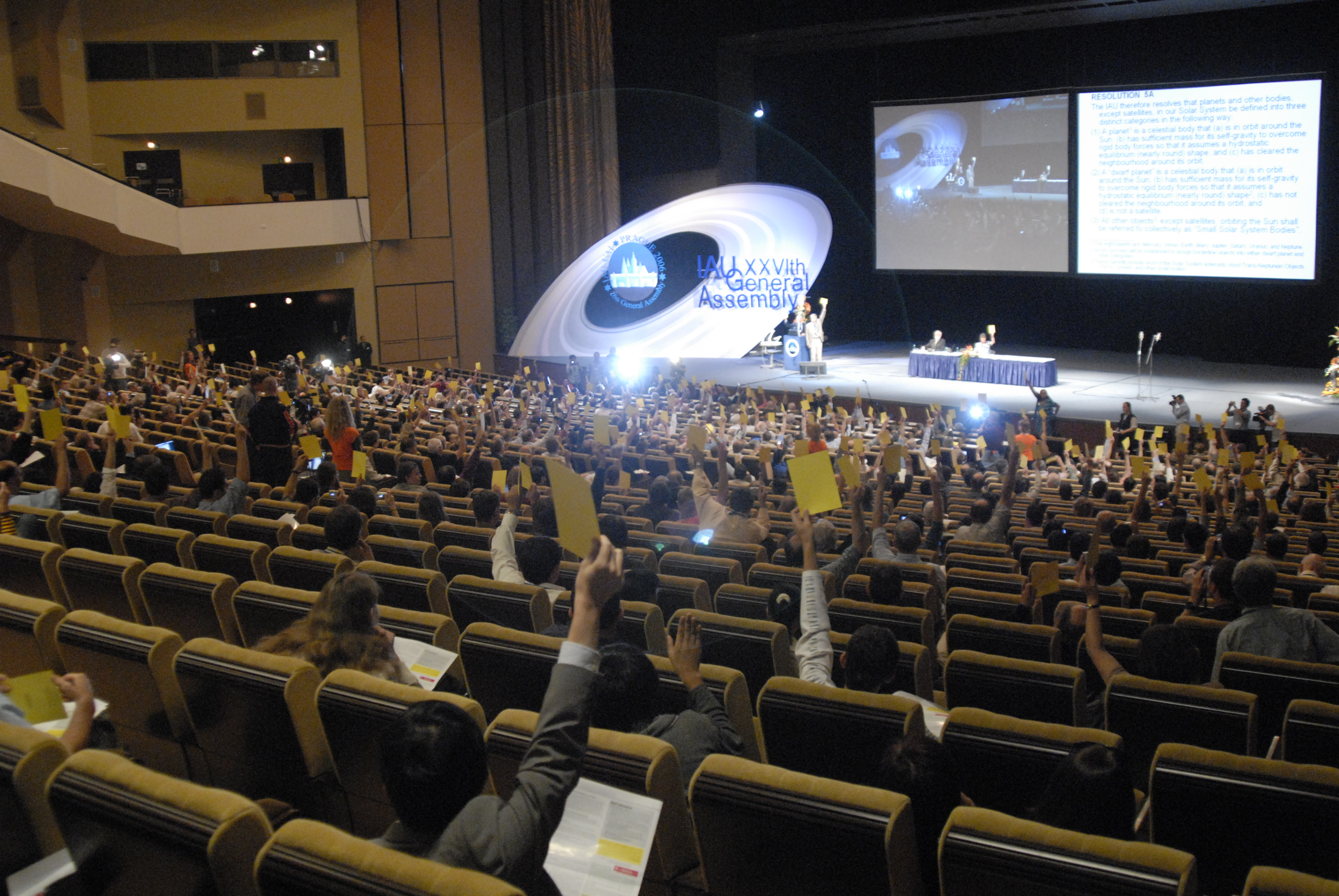
A voting session is conducted in 2006 International Astronomical Union's general assembly for determining a new definition of a planet

An astronomer is a scientist in the field of astronomy who focuses on a specific question or field outside the scope of Earth. Astronomers study astronomical objects, such as stars, planets, moons, comets and galaxies, by some combination of observation and the application of astrophysical models. Examples of topics or fields astronomers study include planetary science, solar astronomy, the origin or evolution of stars, or the formation of galaxies. A related but distinct subject is physical cosmology, which studies the universe as a whole.

== Character of work ==
Astronomers cannot typically perform experiments: the objects of interest in the field are far away. Consequently they rely primarily on observations, collecting electromagnetic radiation, gravitational waves, or particles such as cosmic rays. Some experiments on planets in the solar system are now possible via remote controlled spacecraft. Some of the measurements astronomers perform include astrometry (positions of celestial bodies), photometry (light flux), spectroscopy (intensity vs wavelength), and imaging.

== Subfields ==
Astronomy includes astrometry, planetary astronomy, astrophysics, astrochemistry, astrobiology, stellar astronomy, galactic astronomy, extragalactic astronomy, and physical cosmology. Astronomers can also specialize in certain specialties of observational astronomy, such as infrared astronomy, neutrino astronomy, x-ray astronomy, and gravitational-wave astronomy.

== Academic ==
=== History ===
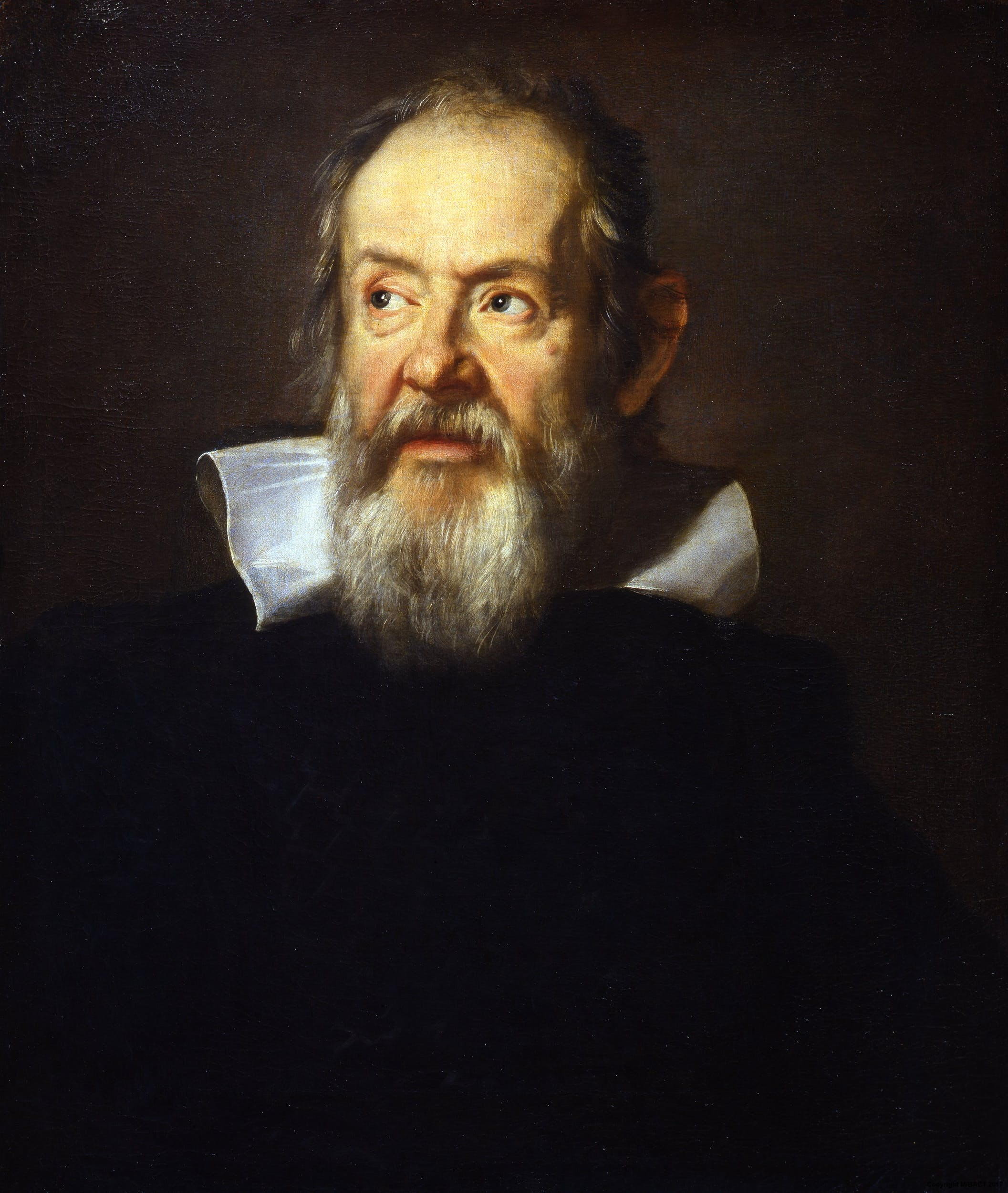
Galileo Galilei is often referred to as the father of modern astronomy. Portrait by Justus Sustermans.

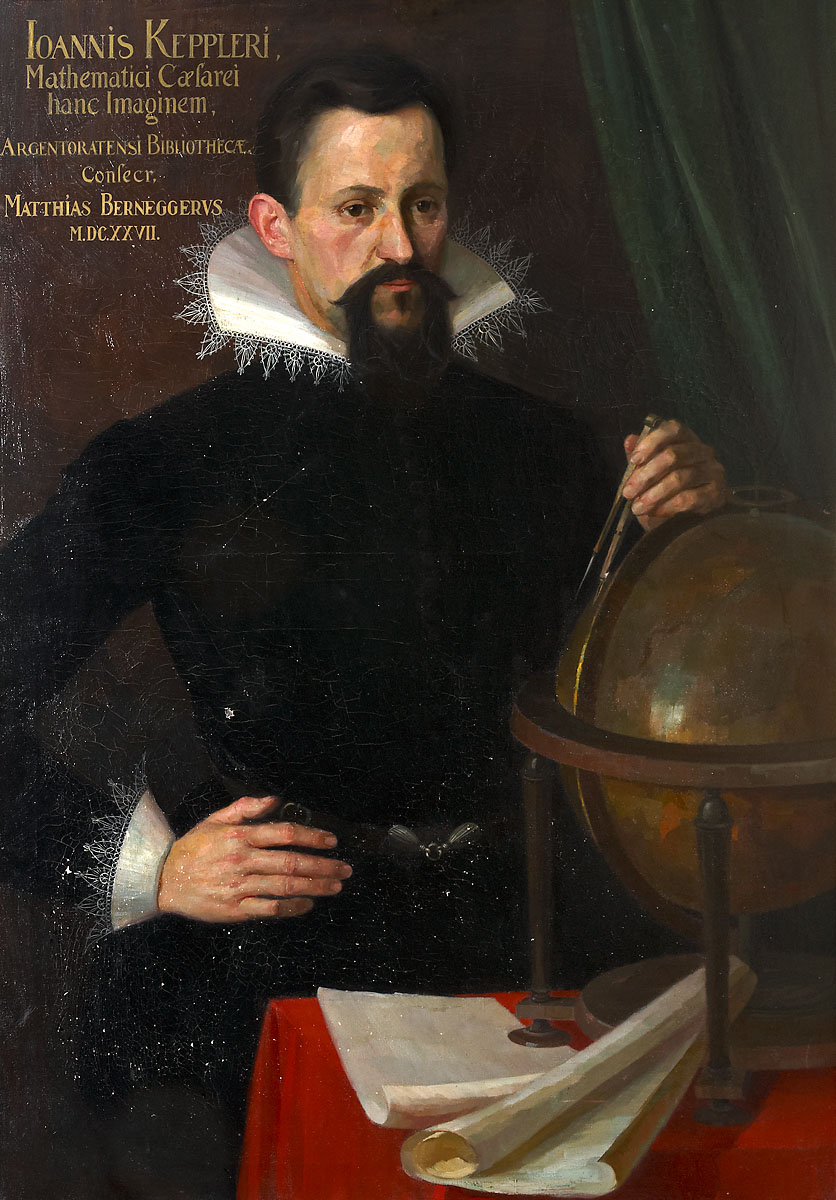
Johannes Kepler, one of the fathers of modern astronomy

Historically, astronomy was more concerned with the classification and description of phenomena in the sky, while astrophysics attempted to explain these phenomena and the differences between them using physical laws. Today, that distinction has mostly disappeared and the terms "astronomer" and "astrophysicist" are interchangeable. Professional astronomers are highly educated individuals who typically have a PhD in physics or astronomy and are employed by research institutions or universities. They spend the majority of their time working on research, although they quite often have other duties such as teaching, building instruments, or aiding in the operation of an observatory.

The American Astronomical Society, which is the major organization of professional astronomers in North America, has approximately 8,200 members (as of 2024). This number includes scientists from other fields such as physics, geology, and engineering, whose research interests are closely related to astronomy. The International Astronomical Union comprises about 12,700 members from 92 countries who are involved in astronomical research at the PhD level and beyond (as of 2024).

Contrary to the classical image of an old astronomer peering through a telescope through the dark hours of the night, it is far more common to use a charge-coupled device (CCD) camera to record a long, deep exposure, allowing a more sensitive image to be created because the light is added over time. Before CCDs, photographic plates were a common method of observation. Modern astronomers spend relatively little time at telescopes, usually just a few weeks per year. Analysis of observed phenomena, along with making predictions as to the causes of what they observe, takes the majority of observational astronomers' time.

=== Activities and graduate degree training ===
Astronomers who serve as faculty spend much of their time teaching undergraduate and graduate classes. Most universities also have outreach programs, including public telescope time and sometimes planetarium, as a public service to encourage interest in the field.

Those who become astronomers usually have a broad background in physics, mathematics, sciences, and computing in high school. Taking courses that teach how to research, write, and present papers are part of the higher education of an astronomer, while most astronomers attain both a Master's degree and eventually a PhD degree in astronomy, physics or astrophysics.

PhD training typically involves 5–6 years of study, including completion of upper-level courses in the core sciences, a competency examination, experience with teaching undergraduates and participating in outreach programs, work on research projects under the student's supervising professor, completion of a PhD thesis, and passing a final oral exam. Throughout the PhD training, a successful student is financially supported with a stipend.

== Amateur astronomers ==
While there is a relatively low number of professional astronomers, the field is popular among amateurs. Most cities have amateur astronomy clubs that meet on a regular basis and often host star parties. The Astronomical Society of the Pacific is the largest general astronomical society in the world, comprising both professional and amateur astronomers as well as educators from 70 different nations.

As with any hobby, most people who practice amateur astronomy may devote a few hours a month to stargazing and reading the latest developments in research. However, amateurs span the range from so-called "armchair astronomers" to people who own science-grade telescopes and instruments with which they are able to make their own discoveries, create astrophotographs, and assist professional astronomers in research.

== See also ==
- List of astronomers
- List of women astronomers
- List of Muslim astronomers
- List of French astronomers
- List of Hungarian astronomers
- List of Russian astronomers and astrophysicists
- List of Slovenian astronomers
