= Lajos Jánossy =

Hungarian physicist, astrophysicist and mathematician

- Born: 2 March 1912; Budapest
- Died: 2 March 1978 (aged 66); Budapest
- Occupation: Physicist, university teacher
- Political party: Hungarian Socialist Workers' Party
- Parent(s): György Lukács
- Relatives: Ferenc Jánossy
- Position held: member of Central Committee of the Hungarian Socialist Workers' Party (1962–1978)

Lajos Jánossy (2 March 1912 – 2 March 1978) was a Hungarian physicist, astrophysicist and mathematician and a member of the Hungarian Academy of Sciences. His primary research fields were astrophysics, nuclear physics, quantum mechanics, mathematical physics, and statistics, as well as electrodynamics and optics.

== Biography ==
Jánossy was the adopted son of influential Marxist philosopher and politician György Lukács (1885–1971). He was also the brother of the economist and engineer Ferenc Jánossy (1914–1997). He married the physicist Leonie Kahn (1913-1966) who he met during his studies in Berlin: together they were parents to physicists Mihály Jánossy (1942–2004), András Jánossy (1944), also a member of the Hungarian Academy of Sciences, and István Jánossy (1945), as well as Anna Jánossy (1938-1999), a medical researcher.

After the 1919 fall of the early Hungarian Soviet Republic, his mother and stepfather, Gertrúd Borstieber and György Lukács, left the country together, and moved to Vienna. Thus, from the age of 6, Jánossy lived abroad: he attended university in Vienna and, later, in Berlin. He worked in the laboratory of Werner Kolhörster in Berlin (1934–1936) focusing on astrophysics until he and his wife had to move again, fleeing Nazism. He started working with P.M.S. Blackett — who became a Nobel laureate in 1948 — concentrating on cosmic radiation at Birkbeck College in London, heading the cosmic radiation research group and later at Manchester University. In 1947 invited by Walter Heitler and Erwin Schrödinger he joined the Dublin Institute for Advanced Studies as a professor and group leader of the cosmic rays research laboratory.

In 1950, invited by the Hungarian Government, Jánossy returned home to Budapest — not only for reasons of promised scientific possibilities, but also because his foster father and his mother had also returned there from their emigration in Moscow.

Jánossy was charged with the task of managing the Cosmic Radiation Department at the Central Research Institute for Physics (Hungarian abbreviation: KFKI) founded in 1950. He was very active in scientific organisation, education and public life. He was appointed deputy director of the KFKI from 1950 to 1956, and director from 1956 to 1970. In addition, he was also active as a university professor; the Department of Nuclear Physics at the Eötvös Loránd University was established for him. He was the first head of the Department of Nuclear Physics from 1957 to 1970.

His political engagement is attested by his membership, from 1962 until his death, in the Hungarian Socialist Workers' Party, the Hungarian Socialist Workers' Party Central Committee.

== Work ==
At the beginning of his career in Germany, England, and Ireland, Jánossy focussed on cosmic rays, both experiment and theory. His name is linked to Geiger's coincidence detector development with special application to cosmic-ray secondary components created in the upper layers of the atmosphere (mesons such as kaons, muons, gamma rays). He demonstrated how primary cosmic rays colliding with the Earth's atmosphere produced secondary penetrating showers cascading to the surface of the earth (1940–1941).

From an early age to his death, he had a wide-ranging interest in the mathematical and statistical aspects of physical analysis, and, in particular, the application of probability and calculus to experimental results in nuclear physics and particle physics. He is known for his statistical analysis methods for cosmic rays. Specifically, during his stay in Dublin, he completed his classic monograph on cosmic rays (1948) and published important monographs on particle showers (1950), introducing the eponymous joint probability densities—now called Jánossy densities—in the theory of random point processes.

Until the 1950s, the most important field in the research of high-energy particles was the investigation of cosmic radiation. But as the large accelerators started to take over the leading role, Jánossy turned away from the investigation of cosmic radiation and focussed on theoretical problems of quantum mechanics, the dual character of light, as well as the theory of relativity.

Together with KFKI colleagues, he carried out a famous low-intensity interference experiment, a quantum-mechanical process in which low-intensity photon beams interfere with themselves—although the experiments originally sought to refute this possibility. These interference results involving a small number of photons are significant for appreciating the quantum nature of light. The measurements he carried out in connection with the dual character of light (self-interference of few photons) supplied results that were expected on the basis of quantum mechanics; yet, due to the requirements of extremely high accuracy, measurements of this kind had not been carried out before Jánossy. Spurred by this famous photon experiment, Schrödinger was quick to write a letter, in which he emphasized the importance of the result. In both the measurement of cosmic radiation and the low intensity interference experiment, precision of the correct results is of fundamental importance, which justified Jánossy's interest in the statistical evaluation of measurements.

In the last one and a half decades of his theoretical activity, he was engaged in the hydrodynamic model of quantum mechanics and the interpretation problems of the theory of relativity. He had an interest in the physics philosophy of interpretation, and practical aspects of physics education and the promotion of physics as well. He was also active in the organization of public scientific. From 1953 until his death, he co-edited the Hungarian Physical Journal, and he was a member of the editorial board of Acta Physica Hungarica and Hungarian Science, as well as Foundations of Physics.

== Memberships and awards ==
Member (1950) and, later, vice-president (1961 to 1973) of the Hungarian Academy of Sciences; member of the Bulgarian Academy of Sciences (1961), the Royal Irish Academy (1949), the Mongolian Academy of Sciences and the Academy of Sciences of the German Democratic Republic (1954).

Awarded the Kossuth Prize (1951); Academic Gold Medal (1972); Vice chair of the Eötvös Physical Society (1950–1969); chair of the National Atomic Energy Commission. From 1966 till his death, president of the Hungarian Stamp Collectors' Association.

The Eötvös Physical Society in 1994 established the Jánossy Lajos Award, for outstanding research in the field of theoretical and experimental physics.

== Main works ==
- Cosmic Rays, Oxford, Clarendon Press, 1948, 424p. Online copy
- Cosmic Rays, Dublin, Dublin Institute for Advanced Studies, 1947, 56p.
- Cosmic rays and nuclear physics, London, Pilot Press, 1948, p. 186.
  - English: cosmic radiation, Budapest, Educated People, 1954, p. 137.
  - Italian: Raggi cosmici e fisica nucleare, Milano, Bompiani, 1954, p. 275.
  - German: Einführung in die kosmische Strahlenforschung, Berlin, Deutscher Verlag der Wissenschaften, 1955, p. 148.
  - Polish: Promienie kosmiczne, Warszawa, Wiedza Powszechna, 1956, p. 158, p.
  - Bulgarian: Kosmični Lač Sofia, Akad, 1957, 141p.
  - Russian: Kosmičeskie Luči, Moscow, 1949, 464p.
- Philosophical analysis of the special theory of relativity, Budapest, Central Research Institute of Physics, 1960, p. 76.
  - English: Philosophical remarks on special relativity, Budapest, Central Research Institute for Physics, 1960, p. 62.
- Überlegungen zu den Grundlagen der Wahrscheinlchikeitsrechnung, Berlin, Akademie-Verlag, 1960, 23p.
- Reflections of the problem measuring the velocity of light, Budapest, Central Research Institute of Physics, 1963, p. 42.
- Nuclear Lexicon, chief editor: Jánossy Lajos, Budapest, Academic, 1963, p. 453.
- The relativity of philosophical problems, Budapest, Academic, 1963, p. 351 (Elek Tibor version)
- The problem of the Lorentzian relativity principle, explaining, ed. Theodore Siklos, Budapest, Central Research Institute for Physics, 1964, 47 p.
- Theory and practice of the evaluation of measurements, Oxford, Clarendon Press, 1965, p. 481.
  - Russian: Teorija praktika obrabotka rezul'tatov izmerenij, Moscow, Mir, 1965, p. 462.
  - English: Measurement results of evaluation theory and practice, Budapest, Academic, 1968, p. 527.
- Fundamentals of probability theory and in particular the use of some measurement results to evaluate, Budapest, Textbook Publishers, 1965, 206p.
- Relativity and physical reality, Budapest, Thought, 1967, p. 327.
  - English: Theory of relativity based on physical reality, Budapest, Academic, 1971, p. 317.
  - Bulgarian: Teorijata na i otnositelnostta fizičeskata dejstvitelnost, Sofia, Akad, 1973, 269p.
  - Japanese: Butsurigakuteki sotaisei riron, Tokyo, Kodansha, 1974, p. 384.
- Physics,I–III. Budapest, Textbook Publishers, 1969–1971. (Stephen Főzy and György Kulin)
- Papers published from 1934 to 1971, I– vols. Budapest, Central Research Institute of Physics, 1962–1971.
- Probability, Budapest, Textbook Publishers, 1972, 61p. (Peter Tasnádi)
- Vector Computer, Budapest, Textbook Publishers, 1973, 470p. (Peter Tasnádi)
- Theory of relativity based on physical reality, Budapest, Academic, 1973, p. 311.
- Visual calculus: functions to differentiation, Budapest, Textbook Publishers, 1974, 166 p. (Stephen Jánossy).
- Intuitive integral calculus Budapest, Textbook Publishers, 1974, p. 154 (Stephen Jánossy).
- Chapters in mechanics, ed. Eagle elemer, Budapest, Minerva, 1975, p. 151.
- Vector Computer, I–III. Budapest, Textbook Publishers, 1980–1983. (Peter Tasnádi and Peter Gnädig rel)
- Integrating vectors, Budapest, Franklin, 1983, p. 398 (Tasnádi Peter and Peter Gnädig)
- Vectors and tensors differentiating, Budapest, Franklin, 1989, p. 253.

== See also ==
- List of Hungarian astronomers
