= Ferenc Jánossy =

Hungarian economist and engineer

- Born: 3 July 1914; Budapest, Hungary
- Died: 18 March 1997 (aged 82); Budapest, Hungary
- Relatives: Lajos Janossy
- Awards: State Prize of the Hungarian People's Republic 1973

Ferenc Jánossy (3 July 1914 – 18 March 1997) was a Hungarian economist and engineer. He also published in Germany under the name Franz Jánossy. Jánossy's field of research included economic development and understanding the development and legality of economic trends.

== Life and career ==
Together with his brother Lajos Jánossy, who later became a recognised astrophysicist, and his adoptive father György Lukács, an influential Marxist philosopher and politician, he first fled to Austria in 1920, and later lived in Germany from 1930-1933. From 1933-1945 Jánossy resided in the former Soviet Union, where he graduated in engineering in Moscow, but also had to spend three years in Siberian camps. After the Second World War he became deputy director of the Hungarian Office for Technical Planning of Heavy Industry. Jánossy was senior department head of the Hungarian State Planning Office from 1954-1956 and from 1957-1974 head of the National Institute of Planning Economics. From 1967 he taught at the Corvinus University of Budapest and from 1972-74 he was a visiting professor at the Free University of Berlin.

He was a member of the Hungarian Communist Party until 1956.

== Field of research and views ==
Jánossy gained notoriety with his 1966 publication, which examined the recovery periods after the World War II in each country and concluded that the recovery period does not end when production returns to pre-war levels, but only when the volume of production returns to the trend line of economic development. In 1969, he also criticised the so-called "economic miracles" of the post-war period because, in his view, they only lasted until the countries' production levels reached the level they would have had to reach without war. In this union Jánossy became a co-founder of the reconstruction theory, which believes that the German Wirtschaftswunder was created solely, by his own efforts.

== Awards and recognition ==
Jánossy received the State Prize of the Hungarian People's Republic in 1973. In 1996 he was awarded the György Lukács Memorial Medal. Shortly before his death in 1997 he was awarded the Civil Degree of the Order of Merit of the Republic of Hungary.

In 2006, the Faculty of Economics of the Óbuda University founded a college of higher education called Ferenc Jánossy Vocational College in honour of Jánossy.

== Selected publications ==
- A gazdasági fejlettség mérhetősége és mérési módszere. Budapest, KJK: 1963
- A gazdasági fejlődés trendvonala és a helyreállítási periódusok. Budapest, KJK: 1966
- Das Ende der Wirtschaftswunder. Frankfurt: Verl. Neue Kritik: 1969
- Gazdaságunk mai ellentmondásainak eredete és felszámolásuk útja. Közgazdasági Szemle, 1969, XVI. évf. 7–8. sz. pp. 806–829.
- Wie die Akkumulationslawine ins Rollen kam: Zur Entstehungsgeschichte des Kapitalismus. Berlin: Olle & Wolter, 1979
