= Gyula Ortutay =

Hungarian ethnographer and politician

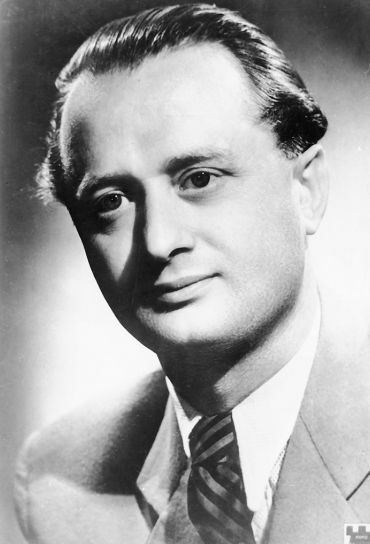

Minister of Religion and Education of Hungary
- In office 14 March 1947 – 25 February 1950
- Preceded by: Dezső Keresztury
- Succeeded by: József Darvas

Personal details
- Born: 24 March 1910 Szabadka, Austria-Hungary
- Died: 22 March 1978 (aged 67) Budapest, People's Republic of Hungary
- Party: FKGP
- Spouse: Zsuzsa Kemény
- Children: Mária; Tamás; Zsuzsanna
- Profession: ethnographer, politician

Gyula Ortutay (24 March 1910 – 22 March 1978) was a Hungarian ethnographer and politician, who served as Minister of Religion and Education between 1947 and 1950.

== Biography ==
=== Early life ===
Born in Szabadka (now: Subotica, Serbia) to a Catholic petty bourgeois family. His parents were István Ortutay journalist, editor of the Szegedi Napló and Ilona Borsodi. He finished his secondary school studies at the piarists in Szeged. After that he attended the Franz Joseph University from 1928. His psychology teacher was Hildebrand Dezső Várkonyi. Soon he was making left-wing friends such as Miklós Radnóti, Gábor Tolnai, Dezső Baróti, Ferenc Erdei, György Buday and Viola Tomori.

He married Zsuzsa Kemény, who served as chairperson of the Hungarian Dance Association from 1948, in 1938. They have three children: Mária (psychologist), Tamás (ceramist) and Zsuzsanna (district nurse).

=== Political career ===
He got into contact with the communist intellectuals (László Orbán, Gyula Kállai, Ferenc Hont) in the end of the 1930s. but Endre Bajcsy-Zsilinszky had the largest effect on him. From 1942 he participated in the antifascist movements. In the next year he joined the Independent Smallholders, Agrarian Workers and Civic Party (FKGP). He was Secretary-General of the National Council of The People's Patriotic Front.

== See also ==
- 2043 Ortutay

Political offices
Preceded by Dezső Keresztury	Minister of Religion and Education; 1947–1950	Succeeded by József Darvas
