= Dezső Keresztury =

Hungarian poet and politician

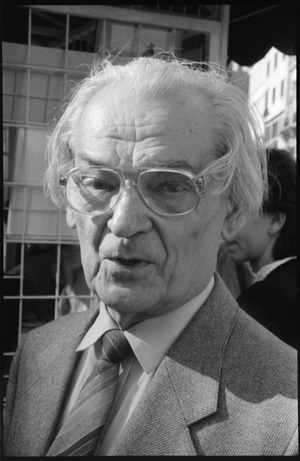
- Kerezstury in 1988

Minister of Religion and Education of Hungary
- In office 15 November 1945 – 14 March 1947
- Preceded by: Géza Teleki
- Succeeded by: Gyula Ortutay

Personal details
- Born: 6 September 1904; Zalaegerszeg, Austria-Hungary
- Died: 30 April 1996 (aged 91); Budapest, Hungary
- Political party: National Peasant Party
- Spouse(s): Mária Seiber; Mária Novák
- Profession: writer, poet, politician

Dezső Keresztury (6 September 1904 – 30 April 1996) was a Hungarian poet and politician, who served as Minister of Religion and Education between 1945 and 1947. He became a member of the Hungarian Academy of Sciences in 1982.

Political offices
Preceded by Géza Teleki	Minister of Religion and Education; 1945–1947	Succeeded by Gyula Ortutay
