= HD 54475 =

B-type main-sequence star in the constellation Puppis

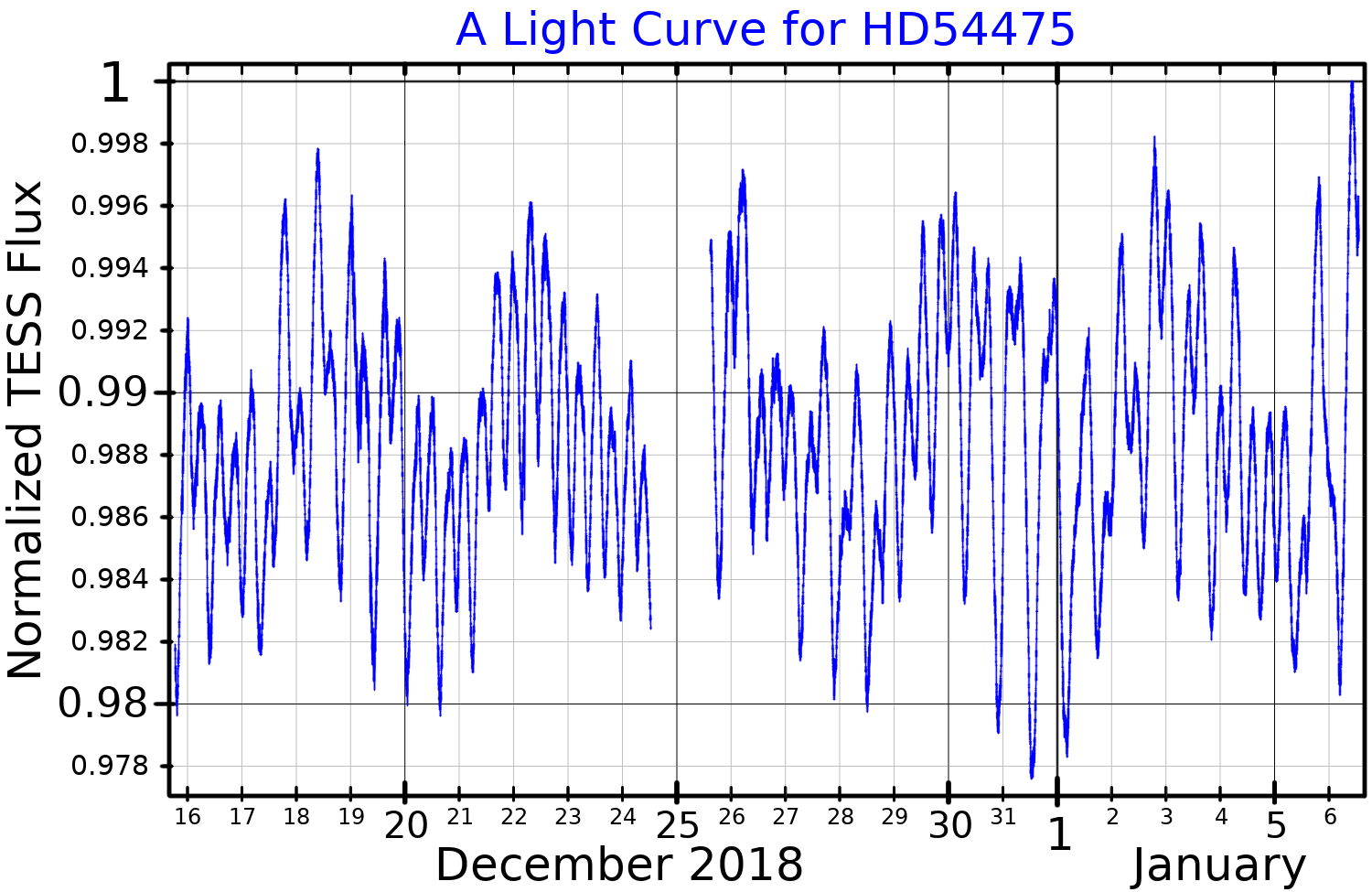
- A light curve for HD 54475, plotted from TESS data

Observation data Epoch J2000 Equinox J2000
- Constellation: Puppis
- Right ascension: 07^{h} 07^{m} 07.078^{s}
- Declination: −40° 53′ 35.77″
- Apparent magnitude (V): 5.783±0.009

Characteristics
- Evolutionary stage: main sequence
- Spectral type: B3V
- Variable type: SPB

Astrometry
Radial velocity (R_{v})	6±3.2 km/s
Proper motion (μ)	RA: −10.554 mas/yr Dec.: +11.163 mas/yr
Parallax (π)	4.5288±0.0584 mas
Distance	720 ± 9 ly (221 ± 3 pc)
Absolute magnitude (M_{V})	−1.08

Details
Mass	5.4 M_{☉}
Radius	3.4 R_{☉}
Luminosity	2,609 L_{☉}
Surface gravity (log g)	3.62 cgs
Temperature	24,260 K
Rotational velocity (v sin i)	200 km/s
Age	15.8±0.3 Myr

Other designations
- CD−40 2930, HD 54475, HIP 34339, HR 2691, SAO 218465, TIC 157533670, TYC 7633-2698-1, WISE J070707.07-405335.6

Database references
SIMBAD	data

HD 54475, also known as D Puppis, is a B-type star and a pulsating variable in the constellation of Puppis. It has an apparent magnitude of 5.783, which is enough to be visible to the unaided eye. (Note: According to the Bortle scale) The distance to D Puppis, based on a parallax of 4.53±0.06 mas from the Gaia satellite, is 720 light-years.

== Characteristics ==
This is a B-type main-sequence star with a spectral type of B3V. It has times the mass of the Sun and 3.4 times the Sun's radius. It radiates 2,609 times the solar luminosity from its outer atmosphere at a temperature of 24,360 K. Its age is estimated to be of about 15 million years.

HD 54475 has been classified as a slowly pulsating B-type star, but it has not been formally named as a variable star. The General Catalogue of Variable Stars lists it as a suspected variable with an amplitude of less than a tenth of a magnitude.

== Sources ==
- Stift, Martin (19 April 1979). "Light Variations of HD 54475". Information Bulletin on Variable Stars. 1586 (1586). Konkoly Observatory, Budapest: Commission 27 of the IAU: 1. Bibcode:1979IBVS.1586....1S.
