= Maunakea Spectroscopic Explorer =

Telescope

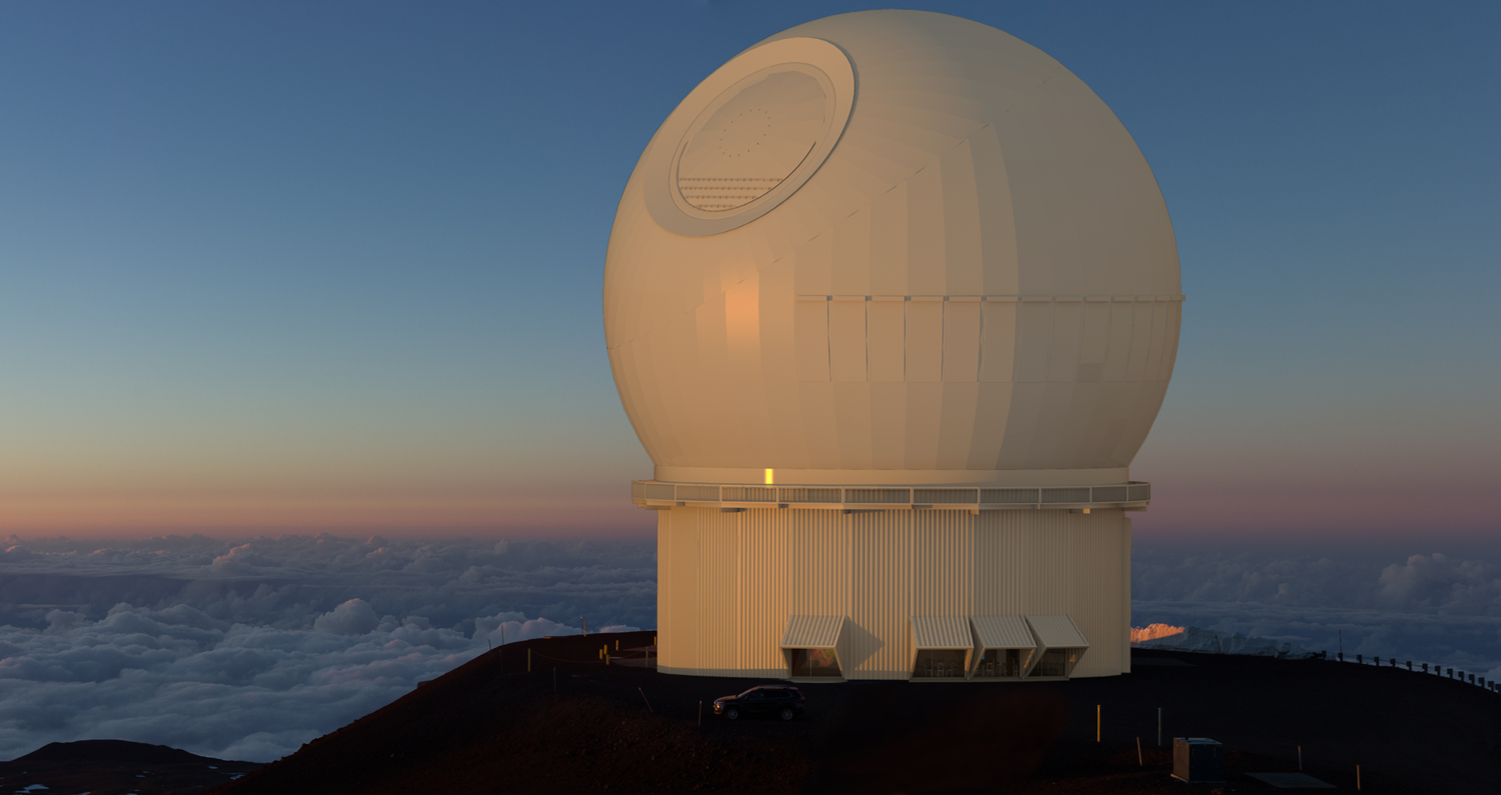
- Maunakea Spectroscopic Explorer at sunset
- Part of: Mauna Kea Observatories
- Coordinates: 19°49′31.1″N 155°28′12″W
- Wavelength: 360–18000 nm
- Diameter: 11.25 m
- Collecting area: 78.5 square meters
- Mounting: Altazimuth
- Enclosure: Calotte
- Location within Hawaii
- Related media on Commons

The Maunakea Spectroscopic Explorer (MSE) is a collaborative project to revitalize the Canada–France–Hawaii Telescope (CFHT). The group aims to replace the 1970s optical telescope with a modern segmented-mirror telescope and dedicated science instrumentation, while reusing the existing Maunakea summit building and facility. MSE will use an 11.25 meter aperture telescope and dedicated multiobject fibre spectroscopy instrumentation to perform survey science observations, collecting spectra from more than 4,000 astronomical targets simultaneously.

The project completed a conceptual design in early 2018. However, the 2022 Maunakea moratorium on new leases for telescopes delays decision-making on MSE until after 2030; as of late 2024 the CFHT Board has curtailed funding of any MSE activities for the time being.

== Background ==
=== Partnership and funding ===
The MSE project initially took shape through a feasibility study led by the National Research Council of Canada, which showed the strength of the science case for a large aperture dedicated multiobject spectroscopic facility, as well as the technical feasibility of such a facility as an upgrade to CFHT. In 2014, the CFHT established a project office in Waimea HI, to lead and develop the project through to the start of construction. The MSE participants in 2018 consists of national-level or state-level organizations in Canada, France, Hawai‘i, Australia, China and India, with CFHT Corp as the executive agency for the project. University groups in Spain also played a key design role in earlier phases of the project. The project is governed by a Management Group of members from each of the participants. The project design work is funded through cash managed by the Management Group and disbursed by CFHT Corp, as well as through in-kind work by most of the participants.

=== Construction approval process ===
Lead documents in the management of the Maunakea lands are the Mauna Kea Science Reserve Master Plan (June 2000) and the Mauna Kea Comprehensive Management Plan (2009 and 2010). The Master Plan explicitly recognizes CFHT as one of the summit sites that will be redeveloped, while the Comprehensive Management Plan prescribes the development and approval process. Although planned changes for MSE are of smaller impact than those categorized as “redevelopment” in the Master Plan and the state's Administrative Rules, MSE is subject to the approval processes that is defined in these documents and managed by Hawai‘i's Department of Land and Natural Resources (DLNR).

CFHT occupies the a site on Maunakea under a sublease to General Lease S-4191 between the State of Hawai‘i and the University of Hawai‘i (UH). The General Lease confers upon UH the rights and obligations to operate in and to manage the Mauna Kea Science Reserve until 31 December 2033. The UH is currently in the process of seeking a renewal of the General Lease. Before MSE will enter a construction phase, the project must have both the project approved by DLNR, as well as the ability to operate beyond 2033 under a renewed General Lease for the Maunakea Science Reserve.

== Project objectives ==
=== Science objectives ===
The science objectives for MSE were developed by a broadly based international science team, and are described in MSE's Detailed Science Case. The Detailed Science Case develops and justifies the science case for 12 observational surveys, each addressing a key science question, and groups those 12 cases into three science themes:

1. The Origin of Stars, Stellar Systems and the Stellar Populations of the Galaxy,
2. Linking Galaxies to the Large Scale Structure of the Universe, and
3. Illuminating the Dark Universe.

A set of six survey programs that are uniquely possible with MSE [ref] are used to define and constrain the technical characteristics of the observatory.

==== 1. Exoplanets and stellar astrophysics ====
MSE will provide spectroscopic characterization at high spectral resolution and high signal to noise ratio of the faint end (g ~16) of the PLATO target distribution, to allow for statistical analysis of the properties of planet-hosting stars as a function of stellar and chemical parameters. This will allow for highly complete statistical studies of the prevalence of stellar multiplicity into the regime of hot Jupiters for this and other samples, and also directly measure binary fractions away from the Solar Neighbourhood.

==== 2. Chemical tagging in the outer Milky Way ====
MSE will focus on understanding the outer components of the Galaxy: the halo, thick disk and outer disk - which are inaccessible to 4 metre class telescopes - largely through the use of its unique capability for chemical tagging experiments. Chemistry has the potential to be used in addition to, or instead of, phase space to reveal the stellar associations that represent the remnants of the building blocks of the Galaxy. MSE will push these techniques forward to help realize Freeman and Bland-Hawthorne's “New Galaxy"

==== 3. Probing the dynamics of dark matter ====
MSE will probe the dynamics of dark matter over all astronomical spatial scales. For Milky Way dwarf galaxies, MSE will obtain complete samples of tens of thousands of member stars to very large radius and with multiple epochs to identify and remove binary stars. Such analyses will allow the internal dark matter profile to be derived with high accuracy and will probe the outskirts of the dark matter halos that account for external tidal perturbations as the dwarfs orbit the Galaxy. In the Galactic halo, high precision radial velocity mapping of every known stellar stream will reveal the extent of heating through interactions with dark sub-halos and place strong limits on the mass function of dark sub-halos around an L* galaxy. On cluster scales, MSE will use galaxies, planetary nebulae and globular clusters as dynamical tracers to provide a fully consistent portrait of dark matter halos across the mass function.

==== 4. Examining the connection between galaxies and the large scale structure of the Universe ====
MSE will measure how galaxies evolve and grow relative to the dark matter structure in which they are embedded. This is done through mapping the distribution of stellar populations and supermassive black holes to the dark matter haloes and filamentary structures that dominate the mass density of the Universe, and doing so over all mass and spatial scales. MSE will provide a breakthrough in extragalactic astronomy by linking the formation and evolution of galaxies to the surrounding large-scale structure, across the full range of relevant spatial scales (from kiloparsecs to megaparsecs).

==== 5. Following time-variable events ====
MSE will perform spectroscopic follow-up of time-variable events discovered by LSST, SKA and other all-sky transient surveys. With its large multiplex advantage and good sky overlap with other surveys, MSE can provide large-aperture followup of faint transient events using a few fibres while simultaneously continuing uninterrupted observation of main survey programs with the remainder of the installed fibre set.

==== 6. The growth of supermassive black holes ====
MSE will undertake an extragalactic time domain program to measure directly the accretion rates and masses of a large sample of supermassive black holes through reverberation mapping. This information is essential for understanding accretion physics and tracing black hole growth over cosmic time. Reverberation mapping is the only distance-independent method of measuring black hole masses applicable at cosmological distances. MSE will greatly extend the few 10s of relatively low-luminosity AGN that currently have measurements of their black hole masses based on this technique.

=== Education and social responsibility ===
Complementing its science objectives MSE will enhance education, particularly STEM [Science, Technology, Engineering, and Mathematics] education, within the partner communities. While details of how MSE will be used to support education are being developed within those communities, CFHT has a proven track record with a number of innovative educational and community outreach programs, such as the Maunakea Scholars program, that engage the Hawai‘i community. Concepts proven through CFHT's existing projects have a broader applicability to the entire international partnership. Such programs will provide the basis for extending development projects into other STEM fields of study.

== Observatory design ==
=== Telescope and enclosure ===
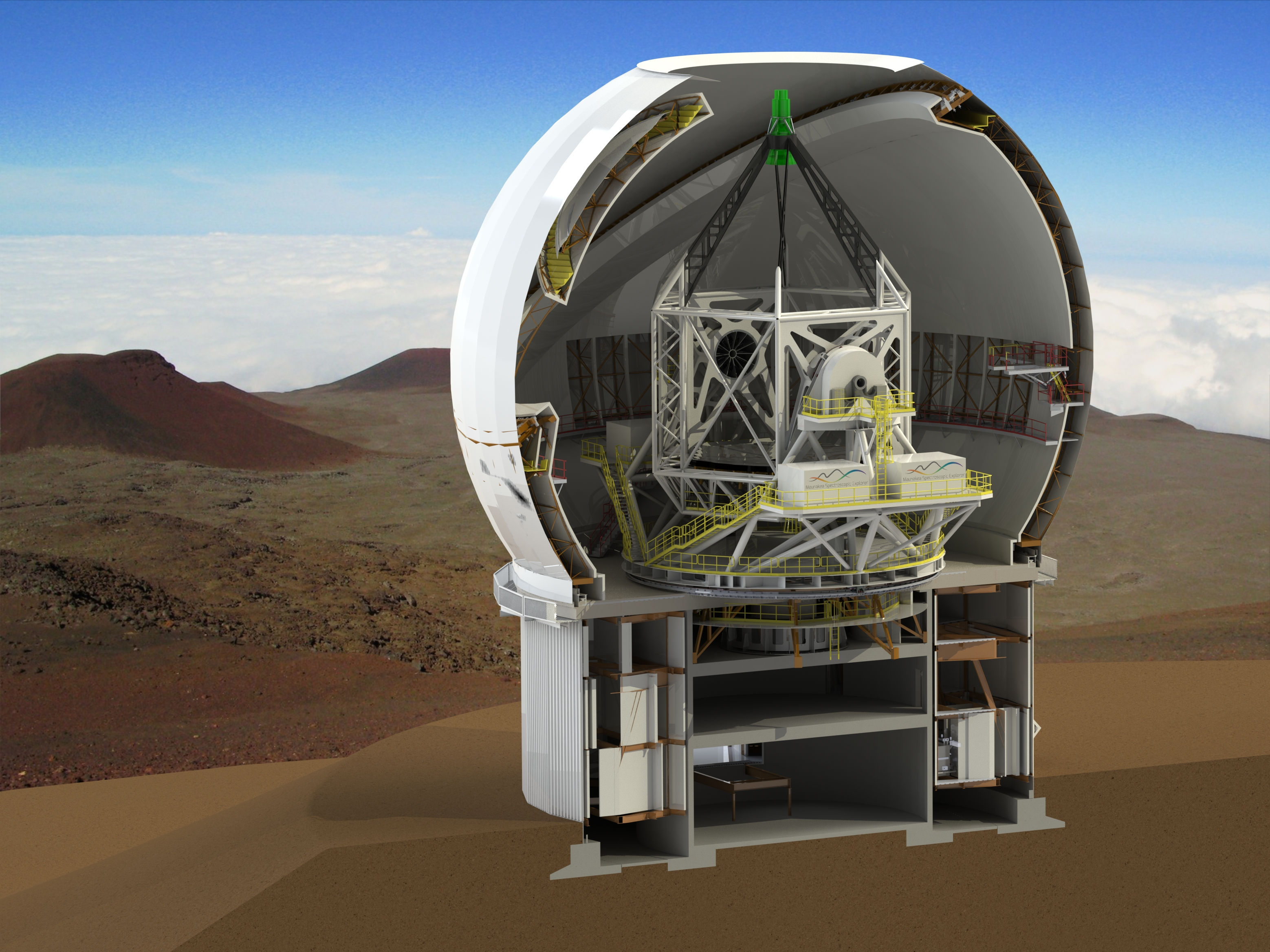
Cutaway view of the planned MSE summit facility, showing the telescope within the new telescope enclosure.

The MSE telescope will use an altitude-azimuth telescope mount supporting a segmented primary mirror with an effective aperture diameter of 10 meters. The mount concept is executed as a yoke-type structure and open space-frame telescope tube providing very good mechanical performance. The telescope is optically designed to be a prime focus telescope using a segmented primary mirror of 60 1.44m segments, delivering a circumscribed 11.25 meter aperture, and with a five element widefield corrector providing 1.5 square degrees of corrected field of view at the prime focus optical focal surface of the telescope. Compensation for atmospheric dispersion is an integral function of the widefield corrector optics. MSE's 11.25 meter aperture diameter necessitates replacing Canada-France-Hawai‘i Telescope's enclosure, designed for a 3.6 meter aperture telescope, with one that provides a suitable enclosure aperture while still being of a mass that the current building can support. A calotte style enclosure has been chosen as one that meets performance requirements, including good control of ventilation, while staying within the allowed mass and fiscal budgets.

The instrumentation package at the circular optical field of view is dominated by a hexagonal array of more than 4300 robotic fibre positioners, each of which samples the light at the focal surface with the tip of an optical fibre. Located in the outer chords between the hexagonal array of fibre positioners and the circular field of view are three imaging cameras used for telescope pointing acquisition, guidance, and focus measurement. A mechanical de-rotator stage keeps the instrumentation package stable in the sky coordinate system as the parallactic angle changes during observations.

=== Science instrumentation ===
Science data can be acquired in two possible spectral resolution modes: a high resolution of about R = 20,000 | 40,000, and a low/moderate resolution mode spanning R = 2,000 to R = 6,000. MSE is designed to be able to take spectra in both modes simultaneously during any observation. A fibre optic transmission system relays light gathered into the fibre tips at the telescope optical focal plane, to two banks of spectrometers that will measure the spectrum of the light gathered by each fibre. The fibre tips are positioned precisely at the position of astronomical interest in the focal plane by the array of remotely commandable tilting spine fibre positioners, each responsible for one fibre delivering light to one of the two spectrometer banks. The fibre transmission system uses high numeric aperture fibres to optically directly match the telescope focal ratio, and to provide good mechanical stability and optical throughput while minimizing focal-ratio degradation. The fibre core diameter, which sets the size of the sky sampled by each fibre tip, is different in those fibres used in the high resolution mode from those used in the low/moderate resolution mode, due to the difference in angular size of astronomical targets anticipated in each mode.

MSE's high resolution spectrometers are located within the concrete pier beneath the telescope. This bank of spectrometers measures spectra of light delivered by 1000 or more fibres, each dispersed in three spectral windows distributed over the visible light range of the instrument (360 nm to 900 nm). The low/moderate resolution spectrometers are located on the telescope, on outrigger platforms on the azimuth structure. This bank of spectrometers measures spectra of light delivered by 3200 or more fibres, each dispersed in four spectral windows. The windows provide continuous wavelength coverage over the visible and near-infrared bands from 360 nm to about 1.8 um when operated in their lowest resolution (a resolution of about 3,000), or about one-half the wavelength coverage when operated with moderate resolution (a resolution of about 6,000).

Science exposures are calibrated using both on-telescope and off-telescope lamps, and the twilight sky. During the observing night, on-telescope lamps illuminate the fibre inputs with lamps which give a broad continuum of energy over the wavelength range ("flats") and lamps which have a number of narrow-band emission lines ("arcs") such as hollow-cathode lamps. Lamp flat and arc calibration measurements are taken in the nighttime using the on-telescope calibration system, before and after every science observation, with the telescope mount and fibre positioner in the same observing configuration as used in the science observation. Lamp flat and arc calibration measurements are also taken in the daytime using the off-telescope calibration system, which can provide a measurement with higher signal to noise ratio. Lamp flats are also taken in a reference configuration of the telescope and positioner, to measure the relative energy of the twilight flats and the lamp flats. Twilight flat calibration measurements are used to give a more accurate representation of the energy distribution that the telescope sees during observation, than is possible with lamp calibration measurements alone.

=== Data ===
Scheduling MSE in an optimal way is a complex multi-faceted problem. Each "observing matrix" (one observation made at a single telescope pointing and suite of associated fibre positions) targets spectra from more than 4300 fibres pointing at objects selected from a few simultaneous surveys as well as calibration targets and targets of opportunity, and with spectrographs and indeed arms of spectrographs configured differently in each observing matrix. Objects are selected to be included in any observing matrix on the bases of science priority, time criticality, observing conditions, source brightness, sky brightness, calibration needs, and fibre yield (the fraction of fibre tips that can be placed on useful science objects). Software tools are being defined to automate steps in the operations sequence, going from survey definition to the delivery of science data. The final data product that MSE will deliver are 2-dimensional images of spectra, and 1-dimensional spectra, corrected for observatory signature, spectrally calibrated, and co-added where multiple measurements of the same object at the same resolution have been made. The data release policy will be finalized as the project approaches the start of construction, and is expected to include an immediate release of data to partner organization scientists and survey teams, and a later release to the public.

=== Maunakea summit facility ===
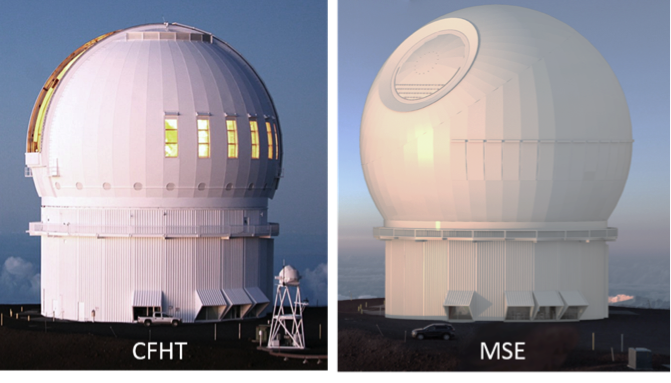

MSE is designed to achieve its science objectives with the least impact possible on the Maunakea summit both during construction and when operating the resultant observatory. The project is an upgrade to the existing CFHT facility, and predominantly is a replacement of the telescope, dome and instrumentation within the current building and re-using the current foundations without alterations. Some re-arrangement of equipment and space within the current building is necessary to meet the needs of MSE as well as those of building regulatory changes since the original construction, but the design objective is a building that looks substantially identical to the current CFHT summit building. The building internal structure will be improved to provide better performance during seismic events, and to accommodate the new enclosure and larger telescope. Other changes involve relocating equipment and labs to better exhaust heat away from the observing environment, and providing space for segmented mirror routine cleaning and coating operations.

While MSE will be operated remotely from the Waimea headquarters building for all nighttime operations, the summit building will continue to provide facilities for telescope and enclosure control during daytime engineering and maintenance work, as well as meeting workplace comfort and emergency staff safe haven needs.
