= Pavel Grošelj =

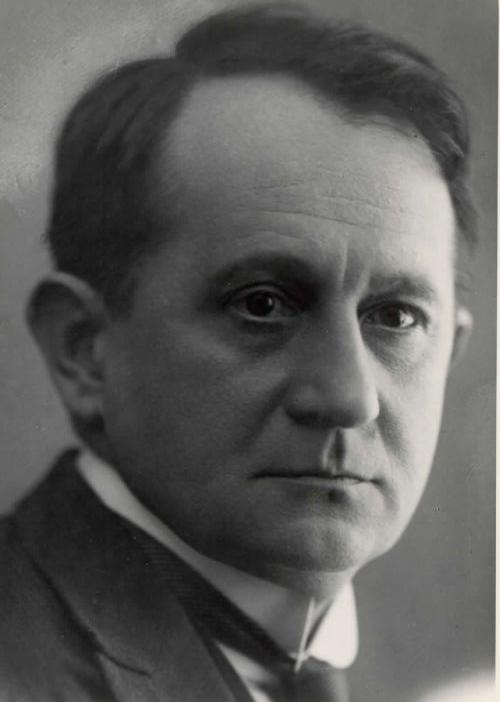
- Born: 9 February 1883; Ljubljana, then Austria-Hungary), now Slovenia
- Died: 26 January 1940 (aged 56); Zagreb, then Yugoslavia, now Croatia
- Education: University of Vienna
- Scientific career
- Institutions: University of Ljubljana

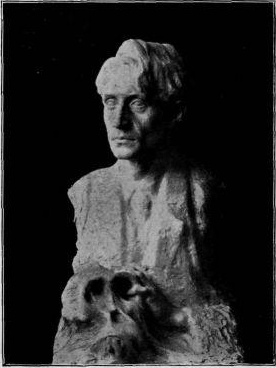
Portrait of Pavel Grošelj by Svitoslav Peruzzi (ca. 1904)

Pavel Grošelj (9 February 1883 – 26 January 1940) was a Slovene biologist and literary historian who was involved in the establishment and planning of a Slovene university (which became the University of Ljubljana). He was noted for various contributions to zoology and botany.

== Life ==
Pavel Grošelj was born in Ljubljana, then a town of Carniola (Austria-Hungary). He showed a great interest in the natural sciences and a gift for poetry from an early age. He graduated in biology from the University of Vienna in 1906; the following year he also completed his doctorate there. From 1908, he was a teacher in Ljubljana at two boys' grammar schools and at the girls' lycée. In 1909, he was entrusted with the task of lecturing on mineralogy in technical courses. In 1910 he was named honorary lector, and in 1923 honorary docent for general biology at the medical faculty of the University of Ljubljana. He ran and headed the institute for biology until his death. He was elected to the position of extraordinary professor in 1931, but he did not accept the position. He died in 1940 in Zagreb.

== Work ==
Grošelj was an editor of early scientific writings for the Ljubljanski zvon journal (1904–1905, 1910); his first texts were published in this journal between 1902 and 1904. He wrote the comparative literary study Prešeren in Petrarka in 1902 and his lecture France Prešeren from 1905 places him amongst the early academic authorities on Prešeren's life and works. Grošelj campaigned in favour of the establishment of a Slovene university (even as a freshman in lectures in Vienna). As a member of the commission tasked with this goal, he was later directly involved in the associated planning.

Grošelj worked for a number of reviews in his life. In 1933, the natural sciences section of the Muzejsko društvo za Slovenijo (Museum Society for Slovenia) began on his initiative to publish a paper entitled Proteus, for which Grošelj was chosen as the editor. He was also the editor of the academic bulletin Prirodoslovne razprave from 1931 to 1939. Some of his scientific writings were published in the book Vesolje-Zemlja-Človek (Space-Earth-Man) in 1957. He also wrote articles for non-academics and took part in debates on astronomy. At the time of his death, Grošelj had almost finished a work on the nervous system of jellyfish. He also left a theoretical study on the promorphology of organisms, and his lifework Splošna biologija (General biology) unfinished.

== Recognitions ==
Grošelj was depicted in ca. 1904 by the sculptor Svitoslav Peruzzi. He depicted him with a primate skull in his arms. The portrait was done in the Vienna Secession style.

The Prirodoslovno društvo Slovenije (Naturalists’ Society of Slovenia) has awarded the Grošelj plaque in his honour since 1984.
