= Debrecen Heliophysical Observatory =

Observatory in Hungary

Coordinates: 47.544151°N 21.624039°E

Debrecen Heliophysical Observatory is an astronomical observatory owned and operated by Konkoly Thege Miklós Astronomical Institute of Hungarian Academy of Sciences. The Observatory provides solar data and images of observation. Study solar flares and sunspots.

== See also ==
- List of astronomical observatories
