= Konkoly Observatory =

Astronomical observatory in Budapest, Hungary

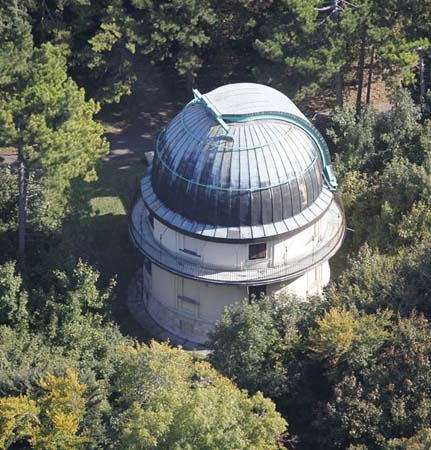
- Aerial photo of the 60 cm Heyde dome at Konkoly Observatory
- Alternative names: Konkoly Observatory of the Hungarian Academy of Sciences
- Organization: Hungarian Academy of Sciences
- Observatory code: 053
- Location: Budapest, Hungary
- Coordinates: 47°29′59″N 18°57′50″E
- Established: 1871
- Website: Konkoly Observatory
- Location of Konkoly Observatory
- Related media on Commons

Konkoly Observatory (Hungarian: HUN-REN Csillagászati és Földtudományi Kutatóközpont Konkoly Thege Miklós Csillagászati Intézet; obs. code: 053) is an astronomical observatory located in Budapest, Hungary is part of the Research Centre for Astronomy and Earth Sciences (Hungarian: Csillagászati és Földtudományi Kutatóközpont) and belongs to the HUN-REN Magyar Kutatási Hálózat. Konkoly Observatory was founded in 1871 by Hungarian astronomer Miklós Konkoly-Thege (1842–1916) as a private observatory, and was donated to the state in 1899. Konkoly Observatory, officially known as HUN-REN CSFK Konkoly Thege Miklós Csillagászati Intézet in Hungarian, is the largest astronomical research institute in Hungary, and hosts the largest telescopes in the country. The Observatory has more than 60 researchers, a quarter of them are non-Hungarian.

The main research areas include stellar structure and evolution, stellar and solar activity, variable stars, star and planetary formation, interstellar material, exoplanets, cosmology, large sky survey, Solar System studies, nuclear and extragalactic astrophysics, high energy astrophysics including supernovae, gamma-ray bursts and other transient events, radio astronomy, galactic archeology, designing and manufacturing astronomical instrumentation and cubesats, as well as history of astronomy. The institute has a close collaboration with Hungarian universities, the researches teach and supervise students at ELTE and Szeged Universities. Konkoly Observatory runs the assistant researcher (Hungarian: demonstrátor program introducing undergraduate students to scientific research and using astronomical telescopes and instruments. The Observatory hosted 7 Lendület-grants, 2 ERC-projects and several national large infrastructure projects (GINOP).

As well as performing astronomical research, the observatory published the Information Bulletin on Variable Stars on behalf of the International Astronomical Union.

== History ==
=== The Ógyalla and Svábhegy Observatories ===
Hungarian nobleman Miklós Konkoly-Thege founded his private observatory in 1871 at Hurbanovo, in Northern Hungary, known as Ógyalla in Hungarian at the time. The instrumentation included a 6" refractor, a 10.5" Browning reflector (later replaced with a 10" Merz refractor), a meridian circle, a spectrograph, as well as various meteorological and geomagnetic instruments. Konkoly-Thege, who had no offspring, became increasingly afraid over time that his legacy will perish with his death. As a member of the Hungarian Parliament, he was able to convince the government to take the observatory into state property. In 1899, the Hurbanovo site was renamed to Royal Konkoly-founded Astrophysical Observatory, and operated under the direction of Konkoly-Thege and Radó Kövesligethy, a renowned geophysicist of the time. The main scientific profile of the institute was the photometry of stars, the observation of the Sun, meteor counting, and providing time service for the government. In 1913, an order for a 60 cm (24") telescope was finalized with the German Heyde company, but with the start of World War I, the telescope was never built.

After the end of World War I, Ógyalla became part of the newly formed Czechoslovak Republic. The government transferred the scientific equipment to Budapest before the newly formed border was shut down, and in 1921 allocated a new property in the Buda Hills just west to Budapest to build a new astronomical observatory. The new building, known as the Svábhegy observatory after a nearby hill, was finished by 1924, and the 6" refractor and the re-ordered 60 cm Heyde telescope were set up in new domes by 1928. Scientific work in the observatory focussed on the light variations of pulsating stars, the orbits of binary stars, and searching for asteroids. Measurements were made with photographic plates and wedge photometers.

The observatory survived World War II with minor damages. In late 1944, observations were put on hold, and the optical elements of the telescopes were removed to protect them from aerial bombings. Soviet troops occupied the buildings from December 1944 until February 1945, but the library and the photographic laboratories were spared. Observations were resumed by July 1945.

After the communist takeover of Hungary in 1948, a new network of research institutes, independent from universities, was set up under the Hungarian Academy of Sciences (HAS). The observatory was renamed to the Astronomical Institute of the HAS, but retained the traditional name, Konkoly Observatory, in English correspondences. With the communist isolation of the country, international relations shifted from predominantly German and American to Soviet and Eastern-bloc partnerships. However, the international recognition of then director László Detre kept some connections to the West alive. During one of his visits to the Western bloc, Detre received an RCA 1P21 photomultiplier tube from American astronomer Harlow Shapley to start photometric measurements at the observatory in 1948. He subsequently smuggled in to the country despite the strict trade restrictions at the time. In 1957, after the launch of Sputnik, multiple independent satellite observing and tracking stations were set up in the country at the suggestion of the Soviet Union. The institute provided coordination for these stations, and in 1966, the Baja station merged into the institute.

Relations with the West soon eased and at the 1961 General Assembly of the International Astronomical Union at Berkeley, the institute was tasked with setting up and circulating the Information Bulletin on Variable Stars. The Bulletin was envisaged to be a rapid communications platform between variable star observers, but it later expanded into a peer-reviewed journal for short papers and notes about variable stars.

The institute expanded in the 1960-70s with the foundation and subsequent independence of the Debrecen Heliophysical Observatory and the installation of new telescopes at Piszkéstető Mountain Station. In 1982, the observatories in Debrecen and Budapest were merged back together to form the Research Institute for Astronomy of the HAS. In 1992, the Baja station was separated from the institute and handed over to the county council of Bács-Kiskun.

In 2012, the Hungarian Academy of Sciences reorganized the structure of its institute network: the Astronomical Institute was merged with three other entities (Institutes for Geography, Geochemistry, and Geodesy and Geophysics) to form the Research Center for Astronomy and Earth Sciences. In 2019, the Hungarian government transferred the research institute network of the academy, including the Research Center for Astronomy and Earth Sciences, to a newly formed entity called Eötvös Loránd Kutatási Hálózat (Eötvös Loránd Research Network).

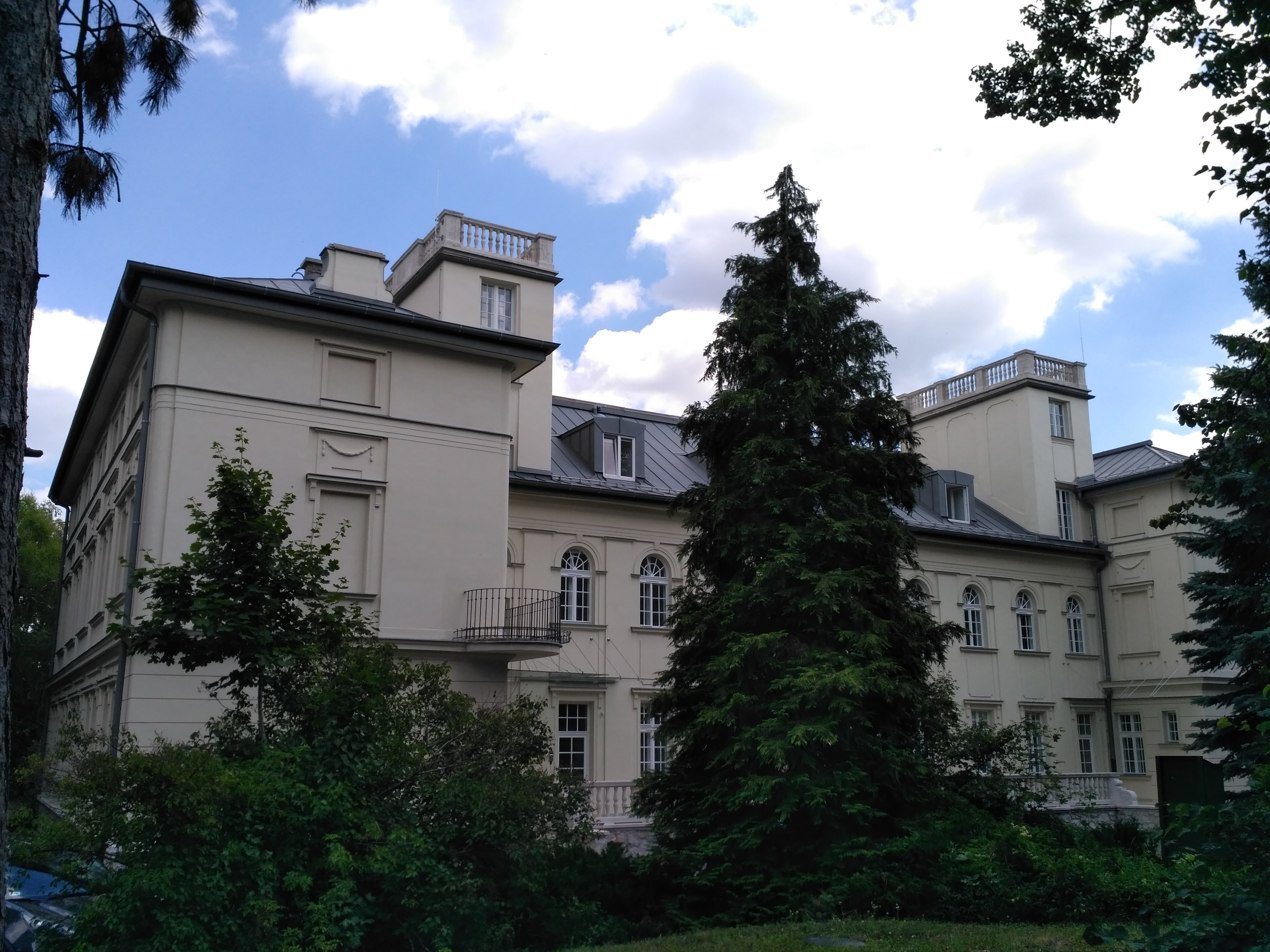
The main building of the observatory.

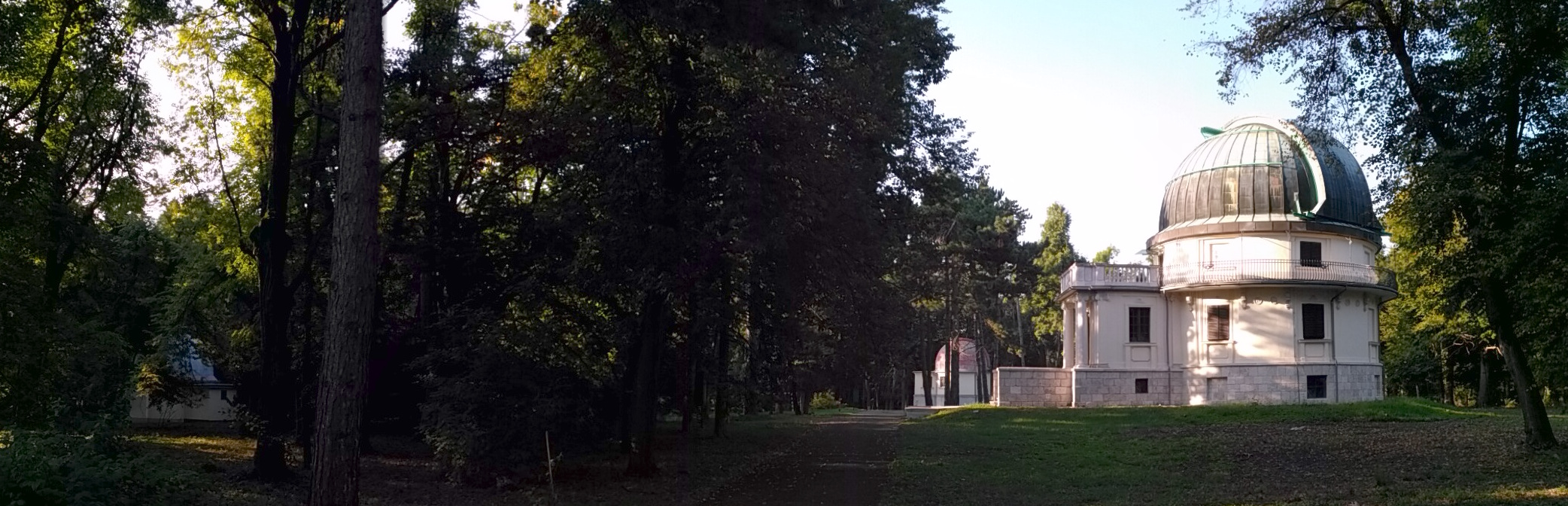
Telescope domes at Konkoly Observatory in Budapest. From left: the 6", 7" and 24" domes. The latter houses the 60 cm Heyde refractor.

=== Debrecen Heliophysical Observatory ===
In 1946, a new Solar physics department was initiated under the leadership of Lóránt Dezső. In 1958, the department moved to Debrecen to form a new solar observatory independent of the Astronomical Institute. Observations of the Sun started with two photoheliograph telescopes, one of which was relocated to the top of the water tower at Gyula in 1972. In 1973, a large coronagraph telescope with a 53 cm aperture was set up, but observations were hindered by the cumbersome mechanical setup. Given the low elevation of the observatory of just 124 m above sea level, the coronagraph was only capable to observe the chromosphere of the Sun, not the corona itself.

The main scientific output of the observatory has been the detailed documentation of the photospheric activity of the Sun. The positions, sizes, structures of sunspots and sunspot groups are determined and recorded daily, to provide long-term, homogeneous observations of the Sun. The Debrecen Photoheliographic Data (DPD) database is the direct continuation of the Greenwich Photoheliographic Results that were collected between 1874 and 1976. Originally, analog photographs and CCD images were collected locally, or from partner observatories, but with the advent of reliable space-based observations, the work transitioned to the analysis of images from the SOHO and SDO spacecraft. Further data products include the reanalysis of the Greenwich catalog, and older observations based on Hungarian drawings of the Sun.

In 1982, the observatory merged back into the Konkoly Astronomical Institute, and became a department of it once again. In 2015, the old observatory building in Debrecen was deemed unfeasible to maintain, and was closed down. The coronagraph was disassembled, and offices and personnel were transferred to the ATOMKI institute of the HAS in Debrecen. Given that space-based imagery has superseded the ground-based observations as the input source of the databases, the two photoheliographs were also decommissioned and removed from their mounts at Debrecen and Gyula.

=== Piszkéstető Mountain Station ===
In 1951, the observatory secured funding for a new mapping telescope. The initial order was for a 0.9 m, f/3 Sonnefeld telescope but it was soon modified for a 60/90 com Schmidt telescope. With the light pollution of Budapest steadily increasing, a more remote location was sought for the telescope. After settling for Piszkéstető peak in the Mátra mountains, about 80 km away from the capital, a residence building was constructed in 1960, and the new Schmidt telescope was installed in 1962. The telescope provided a 10°x10° field of view with photographic plates and could be equipped with an objective prism for low-resolution mass spectroscopic observations. The large field-of-view led to numerous supernova and asteroid discoveries at the time.

In 1966, a smaller, 0.5 m Cassegrain telescope with a two-channel photoelectric photometer was installed.

Finally, a 1 m Ritchey-Chrétien-coudé (RCC) telescope was installed in 1974, for high-resolution imaging and photometry of fainter targets. This marked the end of the initial development of Piszkéstető station.

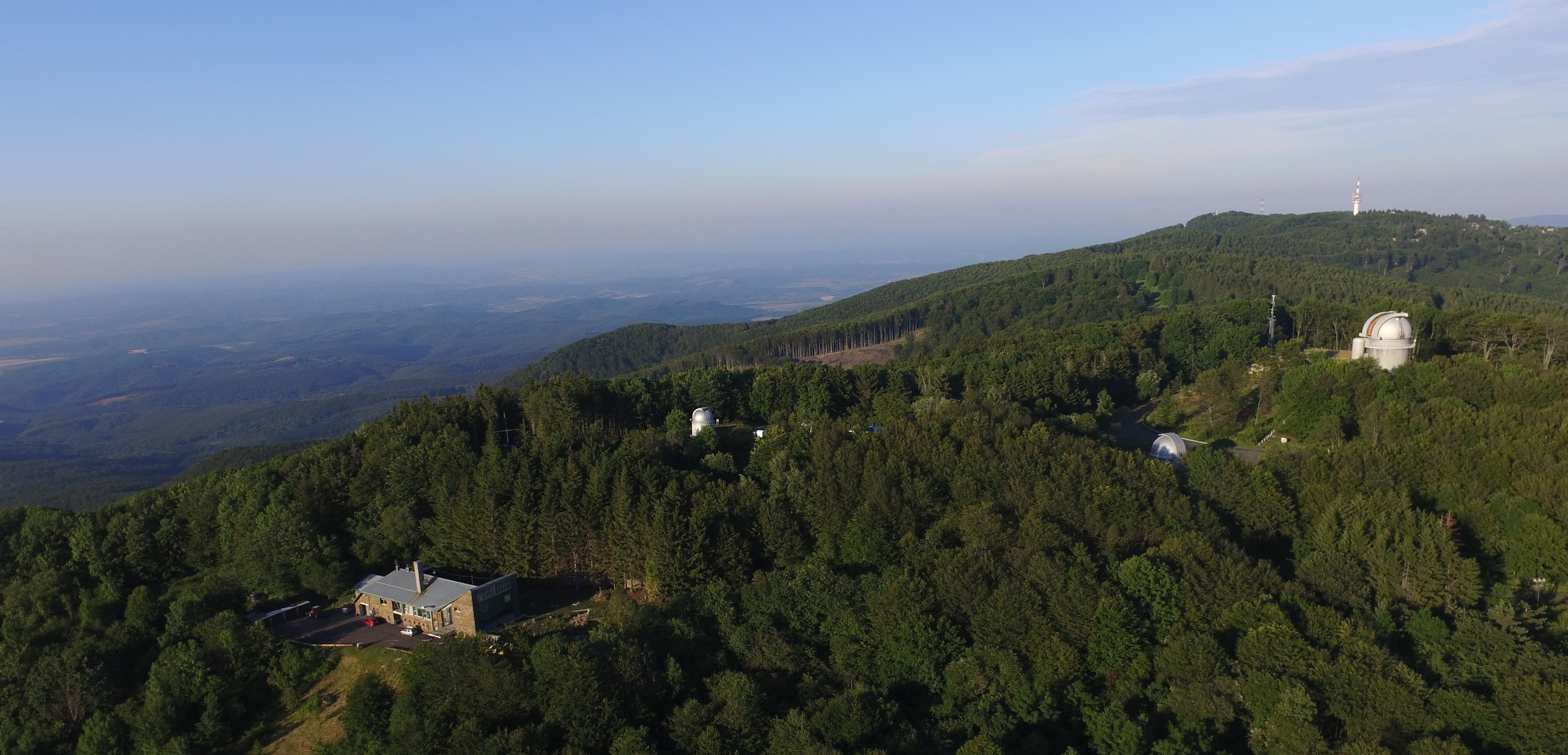
Aerial image of Piszkéstető Mountain Station of the Konkoly Observatory in the Mátra hills.

In the late 1990s, photographic plates and photometers were replaced with CCD cameras on the Schmidt and RCC telescopes. In 2015, an echelle spectrograph with a spectral resolution of R=20,000 was installed on the RCC telescope.

A 40 cm Ritchey-Chrétien telescope was set up in 2010, intended for automated remote observations. The telescope is currently under refurbishment.

The Fly's Eye system, consisting of 19 small cameras to observe the whole sky above 30° altitude simultaneously, was installed in 2016.

A new, automated 0.8 m telescope to track transient events, e.g., supernovae, is expected to be installed in 2018.

Piszkéstető also hosts other instrumentations, including a seismic and gravimetric station of the Institute for Geophysics and Geodesy, and an infrasound detector array.

== Management ==
=== Former directors ===
- 1899–1916 Miklós Konkoly-Thege
- 1916–1936 Antal Tass
- 1936–1938 Károly Móra
- 1938–1943 Károly Lassovszky
- 1943–1974 László Detre
- 1974–1996 Béla Szeidl
- 1997–2009 Lajos Balázs
- 2010–2015 Péter Ábrahám
- 2016–2018 László Kiss

=== Current director ===
- from 1 January 2019: Róbert Szabó

== Main research areas ==
- Variable stars, stellar photometry, space-based photometry, exoplanets.
- Astrochemistry, nuclear astrophysics, stellar dust. Includes the RADIOSTAR (Radioactivities from Stars to Solar Systems) ERC project.
- Fly's Eye group: instrumentation and time-domain astronomy.
- Small bodies in the Solar system: moons, TNOs, centaurs, comets, near-Earth asteroids, debris disks around other stars.
- Protoplanetary disks and planet formation, star formation, infrared astronomy. Includes the SACCRED (Structured Accretion Disks) ERC project.
- Solar and stellar activity, Doppler-imaging, differential rotation in stars, magnetic activity and dynamos, sunspot tracking.
- Laboratory astrophysics and geochemistry, meteorites, planetary surfaces.
- High-energy astrophysics, statistics of gamma-ray bursts.
- Transient astrophysical objects (GINOP program).
- Cosmic effects and risks (GINOP program).

== Research groups ==
- Astrophysical and Geochemical Laboratory (Ákos Keresztúri)
- Konkoly Space Astronomy, Planet and Star Formation Group (Dr. Péter Ábrahám, Dr. Ágnes Kóspál)
- Stellar Pulsation, Space Photometry and Exoplanets Group (SPEX) (Róbert Szabó)
- MTA–CSFK Lendület Nuclear Burning in Stars Research Group (Maria Lugaro)
- STARK (Stellar Activity Research at Konkoly Observatory) (Zsolt Kővári)
- Solar System Research Group (Csaba Kiss)
- Large-Scale Structure (LSS) MTA Lendület Research Group (András Kovács)
- Konkoly Extragalactic Astronomy Group (József Vinkó)
- Instrument and Satellite Development Research Group (András Pál)

== Nomenclature ==
The observatory has had many different designations over the years. The current formal designation of the observatory is "Konkoly Observatory, Research Centre for Astronomy and Earth Sciences" (Hungarian: ELKH Csillagászati és Földtudományi Kutatóközpont, Konkoly Thege Miklós Csillagászati Intézet). A former name, Svábhegyi Csillagvizsgáló, has been revived and used as branding for the public events and exhibitions hosted in the observatory and the 24" inch dome in particular.

== Publications ==
The observatory publishes multiple periodicals. The most important one was the Information Bulletin on Variable Stars, established by the IAU in 1961 that contained peer-reviewed papers about variable star research and discoveries. Since 2011, IBVS was published as an online-only, open-access, APC-free journal. Since 10 March 2019, IBVS no longer accepts new submissions, thus the active phase of the journal ended.

Larger amounts of observational data and proceedings of meetings and conferences have been published in the Communications of the Konkoly Observatory (originally published under various Hungarian and German titles, like Mitteilungen der Sternwarte Budapest/Svábhegy, and later as Mitteilungen der Sternwarte der Ungarishen Akademie der Wissenshaften). The observatory also published a few issues of Monographs (for History of Astronomy topics) and Occasional Technical Notes.

== Equipment ==
Current equipment and locations:

- 1 m RCC telescope (Piszkéstető). The main instrument, equipped with a medium-resolution echelle spectrograph and an EMCCD camera.
- 60/90 Schmidt telescope (Piszkéstető).
- 50 cm Cassegrain telescope (Piszkéstető). Removed.
- 40 cm Ritchey-Crétien telescope (Piszkéstető). Under renovation.
- Fly's Eye all-sky camera system (Piszkéstető).
- 80 cm telescope – installed at the dome of the former 50 cm Cassegrain telescope (Piszkéstető).
- 60 cm Heyde Newton/Cassegrain telescope (Budapest). Decommissioned after 2013, it has been renovated for public demonstrations.
- 7" coudé refractor (Budapest). Decommissioned.
- coronagraph. Originally in Debrecen, decommissioned and disassembled.
- 5" photoheliograph (Debrecen). Decommissioned.
- 6" photoheliograph (Gyula). Decommissioned.

== International collaborations ==
- Space telescopes and space probes: Herschel (ESA); Kepler (NASA); GAIA (ESA); TESS (NASA), SPICA (ESA/JAXA, pre-development), ARIEL (ESA), PLATO (ESA), Comet Interceptor (ESA), JUICE (ESA), Rosetta (ESA)
- Ground based telescopes, instruments: Opticon (H2020), Matisse (ESO)
- Sky surveys: SDSS, LSST, MSE (Mauna Kea Spectroscopic Explorer), WEAVE
- Nuclear astrophysics experiments and collaborations: Underground Laboratory for Nuclear Astrophysics LUNA at LNGS (Gran Sasso, Italy); Jinping Underground laboratory for Nuclear Astrophysics JUNA (China); GALAH (GALactic Archaeology with HERMES) stellar spectroscopic survey (Australia); US NSF Joint Institute for Nuclear Astrophysics JINA; NuGRID-collaboration; Chemical Elements as Tracers of the Evolution of the Cosmos (European COST Action)
- Laboratory astrophysics: EXODRILTECH (ESA), NEOMETLAB (ESA)

== See also ==
- Open access in Hungary (publishing)
- List of astronomical observatories
