= Hungarian People's Republic =

Country in Central Europe (1949–1989)

Hungarian People's Republic Magyar Népköztársaság (Hungarian)
- 1949–1989
- Top: Flag (1949–1956); Bottom: Flag (1957–1990) Top: Emblem (1949–1956); Bottom: Emblem (1957–1990)
- Motto: Világ proletárjai, egyesüljetek! ("Proletarians of all countries, unite!")
- Anthem: "Himnusz"^{[a]} (English: "Hymn")
- The Hungarian People's Republic in 1989
- Status: Satellite state of the Soviet Union, member of the Warsaw Pact and Comecon
- Capital and largest city: Budapest; 47°26′N 19°15′E
- Official languages: Hungarian
- Religion: Secular state (de jure)
- Demonym: Hungarian
- Government: Communist state
- De facto leader
  - 1949–1956: Mátyás Rákosi
  - 1956: Ernő Gerő
  - 1956–1988: János Kádár
  - 1988–1989: Károly Grósz
  - 1989: Rezső Nyers
- Presidential Council
  - 1949–1950 (first): Árpád Szakasits
  - 1988–1989 (last): Brunó Ferenc Straub
- Council of Ministers
  - 1949–1952 (first): István Dobi
  - 1988–1989 (last): Miklós Németh
- Legislature: Országgyűlés
- History
  - Communist coup: 31 May 1947
  - People's Republic: 20 August 1949
  - Admitted to the UN: 14 December 1955
  - Hungarian Revolution: 23 Oct.–11 Nov. 1956
  - New Economic Mechanism: 1 January 1968
  - Third Republic: 23 October 1989

Area
  - Total: 93,011 km^{2} (35,912 sq mi)

Population
  - 1949: 9,204,799
  - 1970: 10,322,099
  - 1990: 10,375,323
- GDP (PPP): 1989 estimate
  - Total: $64 billion
  - Per capita: $6,226
- HDI (1990 formula): 0.915 very high
- Currency: Forint (HUF)
- Time zone: UTC+1 (CET)
  - Summer (DST): UTC+2 (CEST)
- Date format: yyyy.mm.dd.
- Calling code: +36
- ISO 3166 code: HU
| Preceded by | Succeeded by |
| Second Hungarian Republic | Third Hungarian Republic |
- Today part of: Hungary
- a. "Himnusz" was used before and after the Communist era as Hungary's national anthem. As its lyrics include the word "God", the Communists tried but failed to create an alternative anthem before deciding to use "Himnusz" without its words.

The Hungarian People's Republic (Note: Hungarian: Magyar Népköztársaság [ˈmɒɟɒr ˈneːpkøstaːrʃɒʃaːɡ]) was the Hungarian state from 20 August 1949 until the establishment of the current Republic of Hungary on 23 October 1989. It was a professed communist state, governed first by the Hungarian Working People's Party and after the Hungarian Revolution of 1956, the Hungarian Socialist Workers' Party. Both governments were closely tied to the Soviet Union as part of the Eastern Bloc.

The state considered itself the heir to the Hungarian Soviet Republic, which was formed in 1919 as one of the first communist states created after the Russian Soviet Federative Socialist Republic (Russian SFSR). It was designated a "people's democratic republic" by the Soviet Union in the 1940s. Geographically, it bordered Romania and the Soviet Union (via the Ukrainian SSR) to the east; Yugoslavia (via SRs Croatia, Serbia, and Slovenia) to the southwest; Czechoslovakia to the north and Austria to the west.

The Communists spent the next year and a half after the Moscow Conference consolidating their hold on power and weakening the other parties. This culminated in October 1947, when the Communists told their non-Communist coalition partners that they had to cooperate with a reconfigured coalition government if they wanted to stay in the country. The process was more or less completed in 1949, when a newly elected legislature chosen from a single Communist-dominated list adopted a Soviet-style constitution, and the country was officially recast as a "people's republic."

The same political dynamics continued through the years, with the Soviet Union pressing and maneuvering Hungarian politics through the Hungarian Communist Party, intervening whenever it needed to, through military coercion and covert operations. Political repression and economic decline led to a nationwide popular uprising in October–November 1956 known as the Hungarian Revolution of 1956, which was the largest single act of dissent in the history of the Eastern Bloc. After initially allowing the Revolution to run its course, the Soviet Union sent thousands of troops and tanks to crush the opposition and install a new Soviet-controlled government under Kádár, killing thousands of Hungarians and driving hundreds of thousands into exile. By the early 1960s, however, the Kádár government had considerably relaxed its line, implementing a unique form of semi-liberal Communism known as "Goulash Communism". The state allowed imports of certain Western consumer and cultural products, gave Hungarians greater freedom to travel abroad, and significantly rolled back the secret police state. These measures earned Hungary the moniker of the "merriest barrack in the socialist camp" during the 1960s and 1970s.

One of the longest-serving leaders of the 20th century, Kádár would finally retire in 1988 after being forced from office by even more pro-reform forces amidst an economic downturn. Those influences remained supreme until the late 1980s, when turmoil broke out across the Eastern Bloc, culminating with the fall of the Berlin Wall and the Soviet Union's dissolution. The Communist Party abandoned power a little over a year after Kádár's retirement, paving the way for free elections in 1990. Despite the end of communist control in Hungary, the 1949 constitution remained in effect after being almost completely rewritten to reflect the country's transition to liberal democracy. On 1 January 2012, the 1949 constitution was replaced with the current constitution.

== History ==
=== Formation ===
Following the occupation of Hungary by the Red Army, Soviet military occupation ensued. After seizing most material assets from German hands, the Soviets tried to control Hungarian political affairs, with some success. Using force, the Red Army set up police organs to persecute the opposition, assuming this would enable the Soviet Union to seize the upcoming elections, together with intense communist propaganda to attempt to legitimize their rule. Despite all efforts, in the elections of November 1945 the Hungarian Communist Party was trounced by a Smallholder-led coalition, receiving only 17% of votes. The coalition, under Prime Minister Zoltán Tildy, thus frustrated the Kremlin's expectations of ruling through a democratically elected government.

The Soviet Union, however, intervened through force once again, resulting in a puppet government that disregarded Tildy, placed communists in important ministerial positions, and imposed several restrictive measures, like banning the victorious coalition government and forcing it to yield the Interior Ministry to a nominee of the Hungarian Communist Party.

Communist Interior Minister László Rajk established the ÁVH secret police, in an effort to suppress political opposition through intimidation, false accusations, imprisonment and torture. In early 1947, the Soviet Union pressed the leader of the Hungarian Communists, Mátyás Rákosi, a surviving member of the Soviet Republic's government, to take a "line of more pronounced class struggle". American observers likened communist machinations to a coup and concluded that "the coup in Hungary is Russia's answer to our actions in Greece and Turkey", referring to US military intervention in the Greek Civil War and the building of US military bases in Turkey pursuant to the Truman Doctrine.

Rákosi complied by pressuring the other parties to push out those members not willing to do the Communists' bidding, ostensibly because they were "fascists". Later on, after the Communists won full power, he referred to this practice as "salami tactics". Prime Minister Ferenc Nagy was forced to resign as prime minister in favour of a more pliant Smallholder, Lajos Dinnyés. In the 1947 elections, the Communists became the largest party, but were well short of a majority. The coalition was retained with Dinnyés as prime minister.

In October 1947, Rákosi dropped all pretense of liberal democracy. He gave the non-Communist parties an ultimatum: cooperate with a new, Communist-dominated coalition government or go into exile. In short order, most of the other parties' more courageous members were pushed out, leaving them in the hands of fellow travellers willing to do the MKP's bidding.

In June 1948 the Communists forced the Social Democrats to merge with them to form the Hungarian Working People's Party (MDP). However, the few independent-minded Social Democrats were quickly shunted aside, leaving the MDP as a renamed and enlarged Communist Party. Rákosi then forced Tildy to turn over the presidency to Social Democrat-turned-Communist Árpád Szakasits. In December, Dinnyés was replaced by the leader of the Smallholders' left wing, the openly pro-Communist István Dobi.

At the elections of May 1949, voters were presented with a single Communist-dominated list, comprising candidates from all parties and running on a common programme. By this time, there was virtually no opposition left in the country. On 18 August, the newly elected National Assembly passed a new constitution – a near-carbon copy of the Soviet constitution. When it was officially promulgated on 20 August, the country was renamed the "Hungarian People's Republic."

=== Stalinist era (1949–1956) ===
Rákosi, now the de facto leader of Hungary, demanded complete obedience from fellow members of the Hungarian Working People's Party. Rákosi's main rival for power was László Rajk, who was then Hungary's Foreign Secretary. Rajk was arrested and Stalin's NKVD emissary coordinated with Hungarian General Secretary Rákosi and his State Protection Authority to lead the way for the show trial of Rajk. At the September 1949 trial, Rajk made a forced confession, claiming that he had been an agent of Miklós Horthy, Leon Trotsky, Josip Broz Tito and Western imperialism. He also admitted that he had taken part in a murder plot against Mátyás Rákosi and Ernő Gerő. Rajk was found guilty and executed. Despite their helping Rákosi to liquidate Rajk, future Hungarian leader János Kádár and other dissidents were also purged from the party during this period. During Kádár's interrogation, the ÁVH beat him, smeared him with mercury to prevent his skin pores from breathing, and had his questioner urinate into his pried-open mouth. Another notable show trial at the beginning of Rákosi's rule was the Trial of the Generals (1950).

Rákosi thereafter imposed totalitarian rule on Hungary. At the height of his rule, Rákosi developed a strong cult of personality. Dubbed the "bald murderer", Rákosi imitated Stalinist political and economic programs, resulting in Hungary experiencing one of the harshest dictatorships in Europe. He described himself as "Stalin's best Hungarian disciple" and "Stalin's best pupil".

Hungary in the Stalinist era (1949–1956)

National Flag

National Emblem

Flag of the Hungarian Working People's Party

Emblem of the State Protection Authority

The government collectivized agriculture and it extracted profits from the country's farms to finance rapid expansion of heavy industry, which attracted more than 90% of total industrial investment. At first Hungary concentrated on producing primarily the same assortment of goods it had produced before the war, including locomotives and railroad cars. Despite its poor resource base and its favorable opportunities to specialize in other forms of production, Hungary developed new heavy industry in order to bolster further domestic growth and produce exports to pay for raw-material import.

Rákosi rapidly expanded Hungary’s education system, focusing on equal opportunity and adherence to Marxist-Leninist thought. This was mostly in attempt to replace the educated class of the past by what Rákosi called a new "working intelligentsia". As part of an effort to separate the Church from the State, religious instruction was denounced as propaganda and was gradually eliminated from schools. Rákosi‘s education reforms resulted in better education for the poor, more opportunities for working-class children and increased literacy in general.

Cardinal József Mindszenty, who had opposed the German Nazis and the Hungarian Fascists during the Second World War, however, did support the Miklós Horthy dictatorship, and was arrested in December 1948 and accused of treason. After five weeks under arrest, he confessed to the charges made against him and he was condemned to life imprisonment. The Protestant churches were also purged and their leaders were replaced by those willing to remain loyal to Rákosi's government.

The new Hungarian military hastily staged public, prearranged trials to purge "Nazi remnants and imperialist saboteurs". Several officers were sentenced to death and executed in 1951, including Lajos Tóth, a 28 victory-scoring flying ace of the World War II Royal Hungarian Air Force, who had voluntarily returned from US captivity to help revive Hungarian aviation. Many executed prisoners were later cleared posthumously.

Rákosi's government became increasingly unpopular, and when Joseph Stalin died in 1953, Mátyás Rákosi was replaced as prime minister by Imre Nagy. However, he retained his position as general secretary of the Hungarian Working People's Party and over the next three years the two men became involved in a bitter struggle for power.

As Hungary's new leader, Imre Nagy removed state control of the mass media and encouraged public discussion on changes to the political system and liberalizing the economy. This included a promise to increase the production and distribution of consumer goods. Nagy also released political prisoners from Rákosi's numerous purges of the Party and society.

On 9 March 1955, the Central Committee of the Hungarian Working People's Party condemned Nagy for rightist deviation. Hungarian newspapers joined the attacks and Nagy was accused of being responsible for the country's economic problems and on 18 April he was dismissed from his post by a unanimous vote of the National Assembly. Rákosi once again became the leader of Hungary.

Rákosi's power was undermined by a speech made by Nikita Khrushchev in February 1956. He denounced the policies of Joseph Stalin and his followers in Eastern Europe. He also claimed that the trial of László Rajk had been a "miscarriage of justice". On 18 July 1956, Rákosi was forced from power as a result of orders from the Soviet Union. However, he did manage to secure the appointment of his close friend, Ernő Gerő, as his successor.

On 3 October 1956, the Central Committee of the Hungarian Working People's Party announced that it had decided that László Rajk, György Pálffy, Tibor Szőnyi and András Szalai had wrongly been convicted of treason in 1949. At the same time it was announced that Imre Nagy had been reinstated as a member of the party.

=== Revolution of 1956 ===
The Hungarian flag with the 1949–1956 coat of arms cut out of it. This became the symbol of the uprising in 1956.

The Hungarian Revolution of 1956 began on 23 October as a peaceful demonstration of students in Budapest. The students protested for the implementation of several demands including an end to Soviet occupation. The police made some arrests and tried to disperse the crowd with tear gas. When the protesters attempted to free those who had been arrested, the police opened fire on the crowd, provoking rioting throughout the capital.

Early the following morning, Soviet military units entered Budapest and seized key positions. Citizens and soldiers joined the protesters chanting "Russians go home" and defacing communist party symbols. The Central Committee of the Hungarian Working People's Party responded to the pressure by appointing the reformer Imre Nagy as the new prime minister.

On 25 October, a mass of protesters gathered in front of the Parliament Building. ÁVH units began shooting into the crowd from the rooftops of neighboring buildings.

Some Soviet soldiers returned fire on the ÁVH, mistakenly believing that they were the targets of the shooting. Supplied by arms taken from the ÁVH or given by Hungarian soldiers who joined the uprising, some in the crowd started shooting back.

Imre Nagy then went on Radio Kossuth and announced he had taken over the leadership of the Government as Chairman of the Council of Ministers of the Hungarian People's Republic. He also promised "the far-reaching democratization of Hungarian public life, the realisation of a Hungarian road to socialism in accord with our own national characteristics, and the realisation of our lofty national aim: the radical improvement of the workers' living conditions".

On 28 October, Nagy and a group of his supporters, including János Kádár, Géza Losonczy, Antal Apró, Károly Kiss, Ferenc Münnich and Zoltán Szabó, managed to take control of the Hungarian Working People's Party. At the same time revolutionary workers' councils and local national committees were formed all over Hungary.

The change of leadership in the party was reflected in the articles of the government newspaper, Szabad Nép (i.e. Free People). On 29 October the newspaper welcomed the new government and openly criticised Soviet attempts to influence the political situation in Hungary. This view was supported by Radio Miskolc, which called for the immediate withdrawal of Soviet troops from the country.

On 30 October, Imre Nagy announced that he was freeing Cardinal József Mindszenty and other political prisoners. He also informed the people that his government intended to abolish the one-party state. This was followed by statements of Zoltán Tildy, Anna Kéthly and Ferenc Farkas concerning the restitution of the Smallholders Party, the Social Democratic Party and the Petőfi (former Peasants) Party.

Nagy's most controversial decision took place on 1 November when he announced that Hungary intended to withdraw from the Warsaw Pact and proclaim Hungarian neutrality. He asked the United Nations to become involved in the country's dispute with the Soviet Union.

On 3 November, Nagy announced the details of his coalition government. It included communists (János Kádár, György Lukács, Géza Losonczy), three members of the Smallholders Party (Zoltán Tildy, Béla Kovács and István Szabó), three Social Democrats (Anna Kéthly, Gyula Keleman, Joseph Fischer), and two Petőfi Peasants (István Bibó and Ferenc Farkas). Pál Maléter was appointed minister of defence.

Nikita Khrushchev, the leader of the Soviet Union, became increasingly concerned about these developments and on 4 November 1956 he sent the Red Army into Hungary. Soviet tanks immediately captured Hungary's airfields, highway junctions and bridges. Fighting took place all over the country but the Hungarian forces were quickly defeated.

During the Hungarian Uprising, an estimated 20,000 people were killed, nearly all during the Soviet intervention. Imre Nagy was arrested and replaced by Soviet loyalist János Kádár as head of the newly formed Hungarian Socialist Workers' Party (Magyar Szocialista Munkáspárt, MSZMP). Nagy was imprisoned until being executed in 1958. Other government ministers and supporters who were either executed or died in captivity included Pál Maléter, Géza Losonczy, Attila Szigethy and Miklós Gimes.

=== Changes under Kádár ===
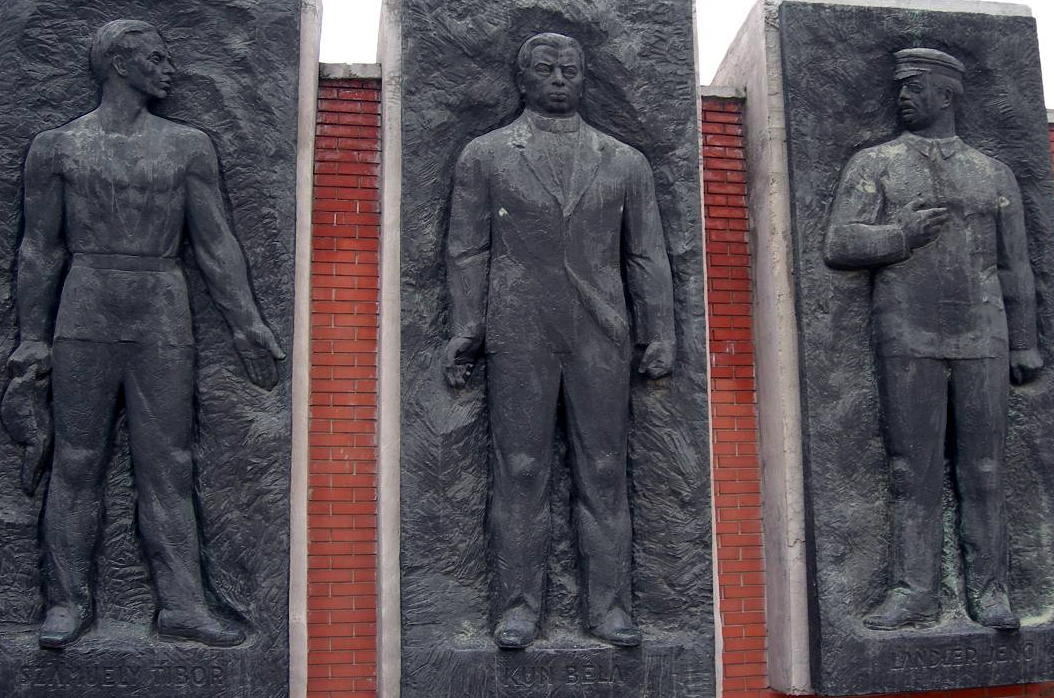
Monument in Budapest, dedicated to the leaders of the short-lived Hungarian Soviet Republic of 1919, Tibor Szamuely, Béla Kun, Jenő Landler

Hungary changed its flag on 12 October 1957. The coat of arms depicting the emblem of the Hammer and Wheat was removed from its pure tricoloured flag.

First Kádár followed retributions against the revolutionaries. 21,600 dissidents were imprisoned, 13,000 interned, and 400 executed. But in the early 1960s, he announced a new policy under the motto "He who is not against us is with us", a variation of Rákosi's quote: "He who is not with us is against us". He declared a general amnesty, gradually curbed some of the excesses of the secret police, and introduced a relatively liberal cultural and economic course aimed at overcoming the post-1956 hostility towards him and his regime. Homosexuality was decriminalized in 1961.

In 1966, the Central Committee approved the "New Economic Mechanism", which moved away from a strictly planned economy towards a system more reminiscent of the decentralized Yugoslav model. Over the next two decades of relative domestic quiet, Kádár's government responded alternately to pressures for minor political and economic reforms as well as to counter-pressures from reform opponents. Dissidents (the so-called "Democratic Opposition", Demokratikus ellenzék) still remained closely watched by the secret police however, particularly during the anniversaries of the 1956 uprising in 1966, 1976, and 1986.

By the early 1980s, it had achieved some lasting economic reforms and limited political liberalization and pursued a foreign policy which encouraged more trade with the West. Nevertheless, the New Economic Mechanism led to mounting foreign debt, incurred to subsidize unprofitable industries. Many of Hungary's manufacturing facilities were outmoded and unable to produce goods that were salable on world markets. Despite this, they succeeded in obtaining sizable financial loans from Western countries. During a 1983 visit to Hungary, Soviet leader Yuri Andropov expressed interest in adopting some of the country's economic reforms in the Soviet Union.

Hungary remained committed to a pro-Soviet foreign policy and openly criticized US president Ronald Reagan's deployment of intermediate-range nuclear missiles in Europe. In a speech to the CPH's youth organization in 1981, Kádár said "The forces of capitalism are trying to distract attention from their mounting social problems by stepping up the arms race, but there can be no prospect for mankind other than that of peace and social progress." In 1983, Vice President George H. W. Bush and the foreign ministers of France and West Germany visited Budapest, where they received a friendly welcome, but the Hungarian leadership nonetheless reiterated their opposition to US missile deployment. They also cautioned the Western representatives not to mistake Hungary's economic reforms for a sign that the country would embrace capitalism.

Other events during Kadar's tenure were Hungarian aid and support of North Vietnam during the Vietnam War, severing relations with Israel following the Six-Day War, and the boycott of the 1984 Summer Olympics during the Soviet conflict in Afghanistan.

=== Transition to democracy ===
In 1985 Mikhail Gorbachev rose to power in the Soviet Union, and changed the course of its foreign policy. Hungary's transition to a Western-style democracy was one of the smoothest among the former Soviet bloc. By late 1988, activists within the party and bureaucracy and Budapest-based intellectuals were increasing pressure for change. Some of these became reformist social democrats, while others began movements which were to develop into parties. Young liberals formed the Federation of Young Democrats (Fidesz). A core from the so-called Democratic Opposition formed the Association of Free Democrats (SZDSZ) and the national opposition established the Hungarian Democratic Forum (Magyar Demokrata Fórum, MDF). Nationalist movements, such as the Jobbik, only reappeared after a rapid decline in nationalist sentiment following the establishment of the new Republic. Civic activism intensified to a level not seen since the 1956 revolution.

In 1988, Kádár was replaced as General Secretary of the MSZMP by Prime Minister Károly Grósz, and reformist communist leader Imre Pozsgay was admitted to the Politburo. In 1989, the Parliament adopted a "democracy package", which included trade union pluralism; freedom of association, assembly, and the press; and a new electoral law. A Central Committee plenum in February 1989 agreed in principle to give up the MSZMP's monopoly of power, and also characterized the October 1956 revolution as a "popular uprising", in the words of Pozsgay, whose reform movement had been gathering strength as Communist Party membership declined dramatically. Kádár's major political rivals then cooperated to move the country gradually to Western-style democracy. The Soviet Union reduced its involvement by signing an agreement in April 1989 to withdraw Soviet forces by June 1991.

While Grósz favoured reforming and refining the system, the "democracy package" went well beyond the "model change" he advocated to change the system within the framework of Communism. However, by this time, Grósz had been rapidly eclipsed by a faction of radical reformers including Pozsgay, Miklós Németh (who succeeded Grósz as prime minister later in 1988), Foreign Minister Gyula Horn, and Rezső Nyers, the original architect of the New Economic Mechanism. This faction now favoured a "system change"–jettisoning Communism altogether in favour of a market economy. By the summer of 1989, it was clear that the MSZMP was no longer a Marxist–Leninist party. In June, a four-man executive presidency replaced the Politburo. Three of its four members–Nemeth, Pozsgay and Nyers–came from the radical reform faction, with Nyers becoming party president. Grósz retained his title of general secretary, but Nyers now outranked him–effectively making Nyers the leader of Hungary.

National unity culminated in June 1989 as the country reburied Imre Nagy, his associates, and, symbolically, all other victims of the 1956 revolution. A national round table, comprising representatives of the new parties, some recreated old parties (such as the Smallholders and Social Democrats), and different social groups, met in the late summer of 1989 to discuss major changes to the Hungarian constitution in preparation for free elections and the transition to a fully free and democratic political system.

In October 1989, the MSZMP convened what would be its last congress. The party voted to disband and re-establish itself as the Hungarian Socialist Party (Magyar Szocialista Párt, MSZP), a Western European-style social democratic party with Nyers as its first president. Unable to slow down, let alone stop, the momentum toward a full "system change," Grósz eventually led a faction of Communists out of the MSZP to form a revived Hungarian Socialist Workers' Party, now the Hungarian Workers' Party.

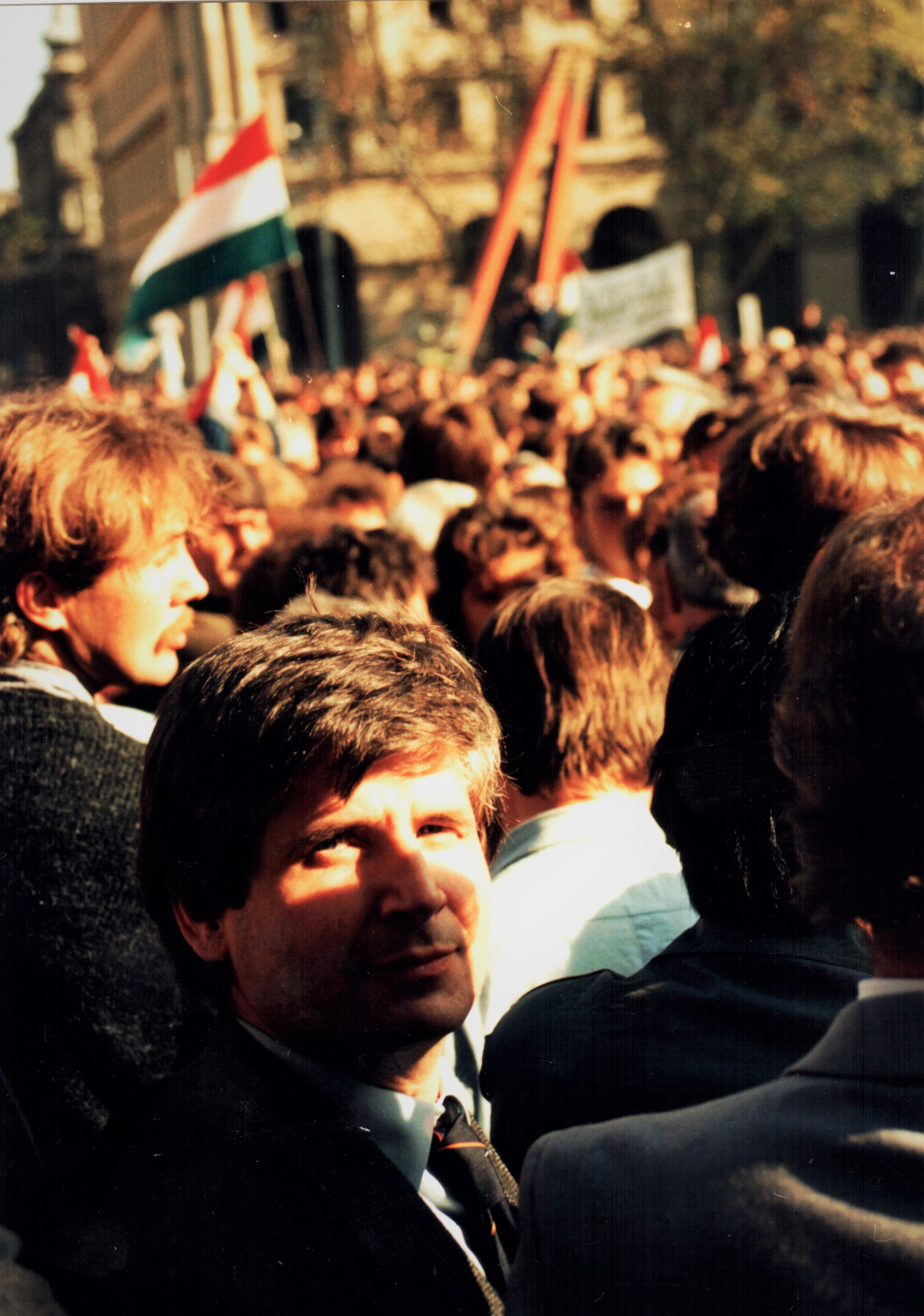
Proclamation of the Republic

The biggest changes by far came on 16–20 October 1989. In a historic session, Parliament adopted a package of nearly 100 constitutional amendments that almost completely rewrote the 1949 constitution. The package – the first comprehensive constitutional reform in the Soviet bloc – changed Hungary's official name to the Republic of Hungary and transformed the country from a one-party Marxist–Leninist state into a multiparty democracy. The revised constitution guaranteed human and civil rights, and created an institutional structure that ensured separation of powers among the judicial, executive, and legislative branches of government. The revised constitution also championed the "values of bourgeois democracy and democratic socialism" and gave equal status to public and private property. Although the now-dissolved MSZMP had already given up its monopoly of power in February, these changes marked the final legal step toward ending Communist rule in Hungary.

On the 33rd anniversary of the 1956 Revolution, 23 October, the Presidential Council was dissolved. In accordance with the constitution, parliament Speaker Mátyás Szűrös was named provisional president pending elections the following year. One of Szűrös' first acts was to officially proclaim the Republic of Hungary.

Hungary decentralized its economy and strengthened its ties with western Europe; in May 2004 Hungary became a member of the European Union.

== Economy ==
As a member of the Eastern Bloc, initially, Hungary was shaped by various directives of Joseph Stalin that served to undermine Western institutional characteristics of market economies, liberal democracy (considered as bourgeoisie democracy in Marxist thought), and rule of law. The Soviets modeled economies in the rest of the Eastern Bloc, such as Hungary, along Soviet command economy lines. Economic activity was governed by Five Year Plans, divided into monthly segments, which were drafted in order to meet plan targets for the period, and made use of methods such as material balance planning similar to other Soviet-type command economies.

Great social progress was made in this era. The percentage of the population between 20 and 24 years old with less than 8 years of education decreased from 71.2% in 1949 to 4.9% in 1984, the annual consumption of meat and fish increased from 35 kilograms in 1950 to 78 in 1984, the percentage of homes with electricity increased from 46.6% in 1949 to 99% in 1984, the percentage of homes with running water increased from 17.1% to 76.6%, the number of cars per 1,000 people increased from 3 in 1960 to 122 in 1984, televisions from 10 to 276, washing machines from 45 to 317, refrigerators from 4 to 328, and infant mortality (per 1,000 live births) fell from 91 in 1949 to 20.4 in 1984.

Per capita national income grew by 343% from 1950 to 1983 (4.6% per year), real wages by 136% and real incomes by 251% over the same period, while real value of per capita social benefits rose by 432% from 1960 to 1980. From 1949 to 1984, Hungary's GDP grew as fast as that of countries like Spain.

Poverty was greatly reduced, although from 1962 to 1982 the price index rose by 96%, people with less than 800 forints were 55% in 1962 and after 20 years only 6.4% of those with less than 1800 forints. In 1987, inequality was minimal, with a Gini coefficient of 0.21, and poverty was the same, with a 1% poverty rate (poverty line: $120 PPP per person per month).

The plans prioritized investment for producer goods over consumer goods. Consumer goods soon began to lack in quantity, resulting in a shortage economy, and lack of user feedback without other incentives for innovation led to a lack of quality as well. Overall, the inefficiency of later economic systems without mechanisms for feedback present in other economies, such as competition, market-clearing prices or subsidies for innovation became costly and unsustainable. Housing shortages emerged. The near-total emphasis on large low quality prefabricated apartment blocks, such as Hungarian Panelház, was a common feature of Eastern Bloc cities in the 1970s and 1980s. Even by the late 1980s, sanitary conditions were generally far from adequate. Only 60% of Hungarian housing had adequate sanitation by 1984, with only 36% of housing having piped water.

The GDP per capita of Hungary, and the Eastern Bloc as a whole, lagged behind that of Western Europe. A contributing factor is that, in contrast to Hungary, some of the Western European economies, despite being also ravaged from WWII, benefited from the Marshall Plan from the United States, whose economy had expanded rapidly during the war and immediate post-war period. Hungary did not receive financial assistance from the Molotov Plan of the Soviet Union, which also forbade Hungary from joining the Marshall Plan.

== Legacy ==
According to a 2020 poll conducted by Policy Solutions in Hungary, 54% percent of Hungarians say that most people had a better life under communism, while 31% say most people are better off now.
