= Trial of the Generals =

Trial of the Generals, Trial of generals or generals' trial may refer to:

- Case of the Trotskyist Anti-Soviet Military Organization, show trial in the Soviet Union, 1937
- High Command Trial, post-World War II trial for war crimes, 1947-1948
- Trial of the Generals (Hungary), show trial in Communist Hungary, 1950
- Trial of the Generals (Poland), show trial in Communist Poland, 1951
