= Lajos Tóth =

Lajos Tóth may refer to:

- Lajos Tóth (fighter pilot) (1922–1951), Hungarian fighter pilot
- Lajos Tóth (gymnast) (1914–1984), Hungarian gymnast
