= Júlia Rajk =

Hungarian politician (1914–1981)

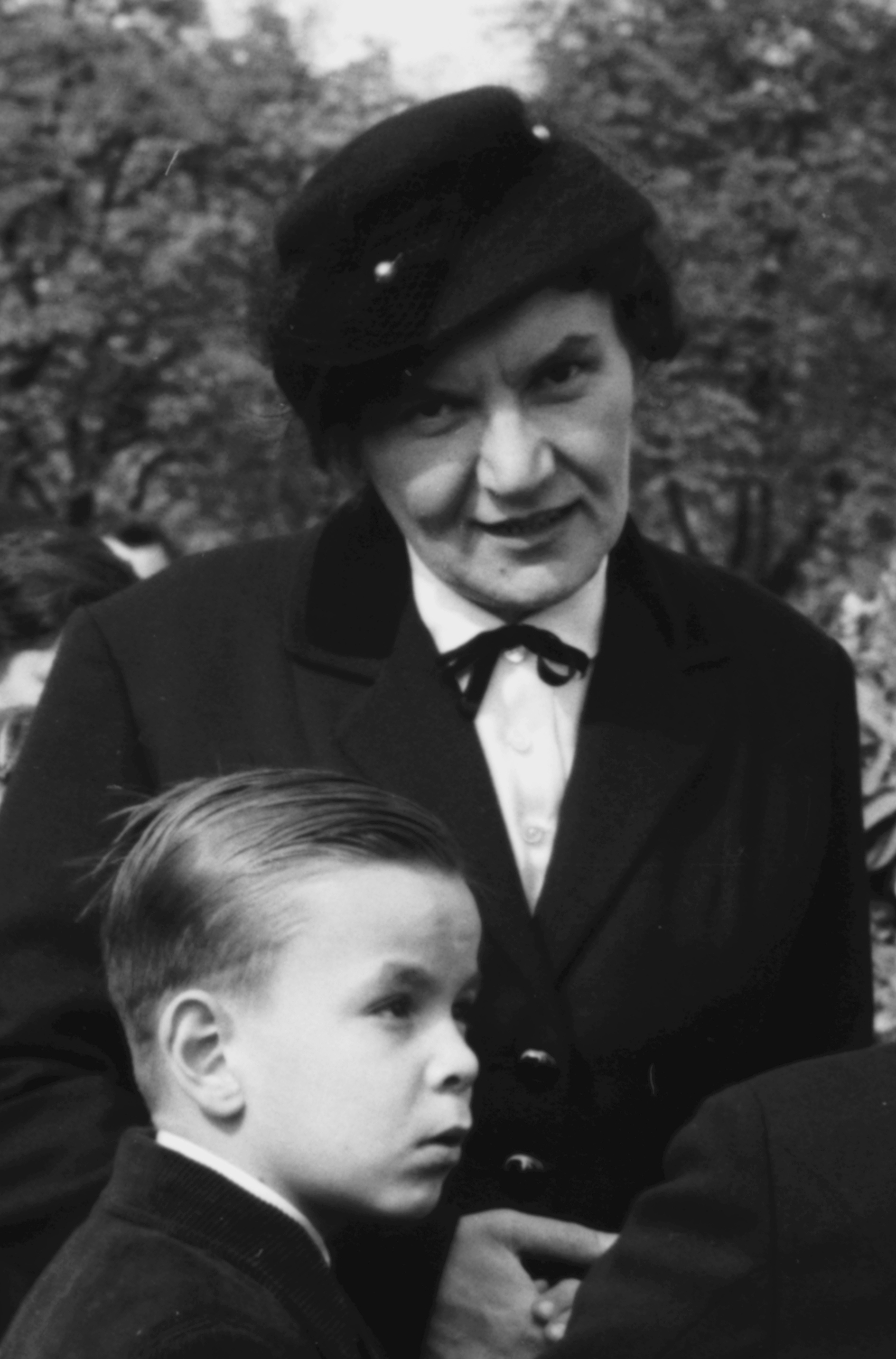
- Born: Földi Júlia; 9 February 1914; Budapest
- Died: 6 September 1981; Budapest
- Resting place: Fiume Road Graveyard
- Occupation: Political activist
- Employer: Metropolitan Ervin Szabó Library (1955–)
- Political party: Communist Party of Hungary, Hungarian Communist Party, Hungarian Working People's Party
- Spouse: László Rajk

Júlia Rajk (born Júlia Földi 9 February 1914 — 6 September 1981) was a Hungarian politician. She was married to László Rajk and after he was executed in 1949, she worked to have him rehabilitated and to preserve the legacies of opponents to the communist Hungarian regime.

== Biography ==
Júlia Földi was born in Budapest in 1914 to a family of Communist workers. During the 1930s, she lived in Paris and took part in the work of the International Red Aid. Földi returned to Hungary at the beginning of the Second World War. She met László Rajk as he was imprisoned in Budapest in 1941 and she served as courier between him and the then-clandestine Hungarian Communist Party. They married in 1946. From that date, she worked as a director of the Democratic Alliance of Hungarian women (MNDSZ). In June 1949, László Rajk, then serving as foreign minister, was arrested by the regime of Prime Minister Mátyás Rákosi and Interior Ministre János Kádár on charges of Titoisme.

Júlia Rajk was arrested at the same time and sentenced to five year imprisonment in March 1950. Their son László, then only five month old, was taken to an orphanage, probably the Lóczy Institute, under the assumed name "István Kóvács" (the most common name in Hungary), and later adopted by Júlia's sister's family under the name of "István Györk".

At her liberation in June 1954, she received identity documents with the name Györk, as the regime aimed at erasing the name Rajk. The following month, she went into an appeal court, where the documentation and archives of her trial proved to be missing; the missing documents had to be reconstituted as far as possible yielding her acquittal in July 1955 for a lack of evidence and her rehabilitation. Reacquainting herself with her contacts within the Communist Party, she managed to have her membership restored in August 1955. Meanwhile, the new administration at the Interior Ministry launched an inquiry into Rajk's trial; amongst the new elements taken into account were Júlia Rajk's activities and her informal communications with her networks, which jeopardised Rákosi's official version. Júlia Rajk testified during the revision of the trial as "Mrs László Györk", but made every effort to sign her testimonies with her married name. In November 1955, László Rajk was acquitted of a number of charges, but remained under suspicion. Dissatisfied with the outcome, Rajk requested an audience with the Central Committee of the Communist Party and obtained a meeting in early December, of which no written notes remain.

As part of her work to rehabilitate her husband, and in order to obtain a public inhumation ceremony, she gave a speech on 18 June 1956 at the Petöfi Circle, a reformist-leaning organisation. When the rehabilitation committee granted her a financial compensation, she donated the funds to the popular universities, then about to reopen in Hungary. On 27 September, she received the news that the body or her husband had been found, along with those of three other victims, and would be buried, after identification, in a ceremony restricted to the Party on 1 October. After tense negotiations with the authorities, where she threatened to boycott any ceremony closed to the public, Júlia Rajk obtained a public ceremony for 5 October with arrangements to allow the workers to witness the event.

On 6 October 1956, László Rajk was buried at Kerepesi Cemetery in Budapest. Júlia Rajk attended, as well as Imre Nagy, leading a 300,000 person march. The event was a prelude to the Hungarian Revolution of 1956 which started at the end of that same month. Rajk was in Berlin at the start of the events, and only returned to Budapest on 2 November. Imre Nagy chose her for new Information Minister Géza Losonczy's team. As the Soviet Army occupied the city on 4 November, Júlia Rajk sought shelter at the Yugoslav Embassy, along with her son, and requested political asylum; she was brought to Snagov, in Romania, with other members of Nagy's team. She was freed in 1958. From then she worked at rehabilitating Imre Nagy, took part in the first NGO to be authorised in Hungary since 1951 (a dog shelter), and promoted access to abortion.

Besides her activism, she worked at the national archives of Hungary until she retired. She died of cancer in Budapest in 1981.

== Posterity ==
Hungarian historian Andrea Petö published a monograph and several research articles based on interviews of Júlia Rajk's son and part of her archives, as well as journal sources of the era.
