= Stanisław Zarakowski =

Polish military prosecutor

- Colonel Stanisław Zarakowski

Personal details
- Born: 7 November 1907 Svolna, the Vicebsk government, Dryssa county Russian Empire
- Died: 11 April 1998 (aged 90) Warsaw, Poland
- Citizenship: Polish

Military service
- Allegiance: Polish People's Army
- Branch/service: Chief Military Prosecutor Office
- Rank: Brigadier general (Revoked); Private

General Stanisław Zarakowski (7 November 1907 – 11 April 1998) was a chief military prosecutor in the People's Republic of Poland who was famous for his role in several trials of Polish Underground State officers which resulted in many death sentences.

Zarakowski was born to a local landowner in Svolna village (Belarusian: Свольна) in Vilna Governorate (Russian Empire, present-day Belarus). His family's estate was nationalized during the Bolshevik revolution when he was ten years old. They moved to Vilnius, where Zarakowski graduated from the law faculty of the Wilno University (then in the Second Polish Republic). During World War II he fled to the Soviet Union and arrived back in war-torn Poland with the Soviet-sponsored Polish People's Army. A hardline Stalinist, Zarakowski was assigned a job with the Chief Military Prosecutor Office and quickly rose to become the Chief Military Prosecutor of the People's Republic of Poland.

== Stalinist reign of terror ==
Zarakowski was the main prosecutor in various Stalinist trials including the infamous Trial of the Generals in 1951 against commanders of the Armia Krajowa including General Stanisław Tatar. The trial resulted in over 20 death sentences against high-ranking officers (later classified as court murders by the Institute of National Remembrance). Zarakowski conducted the trial of Kazimierz Pużak and other politicians of the Polish People's Party (PSL) shortly before the so-called people's referendum of 1946, as well as the Stalinist show trial of the Roman Curia of Kraków. The pronounced death sentences were not enforced although Father Fudali died in unexplained circumstances. Throughout the 1950s the Ministry of Public Security with Dir. Julia Brystiger (née Prajs) at the helm of the 5th Department, incarcerated and routinely tortured Roman Catholic priests investigated for "treason". Before 1953 already, 37 of them were killed including 54 monks.

Zarakowski was a Communist party advisor to MON along with General Roman Romkowski (Natan Grinszpan-Kikiel from Moscow) and a few other officials. He was also the man to order the presiding judge to sentence Capt. Witold Pilecki, the "hero of Auschwitz" to the death penalty, according to IPN institute. Zarakowski was fired from his government job in 1956 during the Polish October revolution and his surviving victims were released.

== Promotions ==
- (Second Lieutenant) – 1935
- Porucznik (Lieutenant) – October 1945
- Kapitan (Captain) – December 1945
- Major (Major) – May 1946
- (Lieutenant colonel) – December 1946
- Pułkownik (Colonel) – July 1947
- Generał brygady (Brigadier general) – October 1953
- Szeregowy (Private) - degradation in 1991

== Awards and decorations ==
- Order of the Banner of Labour, 2nd Class (1949)
- Knight's Cross of Order of Polonia Restituta (1946)
- Cross of Valour, twice (1945)
- Silver Cross of Merit (1946)
- Medal for Oder, Neisse and Baltic (1946)
- Medal of the Armed Forces in the Service of the Fatherland (1955)
- Czechoslovak War Cross 1939–1945 (Czechoslovakia, 1949)
- Medal "For the Victory over Germany in the Great Patriotic War 1941–1945" (USSR)

== Notes and references ==
- Krzysztof Szwagrzyk, Prawnicy czasu bezprawia: sędziowie i prokuratorzy wojskowi w Polsce 1944-1956, Kraków, Wrocław 2005, Instytut Pamięci Narodowej – Komisja Ścigania Zbrodni przeciwko Narodowi Polskiemu, Towarzystwo Naukowe Societas Vistulana, ISBN 83-88385-65-8
