= László Rajk Jr. =

Hungarian architect and politician (1949–2019)

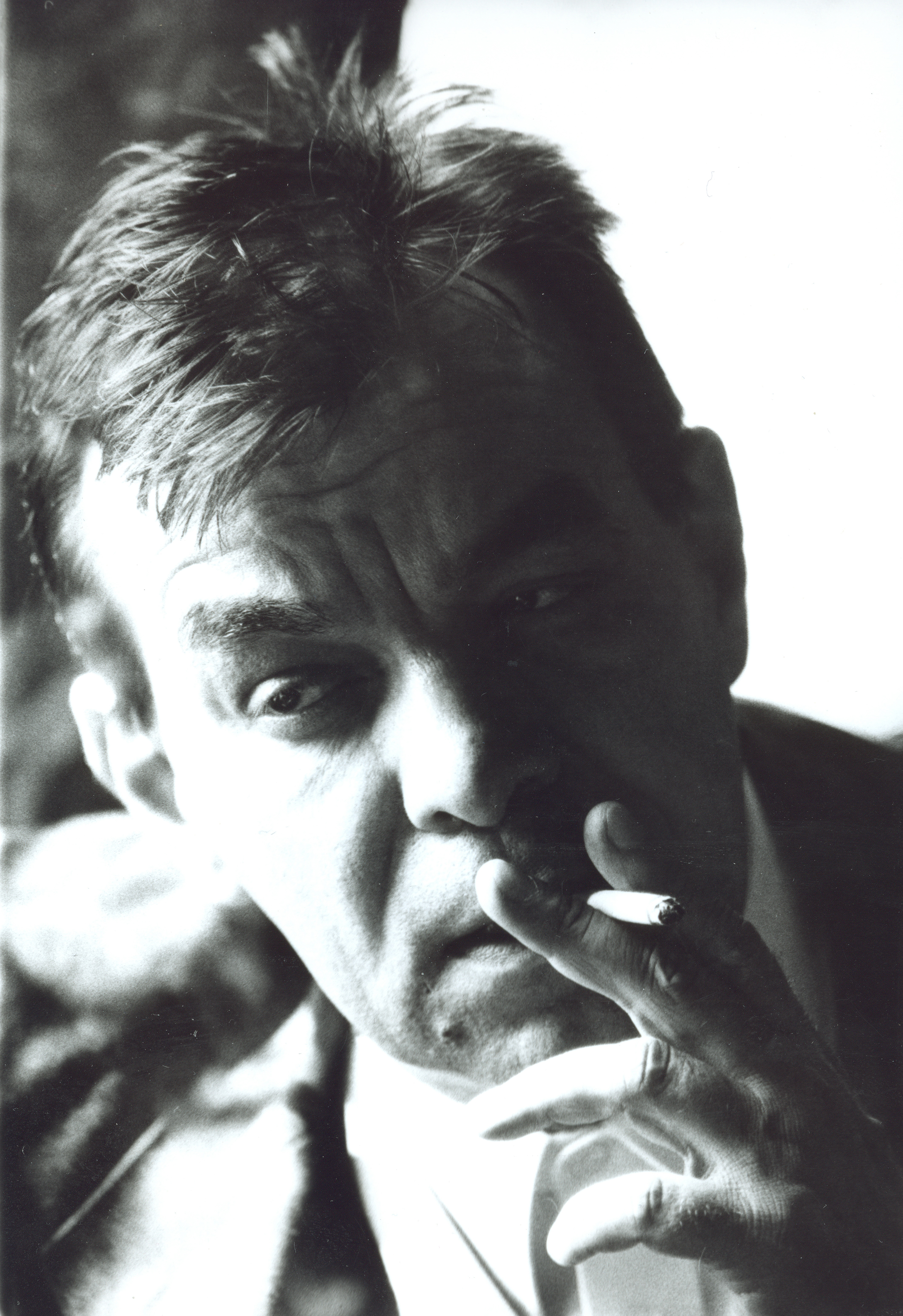
- Rajk in 2009

Member of the National Assembly
- In office 28 June 1994 – 15 October 1996
- In office 2 May 1990 – 27 June 1994
- Constituency: Budapest’s 20th

Personal details
- Born: 26 January 1949 Budapest, Hungary
- Died: 11 September 2019 (aged 70)
- Party: Alliance of Free Democrats
- Spouse: Judit Rajk (m. 1991)
- Parent: László Rajk (father)
- Occupation: Architect; designer; politician; political activist
- Awards: Ordre national du Mérite (1999)

László Rajk Jr. (26 January 1949 – 11 September 2019) was a Hungarian architect, designer and political activist.

== Early life ==
László Rajk Jr. was born on 26 January 1949 in Budapest.

He was the son of the show trial victim, Hungary's foreign minister László Rajk.

== Career and political activism ==
As an architect, he became the member of the Hungarian avantgarde movement. From 1975, he joined the Democratic Opposition, the underground political movement in Hungary, therefore from 1980 he was blacklisted, and was not allowed to work under his own name.

In 1981, with Gábor Demszky (Mayor of Budapest from 1990) he founded the independent, underground AB Publishing House, and ran an illegal bookstore from his apartment called "Samizdat Boutique".

In 1988, he was one of the founders of the Network of Free Initiatives and the liberal party, the Alliance of Free Democrats.

He served as a member of the Hungarian National Assembly, first as MP for Budapest's 20th constituency from 2 May 1990 to 27 June 1994 and later as an MP elected from the national list from 28 June 1994 to 15 October 1996.

Recently he worked as an architect and a production designer for films and taught film architecture at the Hungarian Film Academy in Budapest.

== Personal life ==
He married Judit Rajk in 1991.

== Awards ==
He was a Chevalier in the Ordre national du Mérite, 1999, France.

== Works ==
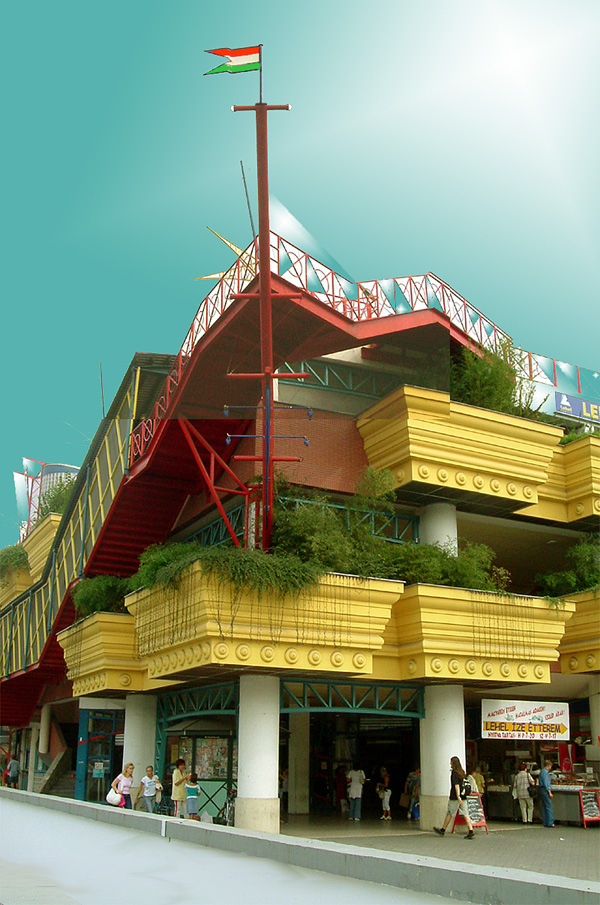
Lehel Market in Budapest

=== Buildings ===
- 1981 KÉV Siófok factory building
- 1984 Studio space at Mihály Károlyi institute Vence headquarters (with Gábor Bachman and Bálint Nagy)
- 1989 Imre Nagy and martyrs of 1956 installation for new cemetery (with Gabor Bachman)
- 1995 Budapest Studio K Theatre interior work
- 1996 interior reconstruction of Budapest Corvin cinema
- 1998 reconstruction of Viennese Collegium Hungaricum (with János Balázs & Írisz Borsos)
- 1999 Aquincum Museum directorate and restoration centre
- 1999 reconstruction of Budapest Moulin Rouge
- 2002 Lehel Csarnok hall
- 2004 reconstruction and Hungarian exhibition in cell block 18 at Auschwitz-Birkenau museum
- 2004 reconstruction of Budapest classicist building
- 2004 restoration workshops and research centre at Aquincum Museum
- 2006 Veszprém 1956 memorial park and monument
- 2006 Studio K theatre - new theatre interior
- 2007 Aquincum museum new building

=== Film sets ===
Over 25 years' experience in building filmsets for international and Hungarian films and documentaries including:

- 2015 Laszlo Nemes: "Son of Saul"
- 2006 Mikael Salomon: The Company
- 2002 Roger Young: Dracula
- 2000 Giles Foster: Prince and the Pauper
- 2000 Gothár Péter: A leghidegebb éjszaka
- 1998 Joseph Sargent: Crime and Punishment
- 1997 John Irvin: When Trumpets Fade
- 1992 Tony Gatlif: Latcho Drom
- 1989 Costa Gavras: Music Box
- 1988 Walter Hill: Red Heat
- 1988 Rick King: Forced March
- 1987 Sándor Pál: Miss Arizona (with Gabor Bachman)

== Sources ==
- "HUNGARY archives -- November 1999 (#18)".
- Kofahajó
