= László Rajk =

Hungarian politician (1909–1949)

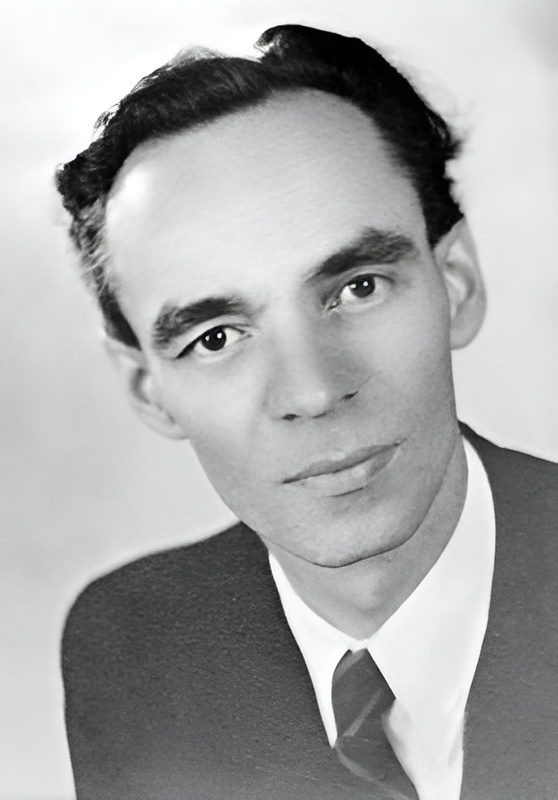
- Rajk in 1948

Minister of Foreign Affairs
- In office 5 August 1948 – 11 June 1949
- Prime Minister: Lajos Dinnyés István Dobi
- Preceded by: Erik Molnár
- Succeeded by: Gyula Kállai

Minister of the Interior
- In office 20 March 1946 – 5 August 1948
- Prime Minister: Ferenc Nagy Lajos Dinnyés
- Preceded by: Imre Nagy
- Succeeded by: János Kádár

Member of the High National Council
- In office 7 December 1945 – 1 February 1946 Serving with Zoltán Tildy, Ferenc Nagy, and Béla Varga (to 8 January 1946)
- Preceded by: Béla Miklós Béla Zsedényi Mátyás Rákosi
- Succeeded by: Zoltán Tildy (as President of the Republic)

Personal details
- Born: 8 March 1909 Székelyudvarhely, Udvarhely County, Kingdom of Hungary, Austria-Hungary (now Romania)
- Died: 15 October 1949 (aged 40) Budapest, People's Republic of Hungary
- Party: KMP, MKP, MDP
- Spouse: Júlia Földi
- Children: László Jr.
- Occupation: Politician

László Rajk (8 March 1909 – 15 October 1949) was a Hungarian Communist politician, who served as Minister of Interior and Minister of Foreign Affairs. He was an important organizer of the Hungarian Communists' power (for example, organizing the State Protection Authority (ÁVH)), but he eventually fell victim to Mátyás Rákosi's show trials.

== Background and career ==
Born in Székelyudvarhely, the ninth of eleven children in a family of Transylvanian Saxons, his ties to Communism began at an early age when he became a member of the Communist Party of Hungary (KMP).

Later he was expelled from his university for his political ideas and would become a building worker, until 1936 when he joined the Popular Front in the Spanish Civil War. He became commissar of the Rakosi Battalion of XIII International Brigade. After the collapse of Republican Spain, he was interned in France until 1941, when he was finally able to return to Hungary, where he became Secretary of the Communist Party Central Committee, an underground Communist movement.

In December 1944 he was arrested by a detachment of the Arrow Cross Party. He was to be executed, and was transported to the prison of Sopronkőhida, then into Germany; but the intercession of his elder brother, Endre, a fascist under-secretary, saved his life. László Rajk was released on 13 May 1945.

He went home to Hungary and took part in party politics. He became a member of all the leader corporations of the party (MKP) and the Extemporal Parliament. Rajk was a member of the High National Council from 7 December 1945 to 2 February 1946. On 20 March 1946 he was appointed minister of the Interior. In this post he organized the Hungarian Communist Party's private army and secret police (an organization analogous to the KGB, Securitate, Stasi and so on), the ÁVH (originally ÁVO), and he became directly responsible for this. Under the cover of "struggle against fascism and reaction" and "defence of the power of proletariat", he prohibited and liquidated several religious, nationalist, and maverick establishments and groups (the number of these was about 1,500), and set up the first show trials.

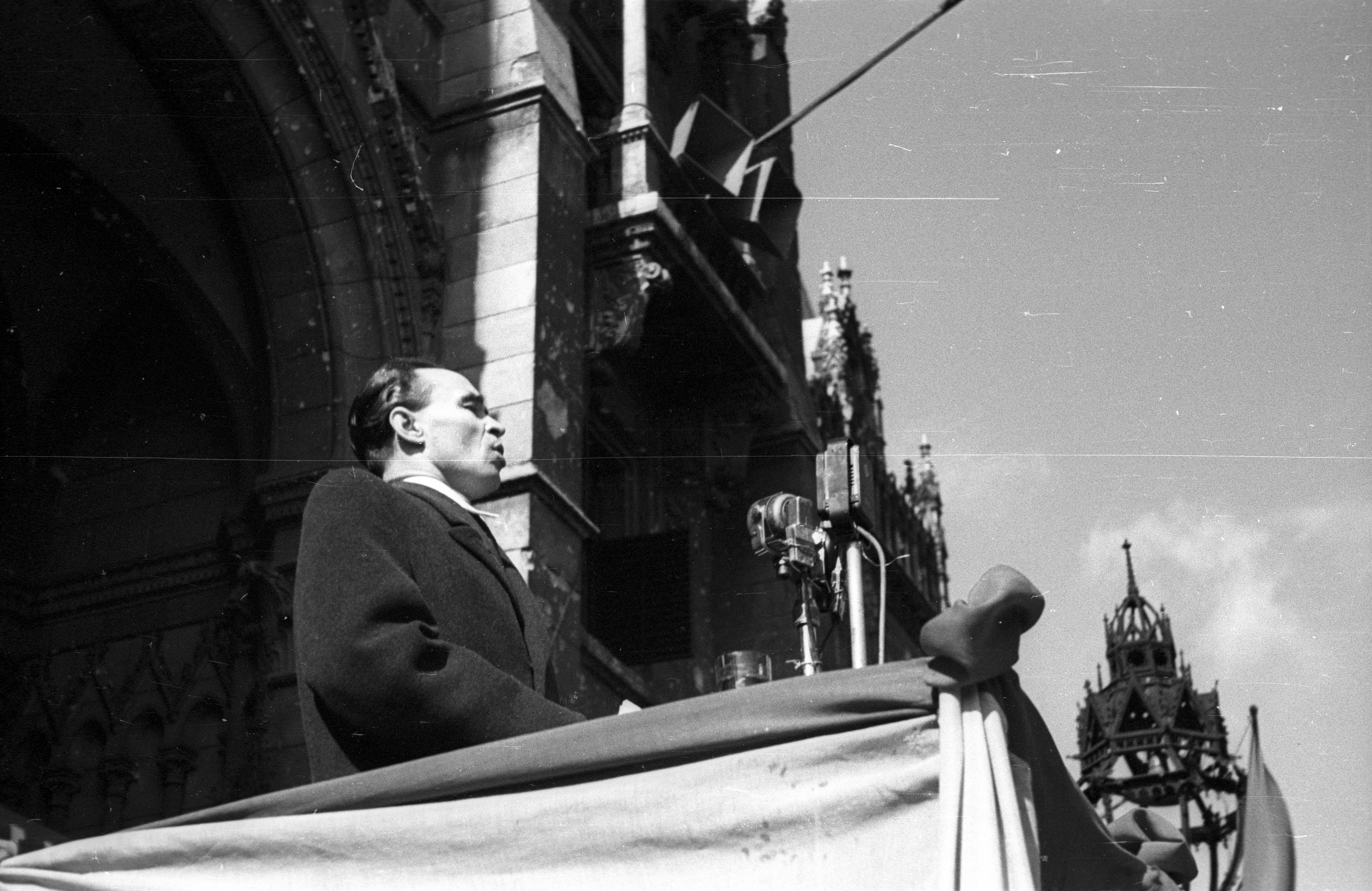
Rajk speaking at the podium

He was reassigned from the Ministry of the Interior to the Ministry of Foreign Affairs from 5 August 1948 to 30 May 1949. Rákosi, who saw Rajk as a threat to his power, decided to accuse him on false charges and had him arrested on 30 May 1949 on trumped-up charges. Rajk, who was popular among the Communists before, soon became the "chained dog" of Tito, Horthy and "the imperialist".

== Trial ==
László Rajk was accused of being a "Titoist Spy", an agent for western imperialism and one who planned on restoring capitalism and jeopardizing Hungary's independence. During his time in prison, Rajk was tortured and was promised acquittal if he took responsibility for the charges brought against him. Stalin's NKVD emissary coordinated with Hungarian General Secretary Mátyás Rákosi and his ÁVH to orchestrate Rajk's show trial.

At his trial, held between 16 and 24 September 1949, in the large assembly hall of the headquarters of the Metal and Engineering Workers' Trade Union in Budapest, he confessed to all the charges brought against him. After his confession the prosecution decided, against the promise made, to call for the heaviest sentences to be brought down upon him and the other seven men who stood trial with him. Rajk was to be made an example for the beginning of Stalin's anti-Titoist purges. Rajk, along with Drs Tibor Szönyi and András Szalai, was sentenced to death. Rajk was executed on 15 October 1949.

== Post-trial and reburial ==
The Rajk trial marked the beginning of the anti-Titoist drive movement of Stalin. His trial also marked the beginning of the removal of all political parties in Hungary. The purges, however, left the economy in a truly disastrous state whereby a lack of capital inflow doomed the building projects that were underway. A vast number of the intelligentsia were then employed on the sort of manual labouring duties usually reserved for skilled professionals. The result left the country with an inadequate infrastructure and unsatisfactorily manufactured goods. The government was also using too many men to search for spies within the country and not enough to perform the productive work to sustain the economy.

Dissatisfaction with Rákosi's rule began to surface. On 28 March 1956, following numerous demonstrations, Rajk was rehabilitated in spite of his responsibility for the excesses of the secret police ÁVH which he had founded in 1946, including initial large purges and executions under his direction. The rehabilitation speech, even though it was not publicized, had vast consequences for Rákosi, who had used the Rajk guilt as an explanation for the other purges that followed. Now that he had to admit that he was, indeed, wrong, it would end up undermining Rákosi's rightful authority. Lászlo Rajk was then reburied, before 100,000 mourners, on 6 October 1956, along with two other men who lost their lives during the purges. (This was a precursor to the Hungarian Revolution of 1956, which began on 23 October.) Júlia Rajk's commitment to rehabilitating her late husband's reputation was instrumental to the large turnout for the funeral.

== List of defendants in the Rajk trial ==
- László Rajk (born in 1909), Minister of Foreign Affairs (executed)
- György Pálffy (1909), Lieutenant General (sentence deferred to military court, executed)
- Lazar Brankov (1912), Counsellor, Yugoslav Legation (life imprisonment)
- Dr Tibor Szönyi (1903), Member of the National Assembly (executed)
- András Szalai, (1917), government official (executed)
- Milan Ognjenovich (1916), government official (9 years)
- Béla Korondy (1914), Police Colonel (sentence deferred to military court, executed)
- Pál Justus (1905), member of the National Assembly (life imprisonment)

15 people were executed and 78 others were sentenced to prison in relation to the Rajk case.

== Play ==
László Rajk: the events of his political and family life, beginning circa 1945, his trial, execution, reburial, atonement, and ending with the Hungarian Revolution of 1956 and the USSR's armed invasion of Hungary, are all portrayed in Robert Ardrey's 1958 play, Shadow of Heroes.

== See also ==
- Júlia Rajk, his wife; political activist
- László Rajk Jr., his son; architect and political activist
- Milada Horáková
- Rudolf Slánský
- Traicho Kostov
- Slánský trial
- Koçi Xoxe
- Trial of the Generals (Hungary)

== Bibliography ==
- Koltai, Ferenc: László Rajk and his Accomplices before the People's Court, Budapest 1949 (MEK)
- Litvan, Győrgy The Hungarian Revolution of 1956: Reform, Revolt, and Repression 1953–1963, Longman Publishing Group, 1996.
- Rajk, Laszlo, Columbia Encyclopedia, 6th Ed. Columbia University Press, 2001. https://web.archive.org/web/20060509173752/http://www2.bartleby.com/65/ra/Rajk-Las.html (1 December 2005)
- Stokes, Gale (ed.) From Stalinism to Pluralism: a Documentary History of Eastern Europe since 1945, New York and Oxford University Press, 1991.

Political offices
Preceded by Imre Nagy	Minister of the Interior; 1946–1948	Succeeded by János Kádár
Preceded by Erik Molnár	Minister of Foreign Affairs; 1948–1949	Succeeded by Gyula Kállai
