= Trial of the Generals (Poland) =

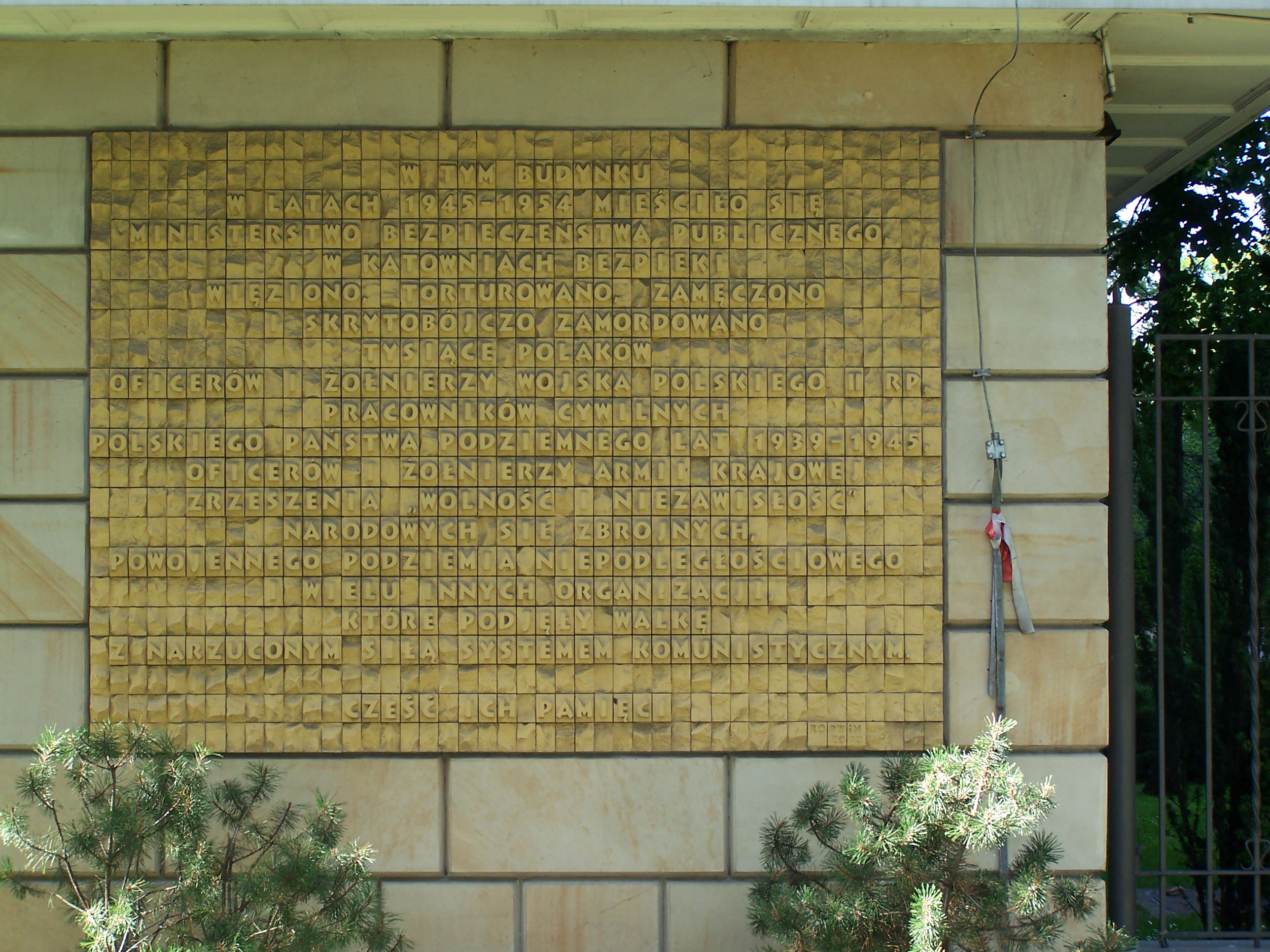
Memorial plaque to the victims of communism on the building where the Ministry of Public Security was located in Warsaw

The Trial of the Generals (Polish: proces generałów) was a totalitarian show trial organized by the communist authorities of the Government of the Polish People's Republic, (Today Poland), between July 31 and August 31, 1951. Its purpose was to cleanse the new pro-Soviet Polish Army of officers who had served in the armed forces of the interwar Poland or in the anti-Nazi resistance during World War II. The trial was used by the authorities in the political struggle for power within the new communist administration, and against Marshal of Poland Michał Rola-Żymierski as well as Generals Marian Spychalski and Wacław Komar, whose political faction had fallen out of grace. The trial was led by the Stalinist Colonel Stanisław Zarakowski.

All of the arrested officers were falsely accused of conspiracy against the Polish United Workers' Party and collaboration with British and American intelligence services. The following so-called TUN court case – an acronym for the names of three most notable participants: Tatar-Utnik-Nowicki, was launched in 1951 against the custodians of the Fund of National Defense (FON) secretly stolen by Jakub Berman's security forces in 1947.

All of the accused generals were sentenced to life imprisonment, including Franciszek Herman, Jerzy Kirchmayer, Stefan Mossor and Stanisław Tatar. The colonels Marian Jurecki, Marian Utnik and Stanisław Nowicki were sentenced to 15 years in prison, while Major Roman and Commander Wacek were sentenced to 12 years. In the so-called "splinter trials", an additional 86 officers of the Polish Army, Navy and Air Forces were arrested and tried. Most of them were tortured by the secret police (Urząd Bezpieczeństwa) under Roman Romkowski. Around 40 indicted officers were condemned to death. Only the first 20 executions were carried out (see also: 1951 Mokotów Prison execution).

In 1956, after the end of Stalinism in Poland, all of the imprisoned were set free, and rehabilitated soon afterwards during the Polish October, except for Gen. Herman who was killed in prison. It was not until 1990 before War of Laws that all wrongfully accused were fully rehabilitated (except for General Mossor).

== See also ==
- Stefan Michnik
- Trial of the Sixteen
- Struggle Session, China
