= Chief Military Prosecutor Office =

Chief Military Prosecutor Office (Polish: Naczelna Prokuratura Wojskowa) - the highest organizational unit of the military part of the prosecutor's office in Poland in the hierarchy, existing until April 4, 2016. The last deputy of the Military Prosecutor's Office was Colonel Tadeusz Cieśla.

== List of Military Prosecutors ==
1. Second Polish Republic - In 1919, by the decree of the Chief of State, the structures of the military prosecutor's office were created. The Supreme Military Prosecutor's Office and the superior of the prosecutors of the Supreme Military Prosecutor's Office and prosecutors of other military organizational units of the prosecutor's office became the Chief Military Prosecutor.

Chief military prosecutor	Period of office
Aleksander Pik	??.01.1919 – ??.04.1924
Edward Gruber	??.04.1924 – ??.05.1926
Józef Daniec	??.05.1926 – ??.12.1932
Teofil Maresch	??.01.1933 – ??.09.1939
Stanisław Szurlej	??.12.1943 – ??.06.1944
Kazimierz Słowikowski	??.07.1944 – ??.06.1945
Jerzy Węsierski	??.07.1945 – ??.09.1946

2. Polish People's Republic - In 1967, the Military Prosecutor's Office was subordinated to the Prosecutor General. Thus, the Chief Military Prosecutor became the Deputy Public Prosecutor General, and the Public Prosecutor General became the supreme body of the entire prosecutor's office.

Chief military prosecutor	Period of office
Jan Mastalerz	02.09.1944 – ??.01.1946
Henryk Holder	21.03.1946 – ??.10.1948
Antoni Skulbaszewski	??.10.1948 – 30.06.1950
Stanisław Zarakowski	02.07.1950 – ??.04.1956
Marian Ryba	??.02.1957 – ??.07.1968
Lucjan Czubiński	01.08.1968 – 25.03.1972
Kazimierz Lipiński	25.03.1972 – 08.04.1975
Józef Szewczyk	08.04.1975 – ??.04.1984
Henryk Kostrzewa	??.04.1984 – ??.03.1990

3. Poland - The Chief Military Prosecutor was the highest authority in the military part of the prosecutor's office after the Public Prosecutor General, and at the same time a deputy of the Public Prosecutor General. He was the superior of the prosecutors of the Supreme Military Prosecutor's Office and other prosecutors of military organizational units of the prosecutor's office.

Chief military prosecutor	Period of office
Ryszard Michałowski	04.1984 – 03.1990
Janusz Palus	01.08.1990 – 05.12.2001
Wojciech Petkowicz	05.12.2001 – 31.03.2005
Tomasz Chrabski	15.08.2005 – 12.06.2006
Tomasz Szałek	12.06.2006 – 14.05.2007
Zbigniew Woźniak	15.05.2007 – 03.12.2007
Krzysztof Parulski	20.02.2008 – 03.02.2012
Jerzy Artymiak	03.02.2012 – 29.02.2016
Tadeusz Cieśla	from 1.03.2016 – 04.04.2016
