= Lajos Tóth (fighter pilot) =

Hungarian fighter ace

- Born: 25 August 1922; Újfehértó, Kingdom of Hungary
- Died: 11 June 1951 (aged 28); Budapest, Hungary
- Military career
- Allegiance: Kingdom of Hungary
- Branch: Royal Hungarian Air Force; Hungarian People's Army Air Force (Magyar Néphadsereg Honi Légiereje)
- Service years: 1940 – 1945; 1948 – 1951
- Rank: Captain
- Nickname: Drumi
- Units: 5/2. Fighter Squadron (vadászrepülő század); 101. Puma vadászrepülő osztály (101st Home Air Defence Fighter Wing)
- Conflicts: World War II; Eastern Front; Defense of Hungary

Lieutenant Lajos Tóth (25 August 1922 – 11 June 1951), nicknamed Drumi, was one of the most successful fighter pilots of the Royal Hungarian Air Force in the Second World War. He scored 24 aerial victories against the Soviet Air Force and an additional four against the United States Air Force for a total of 28 confirmed kills. After the war he voluntarily repatriated from exile in the United States to serve in the aerial combat arm of the Hungarian People's Army but was ultimately arrested and executed in one of the "salami" show trials in 1951.

== Early life ==
Lajos Tóth was born in 1922 in Újfehértó. After completing his secondary school studies in Pécs, he enrolled as a cadet at the air force division of the Ludovica Academy in 1940 where he was quickly recognised for his ability to fly. He graduated from the academy as valedictorian and was subsequently commissioned as a second lieutenant at a Hungarian air force base in Kassa where he was selected to become a fighter pilot in 1942. He shot down his first aircraft, a Soviet La-5, on 5 September 1943. Having been overwhelmed in a dogfight the following month, Tóth was shot down by a Soviet fighter on 3 October 1943 over enemy territory in Ukraine. Despite his wounds, he swam across the Dnieper River where he was wounded a second time by a Red Army machine gunner on patrol before reaching German lines five days later. His record on the Eastern Front was 95 (possibly 93) sorties and nine kills.

== Puma Group ==
After recuperating from his wounds in Budapest, he was assigned to the 101st Home Air Defence Fighter Wing (101. Honi Légvédelmi Vadászrepülő Osztály) on 1 May 1944 as the commanding officer of the Radish (Ratek) Fighter Squadron where he successfully downed four American aircraft despite having been shot down an additional two times. As the Hungarian government came to approach a level of detente under the guidance of Miklós Horthy, Tóth's energy was again focused on combatting intrusions by the increasingly aggressive Soviet Air Force during Operation Panzerfaust. In 1945 he accrued 13 kills and was promoted to first lieutenant. His final two victories of the war were the neutralisation of two Il-2 aircraft on 14 April 1945 while over Austria. He completed a total of 181 sorties during his time in service.

== Post-war life and death ==
After the conclusion of hostilities, Tóth surrendered to soldiers of the United States Army in West Germany where he was held as a respected prisoner of war. He immigrated to the United States in 1946 after it became apparent that Hungary would fall under the control of the Warsaw Pact. He subsequently returned to Hungary under a general amnesty in 1948 and was re-commissioned as a captain in the Hungarian People's Army. On 3 March 1951, the State Protection Authority arrested Tóth on false charges of conspiracy to foment an anti-communist uprising. He was sentenced to death on 11 June 1951. He was subsequently rehabilitated and posthumously promoted to lieutenant colonel after the collapse of the Soviet Union in 1990.

His remains were found in September 2002 in plot 298 of the New Public Cemetery in Rákoskeresztúr under another name. He was positively identified in 2003 by DNA testing. He was reburied nearby in plot 301 with full military honours.
