= 1953 Show trial of the Kraków Curia =

Show trial in Stalinist Poland

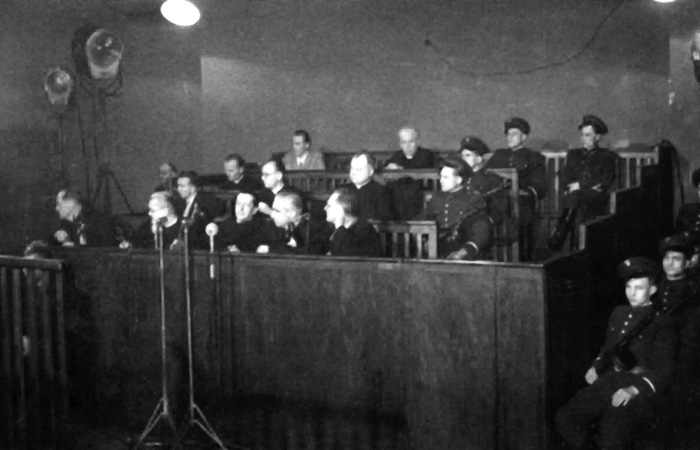
The defendants during the trial in January 1953

The 1953 trial of the Kraków Curia was a public show trial of four Roman Catholic priests and three lay persons of the city's Curia who were accused by the Communist authorities in the People's Republic of Poland of subversion and spying for the United States. The staged trial, based on the Soviet Moscow Trials, was held before the Military District Court of Kraków from 21 to 26 January 1953, at a public-event-hall of the Szadkowski Plant.

The court, headed by Judge Mieczysław Widaj, announced its verdict on 27 January 1953, sentencing to death Józef Lelito, Michał Kowalik, and Edward Chachlica. The priests were stripped of all civil and constitutional rights; but death penalties were never carried out. The remaining defendants were sentenced to sentences ranging from six years in prison to life (Franciszek Szymonek). The judgments were endorsed politically by a resolution of the Polish Writers Union in Kraków on 8 February 1953 that was signed by many prominent members. A series of similar trials followed.

== Stalinist repression of Catholicism ==
The "war against religion" was the responsibility of the Ministry of Public Security of Poland and its 5th Department created in July 1946 specifically for that purpose. In 1950, a total of 123 Roman Catholic priests had been thrown in jail, Since the late 1940s, it had been headed by interrogator Julia Brystiger, who personally directed the operation to arrest and detain the Primate of Poland, Cardinal Stefan Wyszyński. The department specialized in the persecution and torture of Polish religious personalities. Brystygier dedicated herself to an ideological struggle against all forms of religion. Nicknamed Bloody Luna by the victims of her torture techniques, Brystygier was also responsible for the arrest of 2,000 Jehovah's Witnesses for their religious beliefs.

The trial was a key element in the subsequent wave of repressions against the Church. First, on 9 February 1953, the Communist government issued The decree on appointments of clergy to church positions, assuming total control over the way in which positions in the Church were filled. A month later, on 8 March, the authorities stopped publication of the Catholic weekly Tygodnik Powszechny in reprisal for its alleged refusal to include a eulogy commemorating the death of Joseph Stalin. The magazine was taken over—until October 1956—by a pro-government catholic group, the PAX Association. On 14 September, the government apparatus launched a separate show trial of Bishop Czesław Kaczmarek, coupled with a series of the side trials of various "informants" sentenced to an average of 12–15 years. Kaczmarek, tortured in custody before being forced to sign a confession and admit his guilt, was sentenced to 12 years in prison on 22 September. On 25 September, Cardinal Stefan Wyszyński was arrested. Three days later, on 28 September, a Catholic Bishops' Conference issued an official condemnation of sabotage against the state. In parallel, the Office of the Council of Ministers (Urząd Rady Ministrów) organized its own ceremony on 17 December, welcoming the government-approved Bishops, Diocesan administrators (Vicar capitulars), and Suffragans.

=== Splinter trials ===
A wave of propaganda spin-offs called the "splinter trials" was launched against the people associated with the Rada Polityczna (Political Council) in Western Europe, composed of members of the National Party active during World War II. All captives were accused of espionage, and sentenced to long prison terms. Father Józef Fudali, who corresponded with former NOW partisan Jan Szponder, was sentenced by the court to 13 years in prison on 13 May 1953. He died two years later in unexplained circumstances during his detention, probably on 30 January 1955. Helena Budziaszek received 15 years in prison; Adam Kowalik was sentenced to 10 years, while his wife Stanisława (sister of Jan Szponder) received 5 years; Irena Haber was given 12 years. Piotr Kamieniarz received 15 years and his sons Andrzej and Józef received 12 years. Władysław Meus was given 12 years; Mieczysław Steczko got 15 years; and Tadeusz Mirota 12 years. All trials were highly publicised, with daily radio broadcasts, and articles in national newspapers by prominent writers, such as the full-page attack in support of the verdict, by Mrożek, comparing death-row priests to the degenerate SS-men and Ku Klux Klan. Due to wartime annihilation of Warsaw, a large number of Polish writers resided in Kraków in those years.

== Polish Writers' Union resolution ==
The Polish Writers' Union gathering of 8 February 1953, in Kraków, produced a damning statement regarding the Trial of the Curia. The Resolution was signed by 53 members, some of whom went on to become leading figures in Polish literary circles, bestowed with medals and awards.

In recent days, a trial has taken place in Kraków, of a group of American spies associated with the Kraków Metropolitan Curia. We, the members of Kraków branch of the Polish Writers Union, meeting on 8 February 1953, express our absolute condemnation of those traitors to our Homeland, who used their spiritual position and influence to dupe the young, gathered around KSM; and who acted with malice toward the nation and our people's country – and engaged in espionage and subversion – for American money.

We condemn those Church officials of the Catholic hierarchy, who welcomed the anti-Polish machinations, gave their support to the traitors, and went on to destroy our cultural monuments.

Given these facts, we commit ourselves in our own creative work, to even more aggressively and with greater depth than ever, tackle the current problems of our struggle for Socialism, vehemently.

— Resolution of the Union of Polish Writers in Kraków regarding the Kraków trial

The Kraków trial was the culmination of the Stalinist anti-ecclesiastical offensive; on the other hand, it was also the highest point in an attack led by MBP against the Polish emigration circles. In December 1952, two major operations were concluded by the security forces: one against the remnants of the anti-Communist underground ("cursed soldiers"), and the other, against its own political opponents.

== See also ==
- Stalinism in Poland

== Bibliography ==
- Czuchnowski, W. (2003). Blizna. Proces kurii krakowskiej 1953. (in Polish). Wydawnictwo: Znak. ISBN 83-240-0271-5.
- Grajewski, A. (February 17, 2006). "Duchowni i SB". (in Polish). Portal "Wiara.pl".
