= Trial of the Generals (Hungary) =

The Trial of the Generals (Hungarian: Tábornokok pere) was a totalitarian show trial organized by the communist authorities of the Hungarian People's Republic, with hearings held on August 8 and 9, 1950. Of 66 arrested and tried military, police, and civilian persons, 12 were sentenced to death (7 executed) and 6 were sentenced to forced labor. It was also known as the Sólyom trial (Sólyom-per).

During the associated purge in the army, before and after the trial over 12,000 persons were removed from the command.

== Executed persons ==
Seven persons were executed on August 19, 1950:

- László Sólyom
- Kálmán Révay
- István Beleznay
- Gusztáv Merényi
- Major General György Pórffy, commander of the artillery
- Lieutenant General Gusztáv Illy
- Colonel Sándor Lőrincz, chief of the Material Planning Group

== Aftermath ==
There was a retrial in 1954 and the generals were acquitted "due to lack of evidence". After the fall of the Communist regime, in 1990, the accused were acquitted due to lack of crime. During the 1990 retrial it was revealed that the documents related to the 1950 trial were destroyed. Only much later the ranks of the generals were restored: Inj 2007, The Minister of Defence posthumously promoted Lieutenant General László Sólyom and Lieutenant General Gusztáv Illy to Colonel General, Major General István Beleznay, Major General Gusztáv Merényi, Major General György Pórffy and Major General Kálmán Révay to Lieutenant General, and Colonel Sándor Lőrincz to Brigadier General.

== See also ==
- László Rajk, a 1949 Communist Hungarian show trial
