= Show trial =

Public trial in which the guilt or innocence of the defendant is predetermined

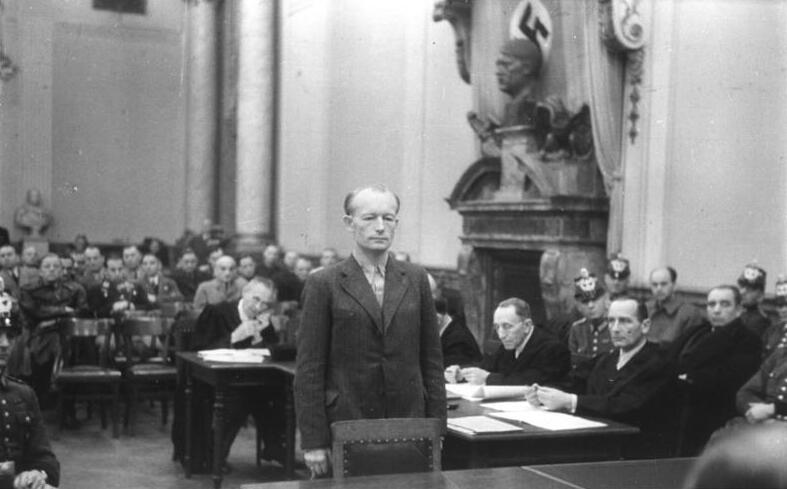
People's Court trial of Adolf Reichwein, Nazi Germany, 1944

A show trial is a public trial in which the guilt or innocence of the defendant has already been determined. It is a type of political trial. The purpose of holding a show trial is to present both accusation and verdict to the public, serving as an example and a warning to other would-be dissidents or transgressors.

Show trials tend to be retributive rather than corrective, and they are also conducted for propagandistic purposes. When aimed at individuals on the basis of protected classes or characteristics, show trials are examples of political persecution.

== Etymology ==
The first known use of the term was in 1928.

== China ==
After the Tiananmen Square protests of 1989, show trials were given to "rioters and counter-revolutionaries" involved in the protests and the subsequent military massacre.

Chinese Nobel Peace Prize laureate Liu Xiaobo was given a show trial in 2009.

== Soviet Union ==
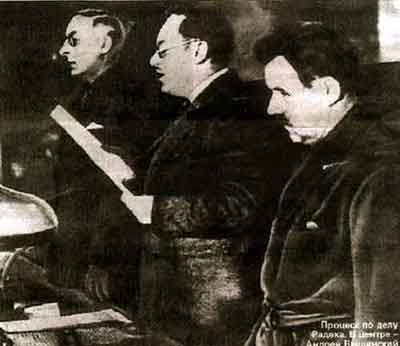
Prosecutor General Andrey Vyshinsky (centre) reading the 1937 indictment against Karl Radek during the 2nd Moscow trial

As early as 1922, Lenin advocated staging several "model trials" ("показательный процесс", literally "a process showing an example") in Soviet Russia and Soviet Ukraine. The Bolsheviks emphasized media coverage of show trials as a mechanism to educate the public about class enemies and political enemies.

Show trials became common during Joseph Stalin's political repressions, such as the Moscow Trials of the Great Purge period (1937–38). Such trials paralleled the institution of self-criticism within Communist Party cadres and Soviet society.

Known show trials in Soviet Ukraine include "Union for the Liberation of Ukraine" trial (1930), "People's Revolutionary Socialist Party" trial (1930), "Ukrainian National Center" trial (1931).

== Russia ==
During its full-scale invasion into Ukraine, around 2,000 Ukrainian soldiers were taken prisoners by Russia in Mariupol in May 2022. In 2023 Russia began criminal prosecutions against members of the Azov Regiment, on the charges of involvement in a terrorist organization and taking part in action to overthrow the Russia-backed authorities in the Donetsk region. Most of the Ukrainians standing trials in Russia are members of Ukrainian Armed Forces, which, according to HRW, makes them prisoners of war with corresponding status and protections per the Geneva Convention on Prisoners of War. According to HRW and Amnesty International, the charges are war crimes and, per HRW, are an excuse to prosecute Ukrainian soldiers for participating in the conflict. Observers called these prosecutions show trials.

The trials and sentences of Evan Gershkovich, Alexei Navalny and others were described as "ominously reminiscent of Soviet tactics".

== Eastern Europe ==
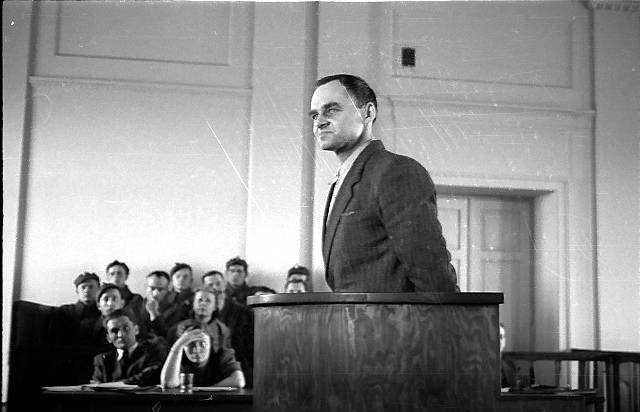
Captain Witold Pilecki, former prisoner at Auschwitz during a show trial conducted by communist authorities in Poland in 1948

Following some dissent within ruling communist parties throughout the Eastern Bloc, especially after the 1948 Tito–Stalin split, several party purges occurred, with several hundred thousand members purged in several countries. In addition to rank-and-file member purges, prominent communists were purged, with some subjected to public show trials. These were more likely to be instigated, and sometimes orchestrated, by the Kremlin or even Stalin himself, as he had done in the earlier Moscow Trials.

Such high-ranking party show trials included those of Koçi Xoxe in Albania and Traicho Kostov in Bulgaria, who were purged and arrested. After Kostov was executed, Bulgarian leaders sent Stalin a telegram thanking him for the help. In Romania, Lucrețiu Pătrășcanu, Ana Pauker and Vasile Luca were arrested, with Pătrășcanu being executed. The Soviets generally directed show trial methods throughout the Eastern Bloc, including a procedure in which confessions and evidence from leading witnesses could be extracted by any means, including threatening to torture the witnesses' wives and children. The higher-ranking the party member, generally the more harsh the torture that was inflicted upon him. For the show trial of Hungarian Interior Minister János Kádár, who one year earlier had attempted to force a confession of László Rajk (and György Pálffy etc. etc.) in his show trial, regarding "Vladimir" the questioner of Kádár:

Vladimir had but one argument: blows. They had begun to beat Kádár. They had smeared his body with mercury to prevent his pores from breathing. He had been writhing on the floor when a newcomer had arrived. The newcomer was Vladimir's father, Mihály Farkas. Kádár was raised from the ground. Vladimir stepped close. Two henchmen pried Kádár's teeth apart, and the colonel, negligently, as if this were the most natural thing in the world, urinated into his mouth.

The evidence was often not just non-existent but absurd, such as Hungarian George Paloczi-Horváth's party interrogators claiming "We knew all the time—we have it here in writing—that you met professor Szentgyörgyi not in Istanbul, but in Constantinople." In another case, the Hungarian ÁVH secret police also condemned another party member as a Nazi accomplice with a document that had been previously displayed in a glass cabinet at the Institute of the Working Class Movement as an example of a Gestapo forgery. The trials themselves were "shows", with each participant having to learn a script and conduct repeated rehearsals before the performance. In the Slánský trial in Czechoslovakia, when the judge skipped one of the scripted questions, the better-rehearsed Slánský answered the one which should have been asked.

=== Yugoslavia ===
In 1946, Draža Mihailović and other prominent figures of the Chetnik movement during World War II were tried for high treason and war crimes committed during WWII. The trial opened in the presence of about 60 foreign journalists. Mihailović and ten others (two in absentia) were sentenced to death by a firing squad; the others were convicted of penalties ranging from 18 months to 20 years in prison. In 2015, a Serbian court invalidated Mihailović's conviction. The court held that it had been a Communist political show trial that was controlled by the government. The court concluded that Mihailović had not received a fair trial. Mihailović was, therefore, fully rehabilitated.

During 1946–1949, several well-publicized show trials were held in the People's Republic of Slovenia. First was the Nagode Trial in which 32 non-communist intellectuals were tried as spies, three of them sentenced to death. Second was a series of so-called Dachau trials in which 37 members of the Communist Party were sentenced, 15 of them to death. In the 1940s, highly publicized show trials were employed against many real or alleged collaborators, and people with pro-Bulgarian views, who were sentenced to death for national treason, in the People's Republic of Macedonia.

=== Hungary ===
==== Show trials during the Horthy-regime 1920-1944 ====
The Rákosi trials refer to the criminal trials held between July 12 and August 4, 1926, and then between January 21 and February 4, 1935. The first trial dealt with the case of communists arrested in September 1925. Following international and domestic protests, the summary trial court, which sat on November 14–16, 1925, ordered the case to be referred to a regular court. The first defendant in the case, Mátyás Rákosi, was sentenced to eight and a half years in prison, the second defendant, Károly Őry, to four years, and the third defendant, Ignác Gőgös, to three and a half years. Rákosi's sentence expired on 24 April 1934, but due to his role during the Hungarian Soviet Republic, he was convicted again in the so-called second Rákosi trial – for crimes of high treason, rebellion, 27 counts of murder as an accomplice, 17 counts of murder as an instigator, and counterfeiting of currency – and was sentenced to life imprisonment. Rákosi's defense attorney in the second trial was Vámbéry Rusztem. Rákosi exchanged for the Hungarian flags of 1848-49 and was extraditied to the USSR.

==== The show trials in Hungary between 1945-48 ====
The show trials of the coalition period between 1945 and 1948 were initiated by the communists who controlled the interior ministry(and secret services). The main goal of these trials was to eliminate the multi-party system: to eliminate right-wing conservative politicians, to crush the very popular Independent Smallholder, Farmer and Citizen Party(Peasant party), and to perfect the "salami slicing tactics". They were primarily directed against certain leaders of the Smallholder Party, and later the Social Democratic Party(who were against to merge into the communist party). At the end of the era, a showdown against church leaders and Christian politicians also began. Although this became characteristic mainly from 1949, there were also showdowns due to rivalry within the communist party (Demény case).

The trials were made possible by the 1946. VII. tc. law on the criminal protection of the democratic state order and the republic, commonly known as the “Hangman Act”. Between 1946 and 1950, almost 6 thousand people were convicted.

These include:

- Plenty of People's Courts in Hungary(post WW2 trial against exnazis and war criminals but not all was criminal but enemies of the communist party)
- Hungarian Community trials
- trials of movements “exposed” in the Ministry of Agriculture
- MAORT trials
- Hungarian Resistance Movement trial in Szeged (1947 / showdown with the right wing in Szeged)
- Pócspetri case trial (1948 / intimidation of the Catholic Church).

==== Trials 1949-1956 ====
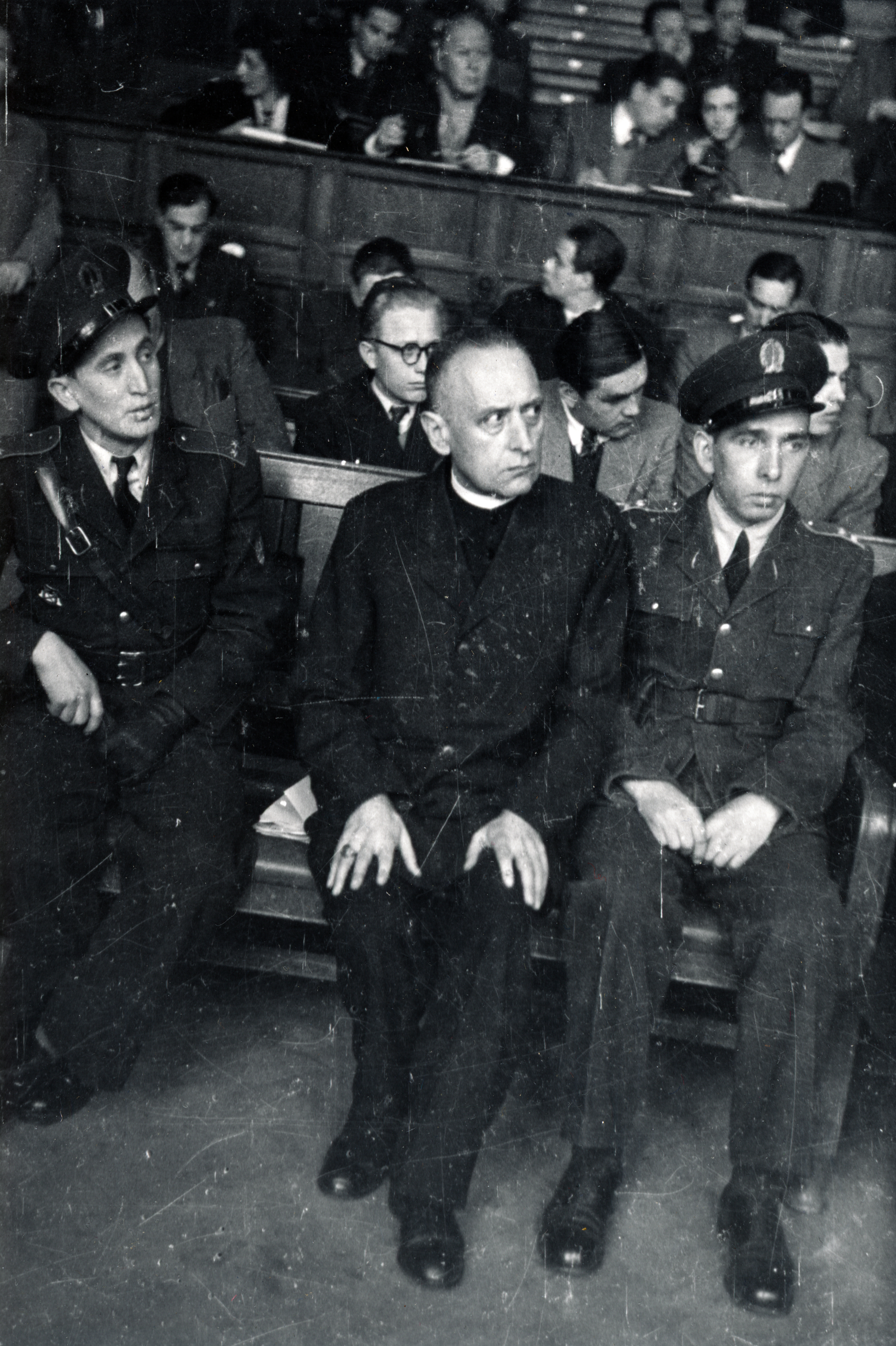
Trial of József Mindszenty

Stalin's NKVD emissary coordinated with Hungarian General Secretary Mátyás Rákosi and his ÁVH head the way the show trial of Hungarian Minister of Interior László Rajk should go, and he was later executed. Trial of the Generals was a totalitarian show trial organized by the communist authorities of the Hungarian People's Republic, with hearings held on August 8 and 9, 1950. 66 arrested and tried from military, police, and civilian persons, 12 were sentenced to death (7 executed) and 6 were sentenced to forced labor. It was also known as the Sólyom trial (Sólyom-per).

==== Trials 1956-1963 ====
The "Nagy Imre per(trial)" was the most famous after the revolution. The trial of Imre Nagy and his associates was a secret concept trial following the 1956 Hungarian Revolution, held between January 28 and June 15, 1958, against the Imre Nagy government and the 'Imre Nagy group'. The defendants were Imre Nagy, Géza Losonczy, Miklós Gimes, Pál Maleter, József Szilágyi, Sándor Kopácsi, Ferenc Donáth, Ferenc Jánosi, Zoltán Tildy and Miklós Vásárhelyi. The trial was decided in continuous consultation between the puppet government led by Kádár and the Soviet leadership.

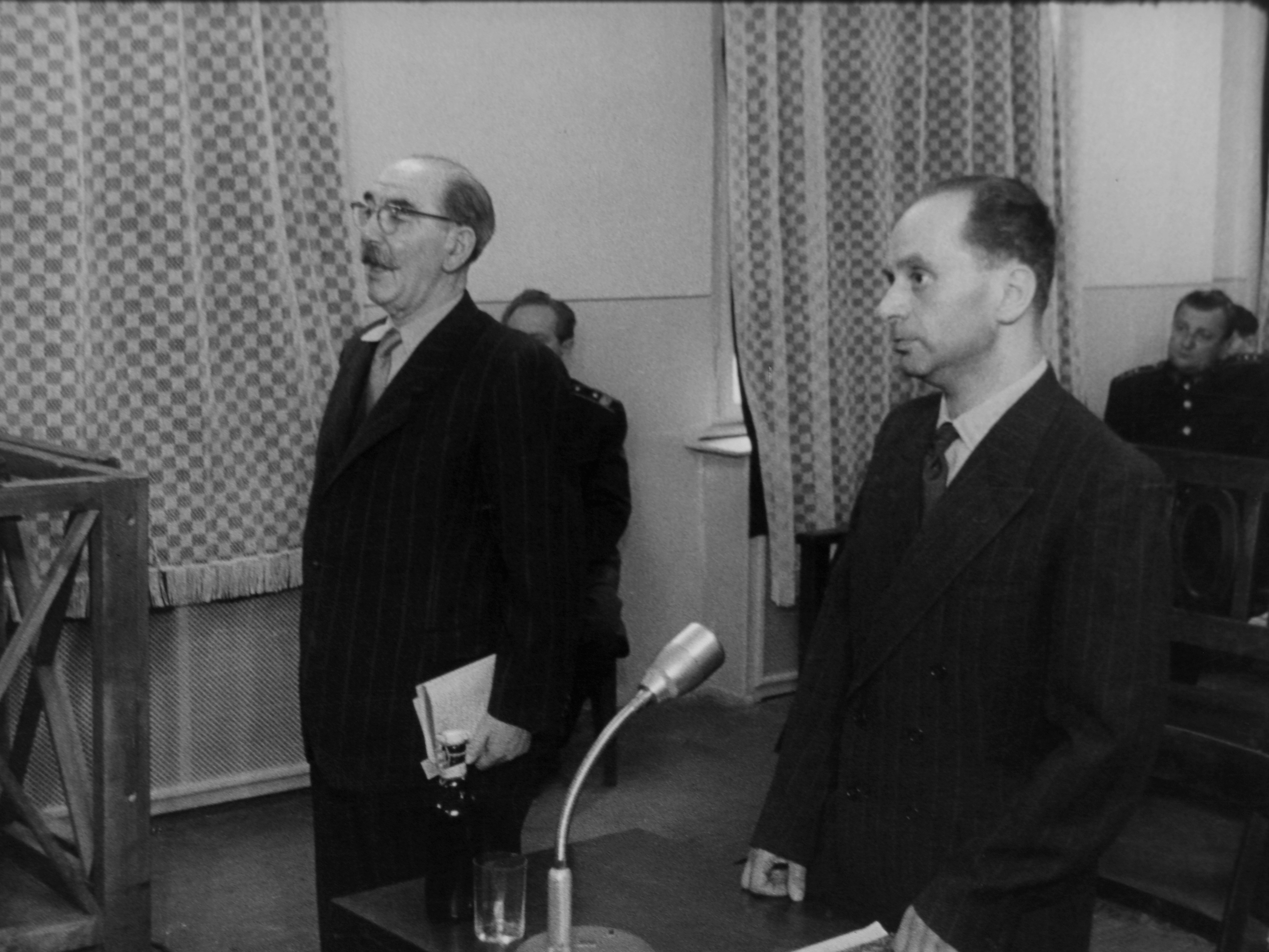
Imre Nagy on trial

During the trial, a series of illegalities were committed, the defense was intimidated, the defense was not allowed to bring witnesses, Vida constantly stifled the defendants, they were not allowed to present their evidence, and in the end, verdicts were made that suited the political purpose.

The verdict was announced on June 15, 1958. Imre Nagy was sentenced to death and complete confiscation of property, Ferenc Donáth to 12 years in prison, Miklós Gimes to death, Zoltán Tildy to 6 years in prison, Pál Maleter to death, Sándor Kopácsi to life imprisonment, Ferenc Jánosi to 8 years, and Miklós Vásárhelyi to 5 years in prison.

The death row convicts were hanged at dawn the next day. The execution was not made public until the next day. Géza Losonczy died in pre-trial detention from forced artificial feeding due to his hunger strike before the trial began. The case of the 9th defendant, József Szilágyi, was separated – because he refused to answer the interrogators’ questions – and he was hanged on April 24, 1958. Their bodies were buried in the prison yard, wired in tar paper. They were exhumed in 1961, and the wired bodies were buried face down in plot 301 of the New Public Cemetery, in an unmarked grave. They were rehabilitated and solemnly reburied in 1989, at the time of the change of regime.

The political leadership filmed the trial for later use in propaganda, but the footage was not suitable for inciting opposition to the revolution, so it was classified, and was only declassified in 2008.

=== Czechoslovakia ===
The Rajk trials in Hungary led Moscow to warn Czechoslovakia's parties that enemy agents had penetrated even high into party ranks, and when a puzzled Rudolf Slánský and Klement Gottwald inquired what they could do, Stalin's NKVD agents arrived to help prepare subsequent trials.

First, these trials focused on people outside the Czechoslovak Communist party. General Heliodor Píka was arrested without a warrant in early May 1948 and accused of espionage and high treason, damaging the interests of the Czechoslovak Republic and the Soviet Union, and undermining the ability of the state to defend itself, Píka was not allowed to present a defence, and no witnesses were called. He was sentenced to death and hanged. During the Prague Spring of 1968, Píka's case was reopened at the request of Milan Píka (son of Heliodor) and the elder Píka's lawyer, and a military tribunal declared Heliodor Píka innocent of all charges.

Milada Horáková, a Czech politician focused on social issues and women's rights, who was jailed during the German occupation for her political activity, was accused of leading a conspiracy to commit treason and espionage at the behest of the United States, Great Britain, France and Yugoslavia. Evidence of the alleged conspiracy included Horáková's presence at a meeting of political figures from the National Socialist, Social Democrat and People's parties, in September 1948, held to discuss their response to the new political situation in Czechoslovakia. She was also accused of maintaining contacts with Czechoslovak political figures in exile in the West. The trial of Horáková and twelve of her colleagues began on 31 May 1950 and the State's prosecutors were led by Dr. Josef Urválek and included Ludmila Brožová-Polednová. The trial proceedings were carefully orchestrated with confessions of guilt secured from the accused, though a recording of the event, discovered in 2005, revealed Horáková's defence of her political ideals. Horáková was sentenced to death, along with three co-defendants (Jan Buchal, Oldřich Pecl, and Záviš Kalandra), on 8 June 1950. Many prominent figures in the West, notably Albert Einstein, Winston Churchill and Eleanor Roosevelt, petitioned for her life, but the sentences were confirmed. She was executed by hanging in Prague's Pankrác Prison on 27 June 1950.

The trials then turned to the communist party itself (Slánský trial). In November 1952 Rudolf Slánský and 13 other high-ranking Communist bureaucrats (Bedřich Geminder, Ludvík Frejka, Josef Frank, Vladimír Clementis, Bedřich Reicin, Karel Šváb, Rudolf Margolius, Otto Šling, André Simone, Artur London, Vavro Hajdů and Evžen Löbl), 10 of whom were Jews, were arrested and charged with being Titoists and Zionists, official USSR rhetoric having turned against Zionism. Party rhetoric asserted that Slánský was spying as part of an international western capitalist conspiracy to undermine socialism and that punishing him would avenge the Nazi murders of Czech communists Jan Šverma and Julius Fučík during World War II. The trial of the 14 national leaders began on 20 November 1952, in the Senate of the State Court, with the prosecutor being Josef Urválek. It lasted eight days. It was notable for its strong anti-Semitic overtones. All were found guilty, with three being sentenced to life imprisonment while the rest were sentenced to death. Slánský was hanged at Pankrác Prison on 3 December 1952. His body was cremated and the ashes were scattered on an icy road outside of Prague.

=== Poland ===
Sixteen prominent leaders of the Polish anti-Nazi underground were brought to trial in Moscow in June 1945. Their removal from the political scene precluded the possibility of a democratic transition called for by the Yalta agreements.

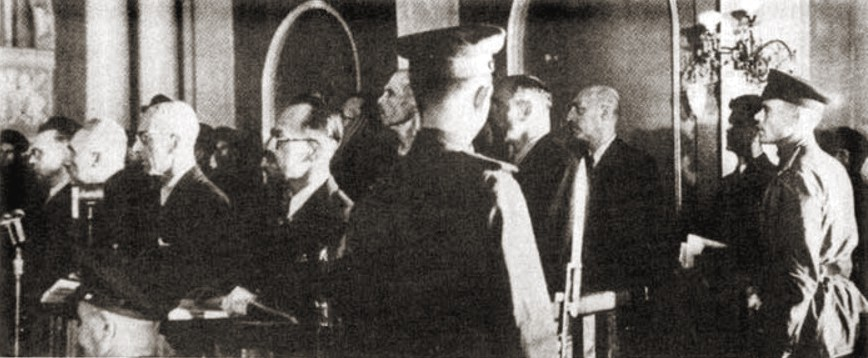
The show trial of 16 leaders of the Polish wartime underground movement (including the Home Army and civil authorities) convicted of "drawing up plans for military action against the U.S.S.R.", Moscow, June 1945. All of them had been invited to help organize the new "Polish Government of National Unity" in March 1945 and were subsequently captured by the NKVD.

The trial of the defendants, falsely and absurdly accused of collaboration with the Nazis, was watched by British and American diplomats without protest. The absence of the expected death sentences was their relief. The exiled government in London, after Mikołajczyk's resignation led by Tomasz Arciszewski, ceased to be officially recognized by Great Britain and the United States on 5 July 1945. The Trial of the Generals(Polish: proces generałów) was a totalitarian show trial organized by the communist authorities of the Government of the Polish People's Republic, (The communist Poland 1945–1989), between July 31 and August 31, 1951. Its purpose was to cleanse the new pro-Soviet Polish Army of officers who had served in the armed forces of the interwar Poland or in the anti-Nazi resistance during World War II. who endangered the communist rule. The trial was used by the authorities in the political struggle for power within the new communist administration, and against Marshal of Poland Michał Rola-Żymierski as well as Generals Marian Spychalski and Wacław Komar, whose political faction had fallen out of grace. The trial was led by the Stalinist Colonel Stanisław Zarakowski.

The 1953 trial of the Kraków Curia was a public show trial of four Roman Catholic priests and three lay persons of the city's Curia who were accused by the Communist authorities in the People's Republic of Poland of subversion and spying for the United States.The staged trial, based on the Soviet Moscow Trials, was held before the Military District Court of Kraków from 21 to 26 January 1953, at a public-event-hall of the Szadkowski Plant.

=== Romania ===
Lucrețiu Pătrășcanu was a Romanian communist politician and leading member of the Communist Party of Romania (PCR), also noted for his activities as a lawyer, sociologist and economist. Pătrășcanu rose to a government position before the end of World War II and, after having disagreed with Stalinist tenets on several occasions, eventually came into conflict with the Romanian Communist government of Gheorghe Gheorghiu-Dej. He became a political prisoner and was ultimately executed.

=== Bulgaria ===
The 1947 trial of Nikola Petkov, leader of the Bulgarian Agrarian National Union, was a staged show trial and a landmark in the establishment of communist rule in Bulgaria. Arrested in June 1947 despite parliamentary immunity, Petkov was convicted of espionage and overthrowing the government on August 16, 1947, and executed on September 23, 1947

Traicho Kostov was a major communist party secretary general, and after Stalin ordered, he tried for treason and "anti-Soviet views." Notably, he defied the script by repudiating his confession in court, though he was still executed in 1949.

=== GDR ===
The 1950 Waldheim Trials were a series of secret show trials held in the German Democratic Republic (GDR) from April to June 1950, where courts sentenced over 3,300 ex-POW transferred from Soviet special camps—without legal representation or proper due process. These trials served to legitimize Stalinist rule by prosecuting former Nazis and political opponents.

The Dessau Show Trial of 1950 was one of the earliest high-profile political show trials in the German Democratic Republic (GDR), staged to consolidate communist power and intimidate political opponents. Held in the Dessau Theatre under judge Hilde Benjamin, it targeted employees of the Deutsche Continental-Gasgesellschaft, establishing a pattern of legal propaganda and staged justice.

== Western Europe ==
=== Nazi Germany ===
Between 1933 and 1945, Nazi Germany established a large number of Sondergerichte that were frequently used to prosecute those hostile to the regime. The People's Court was a kangaroo court established in 1934 to handle political crimes, after several of the defendants at the Reichstag fire Trial were acquitted. Between 1933 and 1945, an estimated 12,000 Germans were killed on the orders of the "special courts" set up by the Nazi regime.

== Western Asia ==
=== Azerbaijan ===
Since 2020, Azerbaijan has detained over 160 Armenians, including civilians, former soldiers, and leaders of Nagorno-Karabakh. Multiple human rights organizations and experts condemned Azerbaijan for these detentions, sometimes considering the charges to be fabricated to support sham trials.

A notable case was the 2025 trial of the former leadership of the breakaway Republic of Artsakh. The court hearings were held behind closed doors in a purpose-built Baku military court with information disseminated only by a single Azerbaijani state-run news agency. International observers and foreign media were denied access to the hearings and the defendants were represented exclusively by Azerbaijani lawyers. The trial itself has been characterized as a show trial. The European Parliament called for sanctions against the Azerbaijani prosecutors and judges involved in the trial: Jamal Ramazanov, Anar Rzayev, and Zeynal Agayev. The historian Michael Rubin and others compared drew parallels with the Armenian Genocide in which Armenian leaders were arrested, tried, and deported by Ottoman authorities.

=== Iran ===
In the current Iranian regime there are no juries in Islamic Revolutionary Courts—trial by one's peers only exists in some special courts—with verdicts set before the trial. Trials have on several occasions been labeled as show trials due to their proceedings.

== See also ==
- 1301 trial of Bernard Saisset, Paris.
- 1415 trial of Jan Hus, Konstanz
- 1431 trial of Joan of Arc, Rouen
- 1535 trial of Thomas More
- 1536 trial of Anne Boleyn
- 1649 trial of Charles I
- 1792 trial of Louis XVI during the French Revolution
- 1894 Trial of the Thirty, Paris
- 1897 Trial and execution of Haymarket riots anarchist leaders, Chicago
- 1927 Trial and execution of Sacco and Vanzetti, Massachusetts
- 1946 Trial of Mihailović et al and execution, Belgrade
- 1948 trial and execution of Shafiq Ades, Iraq
- 1949 trial of József Mindszenty
- 1949 trial of László Rajk
- 1953 Stalinist show trial of the Kraków Curia, Poland
- 1963 trial of premier Abdul Karim Qassim of Iraq
- 1981 trial of the Gang of Four in China
- 1984 televised trial and execution of Al-Sadek Hamed Al-Shuwehdy in Libya
- 1989 Trial of Nicolae and Elena Ceaușescu and execution
- 2009 Iran poll protests trial of over 140 defendants
- The trial of Saddam Hussein
- 2013 trial of Jang Song-thaek in North Korea
- Eastern Bloc politics
- NKVD troika, sentencing by extrajudicial commission
- Political trial, a criminal trial with political implications.
- Posthumous trial
- Victor's justice, prosecution of the defeated party's acts in a conflict by the victorious party, typically in public tribunal
- Kangaroo court
- Witch-hunt, hunting down people of a certain race/trait/profession/political conviction for doing or saying something sinful
- Summary execution: (also called field execution) is the putting to death of a person accused of a crime without the benefit of a free and fair trial.
- Extrajudicial killing
- Extrajudicial punishment
- Arbitrary arrest and detention
- Purge
- Torture
