= Teleki =

Teleki de Szék
- Country: Principality of Transylvania; Kingdom of Hungary; Holy Roman Empire; Austro-Hungarian Monarchy
- Founded: 1685
- Founder: Mihály Teleki
- Titles: Imperial Counts

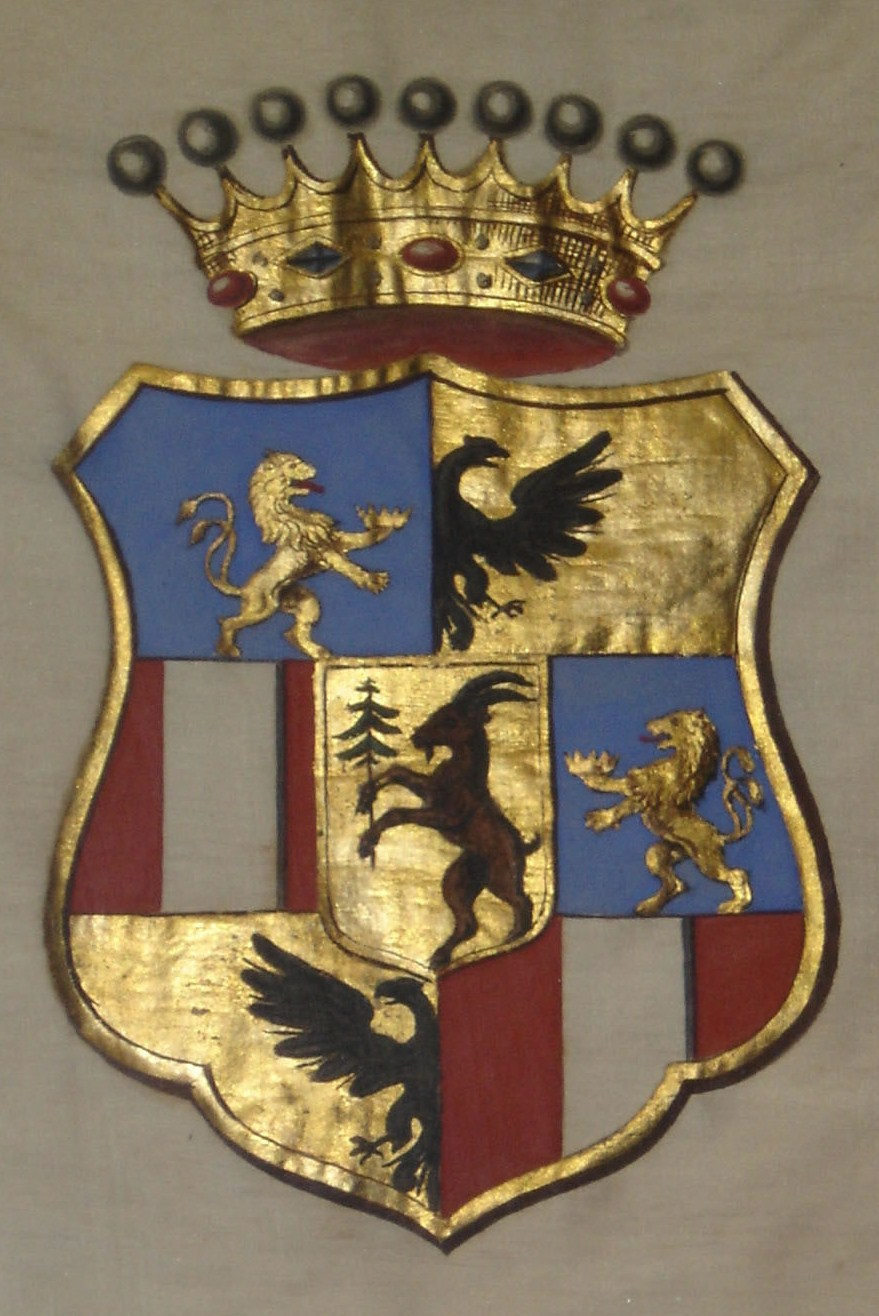
Coat of arms of Counts Teleki de Szék

The Teleki family is an old Hungarian noble family whose members, for centuries, occupied many important positions in the Principality of Transylvania, in the Holy Roman Empire and later in the Austro-Hungarian Empire.

== History ==
The family was originally called Garázda as they originated from Goražde, today's Bosnia and Herzegovina and was first mentioned in the 14th century. Szilágyi family is said to be collateral branch of this family. When Anna, the only member of one Székely branch of the Garázda family, married to Mihály Garázda, called Teleki, member of another existing family branch, their descendants left the name Garázda, and from then on they used the suffix Teleki de Szék. Members of the Teleki family bear the title Imperial Count which was given to them by Leopold I, Holy Roman Emperor in 1697.

== Properties of Teleki family ==
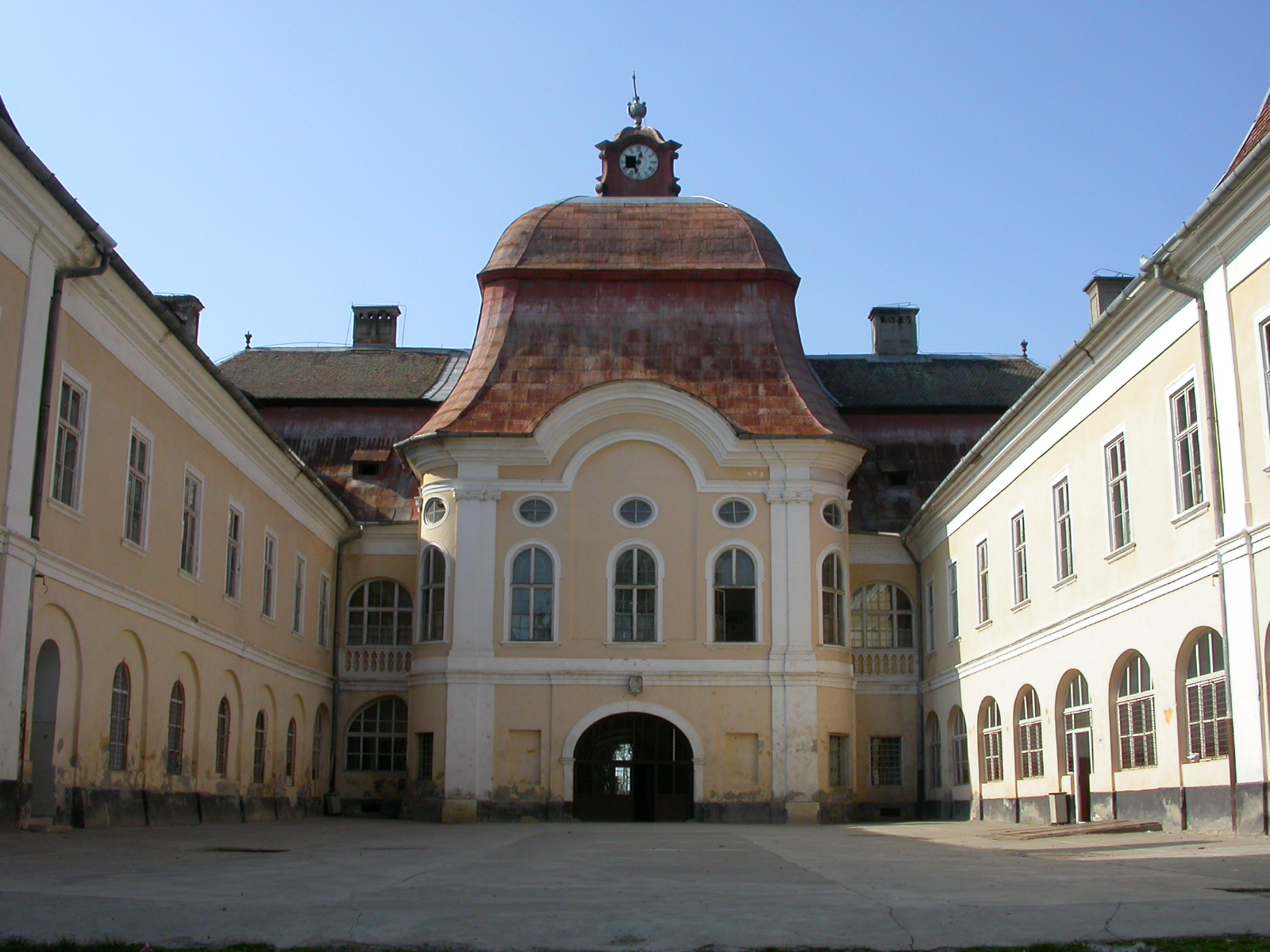
Teleki Castle, Gornești

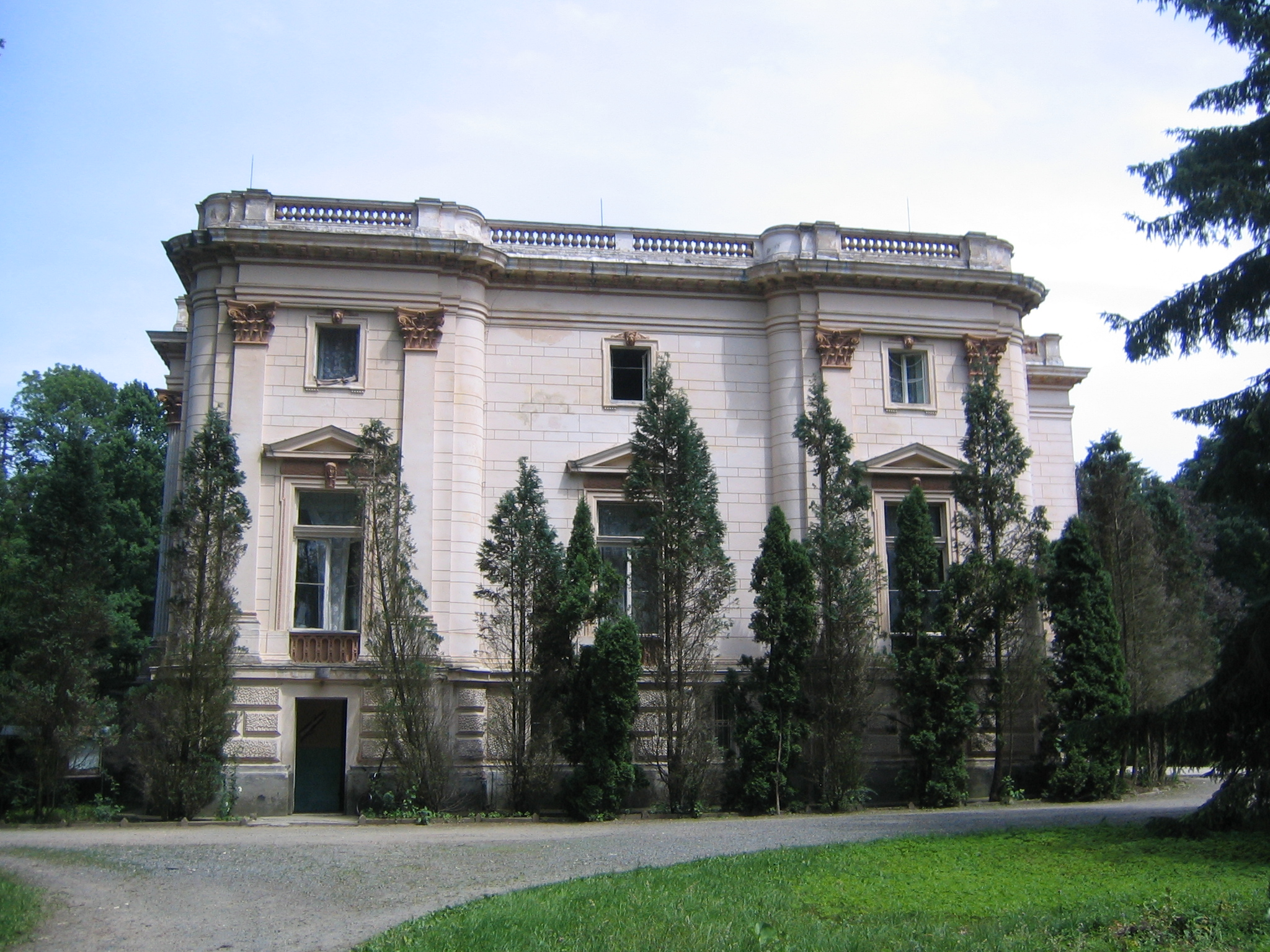
Teleki-Mocioni Castle, Arad

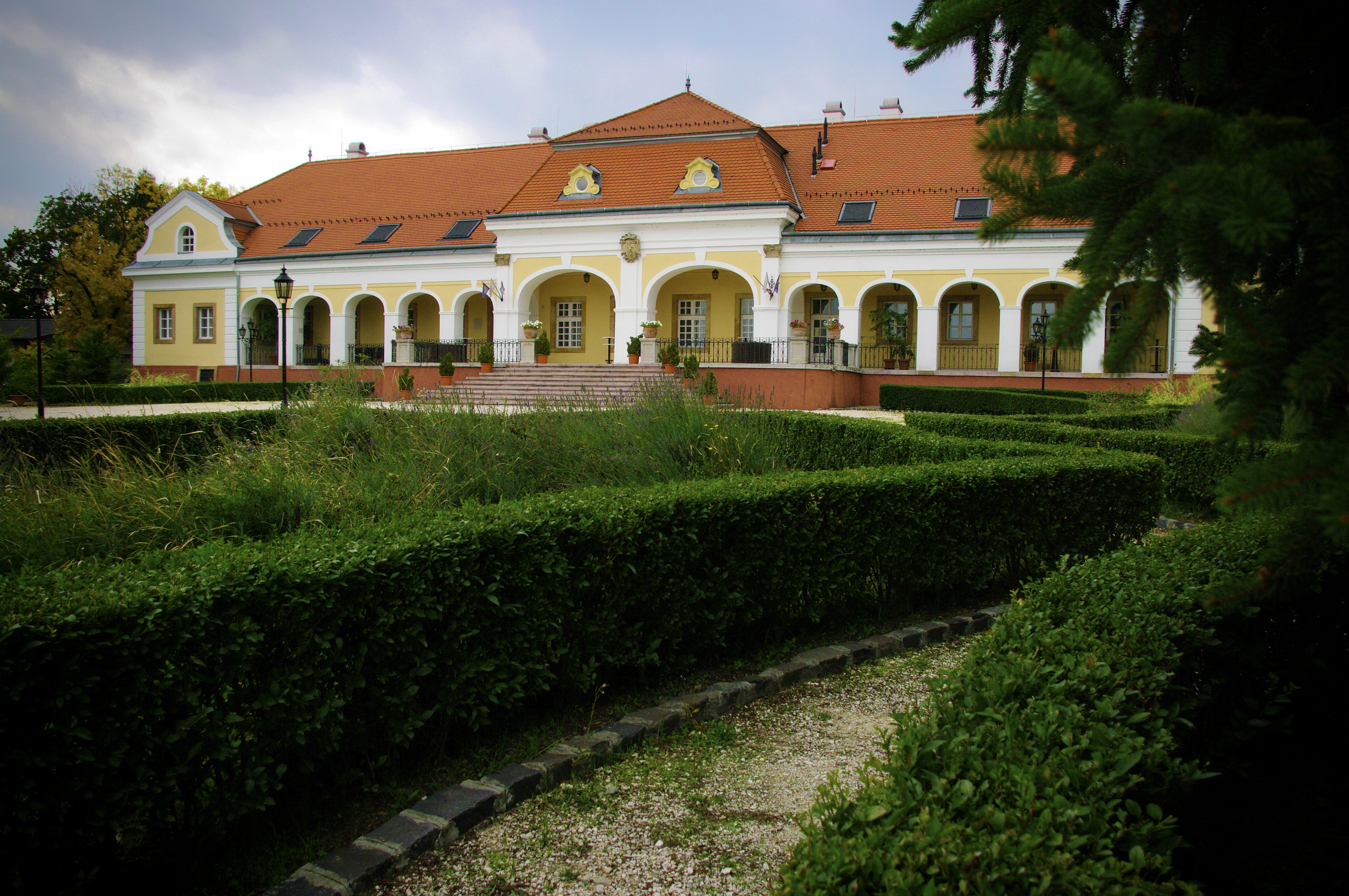
Teleki-Wattay Castle, Hungary

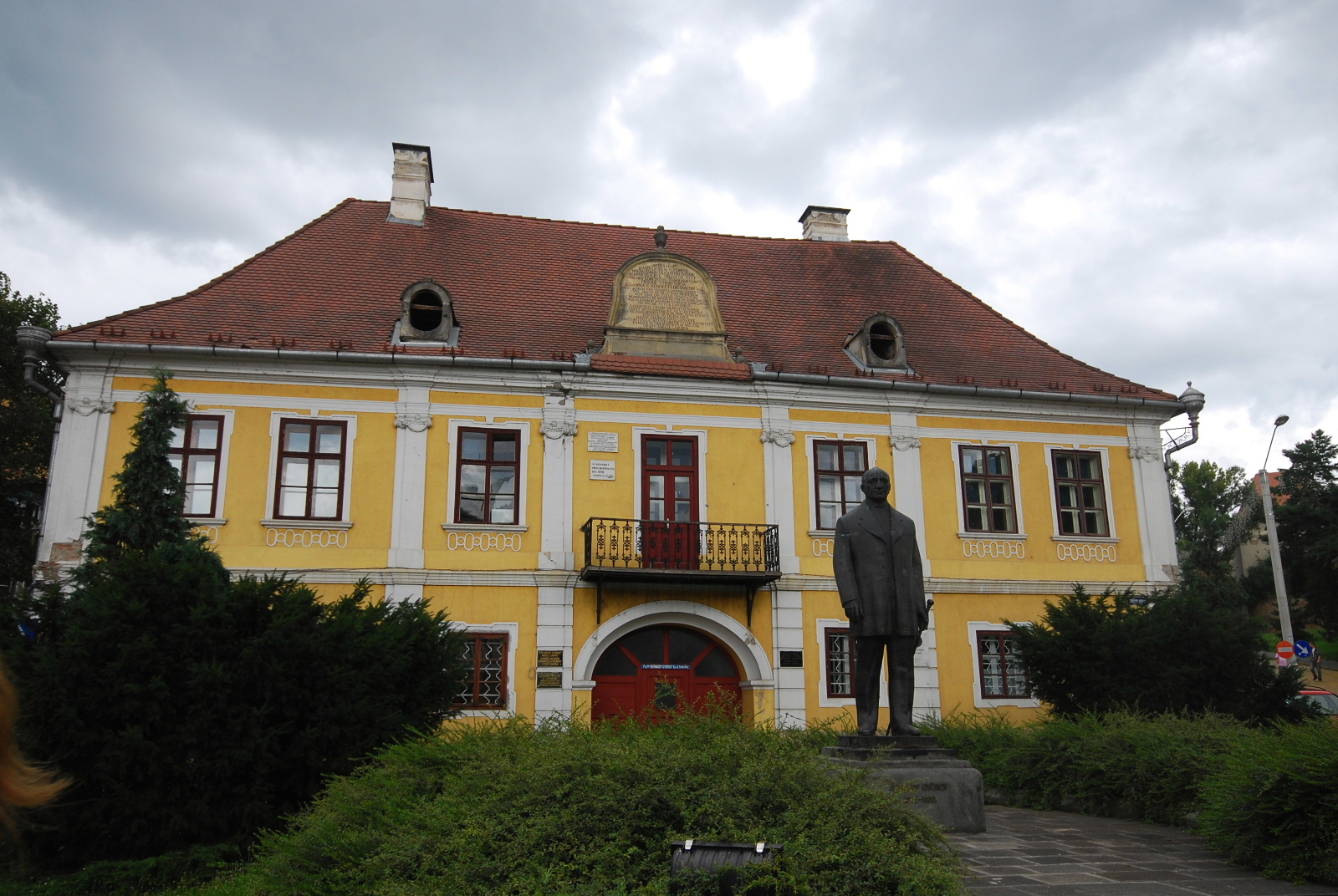
Teleki Castle, Târgu Mureș

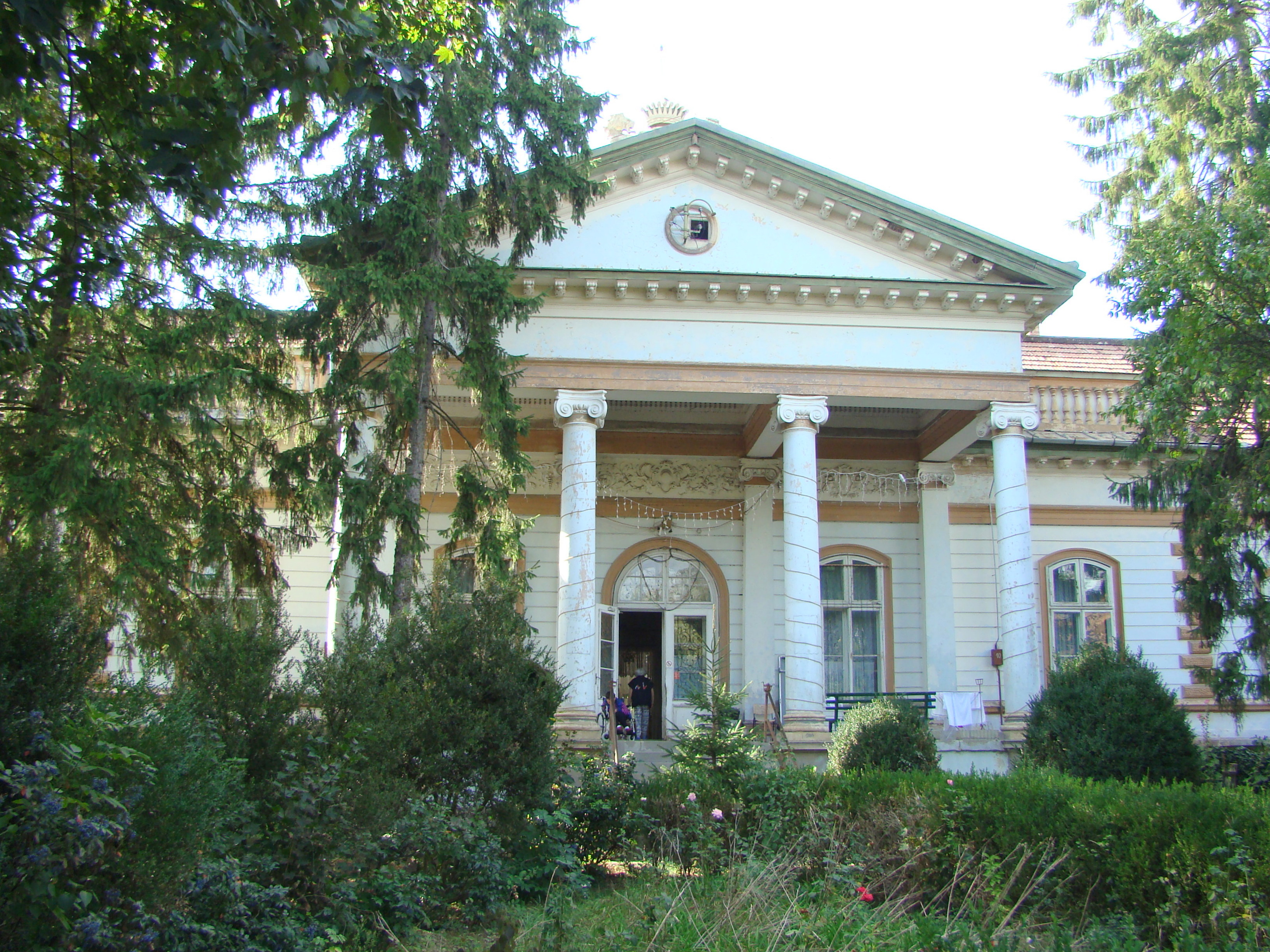
Teleki Castle, Glodeni

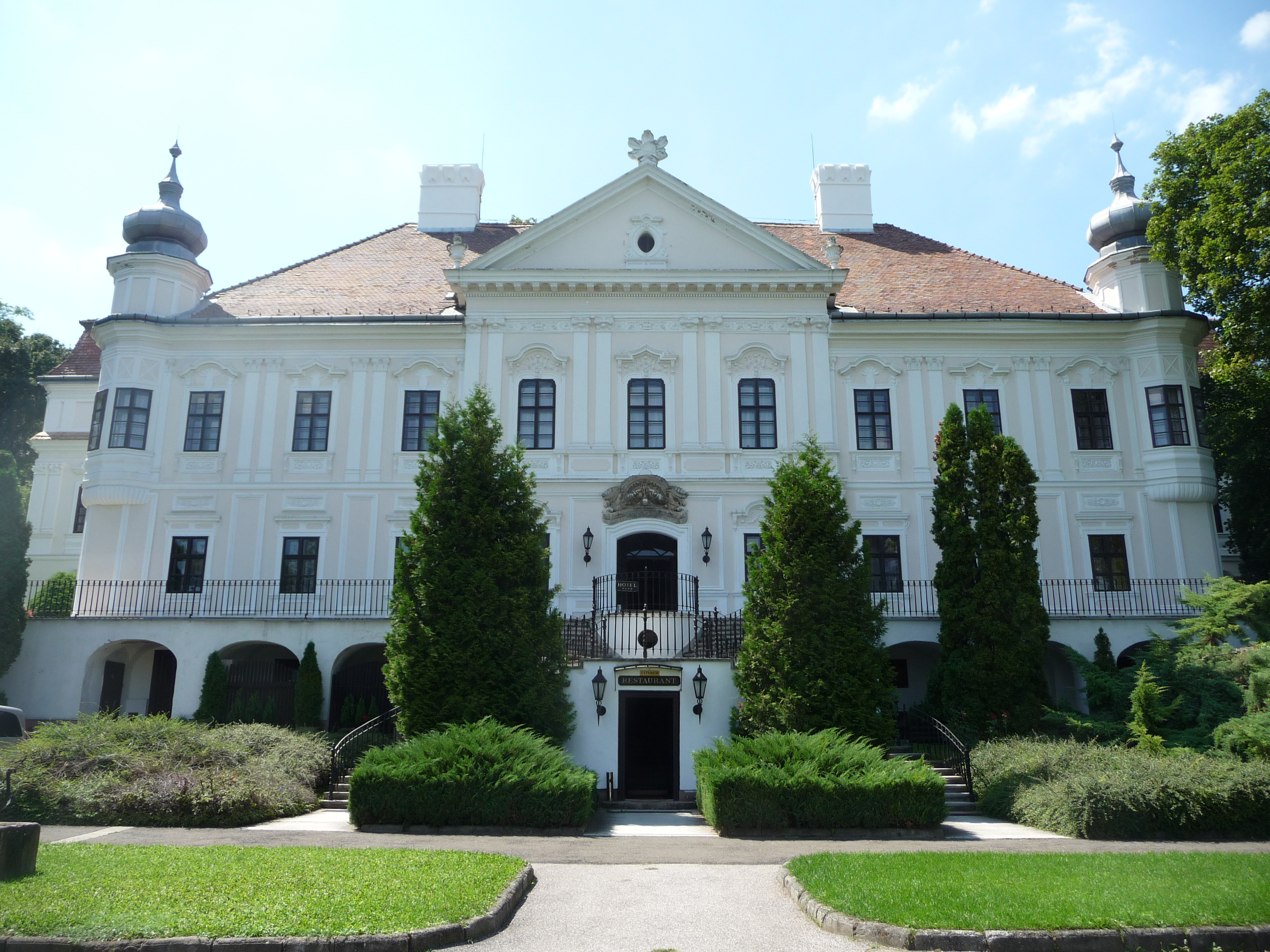
Teleki Castle, Szirák

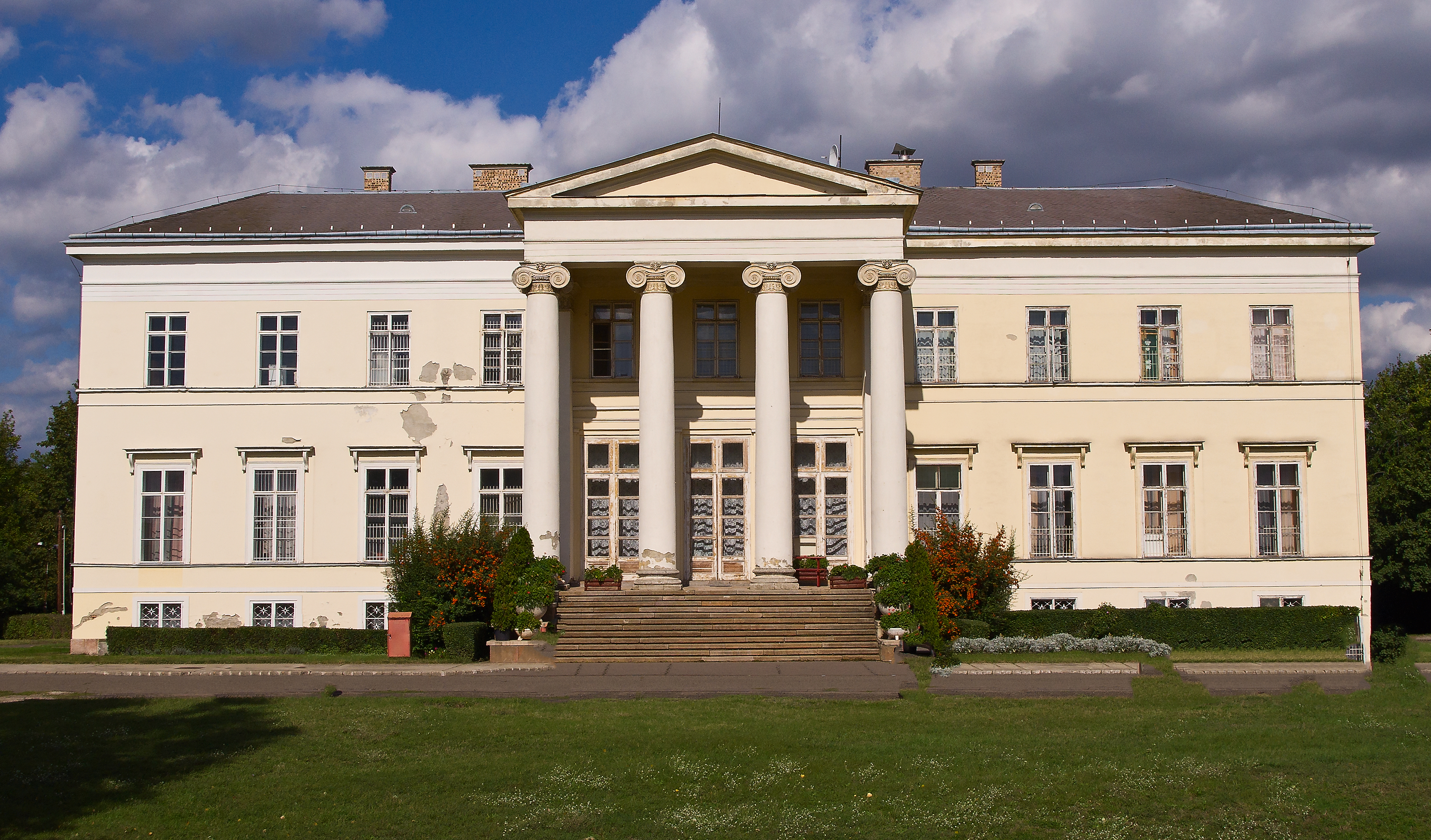
Teleki Castle, Gyömrő

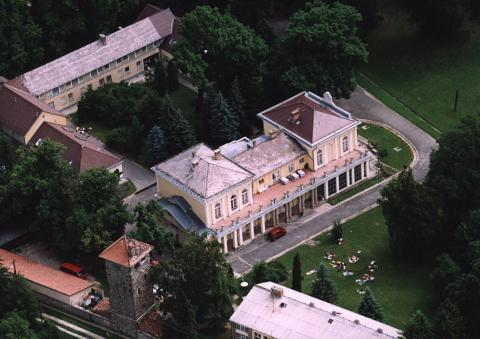
Tisza-Teleki Castle, Nagykovácsi

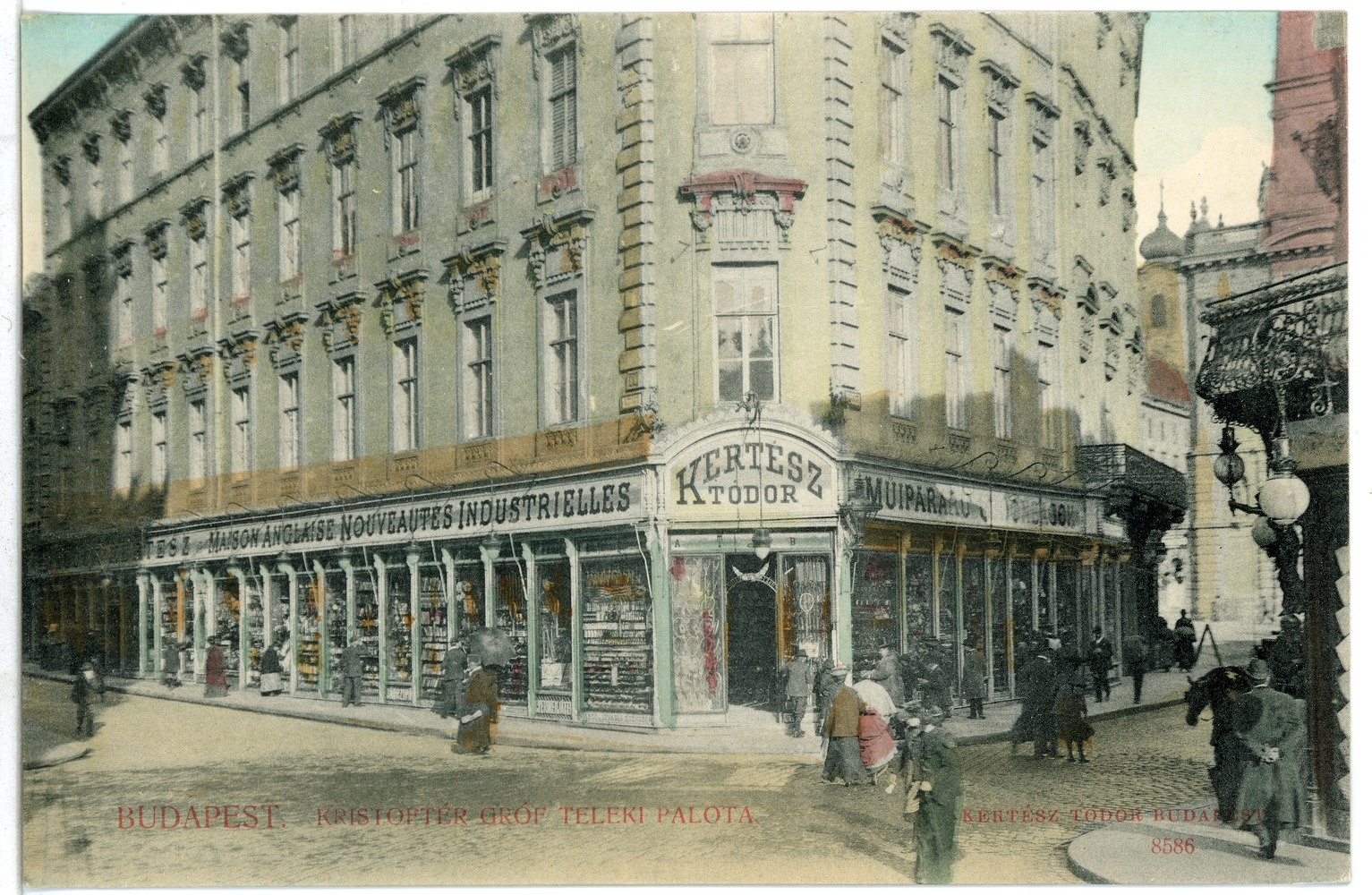
Teleki Palace, Budapest

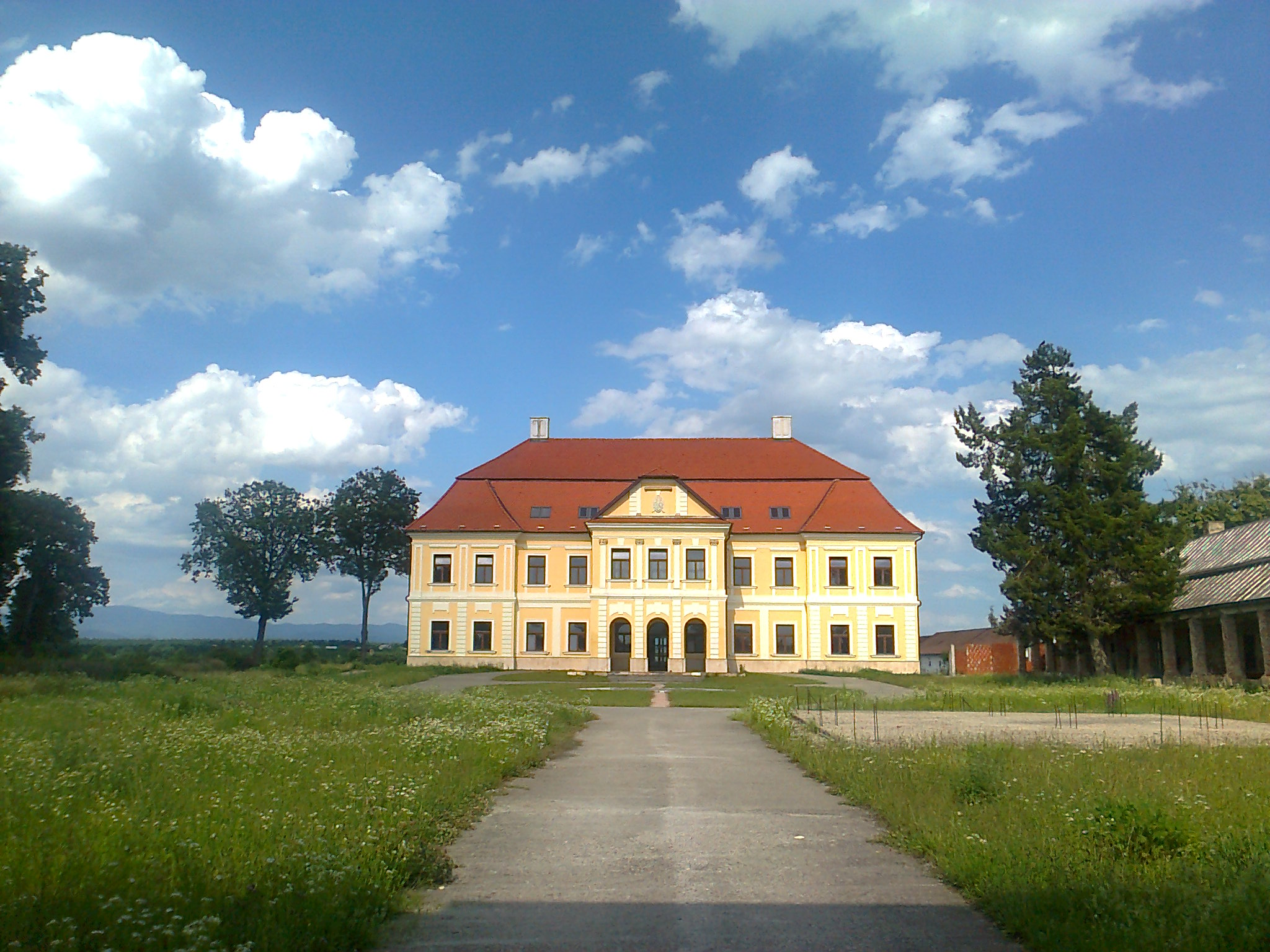
Teleki Castle, Satulung/Kővárhosszúfalu

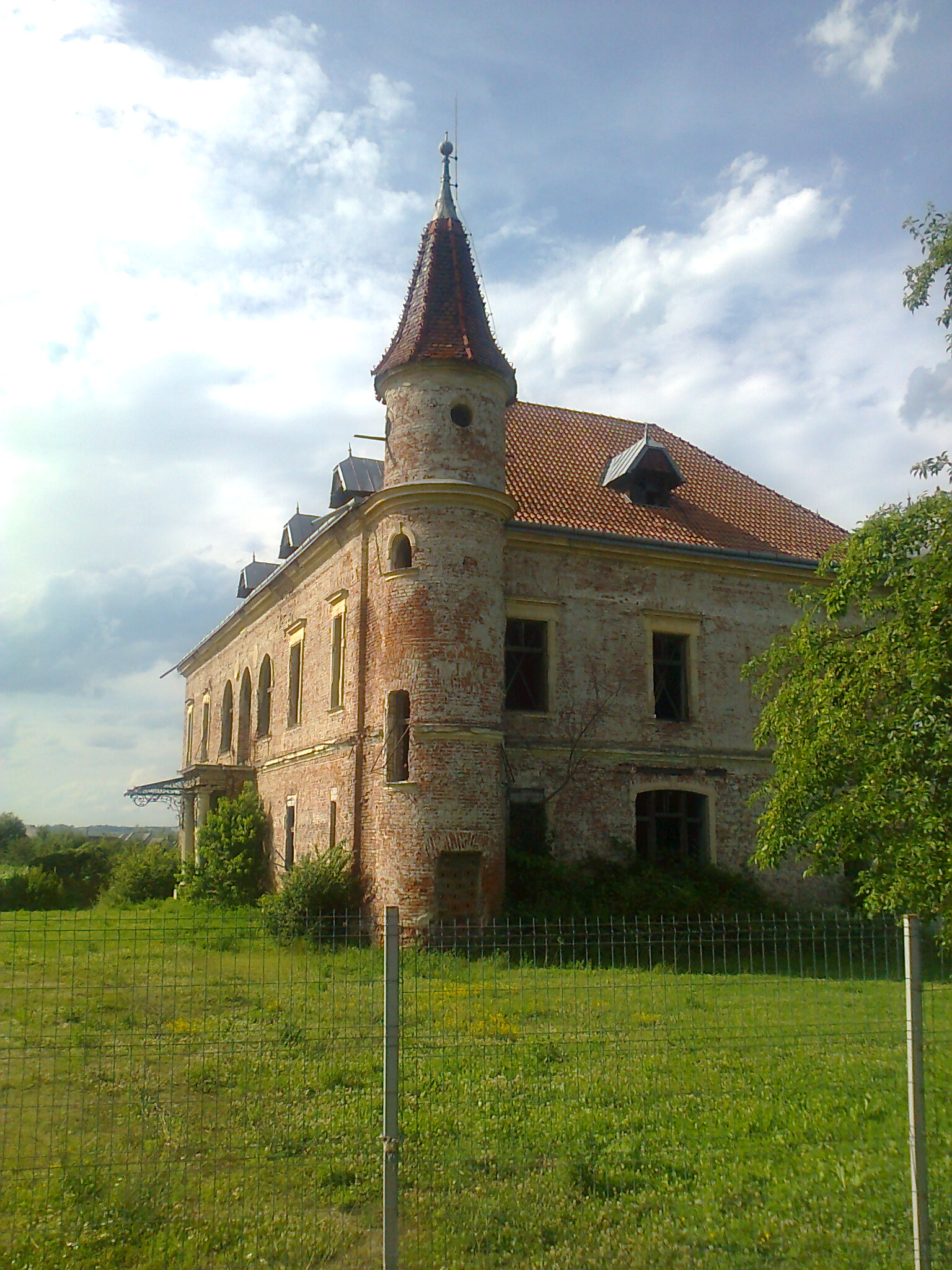
Teleki Castle, Pribilești/Pribékfalva, Maramureș county

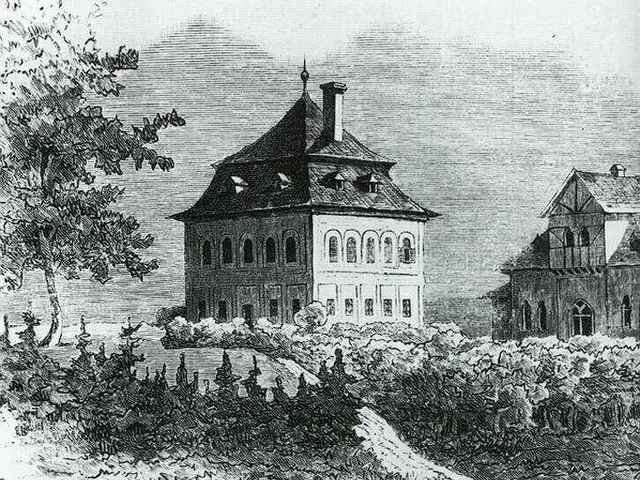
Teleki Castle, Coltău

== Notable members of the family ==
- Teleki de Szék family
  - Count Mihály Teleki (1634–1690), Chancellor of Transylvania
  - Count Sámuel Teleki (de Szék) (1739–1822), chancellor of Transylvania, founder of the Teleki Library
  - Count Ádám Teleki de Szék (1789–1851), honvéd general in the Revolution of 1848 (hu)
  - Count József Teleki de Szék (1790–1855), jurist and historian, first President of the Hungarian Academy of Sciences
  - Countess Blanka Teleki de Szék (1806–1862), educator and women's rights activist
  - Count László Teleki IV (de Szék) (1811–1861), politician and writer
  - Count Géza Teleki de Szék (1843–1913), Hungarian politician
  - Count Sámuel Teleki (de Szék) (1845–1916), explorer
  - Countess Margit Teleki de Szék (1860–1922), Hungarian noblewoman and prime minister's wife
  - Count Pál Teleki (de Szék) (1879–1941), prime minister of Hungary
  - Count Mihály Teleki de Szék (1896–1991), Hungarian politician
  - Count Géza Teleki de Szék (1911–1983), athlete, politician, academic geologist
- Pál Teleki (1906–1985), Hungarian footballer
- Gyula Teleki (born Tiegelmann, 1928–2017), a Hungarian national football player, coach

== Place names ==
- Teleki, a village in Somogy county

== Other ==
- Teleki Library (est. 1802) (Latin: Bibliotheca Telekiana)
- Teleki Blanka Gymnasium (est. 1873), school in Budapest

== See also ==
- Telek (Romanian: Teleac), means "crossing"
- List of titled noble families in the Kingdom of Hungary
