= Sámuel Teleki =

Sámuel Teleki may refer to:

- Sámuel Teleki (chancellor) (1739–1822), Chancellor of Transylvania
- Sámuel Teleki (explorer) (1845–1916), Hungarian explorer, grandson of above
