= Gyula Kornis =

Hungarian philosopher and politician

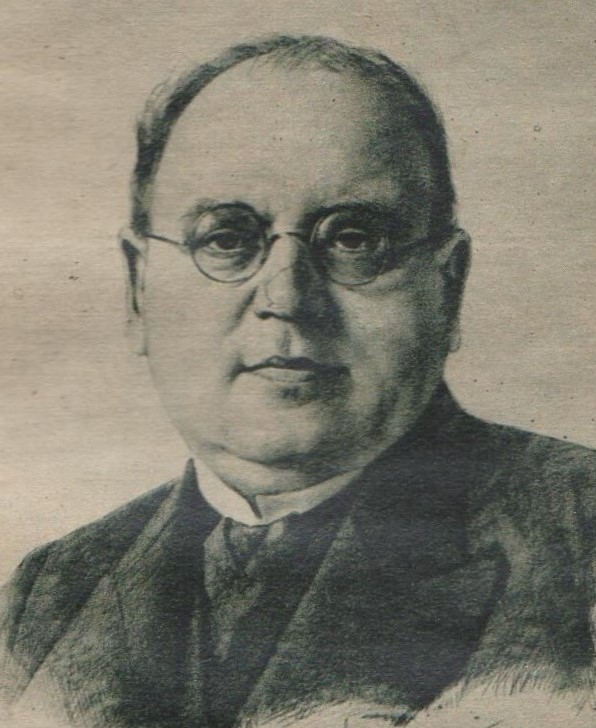

Speaker of the House of Representatives
- In office 20 May 1938 – 1 December 1938
- Preceded by: Sándor Sztranyavszky
- Succeeded by: Kálmán Darányi

Personal details
- Born: 22 December 1885 Vác, Austria-Hungary
- Died: 17 April 1958 (aged 72) Budapest, People's Republic of Hungary
- Party: Unity Party; Party of National Unity
- Profession: educator

Gyula Kornis (originally Kremer Gyula; 22 December 1885 – 17 April 1958) was a Hungarian Piarist, philosopher, educator, professor and politician, who served as Speaker of the House of Representatives for a short time in 1938.

He had an important role in implementation of educational policy of Count Kuno von Klebelsberg, Minister of Religion and Education in the cabinet of István Bethlen in the 1920s. Kornis also served as interim President of the Hungarian Academy of Sciences in 1945, after the Second World War.

In the 1933/34 academic year, he was the Dean of the Faculty of Humanities of the Eötvös Loránd University.

== Works ==
- Education in Hungary, New York, 1932
- Hungary and European Civilisation, Budapest, 1938

== Sources ==
- Bimbó Mihály: Kornis Gyula Történetfilozófiá-ja – Kossuth Lajos Tudományegyetem, Debrecen, 1999, 94 o. – ISBN 963-472-394-2
- Demeter Katalin: Széljegyzetek Kornis Gyula Nietzsche és Petőfi című írásához – Kultúra, műveltség, oktatás Kornis Gyula nézőpontjából – In: Filozófia–Művelődés–Történet 2007 – Az Eötvös Lóránd Tudományegyetem Tanító- és Óvóképző Főiskolai Karának Tudományos Közleményei XXIX. – Trezor Kiadó, Budapest, 2007, 191–210. o. – ISSN 0139-4991 – Accessed: 2011. January 5. 22:00.
- Hanák Tibor: Kornis Gyula – In: Az elfelejtett reneszánsz – A magyar filozófiai gondolkodás a század első felében – Göncöl Kiadó, Budapest, 1993, 97–100. o. – ISBN 963-7875-64-6
- Kováts Gyuláné: Kultúra és politika Kornis Gyula közoktatáspolitikai tevékenységében – Hazafias Népfront Győr-Sopron Megyei Bizottsága, Győr, 1989, 147 o. – ISBN 963-00-1296-0
- Kovátsné Németh Mária: Kornis Gyula kultúrelméleti felfogása – Magyar Pedagógia, 1995, 1–2. sz. 77–87. o. – Accessed: 2011. January 5. 22:00.
- Mészáros István: Egy sztoikus bölcs – kitelepítve. Kornis Gyula 1951–1957 közötti leveleiből – Szabadelvű Unió, 1990, 41–49. o. (különszám)
- Nagy József: Kornis Gyula mint kultúrpolitikus – Minerva, Budapest, 1928, 8. sz. 19 o.
- Perecz László: A pozitivizmustól a szellemtörténetig, – Horror Metaphysicae, – Osiris Kiadó, Budapest, 1998, 244 o. – ISBN 963-379-399-8
- Somos Róbert: Filozófia és politika Kornis Gyula munkásságában – Valóság, XLVI. évf., 2003, 2. sz. 63–78. o. – Accessed: 2011. January 5. 22:00
- Szabolcs Éva: Értékelmélet és kultúrfilozófia a Magyar Paedagogia című folyóiratban – Kornis Gyula és Prohászka Lajos – In. A szellemtudományi pedagógia magyar recepciója – Szerk.: Németh András – Gondolat Kiadó, Budapest, 2004, 145–160. o. – ISBN 963-9567-69-8
- Tar Károly: Kornis Gyula nevelésfilozófiájának főbb sajátosságai – Tankönyvkiadó, Budapest, 1964, 5–15. o. (Klny.)

Political offices
Preceded by Sándor Sztranyavszky	Speaker of the House of Representatives; 1938	Succeeded by Kálmán Darányi
Cultural offices
Preceded by Archduke Joseph	President of the Hungarian Academy of Sciences; 1945	Succeeded by Gyula Moór
