= Kálmán Darányi =

Hungarian politician (1886–1939)

Noble Kálmán Darányi de Pusztaszentgyörgy et Tetétlen
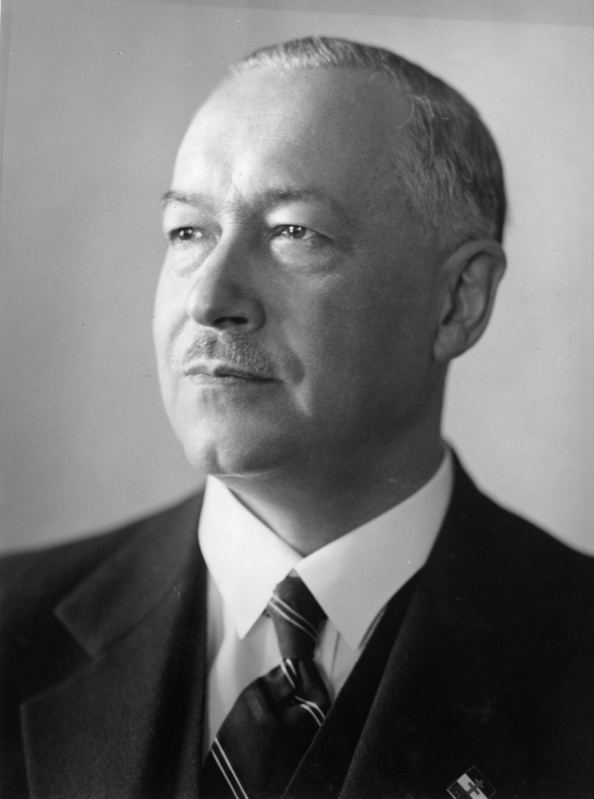

Prime Minister of Hungary
- In office 6 October 1936 – 14 May 1938
- Regent: Miklós Horthy
- Preceded by: Gyula Gömbös
- Succeeded by: Béla Imrédy

Speaker of the House of Representatives
- In office 5 December 1938 – 1 November 1939
- Preceded by: Gyula Kornis
- Succeeded by: András Tasnádi Nagy

Member of the House of Representatives
- In office 31 January 1927 – 1 November 1939

Personal details
- Born: 22 March 1886 Budapest, Austria-Hungary
- Died: 1 November 1939 (aged 53) Budapest, Kingdom of Hungary
- Party: Unity Party
- Spouse: Márta Szemere
- Profession: politician

Kálmán Darányi de Pusztaszentgyörgy et Tetétlen (22 March 1886 – 1 November 1939) was a Hungarian politician who served as Prime Minister of Hungary from 1936 to 1938. He also served as Speaker of the House of Representatives of Hungary from 5 December 1938 to 12 June 1939 and from 15 June 1939 to 1 November 1939. Darányi was associated with the radical rights in the Hungarian politics, and although not sympathetic to the Hungarian fascists, pursued an increasingly authoritarian policy at home, and an alliance with the fascist powers Germany and Italy abroad.

== Early life ==
His parents were Béla Darányi and Antónia Nagy. His uncle was Ignác Darányi who served as the Minister of Agriculture during the Austro-Hungarian Monarchy. Darányi started his civil service career in 1909 at Pest-Pilis-Solt-Kiskun County. After the revolutions of 1918–1919 he served as commissioner then ispán (county head) of Győr County, Komárom County and Győr. Darányi became a member of the Hungarian Diet in 1927. Gyula Gömbös appointed him Minister of Agriculture in 1935. In addition to his political activities he played a leadership role in the Agricultural class movement. He also took part in the life of the Calvinist Church as a member of the Universal Convent and synod.

== Prime Minister of Hungary ==
Darányi replaced the ailing Gyula Gömbös as prime minister. After the death of Gömbös, Regent Miklós Horthy appointed Darányi as Gömbös' successor on 12 October 1936. Darányi wanted to return to the platform of István Bethlen with a program to preserve constitutional order, but he did not want to turn sharply against Gömbös' political testament. He maintained the promise of secret suffrage, but first of all he wanted to increase the gubernatorial jurisdiction and the House of Magnates' role.

He set himself apart from right-wing and left-wing extremes both during the initial period of his prime ministership. In April 1937 he banned the Party of National Will, which was the predecessor of the Hungarian National Socialist Party and the Arrow Cross Party. Ferenc Szálasi, the leader of the party, was arrested and sentenced to imprisonment for three years. But the March Front (founded on 15 March 1937), a progressive political-intellectual movement, was also subjected to police harassment and prosecutions.

Darányi and his Minister of Foreign Affairs, Kálmán Kánya attempted to strengthen contacts with the United Kingdom and France to balance pressure from Nazi Germany. However, the Western powers were not very receptive of these endeavors. Hungarian foreign policy continued to promote the country's relationship with Italy at the same time. The thought of the cooperation between Italy, Yugoslavia, Hungary and Poland was resumed in Rome.

During his term the gubernatorial jurisdiction was expanded again (for the fourth time). The Regent was now allowed to delay the implementation of bills by up to a year, and he was no longer accountable to Parliament. The law also specified the role of the National Council in case of vacancy of the gubernatorial seat. The House of Magnates' jurisdiction was also expanded: the upper house could now return laws to the lower house twice.

In 1938, Darányi accepted the law of suffrage that was advocated by Gyula Gömbös. This law modified earlier provisions in two areas: it abolished the open vote in favor of the secret ballot, but narrowed suffrage rights. The new law reduced the number of eligible voters by 250,000 – 300,000. The minimum voting age for men was now 26 (in regional elections) and 30 (in constituency elections), while for women, the universal voting age was 30 years. He introduced mandatory old-age social insurance for agricultural workers. For the civil servants the work week was set at 44 hours while for industrial workers, 48 hours.

The Hungarian military force's state was disastrous. To address this, Darányi presented the Győr Program, which was drawn up by Béla Imrédy. The aim of the program was to modernize the army and upgrade its equipment. The government allocated one billion pengős for the program. This, originally earmarked for five years, was spent in under two years. Of the program's budget, 60% was used for the development of the army while 40% was spent on infrastructure. This program's invigorating effect on the economy was considerable.

After the Anschluss, Darányi's political direction changed. As of March 1938, Hungary was now a neighbor of Nazi Germany. A vigorous Nazi propaganda campaign was initiated in the country. Darányi shifted towards the right in response. He appointed pro-German politicians to his cabinet. He regularly expressed the importance of the German relations. Darányi began secret negotiations with Kálmán Hubay with the intention of uniting right extremist forces. He agreed to allow Arrow Cross Party members to run for parliament so long as these right extremist politicians agreed to respect the law. Conservatives responded to these steps with distrust. Horthy also expressed his discontent, which is why Darányi resigned as prime minister on 11 May 1938. He was followed by Béla Imrédy in this position.

== Later life ==
Promoting the First Anti-Jewish Law and its preparation are connected to his name yet. This bill was introduced to the parliament during his prime ministership, but it already became a law during reign of Imrédy. Kálmán Darányi served as Speaker of the House of Representatives from 5 December 1938 until his death.

Political offices
Preceded by Miklós Kállay	Minister of Agriculture; 1935–1938	Succeeded by Ferenc Marschall
Preceded by Gyula Gömbös	Prime Minister of Hungary; 1936–1938	Succeeded by Béla Imrédy
Preceded by Miklós Kozma	Minister of the Interior; Acting; 1937	Succeeded by József Széll
Preceded by Gyula Kornis	Speaker of the House of Representatives; 1938–1939	Succeeded by András Tasnádi Nagy
