= Béla Jurcsek =

Hungarian politician (1893–1945)

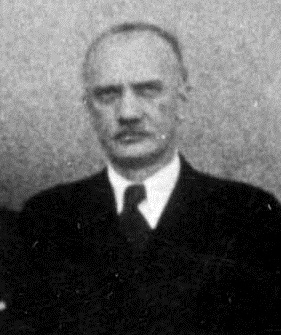

Minister of Agriculture of Hungary
- In office 22 March 1944 – 16 October 1944
- Preceded by: Dániel Bánffy
- Succeeded by: Fidél Pálffy

Personal details
- Born: 30 August 1893 Tiszatarján, Kingdom of Hungary, Austria-Hungary
- Died: 1945 Kitzbühel, Allied-occupied Austria
- Party: Party of National Unity, Party of Hungarian Life, Arrow Cross Party
- Profession: politician

Béla Jurcsek (30 August 1893 – 1945) was a Hungarian politician, who served as Minister of Agriculture in 1944 and Minister of Welfare between 1944 and 1945.

He was born into a landowning family. He attended secondary school in Nagykároly and studied economy in Debrecen. Then he travelled abroad and also worked briefly in Germany. After the First World War he took part in the political life of Fejér County. From 1916 he was a member of the county's municipality and became chairman of the Alliance of Social Associations' group in Sárbogárd. He also founded the local organization of the Revisionist League. After that he went abroad again (Austria, Italy, Germany). He became chairman of the Party of National Unity (NEP) in Sárbogárd. He was elected a member of the National Assembly in 1935 and in 1939 as a representative of the NEP.

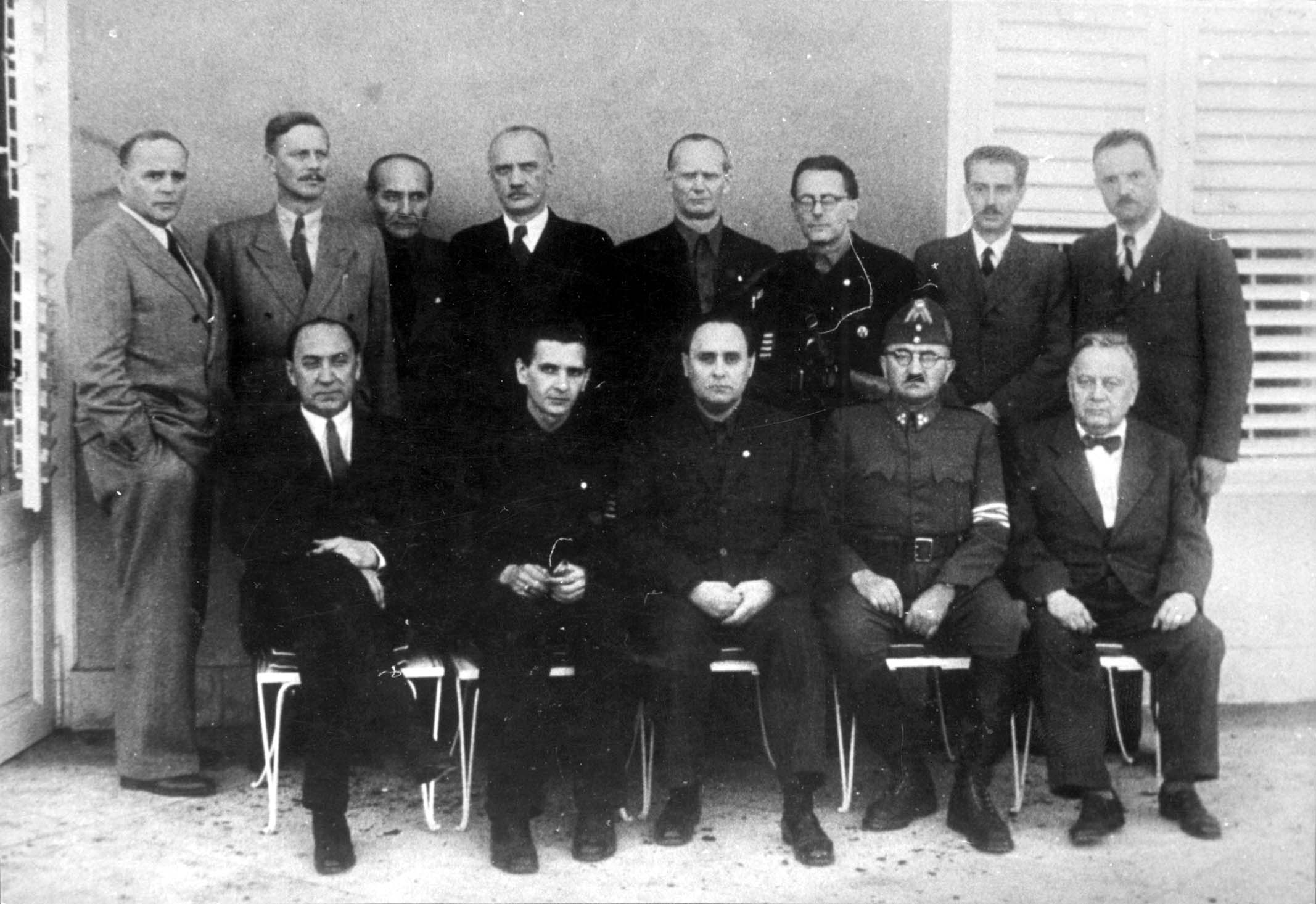
Ministers of the Arrow Cross Party government. Béla Jurcsek is in the fourth from left of the upper row.

In Parliament, he gave speeches mainly on agricultural and social policy issues. He was a member of the party's committee which examined the Jewish question and of the special delegation which smoothed the differences between the House of Magnates and the House of Representatives in connection with the second Jewish law. From June 1940 to February 1941, he served as governor of agricultural processing and marketing. Jurcsek also served as state secretary of the Ministry of Welfare between 1942 and 1944. He devised a delivery system which later was called after him the Jurcsek system. Under the Jurcsek system, peasants had to supply a fixed quota of crops regardless of what were the actual harvest yields. The Ministry of Agriculture assessed the land every spring and determined what the quota was to be in the following autumn based on the size of the landholdings. This program tried to improve the deteriorating situation because of the Second World War. The problem had also appeared during the First World War. Jurcsek wanted to eliminate the black market and hiding.

After the Nazi occupation of Hungary (Operation Margarethe) in the cabinet of Döme Sztójay, he was appointed Minister of Agriculture. He also held this position in the next government, that of Géza Lakatos. Jurcsek worked as a spy for the German minister plenipotentiary Edmund Veesenmayer, selling information about what was being discussed at cabinet meetings. On 6 September 1944, when Lakatos raised the subject at a cabinet meeting of an armistice with the Soviet Union, Jurcsek was one of the ministers most opposed. Afterwards, Jurcsek told Veesenmayer that Latatos was talking about signing an armistice, which led to the planning for Operation Panzerfaust. After the Arrow Cross Party's coup d'état (Operation Panzerfaust), he served as Minister of Welfare. He set up the delivery system which served the needs of the German Army to the detriment of the Hungarian Army and population. He escaped to Austria. When the Soviet Red Army arrived at Zell am See, he committed suicide. The delivery system was also used after World War II.

== Books and links ==
- Cornelius, Deborah S (2011). Hungary in World War II: Caught in the Cauldron. New York: Fordham University Press. ISBN 978-0823233441.
- Magyar Életrajzi Lexikon

Political offices
Preceded by Dániel Bánffy	Minister of Agriculture; 1944	Succeeded by Fidél Pálffy
