= Ferenc Marschall =

Hungarian politician (1887–1970)

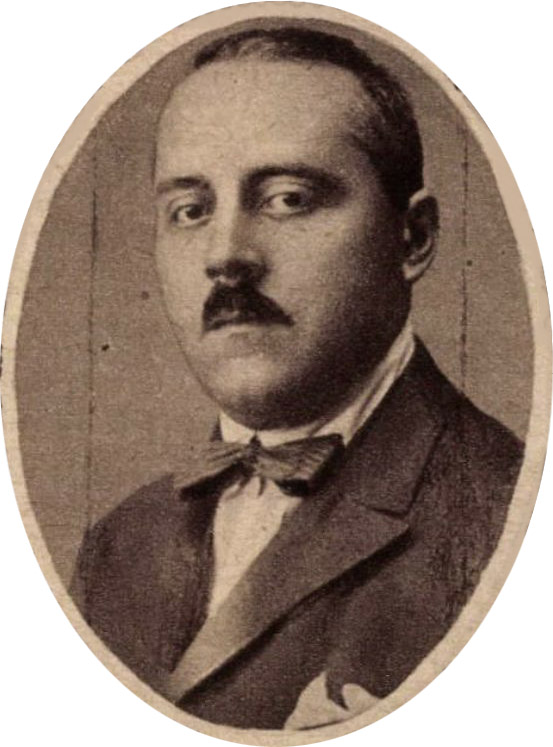

Minister of Agriculture of Hungary
- In office 9 March 1938 – 14 May 1938
- Preceded by: Kálmán Darányi
- Succeeded by: Sándor Sztranyavszky

Personal details
- Born: 2 October 1887 Temesvár, Kingdom of Hungary, Austria-Hungary
- Died: 23 January 1970 (aged 82) Budapest, People's Republic of Hungary
- Political party: Unity Party, Party of National Unity
- Profession: politician

Ferenc Marschall (2 October 1887 – 23 January 1970) was a Hungarian politician, who served as Minister of Agriculture for two months in 1938.

Political offices
| Preceded by Kálmán Darányi | Minister of Agriculture; 1938 | Succeeded by Sándor Sztranyavszky |
