= Sándor Sztranyavszky =

Hungarian politician (1882–1942)

Minister of Agriculture of Hungary
- In office 14 May 1938 – 15 November 1938
- Preceded by: Ferenc Marschall
- Succeeded by: Mihály Teleki

Personal details
- Born: 9 December 1882 Balassagyarmat, Kingdom of Hungary, Austria-Hungary
- Died: 30 April 1942 (aged 59) Nógrádmarcal, Kingdom of Hungary
- Political party: Party of National Work, Unity Party, Party of National Unity
- Profession: politician

Sándor Sztranyavszky (9 December 1882 – 30 April 1942) was a Hungarian politician, who served as Speaker of the House of Representatives of Hungary between 1935 and 1938 and as Minister of Agriculture in 1938.

He started his political career as a representative of the Party of National Work from 1912 until end of the First World War. He was the chief administrator of Nógrád and Hont counties in 1922. He served as political state secretary of the Interior Ministry between 1926 and 1931. He managed the parliamentary elections of 1926 and 1931. During the premiership of Gyula Gömbös he was the chairman of the governing Party of National Unity.

He became Speaker of the House of Representatives (the lower house) in 1935 and holding this office until 1938. The new prime minister Béla Imrédy appointed him Minister of Agriculture on 14 May 1938. Later he did not agree with Imrédy's politics and resigned. In addition, he quit the party along with several conservative politicians and MPs.

Political offices
Preceded by László Almásy	Speaker of the House of Representatives; 1935–1938	Succeeded by Gyula Kornis
Preceded by Ferenc Marschall	Minister of Agriculture; 1938	Succeeded by Mihály Teleki
