= Sámuel Teleki (explorer) =

Hungarian explorer

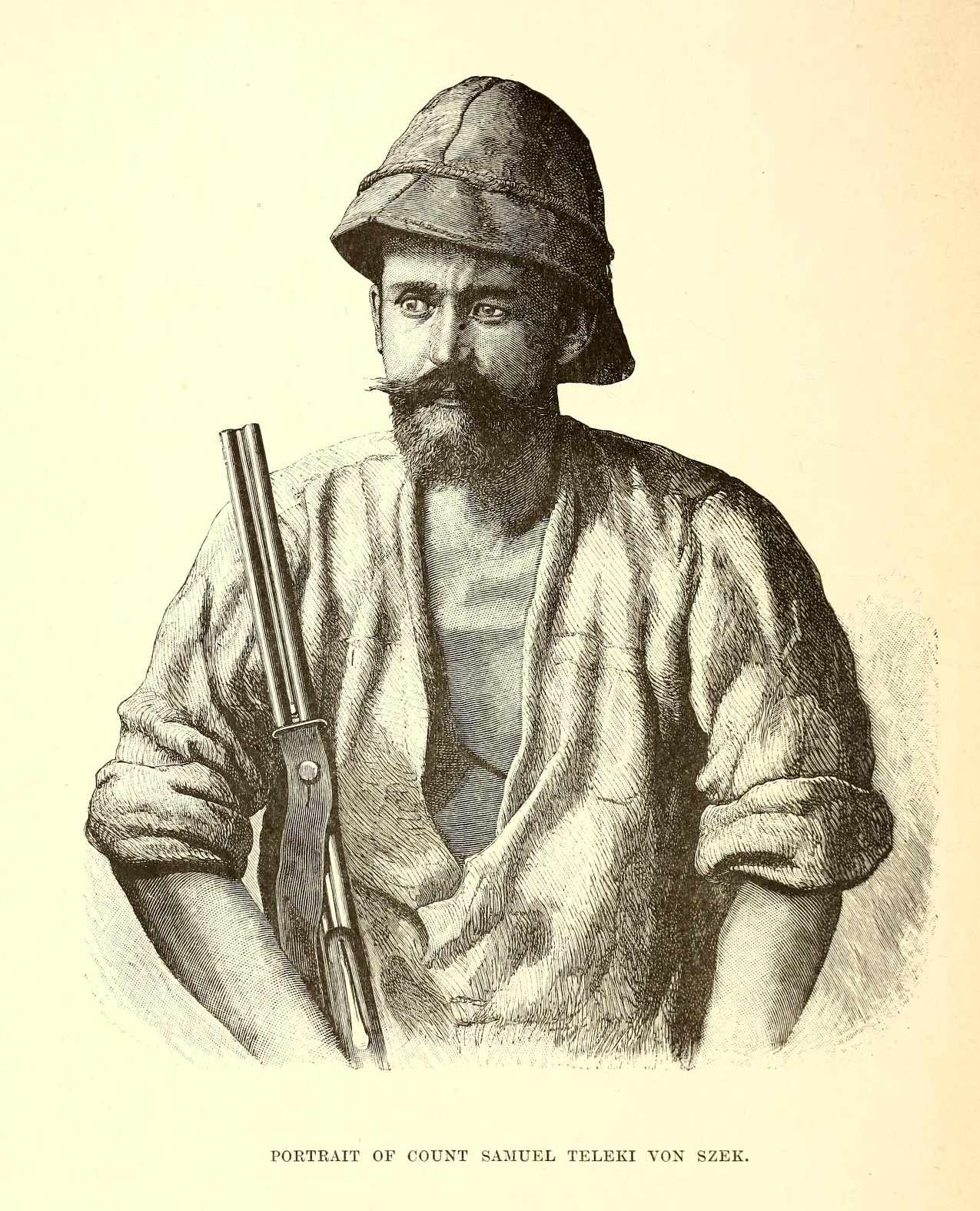
Count Samuel Teleki

Count Sámuel Teleki de Szék (1 November 1845 – 10 March 1916) was a Hungarian noble and explorer who led the first expedition to Northern Kenya. He was the first European to see Lake Turkana and to explore above the snow line of the peaks of Kilimanjaro and Mount Kenya. Several geographical features in East Africa are named after him including Teleki's Volcano at the southern end of Turkana, and Teleki's valley on Mount Kenya. A number of plant and animal specimens were collected on his expedition and many new species were named in his honour.

== Early life ==
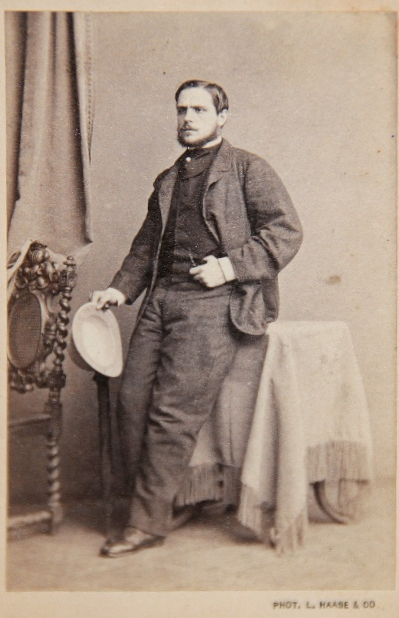
In 1863

Teleki was born in 1845 in Sáromberke (Dumbrvioara), a village in Transylvania, then in the Kingdom of Hungary and today in Romania. His namesake father He was a member of the Teleki family, a prominent landed Hungarian family with vast estates who were active in both politics and culture. His great-grandfather Sámuel Teleki (1739–1822), a chancellor of Transylvania, built the Sáromberg Castle and founded the Teleki library in Marosvásárhely (today Târgu Mureș, Romania), one of the first Hungarian public libraries, which opened in 1802 and holds today more than 200,000 volumes. An uncle, Domokos Teleki (1773–1798), took an interest in mineralogy and had travelled widely. Teleki was tutored at home before going to college in Debrecen and in 1863 he went to study natural sciences at the University of Göttingen and Berlin. Here he not only took cameral studies but attended courses in geology, astronomy and mineralogy. He then became a Lieutenant Colonel in the Hussars and in 1881 he became a member of parliament. He often went hunting in Transylvania with the crown prince Rudolf, son of the Austro-Hungarian Emperor-King Franz Joseph I. Rudolf became a close friend and even expressed his political interest in Hungarian independence to Teleki who was also a member of the Hungarian Parliament. Fascinated by Africa and legends of great lakes, he took up the suggestion of the prince to lead an expedition to Africa in 1886 to the territories north of Lake Baringo beyond where Scottish explorer Joseph Thomson had set foot, in order to find the desert lake previous travellers had heard rumours about, based on local legends about a sea that lay beyond the desert. Teleki prepared for the expedition by visiting the British Museum, the Royal Geographical Society, examining maps and consulting with African travellers.

== First expedition (1887-1888) ==
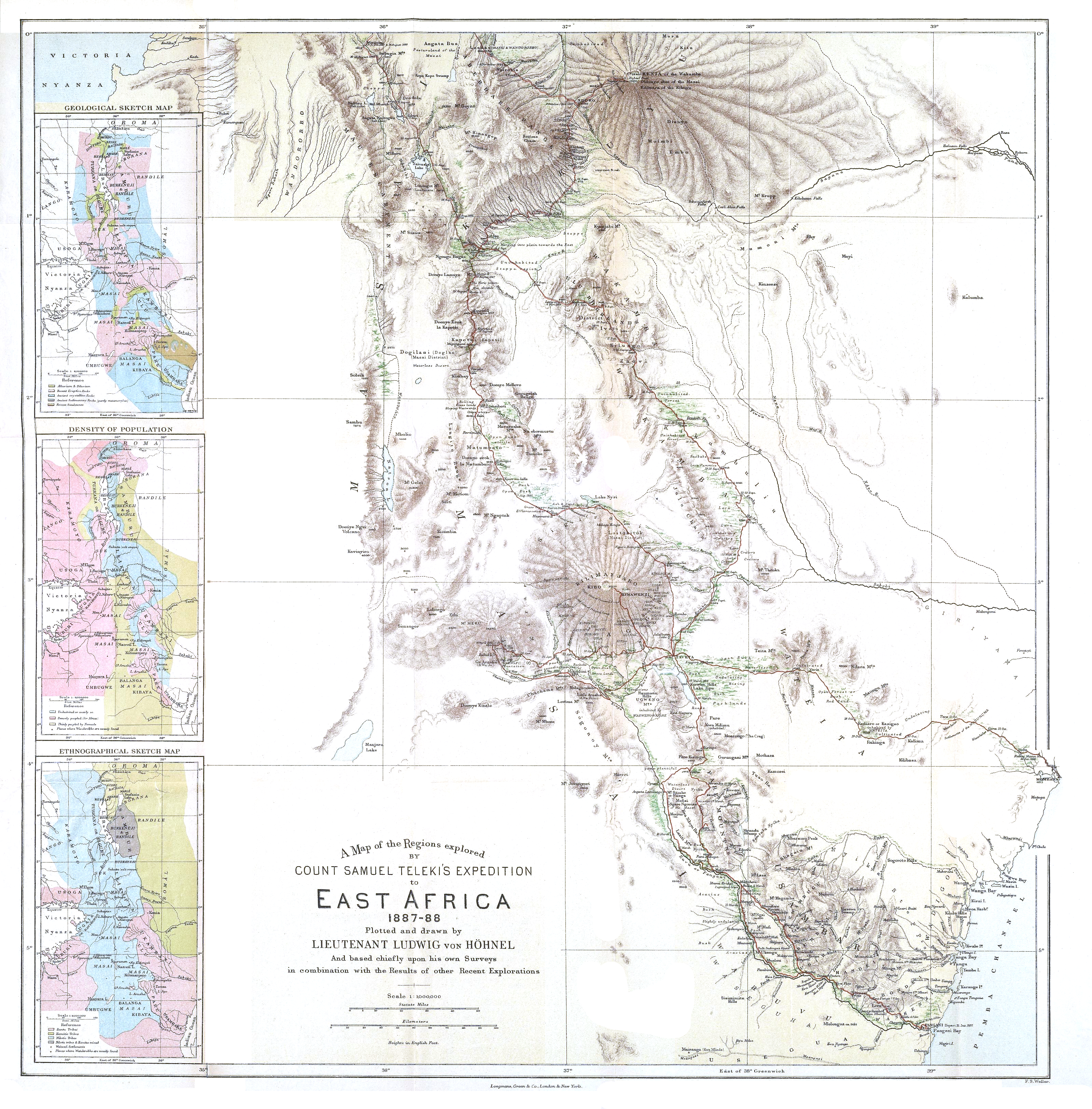
Route of the expedition

Count Teleki and his cartographer companion, Lieutenant Ludwig von Höhnel, an Austrian naval officer from Bratislava, reached Mombasa on 31 October 1886. They began to plan, recruit, and build their team. This included the caravan leaders Dzsumbe Kimemata and Duala Idris. They left Pangani (Tanzania) in February 1887 with around 400 porters, following the Ruvu River. They were the first to survey a great part of the East African Rift. Teleki was the first to reach the snow-line on Mount Kilimanjaro at 5,300 m (17,400 ft), and the first explorer to set foot on Mount Kenya, climbing up to around 4,300 m (14,100 ft). He later headed on northwards, following the interior river system, to see on 5 March 1888 the last of the African Great Lakes, referred to as the Jade Sea by Count Teleki, who named the lake after his friend, Prince Rudolf. Lake Rudolf was renamed Turkana in 1975 after the people that live to the west of its shores. Teleki's and von Höhnel's journey in southern Ethiopia also unveiled a smaller lake, Lake Stefanie (named after Princess Stéphanie of Belgium, the prince's wife), now called Lake Chew Bahir. Though it is commonly stated that he discovered the body of water now referred to as Lake Turkana, the African people living around the lake certainly were aware of it. Even if the meaning of the word "discovery" is taken so as to put that aside, the existence of the lake was known in Europe decades prior to Teleki's expedition. As far back as 1849, Dr. Ludwig Krapf wrote about the Samburu people and his intentions of visiting their lands. A far more direct reference to the lake is found in an 1869 article in the Journal of the Royal Geographical Society. Here, the author, who himself relied on descriptions from African long-distance traders, described a large water body. The article included a detailed map and here, the position, general shape and orientation are a perfect match for Lake Turkana.

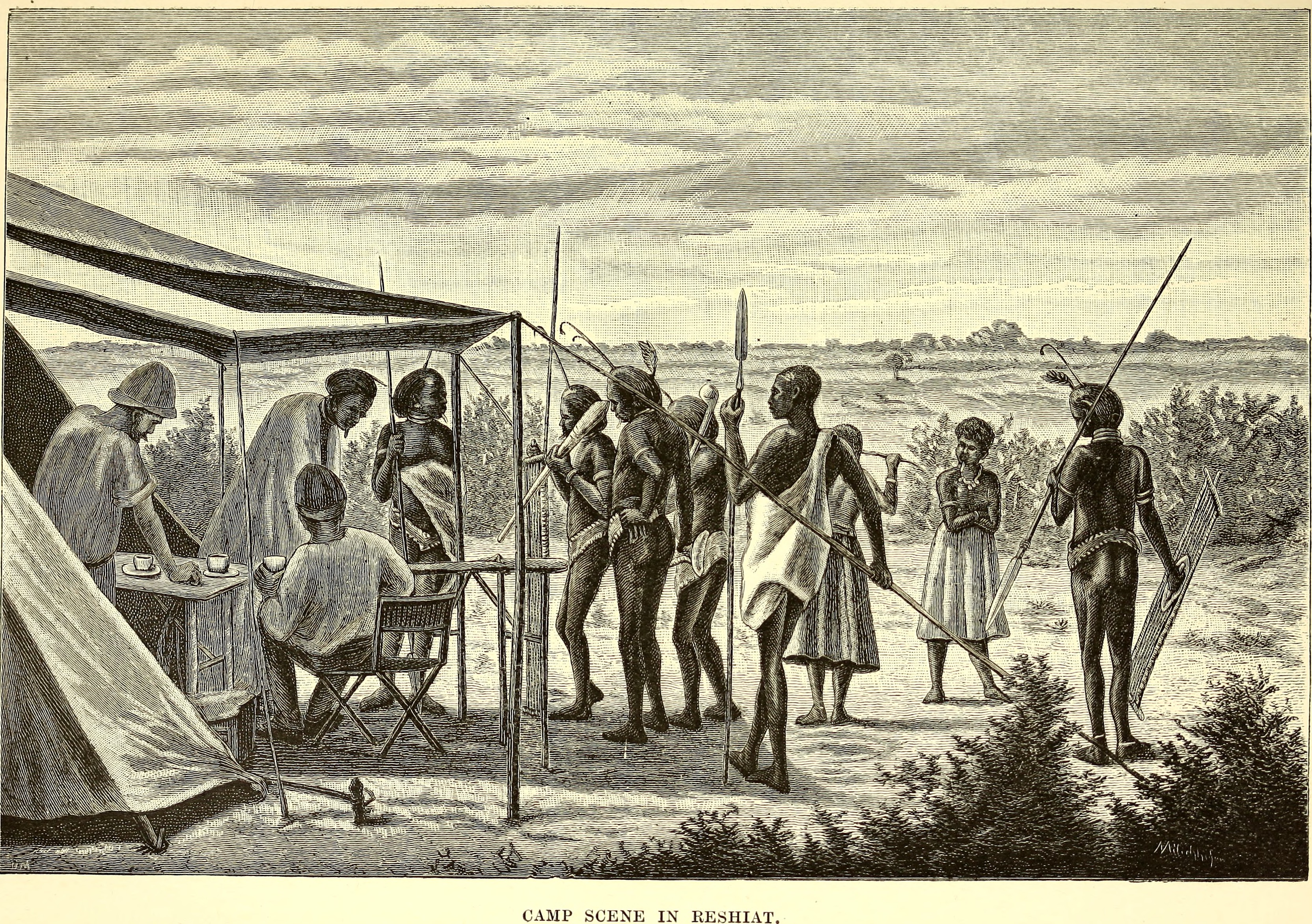
An illustration from the 1894 narrative of the expedition, depicting an encounter between Teleki's party and local inhabitants in East Africa.

The expedition was not without hitches, several native members were killed in hunting accidents, some lost and never seen again. Teleki's men went through Masai land without much incident but they clashed with the Kikuyu people and although peace was attempted, brutal force was used. Teleki had the Kikuyu villages burnt down and many Kikuyu were shot down.

On 20 June 1887, Teleki climbed Mount Kilimanjaro to about 17,387 feet before developing breathing difficulties. His companion Höhnel had dyspnea and was left to stay at a lower elevation. In October 1887 he tried to climb Mount Kenya but cold weather prevented him from reaching the highest peaks. Teleki began his trip with a weight of 238 pounds and returned weighing 157 pounds. For his work he was elected as an honorary member of the Societe Cehdivial de Geographie in 1889.

=== Teleki's volcano ===
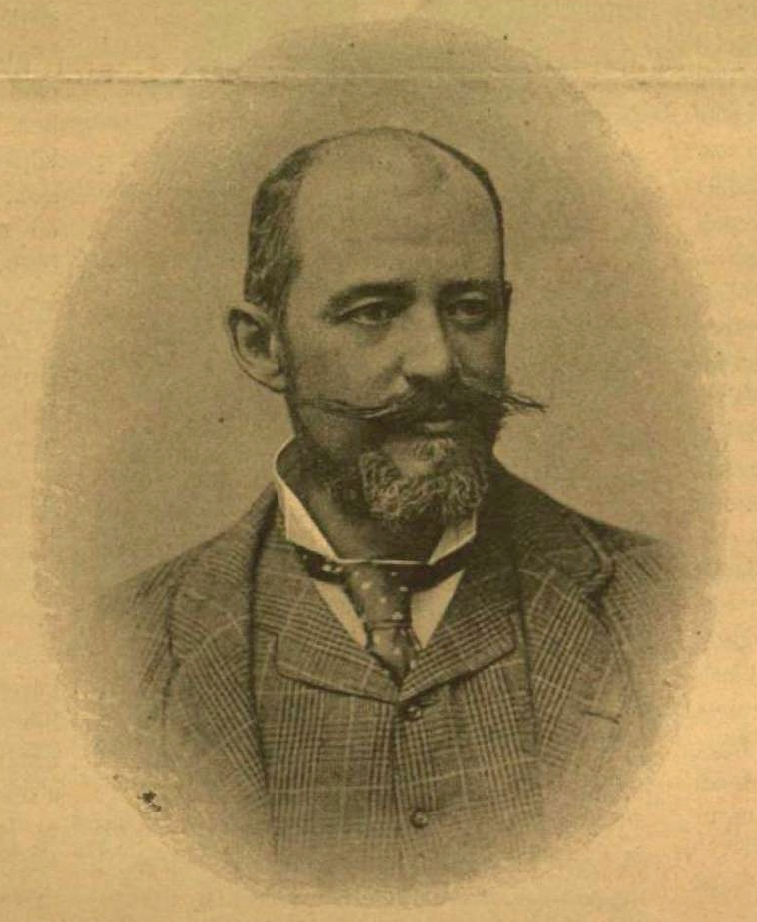
Teleki in 1889

During the return to the East African coast, which they reached at Mombasa in October 1888, along the dry riverbed of the Turkwel, Teleki discovered a 646 m high active volcano in South Kenya. It was called as the Teleki volcano by Höhnel. On their way back, they stopped at Aden whence Teleki apparently intended to explore at a later date the Ethiopian highlands and the great lakes region from the north. In 1895 Teleki was back in Kenya in another unsuccessful effort to climb the Kilimanjaro.

=== Collections ===
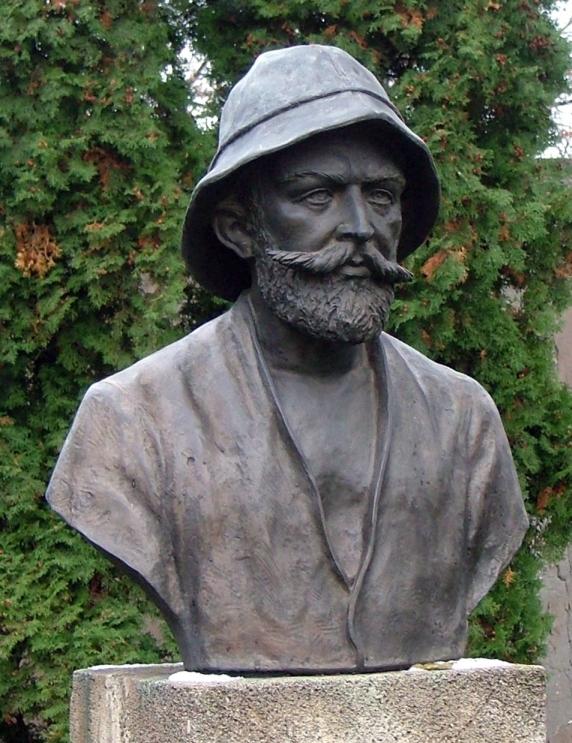
Bust in Wimpffen mansion, Érd, Hungary

Teleki and Höhnel made many observations on the climate, flora and fauna of the territories visited. Nearly 78 new species of plants were described from the 237 plant species they brought back in their collections. Many of the plants were examined by Georg August Schweinfurth (1836–1925) while the mosses, liverworts and lichens were studied respectively by Carl Johann August Müller (1818–1899), Franz Stephani of Leipzig (1842–1927), and Jean Müller Argoviensis (1826–1896). One of the giant Lobelia plants found in the Afro-alpine belt of Mount Kenya is named Lobelia telekii, after Count Teleki. Other species named after him include Dorstenia telekii, Senecio telekii, Lobelia telekii, Erigeron telekii, Conyza telekii, Aeschymomene telekii and Triumfetta telekii. The shot numerous animals including 75 rhino, 72 buffalo and 33 elephants. They also collected more than 400 ethnographical objects, most of them from Maasai and Kikuyu people and brought home a large collection of plant and animal specimens.

== Second expedition (1895) ==
Teleki's second expedition was largely involved in hunting and with the aim of climbing Mount Kilimanjaro. This time he did not bring Ludwig von Höhnel but instead joined the American William Astor Chanler. They started from Mombasa on 6 March 1895 with support from General Lloyd Mathews. He tried to climb Kilimanjaro again but his health and the rainy weather did not allow it. The mountain had already been scaled by Hans Meyer in 1889. Teleki suffered from gout and he was also disappointed by the changes to the area, he found a broad road and the wilderness entirely missing along the route near Samburu. He travelled part way in Uganda with William Ansorge. Teleki shot many animals including rhinos but gave up any prospect of climbing Kilimanjaro due to the rains. He however went to the base and saw the mountain and wrote in his diaries that he "took leave from the snow-covered ancient one like from an old friend I would never see again in my life! And If I were sentimental, I would have cried!".

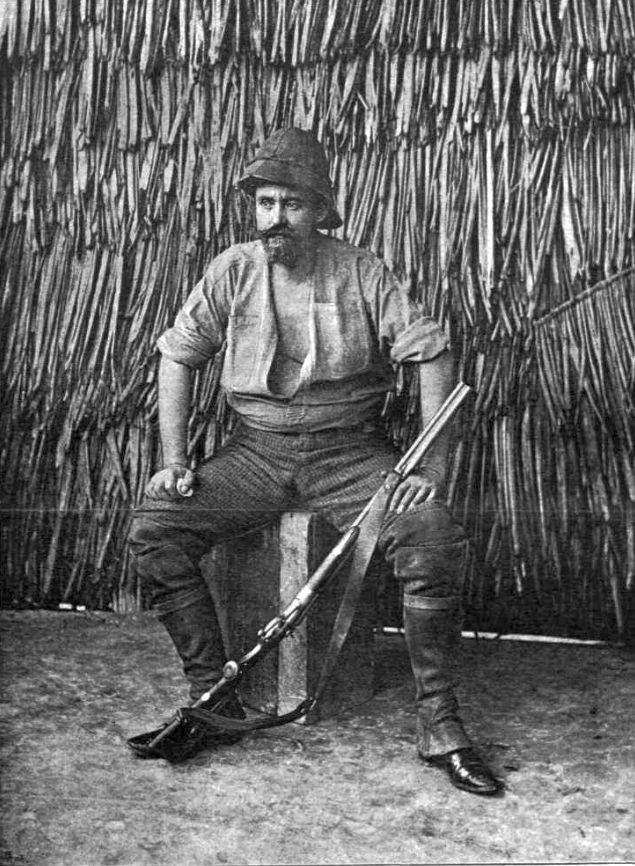
Teleki in Africa

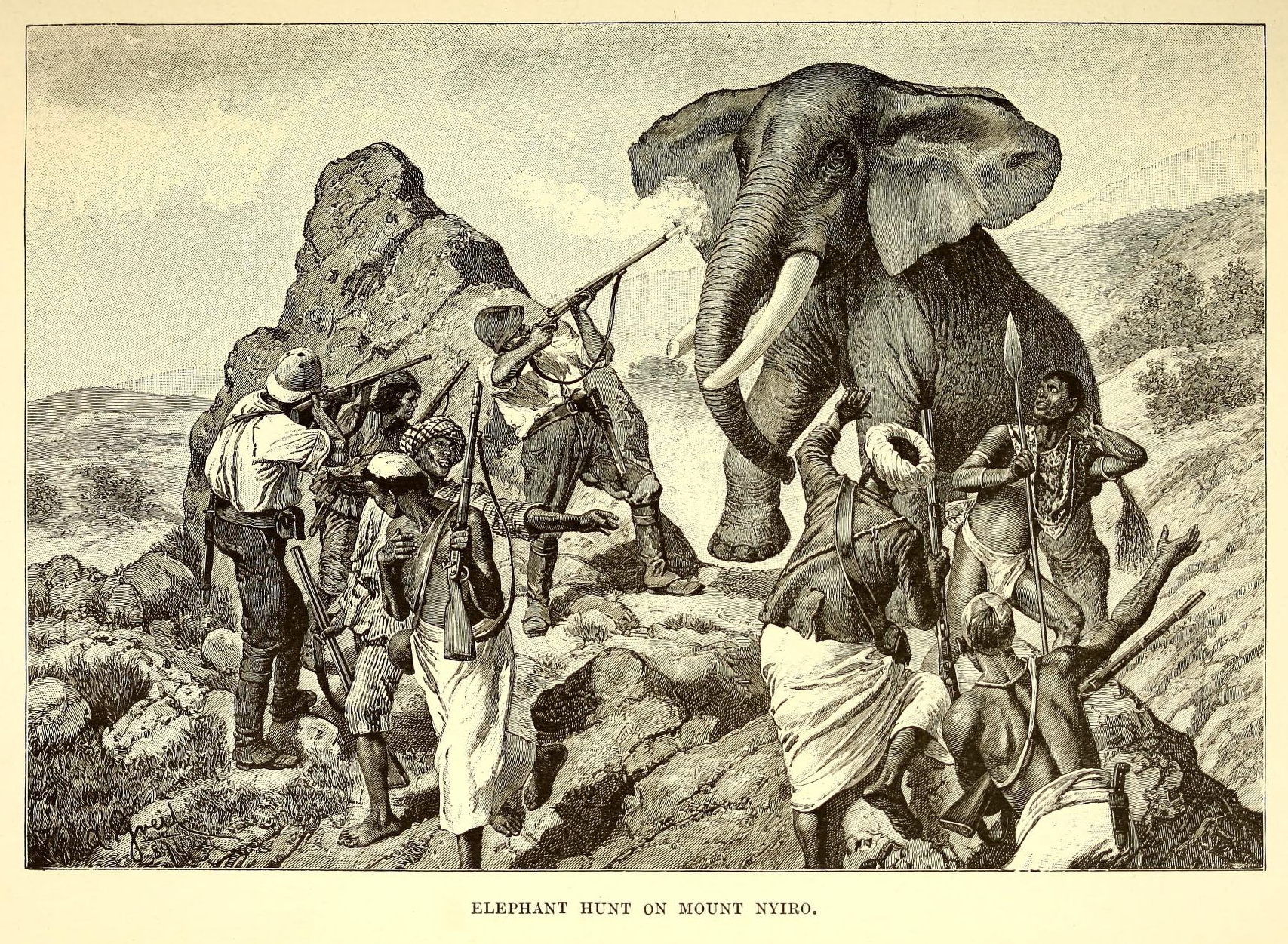
Elephant shooting

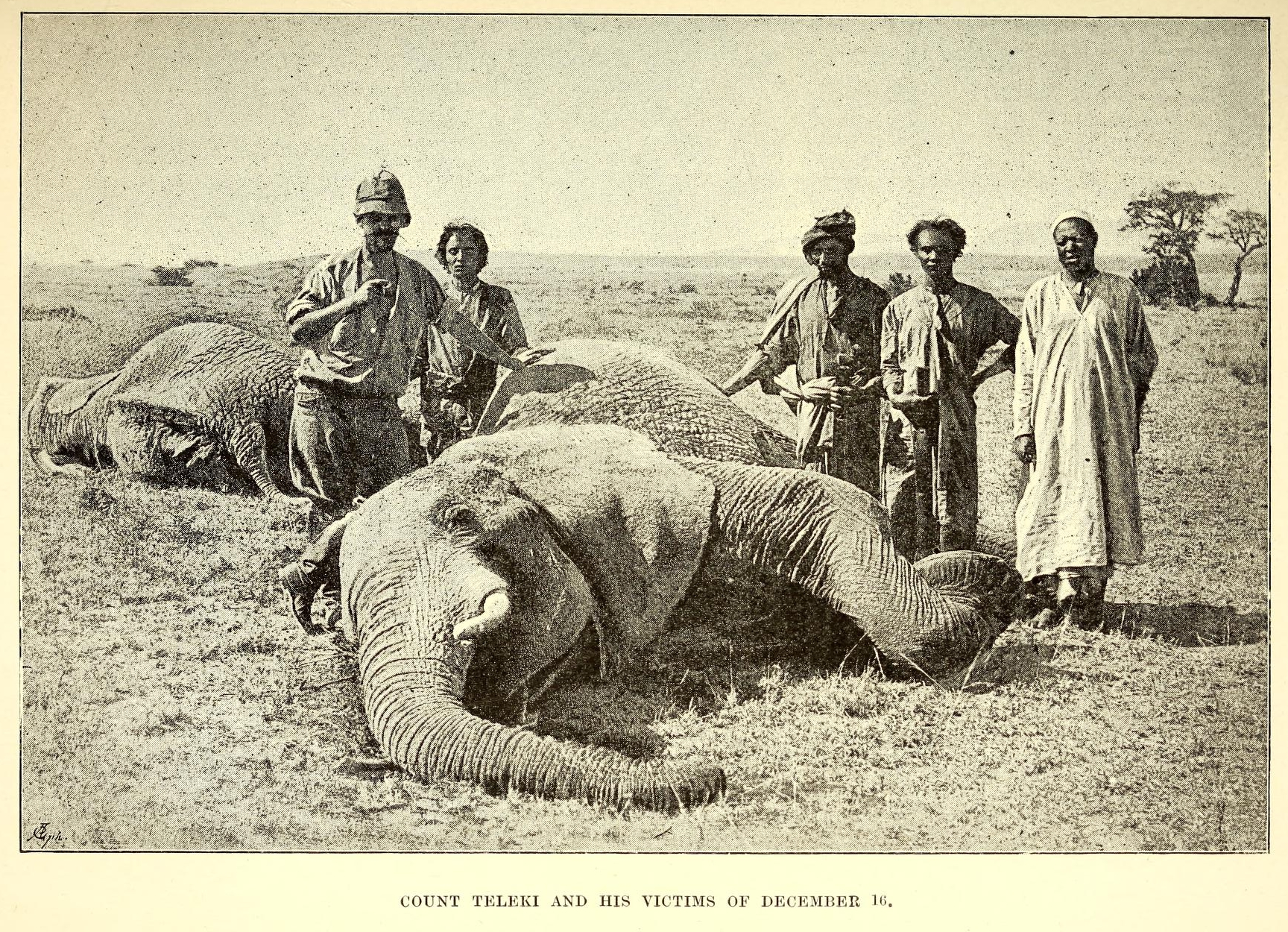
Dead elephants

== East African diaries ==
Teleki wrote "East African diaries", in Hungarian, 1886–95 with English translations. Von Höhnel wrote a report of the expedition entitled The discovery of Lakes Rudolf and Stefanie. His letters home have also been a source of information on ethnology.

After the expedition, Teleki returned to his aristocratic life in Hungary, dying in Budapest after a long illness.
