= Gyula Moór =

Hungarian scientist and politician (1888–1950)

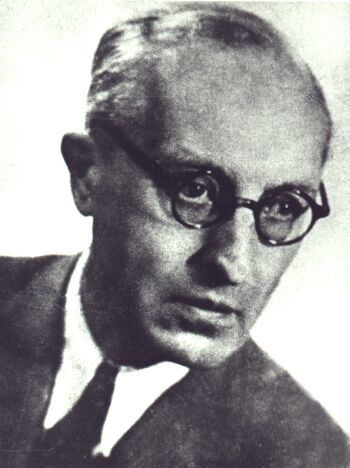
- Born: 11 August 1888; Brassó, Austria-Hungary (today: Brașov, Romania)
- Died: 3 February 1950 (aged 61); Budapest, Hungary
- Awards: Member of Hungarian Academy of Sciences

Gyula Moór (11 August 1888 – 3 February 1950) was a Hungarian jurist, Professor, Member of Parliament and President of the Hungarian Academy of Sciences in 1945 and 1946.

== Sources ==
- Szegedi egyetemi almanach: 1921–1995. Vol. I. (1996). Szeged, (ed. Rezső Mészáros). p. 53. ISBN 963-482-037-9

Cultural offices
Preceded by Gyula Kornis	President of the Hungarian Academy of Sciences; 1945–1946	Succeeded by Zoltán Kodály
