= Teleac =

Teleac may refer to:

== Places ==
- Teleac, a village in Ciugud Commune, Alba County, Romania
- Teleac, a village in Budureasa Commune, Bihor County, Romania
- Teleac, a village in Feliceni Commune, Harghita County, Romania
- Teleac, a village in Gornești Commune, Mureș County, Romania

== Other ==
- Teleac (broadcaster), a former Dutch public educational broadcaster
