= Dániel Bánffy =

Hungarian politician (1893–1955)

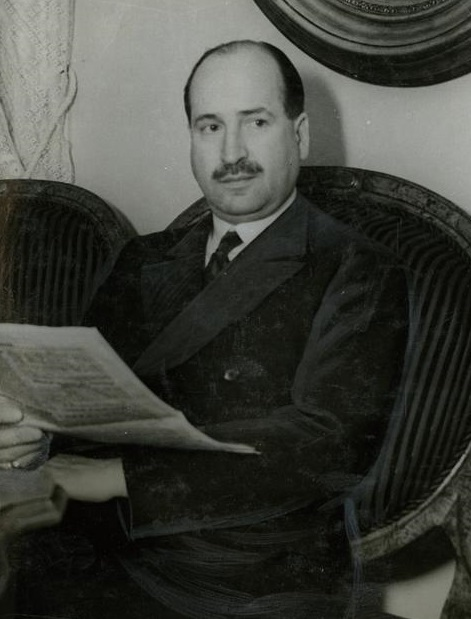

Minister of Agriculture of Hungary
- In office 30 December 1940 – 22 March 1944
- Preceded by: Mihály Teleki
- Succeeded by: Béla Jurcsek

Personal details
- Born: 18 September 1893; Nagyenyed, Kingdom of Hungary, Austria-Hungary
- Died: 7 April 1955 (aged 61); Budapest, People's Republic of Hungary
- Political party: Transylvanian Party
- Profession: politician

Baron Dániel Bánffy de Losoncz (18 September 1893 – 7 April 1955) was a Hungarian politician, who served as Minister of Agriculture between 1940 and 1944.

He farmed in his possessions in Transylvania from 1917 until 1940. In August 1940, the second Vienna Award granted Northern Transylvania to Hungary. Bánffy became a member of the House of Representatives of Hungary as leader of the Transylvanian Party. He served as agriculture minister in the Pál Teleki, László Bárdossy and Miklós Kállay cabinets.

After the Nazi occupation of Hungary he was replaced by Béla Jurcsek. In September 1944, Bánffy demanded immediately binding of the truce in the representation of the Transylvanian interests. He died in Budapest, Hungary.

== Early life ==
Dániel Bánffy was born into a prominent Transylvanian aristocratic family in Nagyenyed (present-day Aiud, Romania) on 18 September 1893, as the son of Baron Kazimir Bánffy (1866–1922) and Mária Pálffy de Tarcsafalva (1868–1941). His grandfather was Baron Dezső Bánffy (1843–1911), who functioned as Speaker of the House of Representatives and Prime Minister of Hungary. Dániel Bánffy had an elder sister Marianna (1891–1966).

He finished his secondary studies at the Lutheran Gymnasium of Sopron. He graduated from the Faculty of Economics of the Franz Joseph University in Kolozsvár (today Cluj-Napoca, Romania). He enlisted in the Austro-Hungarian Army in 1914 and fought in World War I as a lieutenant of the k.u.k 2nd Hussar Regiment. He was seriously injured by losing half of his three fingers in the autumn of 1916, after that he was demobilized. He was awarded Military Merit Medal (or Signum Laudis) and Silver Medal for Bravery 2nd Class.

Bánffy remained in Transylvania following the Treaty of Trianon, when the province was ceded to the Kingdom of Romania. He farmed and managed his extensive estates, including Ciuguzel (Hungarian: Fugad), where he redesigned the Baroque-style mansion, extended by two staircases and one floor. The central heating basement system under the building was also built at this time. Bánffy also built a vacation home for his family in Toplița (Hungarian: Maroshévíz). He handed over the management of the family estates in Cluj County and the forestry and forest production company along the river Mureș by the 1930s. He was secular inspector of the Reformed Diocese of Transylvania too.

== Political career ==
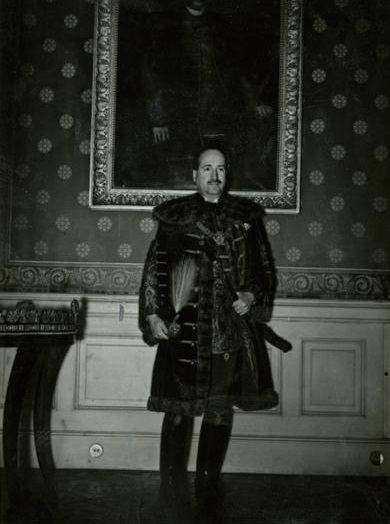
Dániel Bánffy in January 1941

The Second Vienna Award returned the territory of Northern Transylvania – including the majority of the Bánffy estates – from Romania to Hungary in August–September 1940. As one of the representatives of the newly recovered province, Bánffy was delegated to the House of Representatives of Hungary. He was a member of the newly established Transylvanian Party. Prime Minister Pál Teleki appointed him Minister of Agriculture on 30 December 1940, replacing Mihály Teleki. Bánffy was a supporter of the prime minister's revision of land reform in Transylvania.

As minister, Bánffy intended to regulate the river Ier (Ér) in the region Érmellék (Ținutul Ierului) in Northern Transylvania, in order to increase the efficiency of agricultural production. In April 1941, Bánffy objected against Hungary's involvement in the Nazi Invasion of Yugoslavia, citing permanent labor shortage in agriculture due to constant military mobilizations since 1938. Following the suicide of Pál Teleki on 3 April 1941, László Bárdossy was appointed prime minister. Bánffy retained his position in the new cabinet. He strongly opposed Hungary entering the World War II and declare war against the Soviet Union in the summer of 1941, supporting the position of Interior Minister Ferenc Keresztes-Fischer. Thereafter, Bánffy was involved in the anti-war and conservative secret circle, the Hungarian Independence Movement. He tried to minimize Hungarian participation in the war as much as possible, to prevent the flow of Hungarian agricultural products to Germany and to hinder the expansion of German capital in agriculture in Hungary. Bánffy retained his position in the Kállay cabinet too, which formed in 1942.

Following the German occupation of Hungary in March 1944, Bánffy was dismissed from his office along with the entire cabinet. He was arrested by the Gestapo for a brief time on 3 May 1944, but soon he was released after several government party politicians interceded on his behalf. Bánffy became a member of the Transylvanian Hungarian Council (EMT) in August 1944, which aimed to surrender Hungary to the advancing Red Army, opposing the German-backed puppet cabinet. Its leaders Count Béla Teleki and Dániel Bánffy were willing to negotiate with the Soviet and Romanian military authorities on behalf of Northern Transylvania in September 1944. By that time, Bánffy was known as "a leading advocate of an armistice with the Soviet Union". When the Slovak National Uprising broke out, Bánffy and his brother-in-law Count Ladomér Zichy proposed contact with the Soviets through the Slovak partisans. Bánffy supported Regent Miklós Horthy's effort in order to declare an armistice with the Allies and withdrawn from the Axis in October 1944.

== Later life ==
The Nazis overthrew Miklós Horthy and his government following his failed attempt on 15 October 1944. Hungary remained an ally of Germany for the rest of the war. Bánffy was arrested on the same day, when attempted to flee the country to Slovakia. He was held in captivity in Budapest. He was briefly released in early November, but he was again taken custody within days. He was sentenced to death by the Gestapo. He was liberated by resistance members during the Siege of Budapest on 31 December 1944. He survived the siege by hiding in illegality in the following months. The Soviet authorities interrogated him on 25–26 February 1945, but he was released the same day.

Bánffy was excluded from the list of war criminals by the provisional government of Béla Miklós in February 1945, despite the proposal of the Hungarian Communist Party (MKP). Bánffy lost his wealth at the end of the war. He remained in Hungary, after Northern Transylvania was given back to Romania. He was employed as a carrier, but was paralysed in a work accident. In May 1951, Bánffy and his family were interned from Budapest to Jászapáti by the Communist authorities, confiscating their house in Rózsadomb. Meanwhile, Bánffy was sentenced to eight years imprisonment and total confiscation of property in absentia in Romania in 1952. The family was allowed to return to Budapest after the Khrushchev Thaw. Bánffy died there on 7 April 1955, at the age of 61.

== Personal life ==
Bánffy married Linda Atzél in Cluj, Romania on 8 July 1925. They were divorced in 1928. Secondly, he married Mária Huberta Zichy (1906–2001) in Voivodeni on 15 October 1935. Their marriage produced seven children, including Miklós (born 1948), who served as mayor of Leányvár, Hungary from 1991 to 2006.

== Sources ==
- Máthé, Áron (2023). "Báró Bánffy Dániel – a Magyar Függetlenségi Mozgalom támogatója [Baron Dániel Bánffy – A Supporter of the Hungarian Independence Movement]". In Botos, Máté; Fejérdy, Gergely (eds.). Honore et Virtute. A közép-európai arisztokrácia sorsa a XX. században (in Hungarian). L'Harmattan. pp. 121–139. ISBN 978-963-414-829-6.

Political offices
Preceded by Mihály Teleki	Minister of Agriculture; 1940–1944	Succeeded by Béla Jurcsek
