= Mihály Teleki (politician, born 1896) =

Hungarian politician (1896–1991)

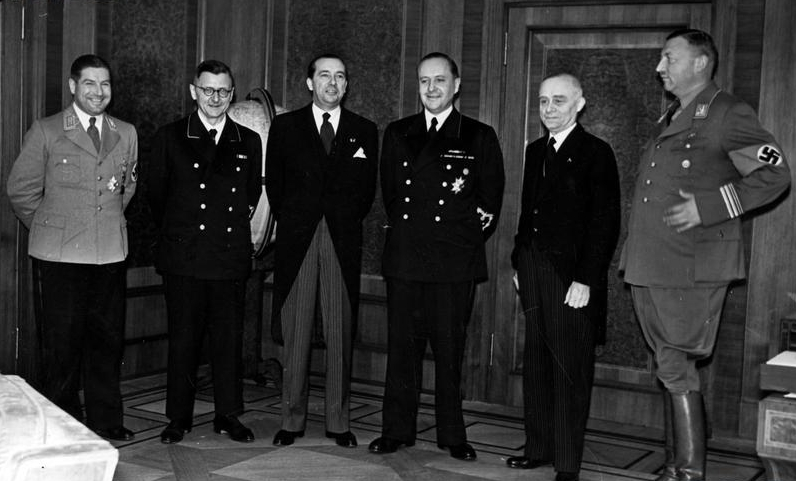
- Teleki (third from L) with Walter Darre (fourth) and Döme Sztójay (fifth) in 1940

Minister of Agriculture of Hungary
- In office 15 November 1938 – 30 December 1940
- Preceded by: Sándor Sztranyavszky
- Succeeded by: Dániel Bánffy

Personal details
- Born: 20 April 1896 Budapest, Kingdom of Hungary, Austria-Hungary
- Died: 20 August 1991 (aged 95) London, United Kingdom
- Party: Party of National Unity, Party of Hungarian Life
- Profession: politician

Count Mihály Teleki de Szék (20 April 1896 – 20 August 1991) was a Hungarian politician, who served as Minister of Agriculture between 1938 and 1940. After the Nazi occupation of Hungary he was the chairman of the governing Party of Hungarian Life. Teleki lived in emigration since 1945. He died in London, England at the age of 95.

Political offices
Preceded by Sándor Sztranyavszky	Minister of Agriculture; 1938–1940	Succeeded by Dániel Bánffy
