= Gornești =

Gornești Gernyeszeg
- Commune
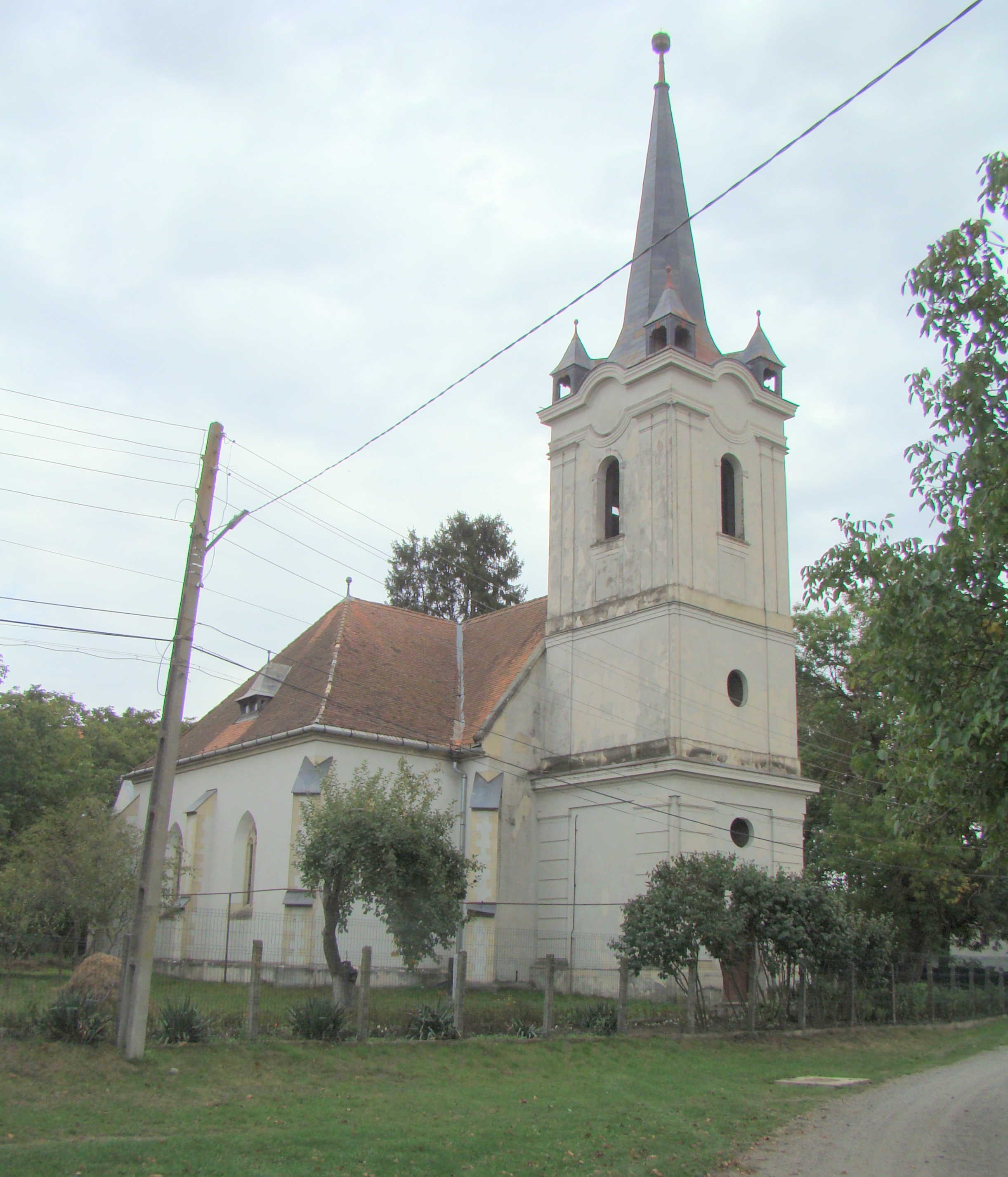
- Reformed church in Gornești

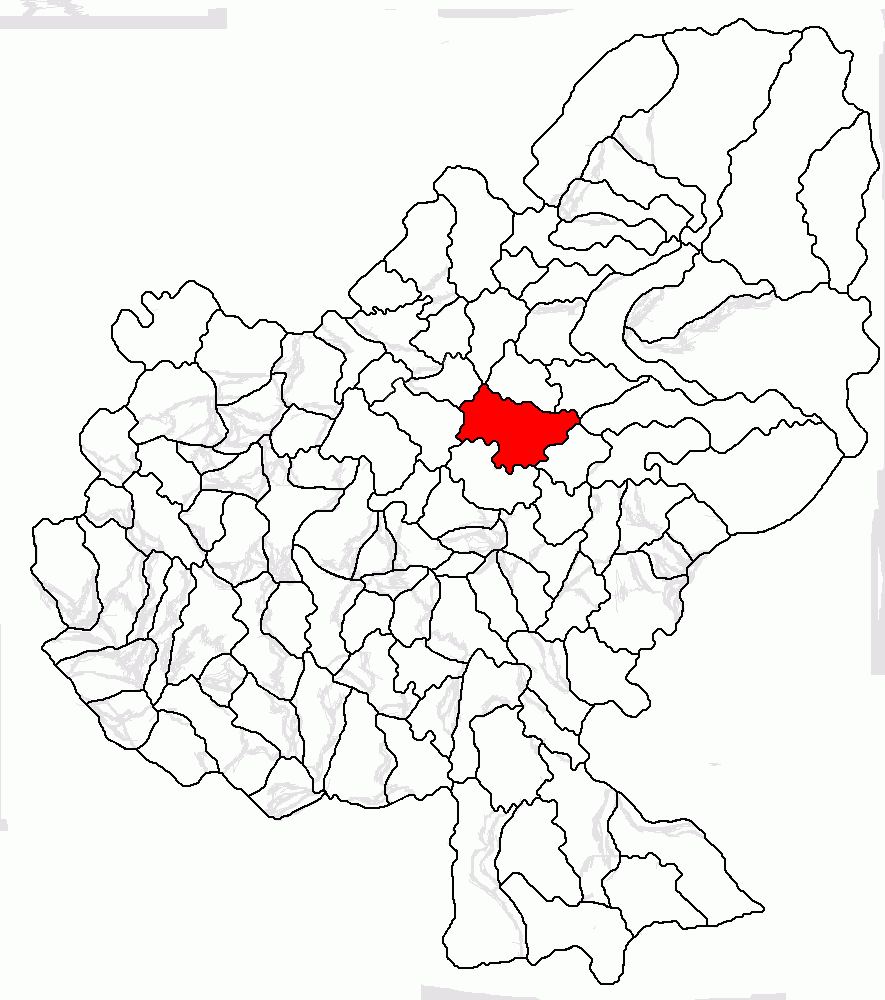
- Location in Mureș County

- Location in Romania
- Coordinates: 46°40′N 24°39′E
- Country: Romania
- County: Mureș

Government
  - Mayor (2020–2024): Gyula Kolcsár (UDMR)
- Area: 54.39 km^{2} (21.00 sq mi)
- Elevation: 340 m (1,120 ft)
- Population (2021-12-01): 5,072
  - Density: 93.25/km^{2} (241.5/sq mi)
- Time zone: UTC+02:00 (EET)
  - Summer (DST): UTC+03:00 (EEST)
- Postal code: 547280
- Area code: (+40) 02 65
- Vehicle reg.: MS
- Website: primariagornesti.ro

Gornești (formerly Ghernesig; Hungarian: Gernyeszeg, Hungarian pronunciation: [ˈɡɛrɲɛsɛɡ]) is a commune in Mureș County, Transylvania, Romania composed of nine villages: Gornești, Iara de Mureș (Marosjára), Ilioara (Kisillye), Mura Mare (Nagyszederjes), Mura Mică (Kisszederjes), Pădureni (Erdőcsinád), Periș (Körtvélyfája), Petrilaca de Mureș (Magyarpéterlaka), and Teleac (Marostelek).

== Geography ==
Gornești lies on the Transylvanian Plateau, on the left bank of the Mureș River. Located in the central part of the county, it is crossed by national road DN15, which connects it to the county seat, Târgu Mureș, 19 km (12 mi) to the south, and to Reghin, 14 km (8.7 mi) to the north.

== History ==
The commune formed part of the Székely Land region of the historical Transylvania province. Until 1918, it belonged to the Maros-Torda County of the Kingdom of Hungary. After the Hungarian–Romanian War of 1919 and the Treaty of Trianon of 1920, it became part of Romania.

== Demographics ==
Gornești has an absolute Hungarian majority. According to the 2011 census, it had a population of 5,577, of which 71.9% were Hungarians, 18.5% Romanians, and 9.5% Roma. At the 2021 census, the commune had 5,072 inhabitants; of those, 69.28% were Hungarians, 15.18% Romanians, and 8.28% Roma.

== Natives ==
- István Bethlen (1874–1946), aristocrat and statesman, Prime Minister of Hungary from 1921 to 1931
- Sámuel Teleki (1739–1822), Chancellor of Transylvania, famous book collector
- Alexandru Todea (1912–2002), Greek-Catholic bishop of the Alba Iulia Diocese and later cardinal

== Economy ==
The Teleac gas field is located on the territory of the commune; it was discovered in 1915 and began production in 1930.

== See also ==
- List of Hungarian exonyms (Mureș County)
