= Sámuel Teleki (chancellor) =

Chancellor of Transylvania

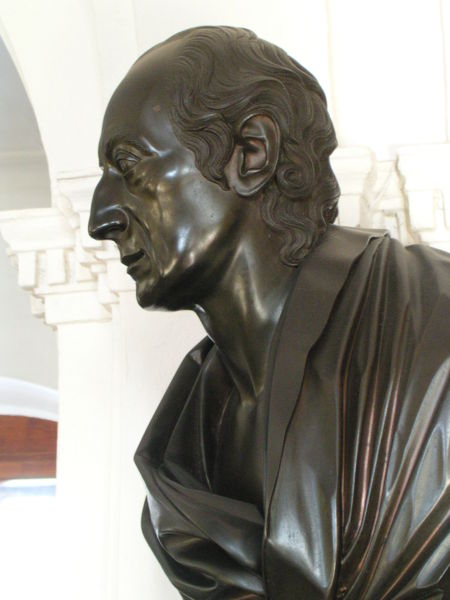
Statue of Sámuel Teleki at the Teleki Library in Târgu Mureș.

Count Sámuel Teleki de Szék (17 November 1739, Gornești – 7 August 1822, Vienna), Chancellor of Transylvania, book collector, and founder of the Teleki Library in Târgu Mureș (Marosvásárhely), Transylvania. He was the great-grandfather of the explorer Sámuel Teleki.

== Biography ==
Count Sámuel Teleki de Szék was born in the village of Gernyeszeg, Principality of Transylvania (now Gornești, Mureș County, Romania) on 17 November 1739. A crucial time of his years of preparation was the four-year study tour he performed in Europe (1759–1763), the most important stops of which were in Basel, Utrecht, Leiden, and Paris. His impressions triggered the idea to found a library; few people knew more about books at the time.

During his university years, he made up a well-devised plan to build out a book-supplying network. Arriving home he settled on his Sáromberke estate near the village in which he was born. This is where he started his activity toward the reformation of Transylvanian Protestant public education. He funded scientific and cultural activities, provided financial aid for writers, scholars as well as Transylvanian students studying abroad. After twenty years of intensive research, in 1784 he published the most complete edition of Janus Pannonius’ works.

He entered public service in 1774 as Lord-Lieutenant of Küküllő County and later of Bihar County. In 1787, he was summoned to Vienna and appointed Chancellor-Assistant of Transylvania by Emperor Joseph II. From 1791 until his death, Sámuel Teleki was Chancellor of Transylvania. Teleki's moving to Vienna brought him closer to the European book-trade and diversified his sources of supply. According to the accounts and book orders available, Teleki purchased books from as many as twenty-five European cities. During six decades of systematic collection, Teleki managed to acquire many significant works published since the advent of printing.

Sámuel Teleki died in Vienna, on 7 August 1822. He was buried in Sáromberke (today Dumbrăvioara), in the family crypt.
