= Teleki Library =

Museum and library in Romania

Coordinates: 46°32′34″N 24°33′56″E

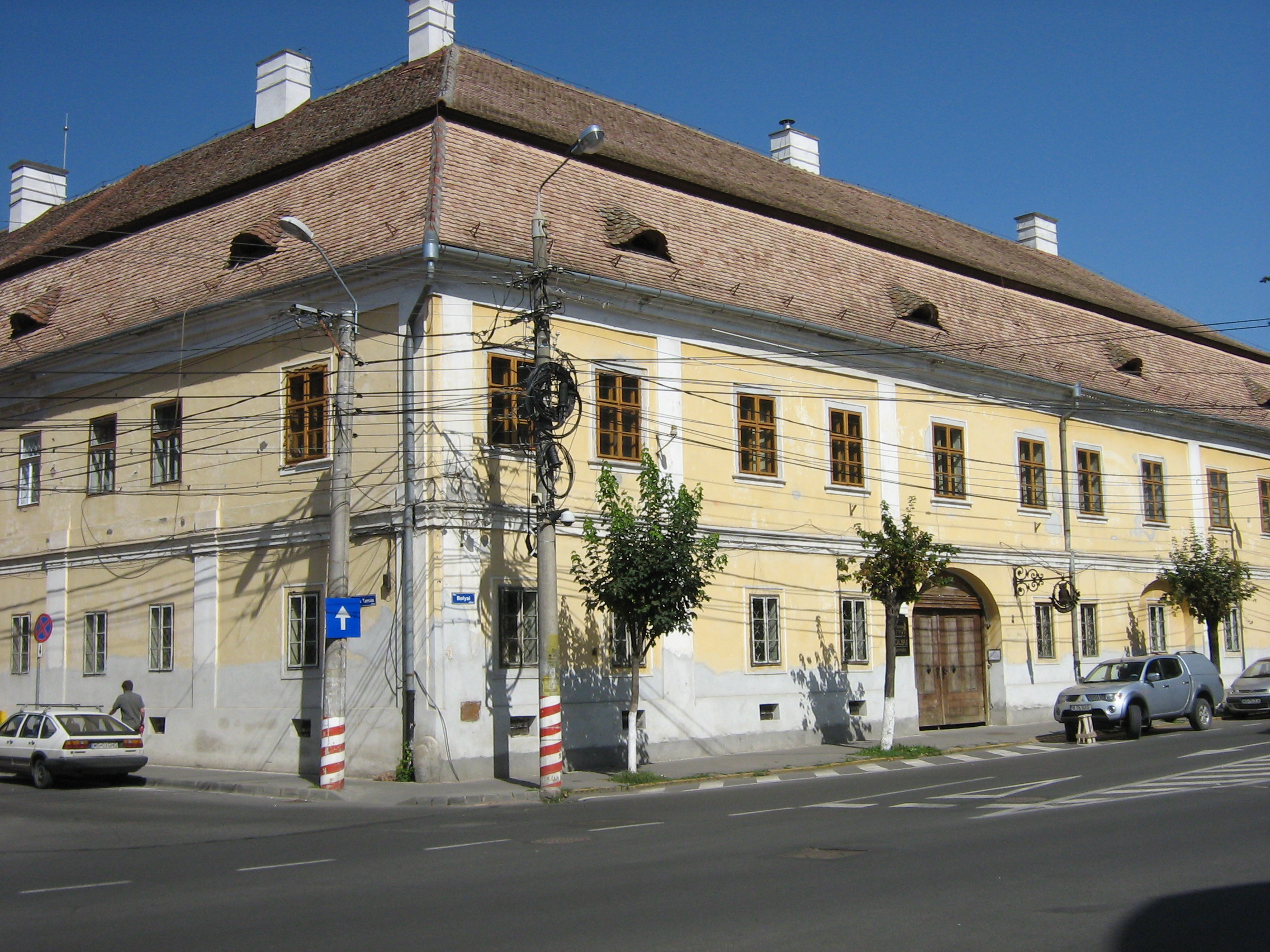
- Location: Târgu Mureș
- Established: 1802
- Branches: N/A

Collection
- Size: 200,000 catalogued books: 40,000 from Teleki heritage, 80,000 from Reformed College, collections of monastery, churches and schools

Access and use
- Circulation: Library and Bolyai Museum is publicly circulate

Other information
- Director: Klára Lázok
- Website: www.telekiteka.ro

The Teleki Library (Hungarian: Teleki Téka, Romanian: Biblioteca Teleki-Bolyai), also known as Teleki-Bolyai Library and Bibliotheca Telekiana, is a historic public library and current museum in Târgu-Mureș, Romania. One of the richest Transylvanian collections of cultural artefacts, it was founded by the Hungarian Count Sámuel Teleki in 1802, at the time when Transylvania was part of the Habsburg monarchy, and has been open to the reading public ever since. It was among the first institutions of its kind in the Kingdom of Hungary.

It houses over 200,000 volumes, of which many are rarities, constituting a comprehensive scientific database. The book collection is divided into several smaller libraries, of which the two main donations are the original 40,000-volume Teleki Library and the 80,000-volume Bolyai Library; the rest, grouped as the Miscellaneous Collection, is made up of several private libraries, volumes previously held by religious schools and those of a Franciscan monastery. Overall, the library constitutes a collection of most traditional types of Transylvanian book.

== History ==
Its founder, Count Sámuel Teleki de Szék (1739–1822) was one of the most learned book collectors of the time. From the very beginning, he intended his collection as a public library, and developed it throughout his life; he remained a committed and active bibliophile despite his time-consuming administrative career — he was Chancellor of Transylvania from 1791 until his death — building on his relations with all important European printing and publishing houses, and purchasing all important works published between the invention of the movable type and the early 19th century.

In order to publicize his library, Teleki compiled and published a four-volume catalogue (Vienna, 1796–1819), divided according to general topics. Teleki's own instructions concerning the operation of the library are also presented in the catalogue (Volume II).

Teleki inherited the 17-18th century Baroque building in which the library is housed from the Wesselényi family. Inside the wing built between the years 1799 and 1802, books are still stored in accordance to the original guidelines.

According to the surviving accounts of the librarians, which contain the names and professions of the readers, as well as the authors and titles of the books read, the facility was attended by a sizable portion of the 6,000-7,000 citizens Târgu-Mureș had at the time. It provided them access to European scientific life and to Age of Enlightenment ideas.

Upon his death, Sámuel Teleki left the library to his heirs as an entailed property; they were bound to keep the library open and running and were supervised by the High Board of the Reformed Church. Nevertheless, book acquisition became unsystematic soon after his death. For the following century, the Bibliotheca Telekiana was more of a book museum than a library. It was only towards the end of the 19th century that systematic research was initiated.

In 1951, the Library was nationalized by the Communist regime, and, in 1955, the Teachers' Library of the Protestant College (now known as the Bolyai Library) was moved into the building (the two collections merged under the name of Teleki-Bolyai Library). In 1974, the unified collection has become a branch of the Mureș County Library.

Today, the continuously growing book collection is focused on scientific subjects, specialising in history, local history, cultural history, and social sciences. On an average, 100 – 150 people use the Reading Room and the museum is visited by thousands of tourists a year.

== See also ==
- List of libraries in Romania

== References and Bibliography ==
- Deé Nagy Anikó: A könyvtáralapító Teleki Sámuel. In: KSz, 1973/2, 75–79.
- Spielmann József, Deé Nagy Anikó, Spielmann Mihály: Servetus's Christianismi Restitutio and Transylvania. In: Harvard Library Bulletin. Cambridge, Massachusetts. 31. (1983) 1. sz. 52–63.
