= Miklós Kállay =

Hungarian politician (1887–1967)

Noble Miklós Kállay de Nagykálló
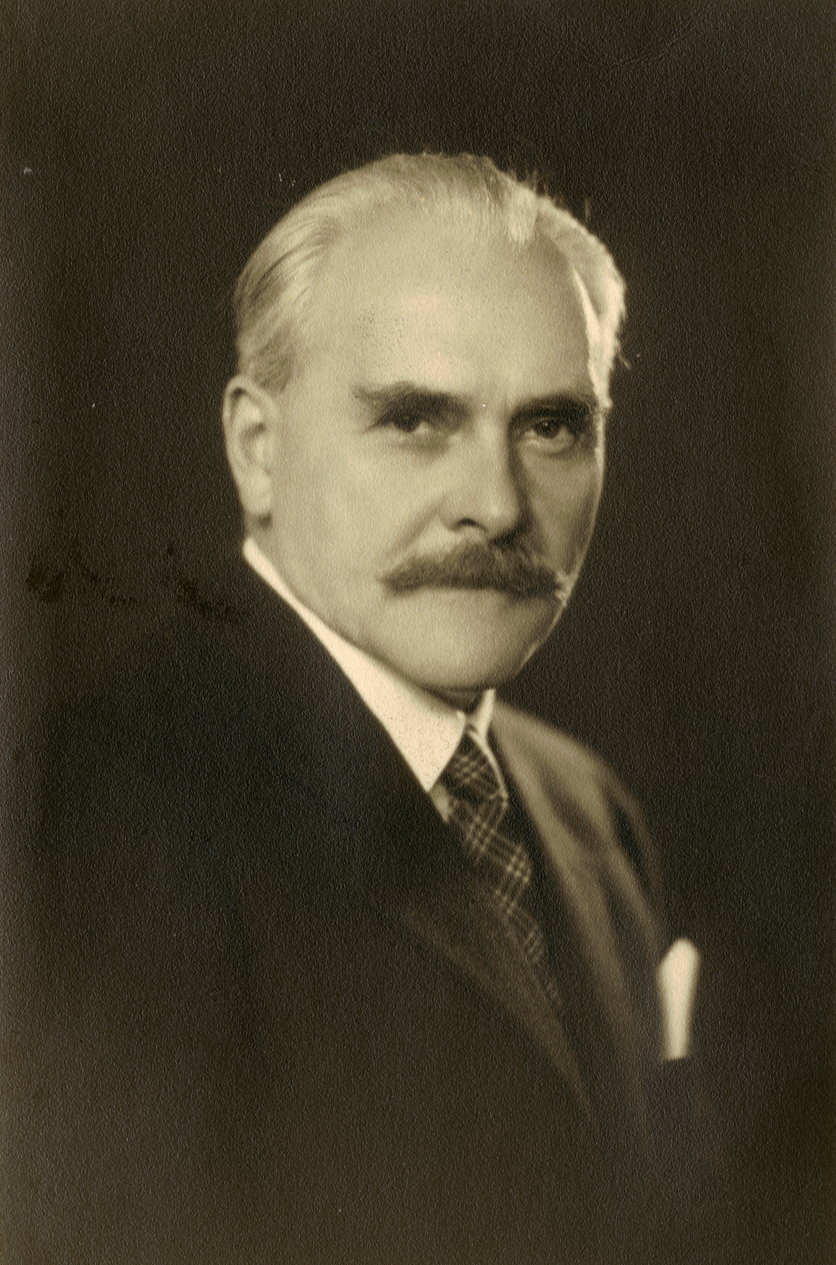
- Official portrait, 1941

Prime Minister of Hungary
- In office 9 March 1942 – 22 March 1944
- Regent: Miklós Horthy
- Preceded by: László Bárdossy
- Succeeded by: Döme Sztójay

Personal details
- Born: 23 January 1887 Nyíregyháza, Austria-Hungary
- Died: 14 January 1967 (aged 79) New York City, New York, United States
- Party: Unity Party/Party of National Unity (1929–1935); Independent (1935–1939); Party of Hungarian Life
- Spouse(s): Helén Kállay (1914–1945); Márta Fényes de Csokaly
- Children: Kristóf; Miklós; András
- Parent(s): András Kállay de Nagykálló; Vilma Csuha de Eördöghfalva
- Profession: Politician

Miklós Kállay de Nagykálló (23 January 1887 – 14 January 1967) was a Hungarian politician who served as Prime Minister of Hungary during World War II, from 9 March 1942 to 22 March 1944. By early 1942, Hungarian Regent Admiral Miklós Horthy was seeking to put some distance between himself and Hitler's regime. He dismissed the pro-German prime minister, László Bárdossy, and replaced him with Kállay, a moderate whom Horthy expected to loosen Hungary's ties to Germany.

Kállay successfully protected refugees and prisoners, resisted Nazi pressure regarding Jews, established contact with the Allies and negotiated conditions under which Hungary would switch sides against Germany. However, the Allies were not close enough. When the Germans occupied Hungary in March 1944, Kállay went into hiding. He was finally captured by the Nazis but was liberated when the war ended. He went into exile in 1946 and died two decades later in New York City.

== Early life and career ==
The Kállay family was old and influential among the local gentry of their region, and Miklós served as lord-lieutenant (ispán) of his county from 1921 to 1929. The British historian C.A Macartney who knew Kállay well described him as "a Kállay of Szabolcs County and that itself to any Hungarian was a characterisation. Szabloces County, on the left bank of the middle Tiza, had always been one of the most Hungarian parts of all Hungary. If Szabolcs might be called the quintessence of Hungary and the Kállays of Szabloces, Miklós Kállay was the quintessence of the Kállays". The main dividing line in Hungarian politics in the interwar era was not between left and right for the left had been effectively stamped out after the failure of the Hungarian Soviet Republic in 1919. The Hungarian Communist Party had been banned while the Social Democratic Party was barely tolerated. Rather, the main dividing was within the right between a right-wing faction known as the conservatives vs. an more right-wing faction known as the radicals. The dispute extended into the Hungarian state with the radicals controlling the ministries of defense, industry and finance while the conservatives controlled the ministries of the interior and agriculture. The ministries of foreign affairs and justice tended to alternate between the conservatives and the radicals. Kállay was associated with the conservatives.

Kállay then moved on to national government and served first as deputy under secretary of state for the Ministry of Trade (1929–1931) and later as minister of agriculture (1932–1935). In 1932, the radical Gyula Gömbös was appointed prime minister. Gömbös's long-time rival, the conservative former prime minister Count István Bethlen wanted to limit Gömbös's room to maneuver as prime minister and had several of his allies appointed to Gömbös cabinet with the express purpose of keeping Gömbös in line. Allies of Bethlen such as Ferenc Keresztes-Fischer served as Gömbös's Interior minister while Kállay served as Gömbös's Agriculture minister. In a mostly rural country, Kállay's portfolio as Agriculture minister gave him much power, and Kállay's purpose was to block any land reform. Gömbös liked to present himself as a populist right-winger, the champion of the "little guy" and as a reformer battling a corrupt system. Gömbös had sometimes talked about a land reform as a way of winning popular support, a position which was anathema to Bethlen who was implacably any land reform that might weaken the power of the aristocracy. Kállay resigned in 1935 in protest over the right-wing policies of Prime Minister Gyula Gömbös. He kept out of politics for most of the next decade before Hungarian Regent Admiral Miklós Horthy asked him to form a government to reverse the pro-Nazi policies of László Bárdossy in March 1942. In August 1941 as a member of the Upper House, Kállay voted against the Third Anti-Jewish law that had been by the Bárdossy government that had banned marriage and sex between Hungarian Gentiles and Jews.

In January 1942 during a shooting party outside of Budapest during the visit of the German Foreign Minister Joachim von Ribbentrop, Kállay had impressed Horthy by arguing with Ribbentrop. Horthy praised Kállay, saying "that is the way to talk to the Germans". In early March 1942, Horthy summoned Kállay to a meeting at the Royal Castle in Budapest, saying he was disappointed with Bárdossy, whom he complained tended to present him with one fait accompli after another, and wanted a prime minister who would more be respectful of his position as regent. Horthy also complained that Bárdossy was trying to fire the conservative Ferenc Keresztes-Fischer as Interior Minister in order to replace him with a radical, which Horthy was opposed to as the Interior Ministry controlled both the State Police and the Royal Hungarian Gendarmerie.

Kállay described himself as a follower of the former Prime Minister Pál Teleki, which led him at first to decline the offer, saying "if Teleki had found no way except suicide of remaining true to his principles, how could one follow this policy now, with Bárdossy's four wars on one's back?" To entice him to serve, Horthy promised Kállay that as prime minister, he would have complete freedom to appoint his own cabinet except for the Defense Minister Károly Bartha whom Horthy wanted to see continue on, and that Kállay would be allowed to serve as prime minister for the long term. As the "Supreme War Lord" and as a former admiral in the Imperial Austrian and Royal Hungarian Navy, Horthy had insisted upon having exclusive control over military affairs, telling Kállay as a prime minister he would have control over everything except for the military. Horthy also committed himself to dissolving Parliament for new elections in the event of any difficulties within the ruling MEP (Magyar Élet Pártja-Party of Hungarian Life). Not since the time of István Bethlen who had served as prime minister between 1921–1931 had Horthy allowed a prime minister such latitude to make policy as he offered to Kállay.

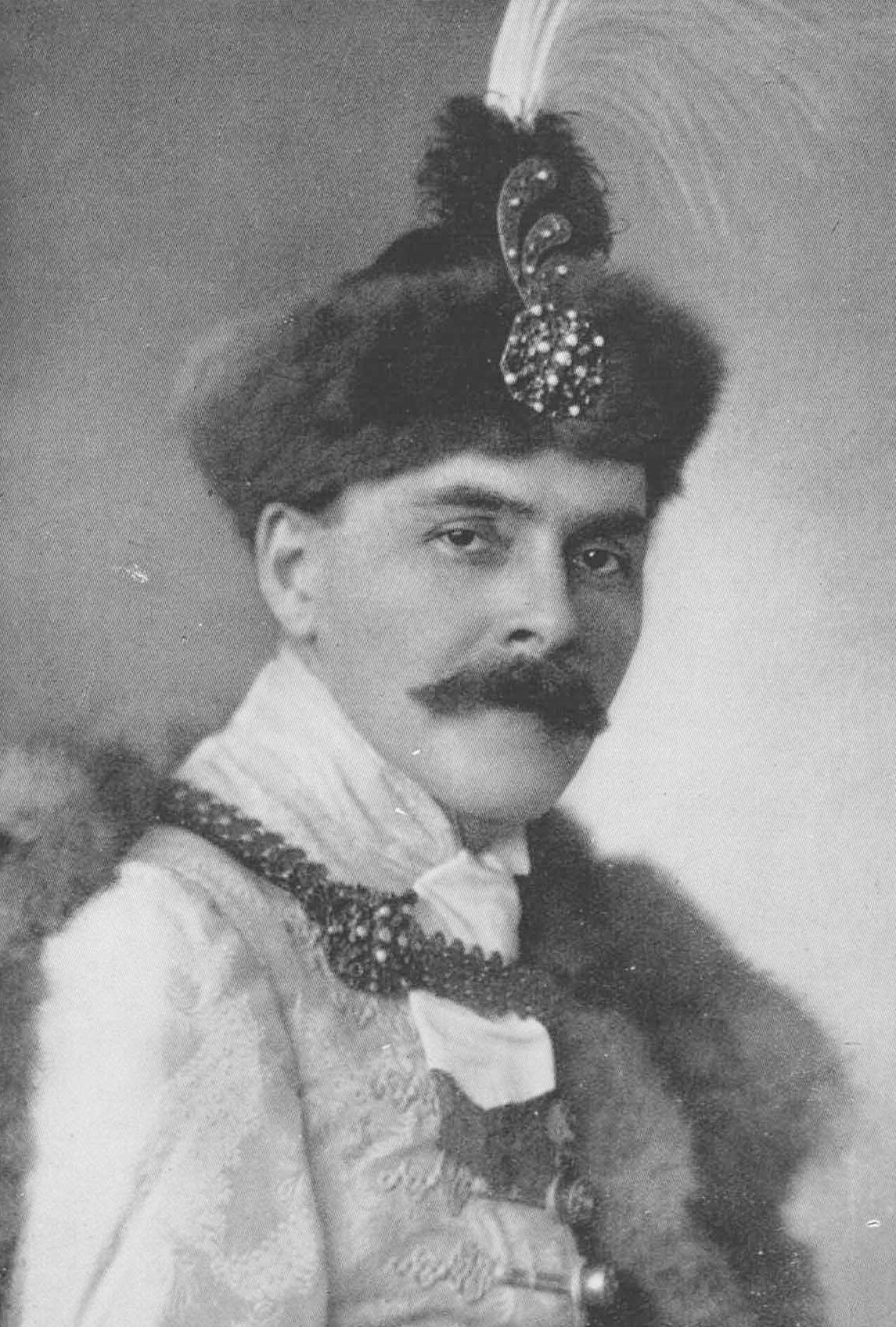
Kállay in 1920 wearing the traditional uniform of a Magyar nobleman.

== Prime minister ==
The German minister-plenipotentiary in Budapest, Dietrich von Jagow reported to Berlin: "Kállay is basically an apolitical person and has not been active in the last few years either in internal or foreign affairs. National Socialism is an "alien" concept to him and he bears no inner sympathy with it. Nevertheless he will no doubt continue the same relations with Germany as his successor". Jagow reported to Berlin that Kállay in his first speech as prime minister on 19 March 1942 described the war against the Soviet Union as "our war" and ordered a police crackdown on the Hungarian Social Democrats, sending hundreds of Jewish Social Democrats to the dreaded Labor Service of the Royal Hungarian Army where conditions were extremely harsh. In his speech, Kállay declared his support for the war on the Eastern Front"to shield Christianity against the Asiatic danger of Bolshevism". Jagow described Kállay in his reports to Ribbentrop as a proponent of what was known in Hungary as "civilized antisemitism" who favored social exclusion and discrimination as the solution to the "Jewish Question", but who deeply deplored violence. Dr. Josef Goebbels, the German Propaganda Minister by contrast complained in his diary that Kállay was a noted Anglophile and his government "fitted into the Axis like a fist into the eye". The Hungarian-American historian Randolph L. Braham described Kállay's appointment as prime minister as a break from the pro-Nazi line pursued by Bardossy to the more cautiously Anglophile line pursued by Teleki.

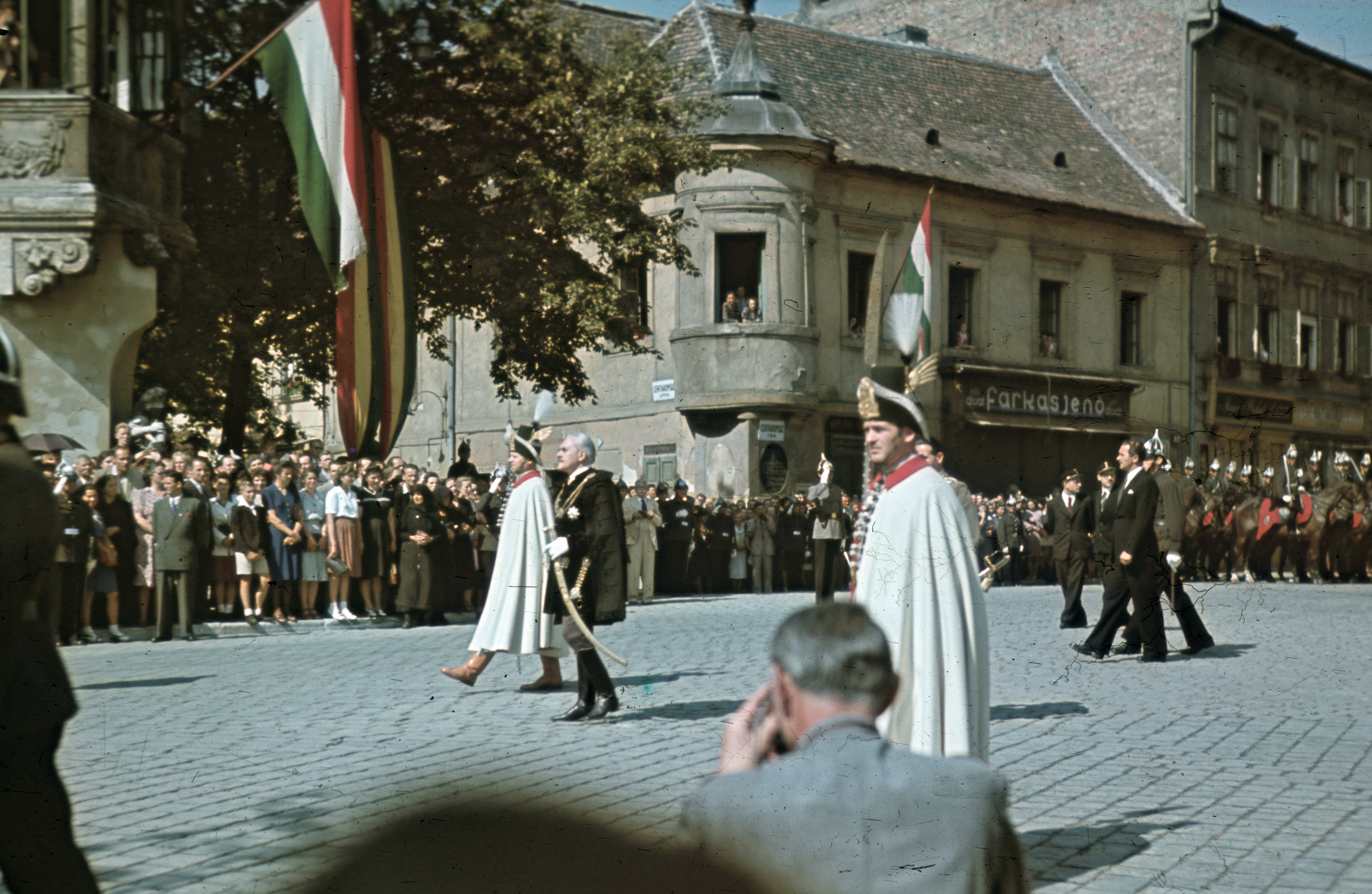
Prime Minister Miklós Kállay in procession on Holy Trinity Square, along Holy Trinity Street, Buda Castle. 1943. Fortepan.

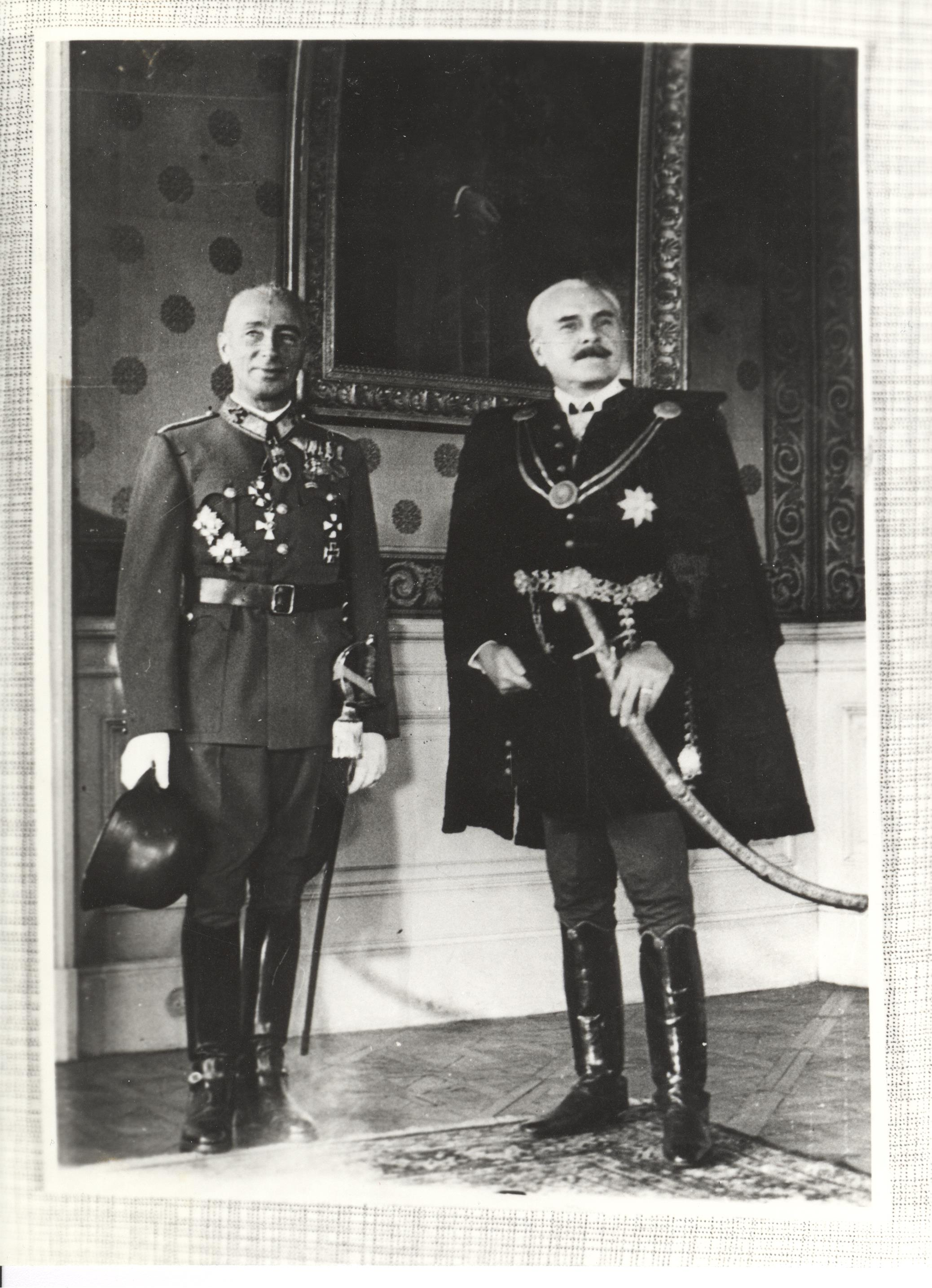
Prime Minister Kállay and National Defense Minister Lajos Csatay, 13 June 1943

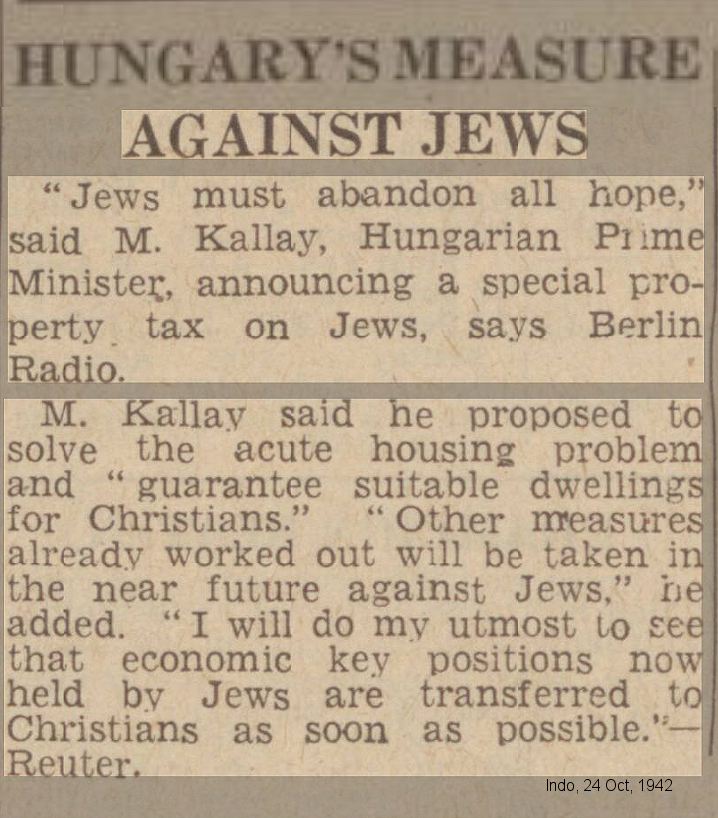
Kallay's Measure Against Jews

In foreign affairs, Kállay supported the German war effort against the Soviet Union. However, he made numerous peaceful overtures to the Western Allies and even went as far as to promise to surrender to them unconditionally once they reached Hungary's borders. In 1942, Horthy believed that neither side in the war could win, and that the war would end in a stalemate and a negotiated peace. The belief on the part of the Regent that a compromise peace was the most likely outcome of the war hindered Kállay's ability to sign an armistice with the Allies in 1942 as Horthy wanted to wait until the war ended in order to achieve the most favorable outcome for Hungary. In particular, Horthy wanted to keep all of the terrorirty that Hungary had gained since 1938 at the expense of Czechoslovakia, Romania and Yugoslavia, which also imposed problems in signing an armistice.

In his speeches, Kállay told the usual antisemitic and anti-Communist line that Hungarian politicians usually took during the Horthy era. However, in private, Kállay told several leaders of the Hungarian Jewish community to not pay any attention to his speeches, which stated were merely "sop" to appease the Germans and did not reflect his true feelings. His policies came to be known as the "Kállay two-step" (the "two-step" was a popular Hungarian dance at the time) or as the "Kállay see-saw" as he moved back and fourth from supporting the Axis to a more neutral stance. In the Lower House of Parliament, Kállay had a majority in form of the Party of Hungarian Life, but faced vigorous opposition from the Party of Hungarian Renewal led by Béla Imrédy and the Arrow Cross Party led by Ferenc Szálasi. Both Imrédy and Szálasi complained that the existing anti-Semitic laws were insufficient, a claim that brought them considerable popular support, which Kállay tried to club by appealing to the anti-Semitic voters himself.

Kállay did pass two major anti-Semitic laws. One was purely symbolic, namely the repeal of a 1895 law that had recognized Judaism as one of the official religions of the Kingdom of Hungary, which had been largely moot since the passage of the First Anti-Jewish Law of 1938. The other law was a law reform measure to confiscate the estates owned by wealthy Jews and give the land to their Christian tenants, which was opposed by the Magyar nobility who feared it would create a precedent for land reform on their estates. Kállay stated to Hungarian Jewish community leaders that his land reform law was only intended to be temporary and he would give back the land once the war ended. In the Kingdom of Hungary, being a land-owning gentleman or a lady married to the said gentleman was the social idea, and to make one's living via trade or in the professions was considered to be a shameful and dishonorable way of making a living. As Hungarian Jews by the virtue of their religion were not considered capable of being proper Hungarian gentlemen or ladies, a disproportionate number of the people engaged in the professions or trades were Jewish. However, in the 19th century some of the more wealthier Hungarian Jewish families who had wanted to be seen as proper Hungarian gentlemen or ladies had successfully petitioned the King-Emperor Franz Josef to grant them titles of nobility. By the time of the downfall of the House of Habsburg in 1918, 126 of the more richer Hungarian Jewish families had been ennobled. Kállay in his defense noted that these 126 families made up a very a tiny percentage of the Hungarian Jewish population and the number of Jews effected by his land reform law were very small.

Between 6–8 June 1942, Kállay visited Berlin where he met Adolf Hitler at the Reich Chancellery. In a speech summarising his visit to Germany on 11 June 194 Kállay his "impressions and experiences in Germany" had reinforced his belief in an "ultimate German victory". The cabinet minister whom Kállay trusted the most was the Interior minister Ferenc Keresztes-Fischer, who was one of the leaders of the conservative faction, who advised him to pull Hungary out of the war before it was too late. Antal Ullein-Reviczky, the chief of the Foreign Ministry's Press Department, was married to an Englishwoman and in the summer of 1942 while vacationing in Istanbul he and his wife was able to make contact with the British consulate. Ullein-Reviczky stated that Kállay was willing to sign an armistice with the Allies. In the summer of 1942, in an attempt to fire his pro-Nazi defense minister, Károly Bartha, Kállay ordered an investigation into the reports of the mistreatment of the men serving in the labour service battalions. The report presented to Parliament in September 1942 confirmed the stories about the labour service and stated "brutality, violence and corruption were permanent manifestations in all the front lines". On 24 September 1942, Kállay fired Bartha and replaced him as defense minister with Vilmos Nagy de Nagybaczon who was ordered to improve the conditions in the labour service.

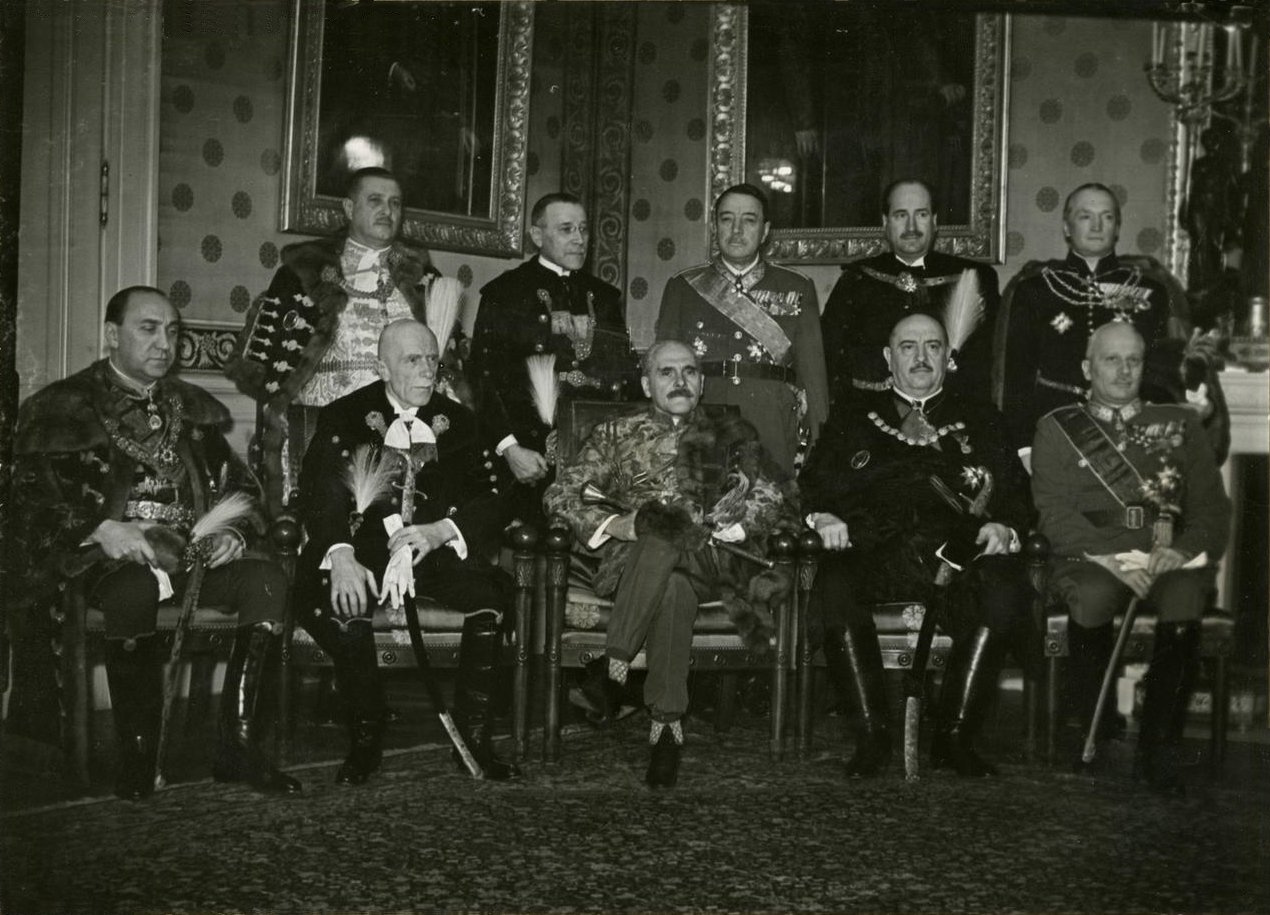
Kállay (sitting in the center) with his cabinet, March 1942, dressed for the most part in the traditional uniforms of Magary noblemen. Sitting to Kállay's left is the Interior minister and his closest ally, Ferenc Keresztes-Fischer. Sitting to Kállay's right is the Education Minister Bálint Hóman. Sitting to Hóman's right is the Defense Minister Károly Bartha. In September 1942, Kállay sacked Bartha as Defense Minister.

On 14 October 1942, Jagow met with the Hungarian Foreign Minister Jenő Ghyczy to tell him that his government was extremely unhappy about the unwillingness of Kállay to deport the Hungarian Jews to the death camps. To buy time, Ghyczy told Jagow that Kállay would give a major speech on the "Jewish Question" very soon. When Kállay did give his speech on 22 October 1942, Jagow was very disappointed as he noted Kállay called the "Jewish Question" just one of the major problems facing his government and labelled those who wanted a "radical" solution "degraded men". In his speech, Kállay stated: "I must contradict those people who can see no other problem in this country except the Jewish problem. Our country has many problems beside which the Jewish problem pales into insignificance. Those who can see Hungary only through such spectacles are degraded men who must be eliminated from our community. I shall do my utmost, I shall go to the utmost limits everywhere in the country's interest, but I cannot and will not allow anyone to soil the national honor and reputation of Hungary, nor to obstruct the great aim of concentrating the nation's forces, by political extremism and base propaganda." On 27 October 1942, Jagow went to see Kállay at the prime minister's office where the meeting was extremely difficult as Jagow took an aggressive bullying stance towards Kállay. Kállay told Jagow that his government would have to move slowly on the "Jewish Question" as most of the Hungarian middle class were Jewish and that to deport these people would cause the Hungarian economy to collapse, answers that enraged Jagow. Jagow informed Kállay that his view the "Jewish Question" was an "international problem" that required a global solution, and told Kállay that his concerns about the economic problems that would result from the destruction of the Hungarian Jews could be easily resolved by a joint commission of Hungarian and German experts.

In November 1942 Jagow once again met with Kállay, who now provided another reason for delay. Kállay stated to Jagow that the Hungarian peasants were not especially antisemitic, and if the Jews were deported, demands would be raised for Hungary to solve the problem imposed by its volksdeutsche minority. In what appeared to be an attempt at blackmail, Kállay told Jagow if he deported the Jews, he would have to close the German language schools for the Hungarian volksdeutsche and stop the Waffen-SS recruitment of Hungarian volksdeutsche. Jagow was engaged by Kállay equating the Hungarian Jews with the Hungarian volksdeutsche, saying that there was no comparison between the two minorities and warned the prime minister not to close the German language schools, which he called essential to allow the Hungarian volksdeutsche to retain their deutschtum (Germanness). Despite Jagow's bullying and threatening behavior, Kállay held a trump card in that most of the oil Germany used came from Romania and to reach the Reich, the Romanian oil was transported via railroad through Hungary. Kállay knew that Germany could easily occupy Hungary, but also knew that if the Hungarians destroyed their railroad system and bridges, Germany would be off from the Romanian oil for a considerable period of time, which would alter the entire course of the war. A sign of worsening relations with Germany occurred in early 1943 when Kállay presented Jagow with an official protest that during the retreat to the river Don following the Battle of Stalingrad that the SS had massacred several battalions of Hungarian Jews serving in the Labor service battalions of the Hungarian Army. Jagow also complained that the new defense minister, Vilmos Nagy de Nagybaczon, had issued orders to improve conditions in the Labor service.

Towards the end of January 1943, Kállay had a three-man delegation consisting of the former prime minister István Bethlen, Cardinal Jusztinián György Serédi, the Catholic Prince Primate of Hungary, and Chief Justice Géza Töreki of the Supreme Court to meet Horthy at the Royal Castle. Bethlen, Cardinal Serédi and Justice Töreki presented to the regent a three point memo, which advised Horthy that he should:

- "Request the withdrawal as soon as possible of the Hungarian fighting forces from the [Eastern] front".
- "Reinforce the army at home in expectation of a power vacuum after the war".
- "Urgently reestablish constitutional rights and respect for the law, including punishment of the military responsible for the atrocities at Újvidék [modern Novi Sad] as well as implementation of Jewish laws in the spirit of humanity and Christianity".

On 1 February 1943, András Frey, a journalist with the Magyar Nemzet newspaper arrived in Istanbul to open talks with the staff of the British consulate about signing an armistice. Frey stated that Kállay wanted to sign an armistice and was open to having Hungary occupied by British, American and especially by Polish soldiers. Reflecting the traditional Hungarian-Polish friendship, Kállay expressly wanted the Polish Army divisions in exile loyal to the Polish government-in-exile to be the Allied occupying force in Hungary. Kállay was upset when he learned that Frey had not negotiating directly with the Foreign Office, but rather with the Special Operations Executive who in turn employed György Pálóczi-Horváth, a Hungarian with a questionable reputation living in Istanbul as their agent to meet Frey.

The destruction of the Hungarian 2nd Army in the battle along the Don river in January 1943 came as an immense shock in Hungary and stirred Kállay to sign an armistice. In February 1943, Kállay met with György Barcza, the former Minister Plenipotentiary in London, to ask him to go to Rome in order to have the Vatican contact the British and American governments about signing an armistice, a mission that Barcza performed in March 1943. In the session of Parliament on 19 February 1943, Kállay was criticised from the left by the MPs Zoltán Tildy and Károly Rassay for having Hungary at war with the Soviet Union and from the right by the MP Béla Imrédy for not ensuring the 2nd Army was ready for combat before it departed in April 1942. Kállay sent the chief of the general staff, Ferenc Szombathelyi, to see Hitler to request the return of the HUngarian Expeditionary Force from the Soviet Union under the grounds that public opinion was against the heavy losses being endured on the Eastern Front, a request that was refused. Hitler suggested that the Hungarians send two divisions to occupy Serbia in order to free up German troops elsewhere, a request that Szombathelyi agreed to. Szombathelyi believed that the redeployment to Serbia would allow the Hungarians to surrender to any Anglo-American force that might enter the Balkans as well as easing German suspicions. At two meetings of the Council of Ministers on 10 March 1943 and again on 30 March 1943, Kállay rejected the plan to occupy Serbia, saying it would damage Hungary's image in the West and made it more difficult to sign an armistice. Both Kállay and Kerzesztes-Fischer told Horthy they would resign if he agreed to the Serbia deployment. While debating strategy with Szombathelyi, Kállay had also in March 1943 asked Otto von Habsburg, the pretender to the vacant throne of Hungary, who was known to be a friend of President Franklin D. Roosevelt, to contact the Roosevelt about opening talks for an armistice. On 30 March 1943, Horthy decided against the Serbia deployment and to pull out all the Hungarian soldiers from the Soviet Union except for two light divisions which were to perform occupation duties only in the Ukraine. The rejection of the Serbia deployment did much to increase Hitler's mistrust of Kállay.

Kállay wrote in his memoirs that Horthy's biggest weakness was his romantic and idealised image of the Honved, writing that "unfortunately the Hungarian army was not what he thought it was." Kállay wrote that the Honved "wanted to organize everything, and deeply despised parliamentarianism, liberal, and democratic ideas. And at the end of the thirties the first signs of German influence began to show." He wrote that a recurring problem throughout his entire time as prime minister was that Horthy "blindly believed the reports that came to him, was convinced of the loyalty of every officer, and saw in every general a gentleman of integrity." Kállay wrote that he tried to persuade Horthy numerous times to control the Honved which was impossible because the regent “blindly believed and trusted in the valor and honesty of the Hungarian soldier."

At the very beginning of April 1943, Kállay visited Rome to meet Benito Mussolini, where he suggested a bloc of Hungary, Finland and Italy to form an axis-within-the-Axis to resist the power of the Reich. Mussolini poured cold water over Kállay's idea, saying he must be careful not to offend Hitler, who be opposed to such a bloc if he learned of what Kállay had proposed. During the same visit to Rome, Kállay visited the Vatican to meet Pope Pius XII and to ask for his help with the armistice. Pius agreed, provided that Mussolini gave his permission, which was refused. On 9 April 1943, Kállay was confronted by Jagow, who told him that he knew about Barcza's peace mission in Rome, which made Kállay visibly uncomfortable.

In April 1943 Kállay had wanted Bethlen to go to Switzerland to contact British and American diplomats about signing an armistice, but he changed his mind, feeling that Bethlen was too famous for such a mission and instead Barcza was chosen to go. Barcza undertook the mission, but in his memoirs lambasted Kállay for having a lackadaisical attitude about signing an armistice, saying Kállay seemed to regard signing an armistice as something that was not especially urgent. The initial peace talks started in Switzerland, but the bulk of the Anglo-American-Hungarian armistice talks took place in Turkey. The Turkish government under the leadership of President İsmet İnönü leaned in a pro-Allied neutrality and Turkish diplomats were most helpful in settling up meetings, which usually took place in Istanbul, Turkey's largest city and former capital.

Upon his return to Budapest, Kállay faced himself faced with a rebellious caucus as many of the MPs of the ruling Party of Hungarian Life were proved less and less willing to vote for the government. The most effective critic was the former prime minister Béla Imrédy who had once belonged to the Party of Hungarian Life and had supporters in the backbenches of the party. Imrédy focused most of his criticism on the Defense Minister Vilmos Nagy de Nagybaczon, whose efforts to improve conditions in the Labour Service Imrédy was stoutly opposed to. Kállay's government narrowly survived several votes of no-confidence in the spring of 1943, on occasion surviving by only 9 votes. In an effort to save his government, Kállay met in private with Imrédy to ask him to stop his attacks on his government, an appeal Imrédy rejected. Believing he would lose the next vote of no confidence, on the morning of 4 May 1943 Kállay asked Horthy to suspend the next session of Parliament, which was scheduled to start the next day. On 5 May 1943, Kállay appeared before Parliament to tell the MPs that he had a letter from Horthy saying that Parliament would be prorogued to some underdetermined date in the fall of 1943. Imrédy, knowing that Kállay's government was about to be defeated on a motion of no confidence, violently protested the prolongation. Frustrated, Imrédy took up the case of dubious business dealings that involved Nagy to paint the Defense Minister as corrupt. In June 1943, Kállay asked Nagy to resign and replaced as Defense Minister with Lajos Csatay.

On 10 July 1943, the Allies invaded Sicily and on 25 July 1943 Mussolini was dismissed as Italian prime minister by King Victor Emmanuel III. Kállay believed that the Allies would invade the mainland of Italy, which might also be followed by landings in the Balkans. According, the pace of the armistice talks in Turkey suddenly accelerated. In a speech on 15 July 1943, Kállay announced his government was opening an investigation into the Novi Sad raid of January 1942. The investigation was part of his peace efforts as the same time Kállay dispatched an emissary to the Chetnik leader Draža Mihailović offering an apology for the massacre and asked him to pass on the message to the Special Operations Executive. In early August 1943 the diplomat László Veress was dispatched to Istanbul to conclude an armistice with the British. The Anglophile Veress was able to open direct talks with British diplomats and made the crucial concession of accepting the unconditional surrender formula. On 16 August 1943, Veress secured a promise to open direct talks and on 20 August 1943 he met with John Cecil Sterndale-Bennett of the British embassy in Ankara who made the trip to Istanbul to see him.

On 9 September 1943, on abroad a yacht in the Sea of Marmara, just outside of Istanbul, the British ambassador to Turkey, Sir Hughe Knatchbull-Hugessen secretly signed an armistice with the Hungarian diplomat László Veress under which Hungarian forces would surrender to British and American forces the moment they arrived in Hungary. Under the terms of the armistice, once British forces reached Hungary, Hungary would declare war on Germany and cut off the Reich from the Romanian oil fields. In the interim, Hungary was to pull out the Expedtionary Force fighting on the Eastern Front and gradually reduce economic co-operation with Germany. Through Kállay rejected the armistice when he learned that it included the Allied demand for unconditional surrender, on 10 September the Hungarian consul in Istanbul, Dezső Újvary, agreed to these terms. On 10 September 1943, Andor Wodianer, the Hungarian ambassador in Lisbon, tod Sir Ronald Hugh Campbell, the British ambassador in Lisbon hat his government would abide by the terms of the secret armistice. Kállay was opposed to the unconditional surrender formula, which he saw as the end of Hungarian independence, but indicated if the British would drop the demand for unconditional surrender, he would accept any armistice terms as he most anxious for British soldiers to arrive in Hungary before the Red Army arrived.

In September 1943, a formal inquiry into the massacre in Novi Said opened. Kállay called the massacre the worse crime in Hungarian history and argued that as prime minister he had duty to bring the perpetrators to justice. On 13 December 1943, a court martial opened against Lieutenant General Ferenc Feketehalmy-Czeydner, Lieutenant Colonel László Deák, Major General József Grassy and Captain Márton Zóldy, who were allowed to remain free during their trial. Shortly after the convictions of the accused, on 18 January 1944 the convicted fled Hungary with the help of Archduke Albrecht of the House of Habsburg and were granted asylum. Kállay did not ask for their extradition from Germany. Besides for Hungary's Jewish population, Kállay's government had allowed a number of British, American, Soviet, French and Polish POWs who had escaped from camps in Germany to reside more or less openly in Hungary, and Kállay was afraid that requesting the extradition of Feketehalmy-Czeydner would lead to German demands to turn over the escaped POWs along with the Hungarian Jews.

In September 1943, the Hungarian military attache to Bulgaria, Ottó Hátszeghy, received an invitation to attend an international trade fair in İzmir where the American delegation included several known agents of the Office of Strategic Services (OSS). With the approval of Gyula Kádár, the director of the intelligence service, Hatz attended the trade fair and contacted the OSS. On 8 October 1943, Hatz returned to Budapest to meet Kádár to show him the radio that the OSS had given him. Hatz and Kádár met with the chief of the general staff, General Ferenc Szombathelyi, who in turn arranged for them to meet Kállay. Hatz was transferred over to Turkey as military attache, where he continued to meet OSS agents attached to the American embassy in Ankara and the American consulate in Istanbul. Szombathelyi passed along military information to the OSS along with a map of Hungary showing the location of various airfields where U.S. Army soldiers might land. Colonel Sàndor Homlok, the Hungarian military attache to Germany, told Ribbentrop that he heard rumors from friends on the general staff that Szombathelyi was negotiating with the OSS via Hatz, which slowed down the pace of the talks. Kállay broke off the negotiations with the OSS on 14 February 1944 after the OSS refused his demand for a written promise that the United States would occupy Hungary before the Soviet Union did.

Inconveniently for Kállay, starting in November 1943, Elyesa Bazna, the Albanian valet to Knatchbull-Hugessen, was able to obtain access to his master's safe, photographed secret British diplomatic documents, and sold them to the Germans. The Germans paid Bazna with counterfeit British pounds, which thereby ruined his dreams of getting rich from his treachery. One of the documents Bazna sold to the Germans was the secret armistice Knatchbull-Hugessen had signed with Veress, which was received with great interest in Berlin.

By the late 1943, as the military situation deteriorated for the Axis powers, circles around Regent Horthy and Prime Minister Kállay sought more backchannel negotiations to exit the war. On 18 December 1943, Prince György Ghika, former Hungarian Minister to Washington before Hungary's declaration of war, acted as an intermediary in Bern, Switzerland, delivering a confidential communication from Miklós Horthy Jr. regarding Hungary's potential armistice and capitulation to the Western Allies. In Bern, Ghika verbally conveyed to Allied representatives that the Hungarian leadership was awaiting an operational signal from the Western Allies before acting.

At the same time, Kállay made it clear that he regarded the Soviet Union as the greater evil, which colored his attempts to sign an armistice. In February 1944, he told Barcza if he had to choose between having Hungary occupied by the Soviet Union vs. being occupied by Nazi Germany, he would always go with the latter as the Soviet Communists would end the existing social system that placed aristocrats like himself on the top of the social pyramid while the German Nazis would not. Kállay continued to hold to unrealistic hopes that the Anglo-American armies in Italy would reach Hungary before the Red Army did while making no plans to resist a German occupation.

The Germans finally had enough of his policies and occupied Hungary in March 1944, which forced Horthy to oust Kállay and replace him with the more pliable Döme Sztójay. On 15 March 1943, Jagow told Horthy that Hitler wanted to see him at Schloss Klessheim on 20 March, saying this was an urgent meeting that could not be put off. Kállay urged Horthy not to go, saying that it was a trap, but the regent believed that his honor as a Hungarian office and gentleman required that he go. On 17 March, Horthy met with Hitler at Schloss Klessheim castle, where Hitler stated that he ordered the occupation of Italy in September 1943 after the Italians had signed a secret armistice with the Allies and he was well aware of the secret armistice that Veress had signed with Knatchbull-Hugessen just a few days after the Italian armistice. Hitler blamed Kállay for the armistice and stated he was going to occupy Hungary regardless of what Horthy wanted, but that he preferred that the regent co-operate. Horthy agreed to accept the German occupation of his country and to offer no resistance, to dismiss Kállay and to stay on as Regent as Horthy believed that he could somehow make the occupation better by remaining. After his meeting with Hitler at Schloss Klessheim, Horthy returned to Budapest. The Germans delayed his return by side-tracking his train while Kállay had no idea of what Horthy had agreed to.

Kállay later recalled he had gone to bed and that: "I was hardly in me bed when my direct phone with the ministry of the interior rang. Kerzesztes-Fischer told me only to get dressed and that he would be with me very quickly because serious events were under way. A few minutes later he arrived to tell me that the frontier guards had reported that the Germans had crossed the border in trains, tanks and armored cars, the various units evidently heading towards Budapest...Accordingly to the general staff the following forces had been concentrated against us: on the western frontier, five German divisions; in the north and around Kassa one German and one Slovak divisions; along the southeastern frontier ten Romanian divisions; in the Belgrade area, four to five German divisions; westward of this, important Croatian forces had been deposed against us. The only forces that we had ready for action were those in the Carpathians". Kállay called am emergency meeting with the three most senior Honved generals in Budapest, namely General János Vörös, General Károly Beregfy and General István Náday to ask them what could be done to resist the invasion. At that point, a telegram from the Chief of the General Staff, Ferenc Szombathelyi, arrived, saying that there was to be no resistance until Horthy returned to Budapest. The German military attache, General Greiffenberg, then appeared with a letter from Field Marshal Wilhelm Keitel, the chief of the Oberkommando der Wehrmacht (the German equivalent of the Defense Ministry). Keitel's letter was the first inking Kállay had of the Schloss Klessheim agreement and warned that any Hungarian resistance would be "ruthlessly" crushed and added in for good measure that Germany would support the territorial claims of Slovakia, Romania and Croatia against Hungary in the event of resistance. Kállay found himself faced with the dilemma of ordering resistance or accepting the occupation of his country. Vörös, Beregfy and Náday told him that resistance was futile and urged acceptance under the grounds that it was better to be occupied by Nazi Germany than by the Soviet Union. Kállay was angry with the defeatist attitude by the three Honved generals, saying it was matter of Hungarian national honor that resistance be offered to the invasion. Both Vörös and Beregfy flatly refused to obey Kállay's orders to resist while Náday was willing, but warned Kállay that he was risking a civil war as many Honved officers were milliantly pro-Nazi. Kállay finally extracted a promise that the Honved would resist if attacked and was to be placed on the highest state of alert. He then spent the next three hours, burning secret documents from the prime minister's office while his son Christopher phoned government ministers, Anglophile aristocrats and Jewish community leaders that the country was being occupied.

The invasion took place with hardly any Hungarian resistance and when Horthy train finally reached Budapest, he was greeted by a honor of Wehrmacht soldiers led by Field Marshal Maximilian von Weichs. When Kállay arrived at the Kelenfõld train station to greet Horthy, he was astonished to see no Hungarian soldiers as part of the honor guard to greet the regent. He reported that Horthy "looked worn out but still master of himself". At a subsequent meeting of the Crown Council at the Royal Castle, Horthy informed Kállay of the Schloss Klessheim agreement. Both Kállay and Kerzesztes-Fischer stated that Hungary was no longer independent and that any actions had here on would be illegal. Kerzesztes-Fischer stated that Germans had already arrested 45 promient Hungarians including several MPs and that Jews were no longer permitted to move around. Kállay urged Horthy to abdicate, saying by remaining Regent Horthy was legimizatising everything that was happening as he late stated it "was the only way we could refute the story which the Germans were spreading he had consented to the military occupation". Horthy declined to abdiate saying "the captain cannot leave his sinking ship". He then changed tack and urged Horthy to follow the example of King Christian X of Denmark who had retired to the countryside, which Kállay stated would be a way to show quiet disapproval, which Horthy again rejected. The new German minister-plenipotentiary, Edmund Veesenmayer, wanted Béla Imrédy as the new prime minister, whom Horthy refused. Finally on 22 March 1944, Horthy decided upon Döme Sztójay, the Hungarian minister plenipotentiary to Germany, as an acceptable compromise and sworn him in as prime minister on 23 March 1944.

== Imprisonment ==
Kállay evaded the Nazis at first, and fled to the Turkish legation, where the Turkish minister-plenipotentiary Sevket Fuat Kereci allowed him to stay. Kállay was eventually captured by the Arrow Cross regime in October 1944 when he unwisely left the Turkish legation. He was sent first to Dachau and then to Mauthausen. In late April 1945, he was transferred to Tyrol, together with other prominent concentration camp inmates, where the SS left the prisoners behind. He was liberated by the Fifth US Army on 5 May 1945.

== Exile ==
In 1946 he went into exile and finally settled in the United States in 1951. In 1954, he published his memoirs, Hungarian Premier: A Personal Account of a Nation's Struggle in the Second World War (Columbia University Press).

== See also ==
- Diplomatic history of World War II
- Hungary in World War II

== Sources ==
- Braham, Randolph L (Summer 1977). "The Jewish Question in German-Hungarian Relations during the Kállay Era". Jewish Social Studies. 39 (3): 183–209.
- Cornelius, Deborah S (2011). Hungary in World War II: Caught in the Cauldron. New York: Fordham University Press. ISBN 978-0823233441.
- Czettler, Antal. "Miklos Kallay's attempts to preserve Hungary's independence." Hungarian Quarterly 41.159 (2000): 88-103.
- Antal Ullein-Reviczky, Guerre Allemande, Paix Russe: Le Drame Hongrois. Neuchatel: Editions de la Baconniere, 1947.
- Nicholas Kállay, Hungarian premier: a personal account of a nation's struggle in the second world war; forew. by C.A. Macartney, New York : Columbia Univ. P., 1954. online review
- Kramer, T.D (2000). From Emancipation to Catastrophe The Rise and Holocaust of Hungarian Jewry. London: : Bloomsbury Academic. ISBN 9780761817598.
- Janos, Andrew (2012). The Politics of Backwardness in Hungary, 1825-1945. Princeton: Princeton University Press. ISBN 9781400843022.
- C.A. Macartney, October Fifteenth: A History of Modern Hungary, 1929–1945, 2 vols, Edinburgh University Press 1956–7.
- György Ránki, Unternehmen Margarethe: Die deutsche Besetzung Ungarns, Böhlau, 1984.
- Romsics, Ignác (1995). István Bethlen: A Great Conservative Statesman of Hungary, 1874–1946. New York: East European Monographs. Columbia University Press..
- Turbucz, Dávid (Winter 2025). "Under the Influence of His Leader Cult: Miklós Horthy's Self-Image During World War II". Hungarian Studies Review. 52 (1): 67–85.
- Ignac Romsics, Hungary in the Twentieth Century, Budapest: Corvina, 1999.
- Antal Ullein-Reviczky, German War, Russian Peace: The Hungarian Tragedy. Translated by Lovice Mária Ullein-Reviczky. Reno, NV. Helena History Press, 2014.

Political offices
Preceded by Emil Purgly	Minister of Agriculture; 1932–1935	Succeeded by Kálmán Darányi
Preceded by Ferenc Keresztes-Fischer; Acting	Prime Minister of Hungary; 1942–1944	Succeeded by Döme Sztójay
Preceded by Ferenc Keresztes-Fischer; Acting	Minister of Foreign Affairs; 1942–1943	Succeeded by Jenő Ghyczy
