= Döme Sztójay =

Hungarian politician

General Döme Sztójay
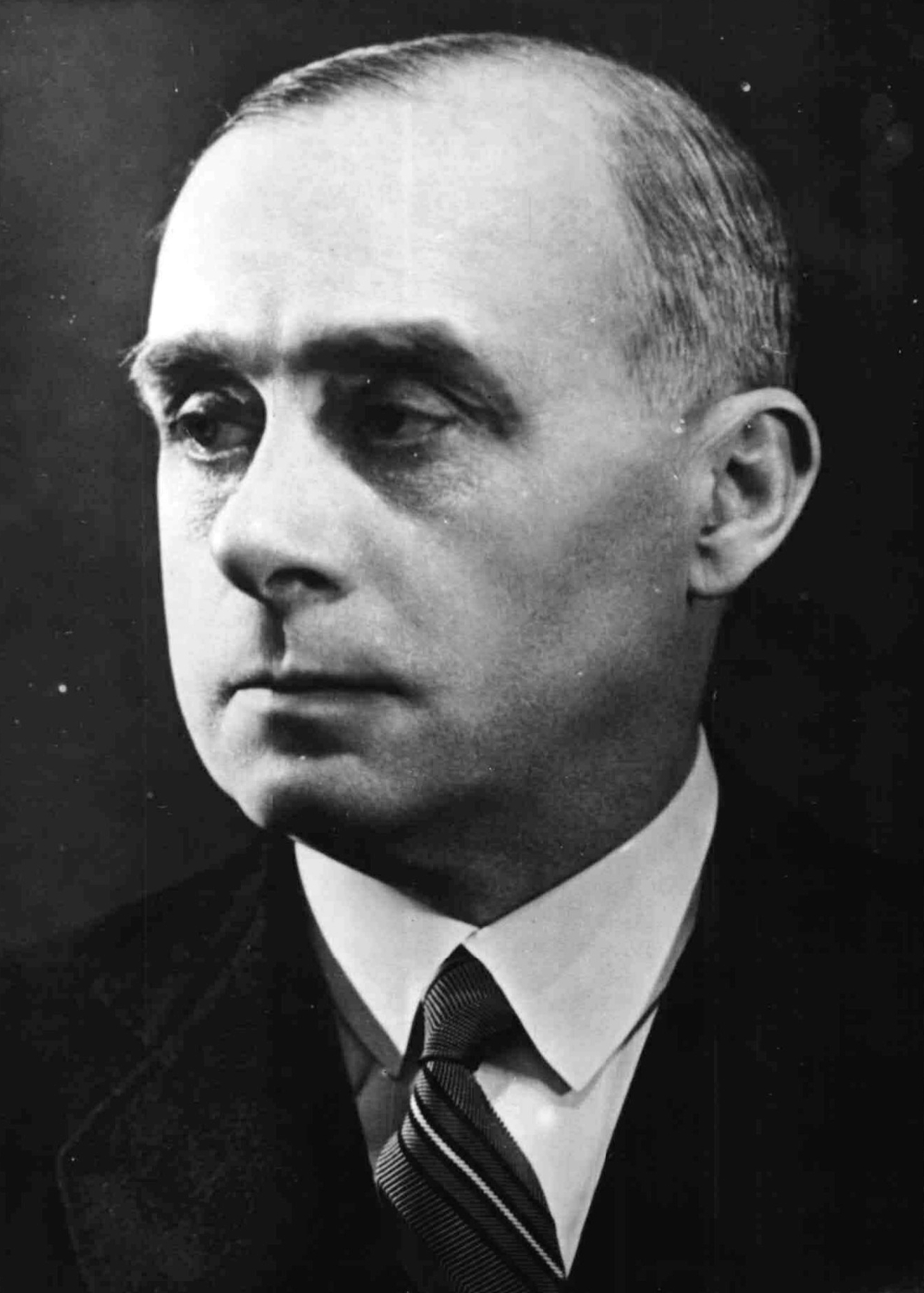
- Formal portrait, 1944

Prime Minister of Hungary
- In office 22 March 1944 – 29 August 1944
- Regent: Miklós Horthy
- Preceded by: Miklós Kállay
- Succeeded by: Géza Lakatos

Personal details
- Born: Dimitrije Stojaković; 5 January 1883 Versec, Kingdom of Hungary, Austria-Hungary (today Vršac, Serbia)
- Died: 22 August 1946 (aged 63) Budapest, Hungary
- Cause of death: Execution by firing squad
- Party: Party of National Unity
- Spouse: Jozefa Landgráf
- Profession: politician, diplomat

Döme Sztójay (Serbian Cyrillic: Димитрије Стојаковић, 5 January 1883 – 22 August 1946) was a Hungarian soldier and diplomat of Serb origin, who served as Prime Minister of Hungary from March to August 1944, heading the puppet government during the country's occupation by Nazi Germany during World War II.

== Biography ==
=== Early career ===
Born in Versec (modern-day Vršac) into a Serb family as Dimitrije Stojaković (Serbian Cyrillic: Димитрије Стојаковић), Sztójay joined the Austro-Hungarian Army as a young man and served as a colonel during World War I. During the war, he served as an intelligence officer of the general staff of Austria-Hungary. After the war, Sztójay served in Admiral Miklós Horthy’s counter-revolutionary Royal Hungarian Army, specializing in counter-espionage. Regarded as an expert in military intelligence, Sztójay founded the G-2 military intelligence service of the Honved (Royal Hungarian Army) and served as the first director of the G-2 intelligence service. As someone who specialised in the murky business of espionage and moreover had a well deserved reputation as an intriguer, Sztójay was widely regarded as a ruthless schemer who was always engaged in plots to advance his interests.

After Horthy became Regent of Hungary in 1920, Sztójay was promoted to general and served as the military attaché in Berlin from 1927 to 1933. He Magyarized his name to Sztójay in 1927 and converted from Eastern Orthodoxy to Roman Catholicism (the religion of the majority of Hungarians). During his time in Berlin, Sztójay formed close links with the elite of the Reichswehr officers and came to have a profound admiration for the Prussian-German militarism. In 1932, he signed a secret agreement for German-Hungarian co-operation in intelligence operations, especially against Czechoslovakia. From 1933 to 1935, Sztójay served in the Ministry of Defence. In 1935, Prime Minister Gyula Gömbös named Sztójay as Hungarian ambassador to Germany, a position he would hold until 1944.

=== Ambassador to Germany ===
As ambassador, Sztójay formed strong ties with the Third Reich and often voiced support for German policies to his superiors in Hungary. Sztójay regarded himself as representing the Hungarian General Staff instead of the Foreign Ministry in Berlin. He viewed a German-Hungarian alliance as natural as Germany rejected the Treaty of Versailles while Hungary rejected the Treaty of Trianon. Furthermore, Hungary had territorial claims against Czechoslovakia, Romania and Yugoslavia. France had signed treaties of alliances with Czechoslovakia in 1924, Romania in 1926, and Yugoslavia in 1927. Since Germany's enemy was also France, Sztójay believed that a German-Hungarian alliance was essential for both nations, and he worked hard to achieve that goal. Sztójay felt that his nominal superior, the Foreign Minister Kálmán Kánya, was not doing enough to advance a German-Hungarian alliance, and he set about undermining Kánya's authority. During 1937 and 1938, Sztójay acted in a highly subordinate manner as he worked to achieve an alliance with the Reich while intriguing against Kánya. Acting on his own, Sztójay in January 1937 approached the German War Minister, General Werner von Blomberg, to ask for staff talks between the German General Staff and the Hungarian General Staff for a joint plan of war against Czechoslovakia. During the time that Count Pál Teleki was prime minister for a second time from 1939 to 1941, Sztójay worked closely with the Defense Minister Károly Bartha, and the chief of the general staff, General Henrik Werth, in seeking to undermine Teleki's foreign policy. Sztójay often leaked information to the Germans and made it clear he did not support Teleki. Sztójay later boasted that the soldiers of the Honved were "a major indeed decisive, factor in the development of the German-Hungarian relationship" with the clear implication that it was the Honved rather than the civilian leaders who were responsible for the German-Hungarian alliance. In late 1939, Sztójay was joined in his plots by Colonel Sándor Homlok who arrived in Berlin as the military attaché. Homlok had devised a plan in September 1938 for aircraft bearing the colors of the Czechoslovak Air Force to bomb a city in Hungary in order to provide a casus belli for Hungary to invade Czechoslovakia.

In late March 1941 during a visit to the Reich Chancellery to meet Adolf Hitler, Sztójay became probably the first Hungarian to learn of Operation Barbarossa. Hitler told Sztójay that he had "lost patience" with the Soviet Union and he was planning to take drastic action, which Sztójay correctly guessed meant that Germany was going to invade the Soviet Union in the very near-future. After the Yugoslav coup d'état of 27 March 1941, Sztójay was summoned to the Reich Chancellery by Hitler who gave him a letter promising Hungary the return of all the lands lost to Yugoslavia under the Treaty of Trianon in exchange for Hungary giving Germany transit rights to invade Yugoslavia along with Hungary taking part in the invasion. The matter was considered important enough that Hitler lent Sztójay an airplane to take him to Budapest to personally deliver the letter to the regent. At the meeting at the Royal Castle in Budapest, Sztójay was greeted by the Hungarian elite that consisted of the Regent, Admiral Miklós Horthy, the prime minister Pál Teleki, the foreign minister László Bárdossy, the defense minister Károly Bartha and the chief of the general staff, General Henrik Werth. Sztójay, speaking with much enthusiasm demanded acceptance of the offer. Horthy promptly accepted the offer, which Teleki was opposed to. Teleki stayed up late, trying to talk Horthy out of accepting Hitler's offer. Teleki's two arguments were the likely British reaction to Hungary attacking Yugoslavia and the problem of calling reservists serving as farmers at time of widespread flooding in the countryside. For the letter to take back to Berlin, Teleki drafted an ambiguous reply, saying that Hungary accepted the offer, but only assist Germany "in accordance with its power", which for Teleki meant rejection as Hungary had difficult relations with Romania and concentrated troops along the border. However, Sztójay when he returned to Berlin told Hitler that the letter meant Hungarian acceptance of his offer.

On 4 April 1941, when Bartha visited Berlin to see Hitler Sztójay accompanied him to the Reich Chancellery. During the meeting with Hitler, both Bartha and Sztójay put forward a plan for a false flag attack to have Hungary join the invasion of Yugoslavia. The plan called for German aircraft to be painted with the colors of the Royal Yugoslav Air Force to bomb a city in southern Hungary with Szeged being given as the best target in order to bring Hungary into the war. On 6 April 1941, when Germany invaded Yugoslavia, Szeged was bombed by aircraft described as Yugoslav.

The American historian Thomas L. Sakmyster accused Sztójay and Homlok of being the men who organised the bombing of Kassa in June 1941, perhaps with the support and approval of Werth. Starting in May 1941, Sztójay sent regular reports to Budapest predicating that the Germany was going to invade the Soviet Union and demanded that Hungary take part. When Operation Barbarossa was launched on 22 June 1941, Sztójay immediately started to demand that Hungary take part in "the crusade against Bolshevism" as Hitler called the war, and was intensely disappointed when prime minister László Bárdossy did not heed his advice. On 23 June 1941, General Kurt Himer, the German military attaché in Budapest told Werth "if the (Hungarian) soldiers want to participate, they should persuade their politicians." Sakmyster argued that both Sztójay and Homlok were the sort of officers who would engage in a such plot; both had ample reason to manufacture a false flag attack; and that bombing of Kassa closely resembled the plan that Homok had devised in 1938 and which Sztójay had advocated in April 1941 during his meeting with Hitler. Sakmyster argued that Sztójay and Homlok would have not had approached Hitler, who left Berlin for his Wolfsschanze (Wolf's Lair) headquarters deep in the forests of East Prussia right after Operation Barbarossa was launched, where he stayed for most of the summer of 1941. Instead, Sakmyster argued that Sztójay who was friends with numerous Wehrmacht generals would had gone to the Wehrmacht for help with the bombing, knowing that the Wehrmacht generals were more open to having the Honved join Barbarossa than Hitler was. Sakmyster maintained that the conspirators engaged in a false flag operation of this sort would not had written anything done since an operation of this sort would had been treason.

=== Prime Minister ===
In Operation Margarethe in March 1944, the German Army occupied Hungary and forced Horthy to remove Prime Minister Miklós Kállay from office. Kállay, like Horthy, knew that Germany was losing the war, and had put out numerous feelers to the West. On 9 September 1943 László Veress, an employee of the Ministry of Exterior signed a secret agreement to surrender unconditionally to the Western Allies. Although Kállay and his government had promised on numerous occasions to surrender to the Western Allies as soon as they reached Hungary, Veress' agreement was unauthorized, as in Kállay's consideration it effectively gave up Hungary's sovereignty.

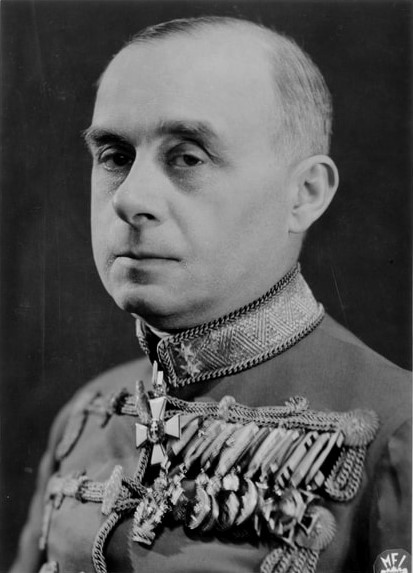
As lieutenant general in 1944

Nevertheless, the agreement didn't sit well with Berlin. When they took over the country, the Germans gave Horthy a choice between choosing a new prime minister who would cooperate with the Germans or undisguised occupation. Knowing that the latter would likely mean a Gauleiter who would treat Hungary in the same manner as the other Nazi-occupied countries, Horthy chose the former. The German Plenipotentiary for Hungary, Edmund Veesenmayer, proposed that Horthy reappoint Béla Imrédy, who had been prime minister earlier in the war (and who had, ironically, a Jewish great-grandfather). However, Horthy balked at appointing the strongly pro-German Imrédy and suggested Sztójay instead. Though Sztójay had been ambassador to Berlin for a decade and was known to be pro-German, Horthy believed that at bottom he was a soldier first and would not totally give in to German demands. The Germans readily approved of Horthy's choice, and on 23 March 1944, Sztójay was appointed prime minister and Minister of Foreign Affairs. Shortly after being appointed prime minister, Sztójay met SS-Obergruppenführer Ernst Kaltenbrunner, who had arrived in Budapest with the German invasion. The transcript of the Sztójay-Kaltenbrunner meeting was destroyed afterwards, but accordingly to Imrédy who also attended the meeting, an agreement was reached for the extermination of all entire Hungarian Jewish community.

On 5 April 1944, Sztójay told the Prince Primate of Hungary, Cardinal Jusztinián György Serédi that Jews who had converted to Catholicism would be subject to the racial laws he was imposing, but he would exempt those Jewish converts who had become Catholic priests, monks and nuns. On 13 April and again on 23 April 1944, Cardinal Serédi met Sztójay to complain about the way his government treated Jewish converts to Catholicism, but Sztójay told him that he should focus on praying for a victory over "Bolshevism" instead. Despite requests from several bishops, Cardinal Serédi never publicly condemned the genocide that Sztójay was perpetuating against Hungarian Jews out the grounds that Sztójay might persecute Catholics and that the best course was to stay silent.

As prime minister, Sztójay legalized Ferenc Szálasi's Arrow Cross Party, increased Hungarian troop levels on the Eastern Front, dissolved the nation's labor unions, jailed political opponents, and cracked down on left wing politicians and activists. He also significantly ramped up the pace of forced deportations of Hungarian Jews. In early June 1944, Horthy first wrote to Sztójay about the "Jewish Question", saying that he had just heard disturbing reports of inhumane treatment of Hungarian Jews. Horthy asked Sztójay to exempt from the racial laws Jewish converts to Christianity along with Jewish doctors, engineers and businessmen. Horthy noted a disproportionate number of businessmen, doctors and engineers in Hungary were Jewish and that Sztójay's anti-Semitic campaign had pushed the economy to the brink of collapse as while making it almost impossible for many people to receive medical treatment. Horthy also asked Sztójay to remove from the Interior Ministry the two state secretaries, László Endre and László Baky, whom Horthy stated were executing the anti-Semitic campaign in an "inhumane" way, and for Sztójay when he visited Berlin on 6 June to ask Hitler to end the occupation of Hungary. Horthy's letter had no impact. Horthy's letter to Sztójay in early June 1944 was the first time that he mentioned the deportations as he himself claimed that he just heard about these reports. Horthy and his family claimed that he did not know about the Holocaust until early July 1944 and that the reason why he took no action in May-June 1944 was because he did not know that all the Jews being deported were being exterminated. Horthy's daughter-in-law, Ilona Horthy, stated the regent first learned about the Holocaust on 3 July 1944 and that until then he had no idea what was happening to his Jewish subjects.

On 22 June 1944, the Red Army opened Operation Bagration, a highly successful offensive that saw the destruction of the German Army Group Center. With the loss of an entire army group, a huge hole had been created in the German lines on the Eastern Front, and the Wehrmacht made desperate efforts to stem the Soviet advance. With the Wehrmacht pulling divisions out of Hungary to deal with the emergency caused by Bagration, Horthy regained the room for action. On 23 June 1944, Bishop Laszlo Ravasz along with 9 other bishops of the Reformed Church issued a public statement asking for Sztójay to stop deportations. Sztójay did not respond to the appeal from the Reform Church to stop. On 29 June 1944, Cardinal Serédi, under pressure from his bishops, wrote a pastoral letter that criticised the deportations of the Jews as against divine law and demanded the deportations stop immediately. Serédi however qualified his criticism in his pastoral letter by saying that Hungarian Jews had a negative influence on the economy, society and sexuality and some sort of anti-Semitic laws were needed, but just not the current ones. Sztójay met with Cardinal Serédi and promised him he would investigate the reports that the Jews being deported were all being exterminated and to stop the deportations if that were true in exchange for the pastoral letter not being issued, an offer Serédi promptly accepted.

On 6 July 1944, Horthy ordered a halt to the deportations of Jews to Auschwitz. Both Veesenmayer and Adolf Eichmann were extremely unhappy about Horthy's halt order, but with the crisis caused by Operation Bagration, the use of military force to depose Horthy was not considered possible at the moment. On 7 July 1944, Horthy summoned Géza Lakatos-whom István Bethlen had recommended to Horthy as the best man to replace Sztójay-to tell him that he planned to appoint him prime minister soon. However, the chief of the general staff, János Vörös, told Lakatos to refuse the appointment, saying that the Germans forces in Hungary were still too strong and to wait for a better time. Horthy became appalled by Sztójay's actions and demanded his removal as prime minister, but Veesenmayer, backed by Adolf Hitler, sternly refused to do so. On 16 July 1944, Horthy tried to dismiss Sztójay and appoint Lakatos. Horthy had informed Veesenmayer of the planned change and in turn Veesenmayer promptly informed the German foreign minister Joachim von Ribbentrop. On 17 July 1944, Veesenmayer personally arrived at the Royal Castle to give Horthy a letter from Ribbentrop saying that Hitler was opposed to dismissing Sztójay, which he regarded as a violation of the agreement made at the Schloss Klessheim on 19 March 1944. Ribbentrop's letter ended with the threat that Hitler would erase Hungary from the map if the Klessheim agreement were violated by dismissing Sztójay. Veesenmayer reported to Ribbentrop that after reading his letter, Horthy was a "broken old man" and he told him Sztójay would stay. Horthy refused to give in entirely, however, and used his influence to stop the deportations of Hungary's Jews and to force Imrédy out of Sztójay's cabinet.

The turning point in Sztójay's career as prime minister came on 23 August 1944 when King Michael of Romania dismissed Ion Antonescu as prime minister, signed an armistice with the Allies and declared war on Germany and Hungary. With Romania's defection from the Axis to the Allied camps, Germany was cut off from its principle source of oil, the entire German position in the Balkans was undermined with Hitler ordering the withdrawal of the Wehrmacht forces from Greece and southern Yugoslavia before they were cut off, and a Soviet-Romanian force invaded northern Transylvania. With German-Hungarian forces attempting to hold the mountain passes in the Carpathians in Transylvania against the advancing Soviet-Romanian forces, it was clearly not the time for Germany to threaten Hungary over who was the prime minister, and Horthy was able to use the crisis to dismiss Sztójay with minimal protest from Berlin. The Germans finally submitted to Horthy's pressure in August 1944 and Sztójay resigned as prime minister in favour of Géza Lakatos on 29 August 1944. Horthy in his letter to Hitler stated that he had dismissed Sztójay as prime minister because Hitler himself had just violated the Schloss Klessheim agreement, stating that Hitler had promised him that in exchange for accepting a German occupation that the Red Army would never be permitted to enter Hungary while the Red Army had just entered northern Transylvania (a region that Horthy regarded as an integral part of Hungary).

=== Later life ===
When Horthy was removed from power by the Germans in October 1944, Sztójay was not reappointed prime minister due to poor health. Sztójay subsequently fled Hungary when the Germans were driven out of the country by the Red Army in April 1945. Sztójay was later captured by American troops and extradited to Hungary in October 1945, after which time he was tried by a People's Tribunal in Budapest. He was found guilty of war crimes and crimes against the Hungarian people, sentenced to death, and executed by a firing squad in Budapest in 1946.

== Sources ==
- Borhi, Laszlo (2024). Survival under Dictatorships: Life and Death in Nazi and Communist Regimes. Budapest: Central European Press.
- Cornelius, Deborah S (2011). Hungary in World War II: Caught in the Cauldron. New York: Fordham University Press. ISBN 978-0823233441.
- Thomas L. Sakmyster: A Hungarian Diplomat in Nazi Berlin: Sztójay Döme. In: Hungarian history – world history, szerkesztette Ránki György. Budapest: Akadémiai Kiadó, 1984.
- Sakmyster, Thomas L (January 1975). "Army Officers and Foreign Policy in Interwar Hungary, 1918-41". Journal of Contemporary History. 1- (1): 19–40.
- Sakmyster, Thomas L. (1983). "The Search for a Casus Belli and the Origins of the Kassa Bombing" (PDF). Hungarian Studies Review. 10 (1): 53–65. Archived from the original (PDF) on 2021-08-18.
- A magyar Quisling-kormány: Sztójay Döme és társai a népbíróság elõtt / [szerk. Simándi Irén]; [bevezető tanulmányt írta, sajtó alá rend. és a mutatókat készítették: Karsai László, Molnár Judit] Budapest: 1956-os KHT, 2004.

Political offices
Preceded by Miklós Kállay	Prime Minister of Hungary; 1944	Succeeded by Géza Lakatos
Preceded by Jenő Ghyczy	Minister of Foreign Affairs; 1944	Succeeded by Gusztáv Hennyey
