= Jenő Ghyczy =

Hungarian politician

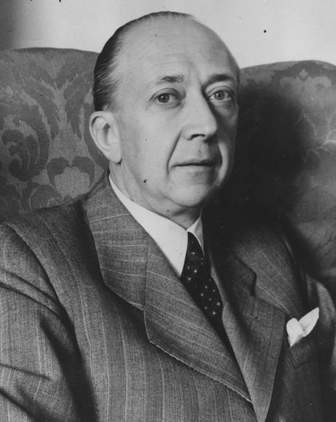

Minister of Foreign Affairs of Hungary
- In office 24 July 1943 – 22 March 1944
- Prime Minister: Miklós Kállay
- Preceded by: Miklós Kállay
- Succeeded by: Döme Sztójay

Personal details
- Born: 4 May 1893 Újpuszta, Austria-Hungary
- Died: 18 January 1982 (aged 88) Budapest, People's Republic of Hungary
- Party: Independent
- Profession: politician

Jenő Ghyczy de Ghicz, Assakürt et Ablánczkürt (4 May 1893 – 18 January 1982) was a Hungarian politician, who served as Minister of Foreign Affairs between 1943 and 1944.

Political offices
Preceded by Miklós Kállay	Minister of Foreign Affairs; 1943–1944	Succeeded by Döme Sztójay
