= László Bárdossy =

Hungarian politician

Noble Dr. László Bárdossy de Bárdos
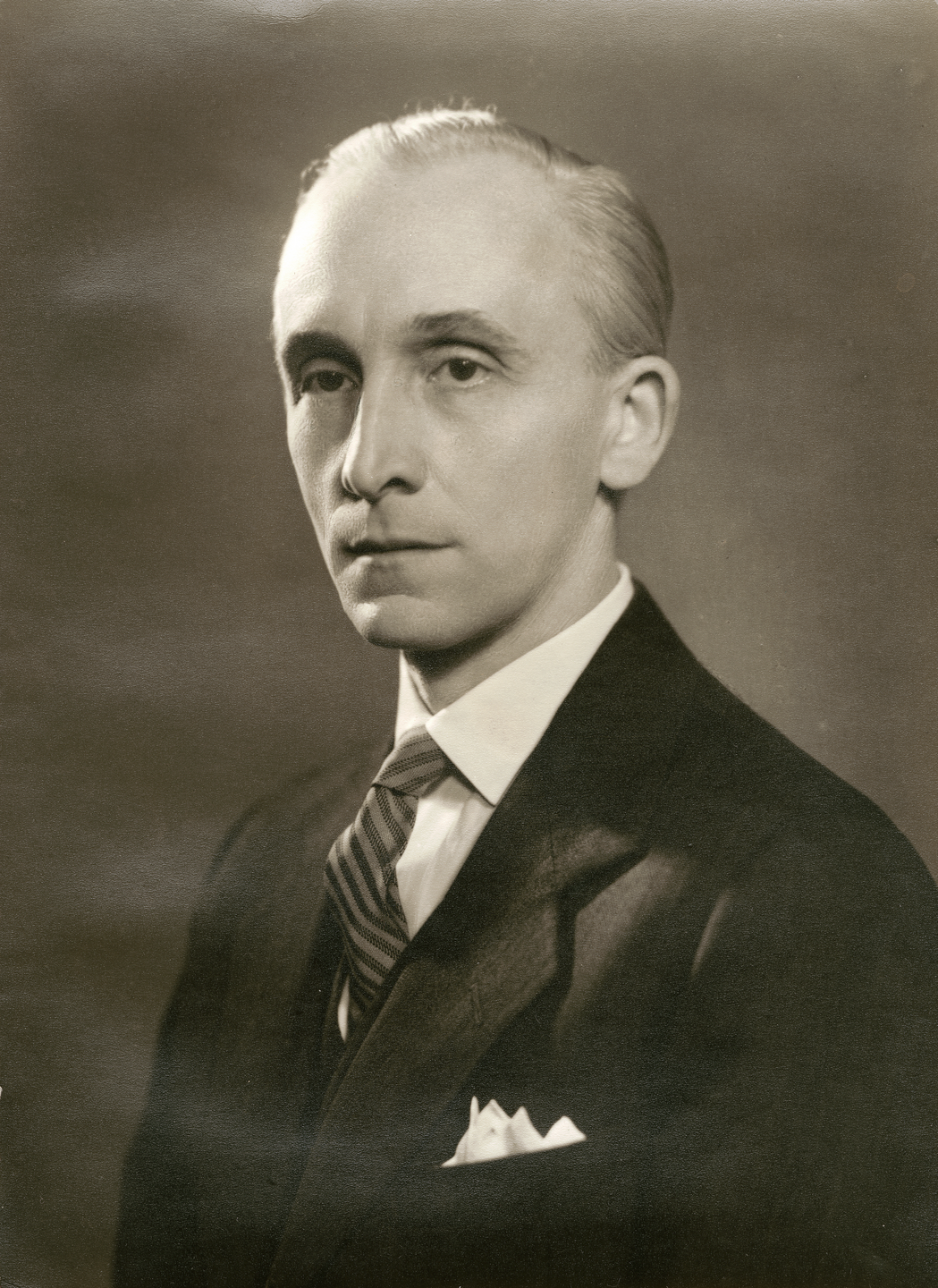
- Bárdossy c. 1941

Prime Minister of the Kingdom of Hungary
- In office 3 April 1941 – 7 March 1942
- Regent: Miklós Horthy
- Preceded by: Pál Teleki
- Succeeded by: Miklós Kállay

Minister of Foreign Affairs of the Kingdom of Hungary
- In office 4 February 1941 – 7 March 1942
- Prime Minister: Pál Teleki himself
- Preceded by: Pál Teleki
- Succeeded by: Ferenc Keresztes-Fischer

Personal details
- Born: 10 December 1890 Szombathely, Austria-Hungary
- Died: 10 January 1946 (aged 55) Budapest, Hungary
- Cause of death: Execution by firing squad
- Party: Party of Hungarian Life
- Spouse: Marietta Braun de Belatin
- Education: University of Budapest (JD)
- Profession: politician, diplomat

László Bárdossy de Bárdos (10 December 1890 – 10 January 1946) was a Hungarian diplomat and politician, and Prime Minister of Hungary from April 1941 to March 1942. He was one of the chief architects of Hungary's involvement in World War II.

Bárdossy was appointed Foreign Minister in January 1941 and, following Pál Teleki's suicide in April 1941, Teleki's successor as Prime Minister of Hungary. Seeking to recover more Hungarian territories lost after the Treaty of Trianon, he pursued a strong pro-German foreign policy; Hungary supported, and subsequently joined Germany's invasion of Yugoslavia. Afterwards, during his office, Hungary became belligerent with the Soviet Union, United Kingdom and the United States.

In March 1942, Regent Miklós Horthy dismissed Bárdossy from the post. Bárdossy then worked with the collaborationist governments, following the German occupation of Hungary in 1944.

After the end of World War II, Bárdossy was found guilty of war crimes and collaborationism by a People's Court, and was sentenced to death. Bárdossy was executed by firing squad on 10 January 1946.

== Early life and diplomatic career ==
Born at Szombathely on 10 December 1890 to Jenő Bárdossy de Bárdos and Gizella Zarka de Felsőőr, Bárdossy completed his secondary education at Eperjes (in present-day Slovakia) and in Budapest. His family were lesser nobility (i.e. considered to be noble, but held no titles, a class that corresponded to the gentry). He trained as a lawyer in Budapest, Berlin and Paris, and learned German, French and English. He began his career in 1913 as an assistant clerk in the Hungarian government's Ministry of Culture and Education, by 1918 was an assistant secretary. Three years later he reached the rank of ministerial secretary, having been commissioner of education for Pest County. In February 1922, he transferred to the newly established Ministry of Foreign Affairs, as deputy chief then chief of the press department. As chief of the press department, Bárdossy reported to György Barcza, the chief of the political department of the Ministry of Foreign Affairs at the time. Barcza came from a more prominent and wealthier aristocratic family than Bárdossy and had a "grand seigneur" attitude towards his social inferiors, which led to embittered relations between the two men. In World War Two, the relationship between Barcza and Bárdossy was to be reversed with Barcza serving as the Hungarian minister-plenipotentiary in London and Bárdossy serving as foreign minister and prime minister.

Intelligent and ambitious, but highly irascible, Bárdossy quickly rose up the ranks of Hungarian diplomacy. In March 1930 he was appointed as a counsellor to the Hungarian legation in London, latterly as chargé d'affaires. His wife was the sister-in-law of the prime minister Gyula Gömbös, which greatly aided his career. Bárdossy's wife was a divorcée, which under the British customs at the time, meant she could not be presented at court before King George V and Queen Mary, a snub that greatly embittered Bárdossy and made him into something of an Anglophobe. From October 1934, Bárdossy was the Hungarian envoy to Romania. The American historian Deborah Cornelius described Bárdossy as a charming, elegant and cultured diplomat, "correct" in his social graces and manners, and considered to be "brilliant" by those who knew him. However, she noted that he was a "proud and sensitive man", impatient with those he considered to be of lesser intelligence, quick to anger, prone to impulsive decision-making and highly secretive and devious.

The aristocracy held over-sized importance within the Kingdom of Hungary as the open ballot along with laws that disfranchised poorer men from voting or holding office (Hungarian women regardless of income level were not allowed to vote or hold office until 1946) allowed the greater aristocracy and the lesser aristocracy to dominate politics. Owing to the disfranchisement of most of the population and the fact that upper-class men were the only ones allowed to vote, the political left was not a factor in Hungarian politics and the main divisions in politics were between a right-wing faction known as the conservatives vs. an even more right-wing faction known as the radicals. The American political scientist Ibrahim Zabad wrote the Regent of Hungary, Admiral Miklós Horthy, managed to "keep a foot in both camps of the right", but he tended to more adopt the rhetoric of the radicals while governing more like the conservatives. Both the conservatives and the radicals favored anti-Semitic policies, but the conservatives tempered their antisemitism by arguing that Hungary needed its Jewish middle class to maintain the economy while the radicals did not. Until his death from testicular cancer in 1936, Gömbös was the leader of the radical faction and Bárdossy was associated with the radicals. Broadly speaking, the office of prime minister tended to alternate between the conservatives such as István Bethlen, Pál Teleki and Miklós Kállay vs. radicals such as Gyula Gömbös, Béla Imrédy and Bárdossy. The British historian C.A. Macartney argued that the way that the prime ministership alternated from 1932 to 1944 between the conservatives and the radicals was clear evidence that Admiral Horthy was the man in ultimate control of Hungary and that Horthy had played a balancing act between the conservatives and the radicals.

== Foreign minister ==
Hungary did not abandon the idea of reuniting the "Lands of the Crown of Saint Stephen" after the Treaty of Trianon. Based on this doctrine, Hungary sought the revision of the treaty, claiming territories from Czechoslovakia, Romania and Yugoslavia, including regions with no significant ethnic Hungarian population, such as Croatia. Between 1938 and 1940, following German–Italian mediation in the First and Second Vienna Awards, and the Hungarian invasion of Carpatho-Ukraine, Hungary enlarged its territory. It absorbed parts of southern Czechoslovakia, Carpathian Ruthenia and the northern part of Transylvania, which the Kingdom of Romania ceded. One of the ethno-cultural areas that changed hands between Romania and Hungary at this time was the Székely Land. The support that Hungary received from Germany for these border revisions meant that the relationship between the two countries became even closer. On 20 November 1940, Hungary formally joined the Axis Tripartite Pact.

To simplify the planned invasion of Greece, Germany and Italy wanted to neutralize Yugoslavia. For this purpose, Germany was ready to guarantee the territorial integrity of Yugoslavia. News of the German offer annoyed Hungary which had already started negotiations with Yugoslavia. At the initiative of Prime Minister Pál Teleki, Hungary and Yugoslavia signed a treaty of eternal friendship and non-aggression on 12 December 1940. The treaty referred to the possibility of the revision of the frontier in favor of Hungary after bilateral negotiations, but Hungary explicitly abandoned her claim to Croatia. Through the treaty, Hungary wanted to offset German pressure and to improve her relationship with the United Kingdom.

When István Csáky died in January 1941, Bárdossy was appointed to replace him as Minister of Foreign Affairs in Teleki's cabinet. From the beginning, Bárdossy agreed with Teleki's approach to foreign affairs, which placed high priorities on Hungarian independence and staying out of World War II. However, unlike Teleki, Bárdossy believed that the war would end in German victory or a negotiated settlement. In February, György Barcza the Hungarian ambassador to Great Britain, advised Bárdossy that the British had broken off diplomatic relations with Romania due to the presence of German troops on its soil, and expressed disquiet over the fact that Hungary had allowed them to transit through Hungary on their way to Romania. Bárdossy replied that Hungary had allowed the transit of German troops at the request of the Romanian government. The British Foreign Office response was that Bárdossy's explanation was just a pretext, as Hungary's actions had enabled Britain's enemy to establish itself in Romania, thus creating a base for further German operations. They further explained that while they understood that Hungary and other smaller nations were in extremis, Britain was trying to extend a level of "understanding and patience" with them beyond usual diplomatic practice. Bárdossy also remonstrated with the Germans regarding the guarantees they had offered the Yugoslavs, emphasising that Hungary had not given up its territorial claims. Consistent with their practice of making conflicting promises to different countries, the Germans replied that Germany recognised Hungary's revisionist claims, and that the assurances offered to the Yugoslavs would not interfere with them.

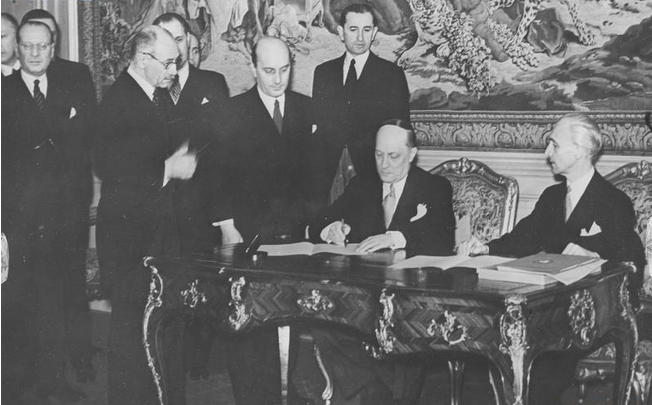
Bárdossy, signing the Treaty of Eternal Friendship between Yugoslavia and Hungary in March 1941

On 27 February, the Yugoslav Foreign Minister, Aleksandar Cincar-Marković, arrived in Budapest to exchange the documents ratifying the Treaty of Friendship, and Teleki and Bárdossy met with him. Cincar-Marković was alarmed by the imminent Bulgarian accession to the Tripartite Pact. In early March, Teleki wrote a long memorandum regarding the expectations that the British and Americans could have of Hungary. He saw his chief responsibility as conserving Hungary's resources to the end of the war, and listed the dangers she faced, one of which was that from Yugoslavia, despite the recently signed Treaty of Friendship. He described as unreasonable the British expectation that small nations such as Hungary should oppose Germany. Despite this, he listed a number of ways in which Hungary had held firm against unreasonable German demands, including her refusal to let German troops transit through Hungary to attack Poland in 1939.

On 4 March, Bárdossy gave a note to the British ambassador reiterating that the transit of German troops through Hungary at been at the request of the Romanian government. In communications with Barcza, his ambassador in London he accused the British of "malice" and "considerable ignorance", and may have allowed his dislike of his ambassador to colour his assessment of the British position. Bárdossy had deeply disliked Barcza since the 1920s when he had to report to him as chief of the press department, and his feelings of personal animosity towards him influenced his assessment of Anglo-Hungarian relations. Furthermore, Barcza was an Anglophile while Bárdossy was an Anglophobe, which was another strain on their relations. On 12 March, Teleki wrote to his ambassador in London, upbraiding the British for "reproaching others for non-resistance", and claiming that the British had failed to bring the nations in the Balkans and Danube basin together, whereby they may have been able to resist the Germans. The ambassador did not receive the letter until late March, and when he went to visit Eden, the Foreign Secretary told him that he expected that Teleki would have to succumb to German pressure sooner or later, but warned that Hungary would have to face the "gravest consequences" if she allowed German troops to pass through her territory to attack a country allied with Britain, and that even worse consequences would accrue if Hungary joined in any such attack.

On 25 March, the Yugoslavs acceded to the Tripartite Pact, but two days later the Yugoslav government was overthrown by a military coup. Adolf Hitler immediately ordered his generals to prepare to attack Yugoslavia, and summoned the Hungarian ambassador to Berlin, Döme Sztójay. Hitler told him that:

- Germany would act to prevent any enemy bases being established against herself;
- if fighting occurred, Germany would not oppose any Hungarian revisionist claims on Yugoslav territory;
- Germany supported Croatian aspirations for autonomy; and
- Hungary might consider taking military action herself.

Hitler offered Croatia to Hungary in a message to Miklós Horthy, Regent of Hungary on 27 March. Horthy was willing to join the planned invasion of Yugoslavia unconditionally, but Bárdossy and Teleki convinced him to reconsider his position. In a letter, he only promised that the Hungarian army would cooperate with the Germans and refuted Hitler's offer about Croatia. However, Sztójay, who took the letter to Berlin on 28 March, made Hitler believe that Hungary would participate in the invasion. Hitler stated that Germany had two friends in the Balkans, Hungary and Bulgaria, promising that their revisionist claims would be satisfied. The same day, Hungary's ministerial council met to discuss the conditions under which the Hungarian army could move into the Yugoslav territories formerly part of Hungary. They agreed this could occur if one of the following conditions were met:

- if Yugoslavia ceased to exist as a state, i.e. if Croatia was to proclaim its independence;
- if the security of the Hungarian minority in Yugoslavia was endangered; or
- if a vacuum was created by German military action in areas occupied by the Hungarian minority.

The following day, Barcza the Hungarian ambassador in London asked for clarification as to whether, in case of a German attack on Yugoslavia, Hungary would uphold the Treaty of Eternal Friendship. Bárdossy wrote back, copying the same message to his ambassador to the United States, stating that there was a very real likelihood that Yugoslavia would disintegrate, and that secession of Croatia and Slovenia would create a situation where Hungary would have to act to protect the Hungarian minority in Vojvodina. Acting under the impression that Horthy's letter had approved such action, Chief of the Hungarian General Staff, General Henrik Werth and his chief of operations, Colonel Dezső László were negotiating with German General Friedrich Paulus, chief of operations of the German Army. The Hungarian high command believed that the Germans needed evidence of Hungary's friendship, and, contradicting the conditions already set, agreed that Hungarian forces could operate outside former Hungarian territories within Yugoslavia.

Horthy called a meeting of the Supreme Defence Council on 1 April. Bárdossy advocated the position that the Hungarian Army should only move into areas of Yugoslavia occupied by the Hungarian minority under the conditions agreed to on 28 March. He said that Germany should be told this, and that any Hungarian action would be independent of the Germans. Minister of the Interior Ferenc Keresztes-Fischer and others agreed, but Werth, and Minister of Defence Károly Bartha pushed for immediate military action on the basis of the letters exchanged between Horthy and Hitler. Teleki then spoke, reminding those present of the enormous resources of Britain and the United States, and saying that Hungary should not take action they would consider unacceptable. He agreed with Bárdossy that it would be acceptable to enter former Hungarian territories in Yugoslavia only after Yugoslavia had collapsed. In the end, the Council adopted resolutions proposed by Teleki and Bárdossy, which modified the conditions agreed to on 28 March. They were that:

- the Hungarian Army would not pass beyond the line formed by the Danube and Drava;
- preparations were to be made to mobilise, but with Horthy making the final decision; and
- all Hungarian units were to be under Horthy's ultimate command, and were not to be subordinated to German command.

On 2 April, the British warned the Hungarian ambassador that if Hungary allowed the transit of the Germans through her territory to attack Yugoslavia, Britain would break off diplomatic relations. They also cautioned Hungary that if she joined the attack on Yugoslavia under any pretext, she must expect Britain and her allies to declare war, and, if that occurred, could expect to be treated appropriately should the Allies be victorious. The British observed that Hungary had renounced its claims on Yugoslav territory when it signed the Treaty of Friendship, and that any attack on Yugoslavia would be a flagrant breach of the treaty. These warnings were passed on to the Hungarian government by telegram.

When Hitler requested clearance to launch one of his armoured thrusts against Yugoslavia using Hungarian territory, Teleki was unable to dissuade the Regent. The Tripartite Act allowed the German Army to be deployed in Hungary's territory.

Concluding that Hungary had disgraced itself irrevocably by siding with the Germans against the Yugoslavs, Teleki shot himself on 3 April. In his suicide note to Horthy, he wrote,

We have become breakers of our word—out of cowardice—in defiance of the Treaty of Eternal Friendship... we have placed ourselves at the side of scoundrels... We shall be robbers of corpses! the most abominable nation.

Horthy informed Hitler that evening that Hungary would abide by the Treaty of Eternal Friendship with Yugoslavia, though it would likely cease to apply should Croatia secede and Yugoslavia cease to exist. He then ordered the mobilisation of two army corps.

== Prime minister ==
=== Invasion of Yugoslavia ===
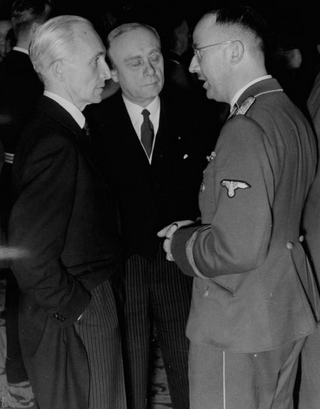
Bárdossy (left) with Ambassador to Germany Döme Sztójay (centre) and Reichsführer-SS Heinrich Himmler (right) in 1941

When Teleki committed suicide, Horthy first offered the prime ministership to Keresztes-Fischer, but when he refused it, Bárdossy was appointed. As prime minister, Bárdossy (who also retained the portfolio of foreign minister) pursued a strong pro-German foreign policy, reasoning that an alliance with the Nazis would allow Hungary to retrieve land that had been taken from it as a result of the Treaty of Trianon. On 6 April, Germany invaded Yugoslavia. Bárdossy and Horthy had agreed to allow the Germans to launch part of their invasion from Hungarian territory.

On 7 April, Yugoslav bombers of British-design launched raids on Hungarian airfields and railway stations. One of the targets was an airfield near Szeged, but when the Yugoslav aircraft found it empty, they dropped their bombs on the railway network. Another formation attacked airfields used by the Hungarian Air Force around Pécs. Both bomber formations were almost completely destroyed by German fighter aircraft and Hungarian anti-aircraft fire. A rumour spread that British aircraft had been involved in these raids, but this was a false report, probably generated by those in the Hungarian military who wanted Hungary to join in the German campaign. Bárdossy lodged a strong protest with the British regarding the supposed British attack. (Note: Some sources state that the Yugoslavs also bombed targets around Siklós)

The Axis puppet Independent State of Croatia was proclaimed on 10 April. Later that day, Horthy issued a directive to the Hungarian Army ordering it to intervene in Yugoslavia to safeguard the Hungarian minority. The Hungarian government used the pretext that Yugoslavia had ceased to exist, and therefore make the claim that Hungary was not invading it — and on that basis the Hungarian Army crossed the frontier on 11 April. On 13 April, the 1st and 2nd Hungarian Motorized Brigades occupied Novi Sad, then pushed south across the Danube into Syrmia capturing the Croatian towns of Vinkovci and Vukovar on 18 April. These brigades then drove southeast to capture the Serbian town of Valjevo a day later. Other Hungarian forces occupied the regions of Prekmurje and Međimurje. The British considered that Bárdossy's claim was a ludicrous attempt to justify the Hungarian invasion of Yugoslavia, with Eden stating that it would remain an "everlasting shame upon the reputation of Hungary" that she had attacked Yugoslavia a few months after concluding a pact of friendship with her. Even so, Churchill did not declare war on Hungary for some months, despite Eden and Stalin urging him to do so. The Hungarian attack on Yugoslavia has been described by the Hungarian historians Miklós Incze and György Ránki as "the most shameful act of wartime Hungarian policy".

Afterwards, Hungarian troops occupied parts of Yugoslav territory that had formerly belonged to Hungary prior to the Treaty of Trianon, and these lands were subsequently annexed by Hungary.

=== War with the Soviet Union ===
On 22 June 1941, Germany attacked the Soviet Union. Four days later, the Hungarian city of Kassa (present-day Košice in Slovakia) was bombed by three unidentified aircraft. One bomb failed to explode and was found to be of Soviet origin. The Hungarian military concluded that the Soviet Union was responsible (this was denied, and the question of responsibility has never been satisfactorily resolved). When Bartha and Werth became aware of the bombing, they went to Horthy who ordered retaliatory measures without consulting Bárdossy.. By the time Bárdossy joined the meeting at the Royal Castle, Horthy had already been convinced by Werth and Bartha that retaliation was the only option open. However, Bárdossy believed that Horthy wanted war with the Soviet Union, so he hurriedly assembled the Council of Ministers. There appears to have been a misunderstanding as Bárdossy believed that Horthy's statement that he wanted "immediate action" meant he wanted a declaration of war while Horthy seemed to have believed that Bárdossy would come back with the council's decision for his approval. In summing up the meeting, Bárdossy said that it was agreed that reprisals were necessary, and, with the exception of Keresztes-Fischer, that they agreed that Hungary was now at war with the Soviet Union. Keresztes-Fischer argued that Bárdossy should only declare war if Germany requested such a step. The three ministers who spoke the most strongest for war at the meeting were the Defense Minister Károly Bartha, the Education Minister Bálint Hóman and the Finance Minister Lajos Reményi-Schneller. Bárdossy told the council that Hungary would send only a minimal force to fight on the Eastern Front and the war would be more symbolic than real for most Hungarians. He did not tell the council that his "summing up" of the cabinet discussion was the legal equivalent of a binding resolution. The following day, Bárdossy stood up in Parliament and declared the attack had been made by the Soviet Union, and that the government had decided that a state of war existed between Hungary and the Soviet Union. Horthy subsequently claimed that Bárdossy had presented him with a fait accompli.

In so doing, he violated Hungary's constitution, which required the prime minister to receive the consent of Parliament before declaring war. On 27 June 1941, Bárdossy appeared before the Lower House to accuse the Soviet Union of bombing Kassa and announced: "Thus the Hungarian Royal Government decided that as a result of the attack a state of war exists between Hungary and the Soviet Union". Bárdossy was the man of the hour and his declaration of war was greeted with loud cheering and clapping by the MPs and no MP challenged him on what he had just done The rest of the parliamentary session was taken up with debating if the Social Democrats should be banned and if the Hungary needed another anti-Semitic law. Endre Bajcsy-Zsilinszky, the leader of the opposition Smallholders, sent Bárdossy a note congratulating him for "standing up" for Hungary by declaring war. Amongst the more well-off sections of society, the declaration of war on the Soviet Union was extremely popular and Bárdossy was widely praised for declaring war. However, only 28% of Hungarians had an income level high enough to allow them to vote. Amongst the other 78% who were disfranchised for being poor, the prospect of war was not received with much enthusiasm. The war was especially unpopular in rural areas. Military service meant calling up peasants serving as reservists, which left woman in charge of the farms and the children while their husbands were at war.

Herbert Pell, the American minister-plenipotentiary in Budapest described Bárdossy as "very cultivated man with a great deal of diplomatic experience but extremely weak", adding he was a vain, ambitious man whose insecurities made him into a braggart. One Hungarian diplomat described Bárdossy, saying he "was an ultra-anti-Bolshevik anti-Semite and believed that harmonious cooperation with Germany was a historical necessity". The Chief of the General Staff, the extreme pro-Nazi General Henrik Werth, saw Operation Barbarossa as a chance to rid Hungary of all its minorities. Werth bombarded the cabinet with memos calling for all of the Jews, Romanians and Slovaks living under Hungarian rule to be expelled into the Galicia region of the Ukraine. In early July 1941, Werth appeared before the cabinet requesting that all of the Jews of "Polish and Russian citizenship" living under Hungarian rule be expelled as illegal immigrants into Galicia, a request that Bárdossy approved. However, Bárdossy refused Werth's request to expel all of the Jews under Hungarian rule, saying that those Jews who could not prove that they were Hungarian citizens would be expelled.

During the summer of 1941, Bárdossy received numerous complaints from Pell that the Jews who were being expelled as illegal immigrants from Hungary into the Galicia were being massacred. Pell told Bárdossy that his claims to be expelling illegal immigrants was wrong as many of the Galician Jews who had settled in the Ruthenia region were refugees and that his policies were "a violation of the right of asylum which is generally granted by sovereign countries to refugees". About 18, 000 Jews, some of whom were indeed Galicians, but others who were Hungarian citizens wrongly identified as illegal immigrants went by freight train to Galicia. All 18, 000 men, women and children were shot down by the SS in a massacre at Kamnets-Podolsk between 27 and 28 August 1941. Bárdossy constantly lied to Pell, claiming that there were no massacres and that the people being expelled into Galicia were being well treated. Besides for Pell, Bárdossy also received complaints from Hungarian officials about the massacre with one writing to him: "The fact that lawful Hungarian citizens are being expelled by the thousands from the country will undermine the internal and international confidence in the Hungarian legal system...It is not a Jewish interest, but a Hungarian national interest that the Hungarian officials who are responsible for these resettlements, about which hundreds of letters and telegrams provide testimony describing the dreadful horrors resembling Dante’s inferno, put an end to it. If for no other reason, the Hungarian nation’s thousand-year-old Christian reputation should not be tarnished by it." In October 1941, Bárdossy in a speech to the Diet stated: "Following the capture of Ukrainian territory, we have transferred a significant number of Jews, originally from Galicia. We wanted to evacuate even larger number, but our German friends warned us not to continue for the time being. Naturally, we had to yield to this request."

=== War with Great Britain and the United States ===
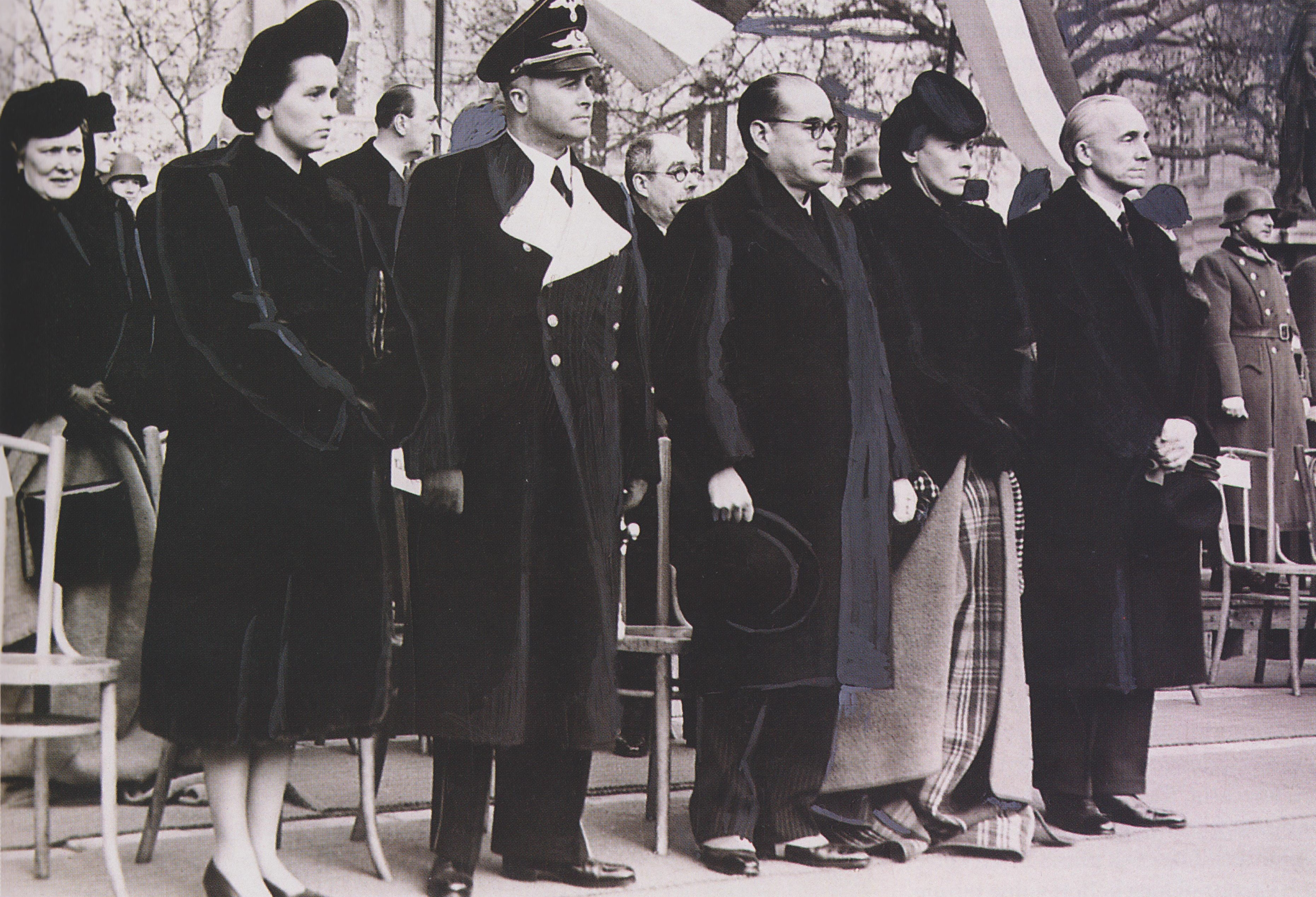
Bárdossy standing on the right reviewing a parade on 6 December 1941. Bárdossy's wife is standing to his left. The German minister-plenipotentiary Dietrich von Jagow is standing second from the left.

In late November 1941, Britain delivered an ultimatum to Hungary, stating that if it did not withdraw its forces from the Soviet Union by 5 December, Britain would declare war. As Britain had broken off diplomatic relations in April 1941, the United States served as the protecting power for Britain in Hungary and as such Herbert Pell, the American minister-plenipotentiary, also represented the United Kingdom. Pell delivered the ultimatum to Bárdossy, who rejected the terms outright, saying in a rather arrogant fashion that Hungary would not be dictated by Great Britain. As Bárdossy was fluent in English, he and Pell spoke in that language and thus there was no mistranslations. Pell offered to send a message to Britain, saying it was possible that he could influence Eden and Churchill to alter the deadline, but Bárdossy told Pell he had nothing to say to the British. Pell reported that he tried his best to find a compromise to prevent a British declaration of war, which was hindered by Bárdossy adopting a tone "aggrieved innocence" as he professed himself to be a victim of British bullying.Bárdossy took no action to comply, so a state of war came into effect at midnight on 6 December. The following day, the Japanese launched their attack on Pearl Harbor. Four days later, Germany declared war on the United States on 11 December 1941. Bárdossy was reluctant to follow suit, despite German expectations that Hungary would do so as a member of the Tripartite Pact. In an attempt to avoid a declaration of war, the Council of Ministers proposed breaking off diplomatic relations and expressing solidarity with the Axis powers.

György Barcza wrote in his diary: "Pell said yesterday evening he had been with Bárdossy, who visibly agitated, had informed him Hungary was breaking off relations with America. Pell, who is a good friend of ours, told me that he had tried to feed Bárdossy, as an explanation for the communiquė, the suggestion being that under foreign pressure, the Hungarian government had no option, but Bárdossy had interrupted him and replied in a raised voice there was no question of foreign pressure. The government was breaking off diplomatic relations with the United States independently of the others, of its own free will. Pell tried again to make an impression on Bárdossy, as he would have liked to contrive that when he presented himself to report, he could tell Roosevelt something in favor of Hungary along the lines that having been placed under terrible German pressure and duress, we were compelled to break relations with the USA. But Bárdossy did not want to take Pell's well intentioned hint and stuck by his assertion that there was no question of foreign influence on us; the step had been decided by the government and that was all there was to it." Bárdossy first told Pell that his declaration of Axis solidarity did not mean war with the United States, but then the next day on his own authority sent a message to the Hungarian legations in Berlin, Rome and Tokyo saying if the Axis powers wanted the declaration to be a declaration of war, it could be so interpreted.

Breaking off diplomatic relations not satisfy the Germans or Italians, who made their expectations clear. Finally, realising that he would be unable to get approval from Parliament or Horthy for a declaration of war, Bárdossy announced a state of war with the United States at a parliamentary foreign affairs committee on 15 December. Bárdossy's main critic when he announced the declaration of war was Miklós Kállay who had not opposed the declaration of war on the Soviet Union, but objected vehemently to the declaration of war on the two "Anglo-Saxon" powers. Pell at his final meeting with Bárdossy to receive the declaration of war offered him a way to downplay what had just been done, saying: "I suppose you are doing this under heavy pressure from Germany, and that the declaration reflects no hostility on the part of the Hungarian people towards the USA?" Pell wanted to be able to tell Roosevelt and the American people that Hungary had not wanted to declare war on the United States, and should be seen as a reluctant Axis power. Bárdossy rejected Pell's attempt at an albibi for Hungary, saying: "Hungary is a sovereign and independent state...Her government and her people are entirely at one".

=== Domestic policies ===
On matters of domestic policy, Bárdossy proved to be an advocate of radical right-wing politics. In the part of the Bácska region annexed to Hungary, Bárdossy issued a degree ordering that all Romany (Gypsies) living there who could not prove that they were citizens of Austria-Hungary as of 31 October 1918 to be expelled. The same degree stated that Romany born after 31 October 1918 were to be expelled as well. An anti-Semite, Bárdossy enacted the Third Jewish Law in August 1941, which severely limited Jewish economic and employment opportunities and prohibited Jews from marrying or having sexual intercourse with non-Jews. Bárdossy also approved the policy of deporting non-Hungarians from the territory seized from Yugoslavia, and authorized the slaughter of thousands of Jews in Újvidék (modern Novi Sad, Serbia). The parts of Yugoslavia that had been annexed to Hungary were placed under military rule and as such the Honved generals had control over the local police forces along with the units of the Royal Hungarian Gendarmerie stationed in Yugoslavia instead of the Interior Ministry under Keresztes-Fischer as normally would have been the case. Werth as chief of the general staff had an oversized role in ruling that annexed regions which were governed under martial law rather regular civilian law. Werth as a "Swabian" (the name for the volksdeutsche of the Banat) took a special interest in the Bácska, which was close to the Banat where he had grown up. Werth presented plans that called for as the first step expelling all 150, 000 Serbs living into the Bácska into Serbia. Ultimately, Werth favored expelling not only all the Serbs, but also all of the Jews, Romany and Romanians living in the Bácska as well with only the Magyars and the volksdeutsche being allowed to remain. Bárdossy told Horthy that Werth's plans for the Bácska were "fantastical" as Werth envisioned uprooting millions of people to achieve his vision of ethnically pure greater Hungary. However, Bárdossy approved of Werth's plans to bring in ethnic Magyars from the Bukovina region of Romania as settlers to help "Magyarise" the region.

By a degree issued by Bárdossy on 12 July 1941 all Jews living in Hungary who could not prove their Hungarian citizenship were expelled into the German-occupied Ukraine. He had long claimed that Hungary was being overwhelmed with illegal Jewish immigrants from other Eastern European nations, especially from the Galicia region (modern western Ukraine and southeaster Poland) and the Hungarian police and gendarmes were ordered to expel all Jews who could not prove they were born Hungarian citizens under the grounds that they must be illegal immigrants. Many of the Jews expelled were not illegal immigrants, but merely Hungarian citizens who unable to prove to the satisfaction of the police and gendarmes that they were not illegal immigrants. In a two day orgy of killing between 27 and 28 August 1941 in Kamianets-Podilskyi, all of the expelled Jews were shot by the SS, Ukrainian collaborators and the sappers of the Honvéd (Royal Hungarian Army) that saw between 14, 000-16, 000 people killed.

Like his predecessor Teleki, Bárdossy had difficult relations with Werth, who he charged was an insubordinate soldier who acted like he was above taking orders from civilian authority. Werth wanted a "total war" against the Soviet Union along with converting the peacetime economy to a wartime economy, and told the council of ministers several times in the summer of 1941 that Bárdossy was not doing enough. On 26 August 1941, Bárdossy sent a letter to Horthy saying that Werth's insubordination had reached such a point that he was going to resign as prime minister if Horthy did not sack Werth. Horthy had largely depended on military advice from Bartha and Werth and was not certain if he could find a replacement for Werth. Horthy's oldest son, István Horthy, had met while serving on the Eastern Front, Ferenc Szombathelyi, and recommended to his father that Szombathelyi be the next chief of the general staff. In September 1941, Horthy following the advice of his son, sacked Werth and made Szombathelyi his successor.

In the part of the Bácska newly annexed to Hungary from Yugoslavia known as the Délvidék (known as Vojvodina to the Serbs) the Partisans were active, and in December 1941 Bárdossy charging that the Hungarian gendarmes were unable to handle the guerrilla war, deployed the 5th Corps of the Honvéd under the command of General Ferenc Feketehalmy-Czeydner to the Délvidék. There was some guerrilla activity in the Bácska, but the Hungarian authorities had killed far more people in retaliation. Between April-September 1941, 126 Hungarian soldiers and gendarmes had been killed in Serb guerrilla attacks in the Bácska and another 246 had been wounded while the Hungarian authorities had executed 3, 000 Serbs in retaliation. Over the course of December 1941-January 1942 the Honvéd were involved in massacres of Jews and Serbs, most notably the Novi Sad raid. On 12 January 1942, the chief of the General Staff, Ferenc Szombathelyi, ordered Feketehalmy-Czeydner to conduct a razzia in Újvidék, claiming that the Chetniks were moving into the Bácska from Serbia. A few days later, Endre Bajcsy-Zsilinszky, an influential opposition politician with many connections to the Honved met with Bárdossy to warn him of an impeding massacre in Újvidék. Bajcsy-Zsilinszky starkly warned Bárdossy of a "bloodbath" being planned in Újvidék by Feketehalmy-Czeydner along with the Defense Minister Károly Bartha and the chief of the general staff, Ferenc Szombathelyi, and begged Bárdossy to stop the massacre. Bajcsy-Zsilinszky in particular warned that the officers in charge were planning to kill as many Serbs and Jews as possible under the guise of an anti-guerrilla razzia and were not going to spare women and children, which Bajcsy-Zsilinszky stated would "disgrace" Hungary and weaken its efforts to revise the Treaty of Trianon. Ever since the wars against the Ottoman Empire in the Middle Ages, the Hungarians had fashioned a romantic self-image of themselves as being a uniquely virtuous people whose values were shaped by Christianity, chivalry and honor as the Hungarians saw themselves as the noble defenders of "European Christian civilization" against Islam. Many outsiders were inclined to accept the Hungarian romantic self-image of themselves as being based on reality, which was a major reason why Bajcsy-Zsilinszky objected so strenuously to the planned massacre as being in opposition to the values that the Hungarians professed to hold. Bárdossy dismissed Bajcsy-Zsilinszky's warnings saying that both Bartha and Szombathelyi had given their word as Hungarian officers and gentlemen that no woman and children would be killed in the planned anti-guerrilla sweep.

Erich Kampf, the German consul in Szeged (the headquarters of the 5th Corps) happened to be a very good friend of Feketehalmy-Czeydner who assured him that the volksdeutsche (ethnic Germans) of Újvidék had nothing to fear as the operation was being carefully planned so that no Magyars or volksdeutsche would be killed. Germany saw itself as the special protector of all the volksdeutsche communities in Eastern Europe and any killing of the volksdeutsche in the Bácska would had seriously strained Hungarian-German relations. Kampf's reports to Berlin in January 1942 stressing that Feketehalmy-Czeydner had promised him that no volksdeutsche would be harmed strongly supports the conclusion that the massacre was premediated and planned.

Between 21 and 23 January 1942 between 3, 000-5, 000 people in Újvidék who were mostly Serbs or Jews were rounded up under the guise of a raizza and were taken out to be shot down in cold blood. A number of Russian émigrés who had fled the Communist regime in the Soviet Union had settled in Novi Sad in the interwar period who also taken out to be executed in the massacre under the highly unlikely grounds that they were Communists. Likewise, the Romany of Újvidék were rounded up to be executed. The city that the Hungarians called Újvidék was known as Novi Sad to the Serbs. The city of about 64, 000 people was ethnically mixed in the interwar era with the Serbs being in the majority, a third of the population being Magyars, a tenth of the population being volksdeutsche (ethnic Germans) and less a tenth of the population being Jewish. Novi Sad was one of the most industrialised and modern cites in the Balkans, a major river port on the Danube river and a key link in the railroad linking Vienna to Istanbul, making control of the city a major concern for the government in Budapest. The problem of a guerrilla activity in the Bácska been greatly exaggerated by the Hungarian authorities as a relatively small number Hungarian soldiers and gendarmes had been killed in guerrilla attacks by the Chetniks or the Partisans since the city had been annexed to Hungary in April 1941, and the main reason for the massacre was the desire to "Magyarise" an ethically mixed city.

The fact that women and children were not spared was considered scandalous when the news of the massacres appeared in the Hungarian newspapers in late January 1942. The interior minister, Ferenc Keresztes-Fischer, demanded in a public letter that the Chief of the General Staff, General Ferenc Szombathelyi, investigate the massacres. The investigation was stopped by the personal order of Admiral Horthy in August 1942, but was later restarted in September 1943. At a trial in December 1943-January 1944, General Feketehalmy-Czeydner along with several other Honvéd officers were convicted of the Újvidék massacre with Feketehalmy-Czeydner being sentenced to 15 years in prison. The trial of Feketehalmy-Czeydner set an important precedent for Bárdossy's later trial in 1945 as the Feketehalmy-Czeydner trial established the massacres were illegal under the laws of the Kingdom of Hungary, which was used to rebut the claims of Bárdossy's lawyers that he was faced with nulla poena sine lege charges (i.e. being charged with a criminal offense that did not exist in the law at the time of the alleged offense).

== Later life and execution ==
On 7 March 1942, Horthy forced Bárdossy's resignation in favour of the more moderate Miklós Kállay. Exactly why Horthy decided to remove Bárdossy is unclear, but some possible reasons include Bárdossy's unwillingness to stand up to Germany, his compliancy to Hungary's far-right and growing increasing Hungarian troop levels and casualties in the Soviet Union. Perhaps the primary reason that Horthy dismissed Bárdossy, however, was that Bárdossy successfully opposed a plan by Horthy that would have elevated his son, Miklós Jr, to the regency after Miklós Horthy's death. After resigning as prime minister, Bárdossy became chairman of the Fascist United Christian National League in 1943. After the German occupation of Hungary in 1944, Bárdossy and his followers collaborated with Prime Minister Döme Sztójay. Later on, they collaborated with Ferenc Szálasi's Arrow Cross Party. He fled from Szombathely due to Soviet advance in Hungary and moved initially to Bavaria, then to Innsbruck. He obtained entry visa to Switzerland on 24 April 1945 and lived briefly in a refugee camp. However, the Swiss government deported him back to Germany on 4 May 1945. He was immediately arrested by the Americans.

After World War II ended, Bárdossy was extradited to Hungary on 3 October 1945. He was tried by an extrajudicial People's Court between 19 October 1945 and 3 November 1945. The Hungarian historian Peter Kenez wrote of all the Hungarian leaders brought to trial for war crimes, Bárdossy "...was the most able to present a coherent and sympathetic defense. He conducted himself with dignity. He was a well educated man who spoke several languages. He assumed responsibility for his actions without considering himself guilty. He sparred with the prosecutors with intelligence and a better knowledge of recent history than his prosecutors. He defended his actions based on the need to repair the damage done by the Trianon treaty". Kenez argued that Bárdossy made a favorable impression on the stand as he defended his actions as prime minister, but "he deserved his punishment was not in question". Of the other Hungarian leaders brought to trial for war crimes, the former prime minister Béla Imrédy, the former prime minister Döme Sztójay, the former interior minister Andor Jaross along with his two undersecretaries László Baky and László Endre, and the former prime minister Ferenc Szálasi all made considerably worse impressions in their trials than did Bárdossy. The leader who made the very worst impression was Szálasi, whom Kenez described as being quite "mad" on the stand as he made strange and bizarre statements in his defense that made sense only to himself.

A major charge against Bárdossy was the massacre of the Jews expelled into Ukraine in the summer of 1941. Bárdossy testified that he believed that all about 18, 000 Jewish men, women and children expelled from Hungary were illegal immigrants and that he had no idea that some of those expelled were Hungarian citizens. He claimed that he was "politically responsible" for the deportations as he had signed the orders on 12 July 1941 for the deportation of all Jewish illegal immigrants in Hungary, but was not criminally responsible as he maintained that he had no idea that the SS was going to kill all of the Jews expelled from Hungary. Bárdossy presented himself as a Hungarian patriot was trying to solve the problem of Jewish illegal immigration from Galicia by sending all of the illegal immigrants back to Galicia who was ignorant of the ultimate plans of the SS to exterminate all of the Jewish men, women and children, saying he would never had sanctioned the deportations had he known of what was being planned. Presented as evidence against Bárdossy's claims of ignorance were the formal protests he had received from Pell in the summer of 1941 along with the complaints from his officials about the genocide in Galicia. Especially damning evidence was Bárdossy's repeated statements to Pell that none of his officials had seen any evidence of ill treatment or killings in Galicia while in fact Bárdossy's was being bombarded at this time by numerous complaints from his own officials about what was happening in Galicia.

On the charges of aggression against Yugoslavia, Bárdossy testified that there was no Yugoslavia to wage aggression against as the NDH (Nezavisna Država Hrvatska-Independent State of Croatia) had been proclaimed in Zagreb on 10 April 1941, the same day that Hungary invaded Yugoslavia. As such, he argued that Yugoslavia had already ceased to exist and therefore Hungary had not committed aggression against Yugoslavia. About the massacre in Novi Said in January 1942, Bárdossy testified that the Defense Minister Károly Bartha told him that only a "defensive action" had been executed against guerrillas that had not targeted "all the Serbian people" living in Novi Sad. After he learned of the massacre, Bárdossy testified that he ordered the chief of the general staff, General Ferenc Szombathelyi, to investigate while summoning General Ferenc Feketehalmy-Czeydner in person to explain to him what had happened. Bárdossy testified that both Szombathelyi and Feketehalmy-Czeydner had "satisfied" him with their explanations and he took no more action besides for ordering a "through investigation". Bárdossy testified that Szombathelyi had told him that the Honved were not involved in the massacre and that "the gendarmerie were responsible for everything", which in his mind absolved him of any responsibility as prime minister for the massacre. He concluded that testifying that his successor as prime minister, Miklós Kállay, had framed him for the Novi Said massacre, saying he was no way responsible for what happened in January 1942. On the charges of responsibility for the Novi Sad massacre, Bárdossy was acquitted with the judges ruling that the prosecution had failed to present sufficient evidence that Bárdossy knew in advance that a massacre had been planned. Bajcsy-Zsilinszky who might had testified that he warned Bárdossy of a massacre being planned in Novi Sad in January 1942 had been executed in December 1944. The memo that Bajcsy-Zsilinszky had submitted to Bárdossy was not known at the trial in 1945. However, Bárdossy was found guilty of failing to bring to justice the perpetrators of the Novi Sad massacre. Bárdossy was found guilty of aggression against Yugoslavia as the People's Tribunal ruled that Hungary had signed the Kellogg–Briand Pact of 1928 which had outlawed aggressive war. His thesis that Yugoslavia had ceased to exist by the time Hungary had invaded was rejected as the judges noted that the NDH was a sham and that the Royal Yugoslav Army was still resisting the German invasion on 10 April 1941 as Yugoslavia did not surrender until 17 April 1941. He was found guilty of war crimes and collaboration with the Nazis, sentenced to death, and executed by firing squad in Budapest on 10 January 1946.

His execution was photographed by Lee Miller.

== Appraisal ==
Bárdossy took over his roles as foreign minister and prime minister at a critical moment in Hungary's history. Despite the importance of Britain, he did not really understand the British, and was "rather contemptuous, dismissive and at times condescending" towards them. His poor relationship with Barcza, the Hungarian ambassador to London probably contributed to this. He maintained Teleki's foreign policy priorities without fully identifying with them. His appointment as prime minister was much more acceptable to the Germans than Keresztes-Fischer. Bárdossy was a contradictory character who did not always comprehend the geo-political situation Hungary found herself in, especially vis-à-vis Britain. His accusation that the British had bombed Hungary on 7 April 1941 was one of several significant political blunders, as was the announcement of a state of war with the Soviet Union in June 1941, and with the United States in December 1941.

== Footnotes ==
Political offices
Preceded by Pál Teleki	Minister of Foreign Affairs; 1941–1942	Succeeded by Ferenc Keresztes-Fischer; Acting
Preceded by Ferenc Keresztes-Fischer; Acting	Prime Minister of Hungary; 1941–1942	Succeeded by Ferenc Keresztes-Fischer; Acting
