= Kádár =

Kádár (Hungarian, 'cooper', Hungarian pronunciation: [ˈkaːdaːr]) is a Hungarian surname which may refer to:

- Ján Kadár, Slovak-Hungarian film director
- János Kádár (1912–1989), Hungarian politician, top leader during the communist era
- Flóra Kádár (1928–2002), Hungarian actress
- Kálmán Kádár, Romanian water polo player of Hungarian descent
- Matthias Kadar, a composer of German-Hungarian descent
- Tamás Kádár, Hungarian footballer
- Zoltán Kádár, Romanian footballer of Hungarian descent
- Gyula Kadar, Hungarian military officer during world war two

== See also ==
- Kadar (disambiguation)
- Kádár (Hun judge)
- Kádár is the Hungarian name for Cadăr village, Tormac Commune, Timiș County, Romania
