= Kadar =

Kadar may refer to:

== People ==
=== First name ===
- Kadar Brock (born 1980), American contemporary abstract artist
- Ka'dar Hollman (born 1996), American football player
- Kadar Khan, an alternate spelling of Kader Khan (born 1935/1936), Indian actor

=== Last name ===
- Danny Kadar (born 1969), American producer, engineer, and mixer
- Gyula Kadar (disambiguation), several people
- János Kádár (1912–1989), Hungarian communist party and government leader
- M. A. Kadar (born 1942), Indian politician
- Muhammad Kadar, Singaporean convicted murderer

== Places ==
- Kadar, Russia, a rural locality near Karamakhi in the Republic of Dagestan, Russia
- Kādar, alternative spelling of Kodur-e Bala, a village in Kerman Province, Iran

== Other ==
- Kadar language, a Dravidian language of Kerala and Tamil Nadu
- Kadar people, one of the scheduled tribes of India
- Kadar dialect, dialect of Northern Dargwa

== See also ==
- Kádár, a Hungarian surname
- The Night of Kadar, 1978 science fiction novel by Garry Kilworth
- Pakoda Kadhar, Indian film actor
