= 1998 Rajya Sabha elections =

Elections for the upper house of Indian Parliament

(of 228 seats) to the Rajya Sabha
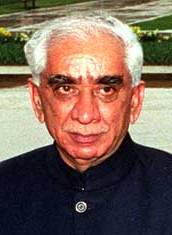

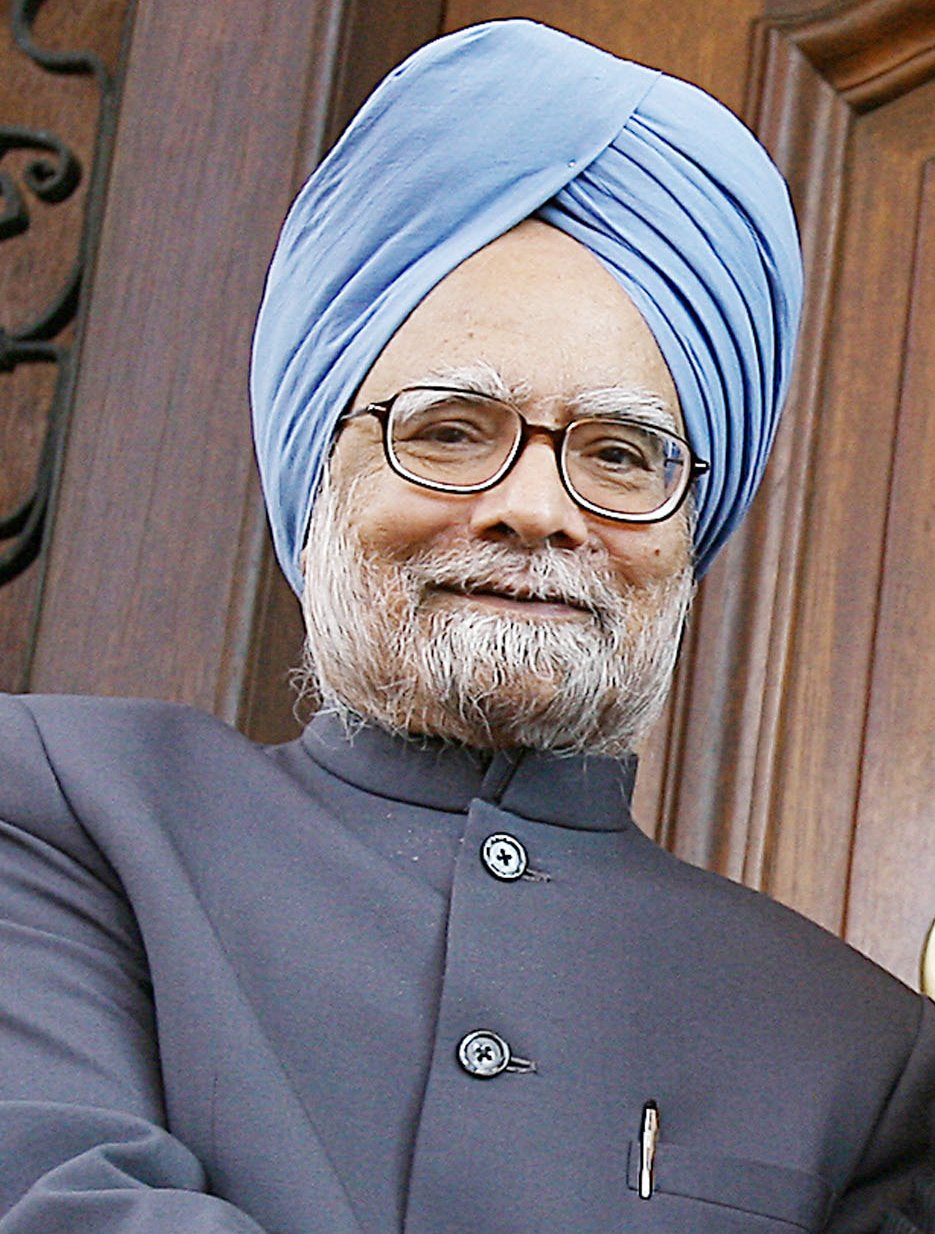
	First party	Second party
Leader	Jaswant Singh	Manmohan Singh
Party	BJP	INC

Rajya Sabha elections were held in 1998, to elect members of the Rajya Sabha, Indian Parliament's upper chamber. 13 members from 6 states and 57 members from 14 states were elected.

== Elections ==
Elections were held in 1998 to elect members from various states. The list is incomplete.

=== Members elected ===
The following members are elected in the elections held in 1998. They are members for the term 1998–2004 and retire in year 2004, except in case of the resignation or death before the term.

Rajya Sabha members for term 1998–2004
State	Member Name	Party	Notes
Assam	Dr Arun Kumar Sarma	AGP	R
Assam	Drupad Borgohain	CPI	
HP	Anil Sharma	INC	
KL	M.J. Varkey Mattathil	CPM	
KL	A Vijaya Raghvan	BJD	
NG	C. Apok Jamir	INC	
TR	Matilal Sarkar	CPM	
PB	Ashwani Kumar	INC	
PB	Lajpat Rai	INC	
PB	Sukhbir Singh Badal	SAD	
PB	Sukhdev Singh Dhindsa	SAD	
PB	Gurcharan Singh Tohra	SAD	dea 01/04/2004
AP	Desari Nagabhushan Rao	INC	
AP	Yadlapati Venkata Rao	TDP	
AP	P. Prabhakar Reddy	TDP	
AP	K K Venkata Rao	TDP	
AP	C. Ramachandraiah	INC	
AP	R Ramachandraiah	TDP	
KA	Oscar Fernandes	INC	
KA	Venkaiah Naidu	BJP	
KA	H.K. Javare Gowda	JD	
KA	S. R. Bommai	JD	
CG	Dilip Kumar Judev	BJP	
CG	Jhumuklal	INC	
MP	O. Rajagopal	BJP	
MP	Balkavi	BJP	
MP	Mabel Rebello	INC	
TN	S. Agniraj	DMK	
TN	V. Maitreyan	ADMK	
TN	M. A. Kadar	DMK	
TN	M. Sankaralingam	DMK	
TN	S. Sivasubramanian	INC	
TN	Viduthalai Virumbi	DMK	
TN	G. K. Moopanar	TMC	dea 30/08/2001
OR	Manmathnath Das	BJP	
OR	Ramchandra Khuntia	BJD	
OR	Ranganath Misra	INC	
MH	Pritish Nandy	SS	
MH	Satish Pradhan	SS	
MH	Pramod Mahajan	BJP	
MH	Vijay J. Darda	INC	
MH	Najma Heptulla	INC	res 10/06/2004
MH	Suresh Kalmadi	INC	res 10/06/2004 LS
PB	Sukhdev Singh	INC	
PB	Gurcharan Kaur	INC	
RJ	Jaswant Singh	BJP	
RJ	Laxmi Mall Singhvi	INC	
RJ	Santosh Bagrodia	INC	
UP	Arun Shourie	BJP	
UP	Kanshi Ram	BSP	
UP	Lalit Suri	IND	
UP	Dinanath Mishra	BJP	
UP	B. P. Singhal	BJP	
UP	Khan Gufaran Zahidi	INC	
UP	Rama Shankar Kaushik	SP	
UP	Ram Gopal Yadav	SP	
UP	Dharam Pal Yadav	SP	
UP	Syed Akhtar Hasan Rizvi	SP	
UP	T. N. Chaturvedi	BJP	res 20/08/2002 Govr of KA
UP	Sangh Priya Gautam	BJP	fr UP till 08/11/2000
BR	Kapil Sibal	INC	
BR	Ramendra Kumar Yadav	Samta Party	
BR	Gaya Singh	CPI	
BR	Saroj Dubey	RJD	
BR	Anil Kumar	INC	
JH	Parmeshwar Agarwalla	INC	
JH	Abhay Kant Prasad	BJP	
HR	Swaraj Kaushal	BJP	
HR	Rao Man Singh	INC	

== Bye-elections ==
The following bye elections were held in the year 1998.

- Bye-elections were held on 27-03-1998 for vacancy from West Bengal due to death of seating member Tridib Chowdhury on 21-12-1997 with term ending on 18-08-1999. Abani Roy of RSP got elected.
- Bye-elections were held on 27-03-1998 for vacancy from Karnataka and Jammu and Kashmir due to election to Lok Sabha of seating member H D Deve Gowda on 01-03-1998 with term ending on 09.04.2002 and Saifuddin Soz on 01-03-1998 with term ending on 22.11.2002.
- Bye-elections were held on 27-03-1998 for vacancy from Orissa and Kerala due to election to Lok Sabha of seating member Jayanti Patnaik on 02.04.2002 with term ending on 09.04.2002 and K.Karunakaran on 01-03-1998 with term ending on 21.04.2003. C. O. Poulose of CPM won from Kerala.
- Bye-elections were held on 27-03-1998 for vacancy from Gujarat due to resignation of seating member Anandiben Patel on—with term ending on 02.04.2000.
