= Ferenc Szombathelyi =

Hungarian military officer

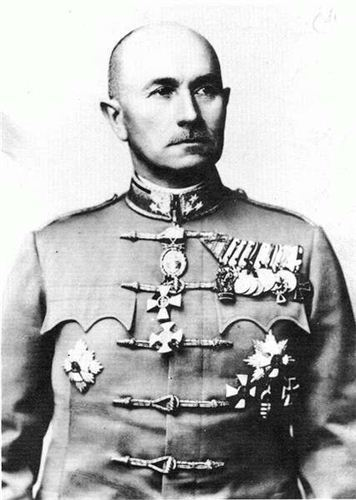
- Born: Ferenc Knausz or Ferenc Knauz; 17 May 1887; Győr, Győr County, Kingdom of Hungary
- Died: 4 November 1946 (aged 59); Petrovaradin, SAP Vojvodina, SR Serbia, SFR Yugoslavia
- Cause of death: Execution by firing squad
- Military career
- Allegiance: Austria-Hungary; Hungarian Soviet Republic; Hungary
- Branch: Austro-Hungarian Army; Hungarian Red Army; Royal Hungarian Army
- Service years: 1902-1944
- Rank: Vezérezredes (Colonel General)
- Conflicts: World War I Hungarian-Romanian War; World War II

Ferenc Szombathelyi (17 May 1887 – 4 November 1946), born Ferenc Knaus or Ferenc Knauz, was a Hungarian military officer who served, from September 1941 to April 1944, as Head of the General Staff of the Royal Hungarian Army during World War II.

== Military career ==
Knaus joined the Austro-Hungarian army as a cadet in 1902 and was subsequently promoted to lieutenant in 1907 in the 16th Infantry Regiment. From 1911, he studied at the Kriegsschule (military academy) in Vienna and was promoted to captain at the age of 28. After participating in World War I as a staff officer he joined the newly founded Royal Hungarian Army. Like most senior Honved officers, he was a "Swabian" as the Hungarian volksdeutsche (ethnic Germans) were known (most of the families of the Hungarian volksdeutsche were believed to have originated from the Swabia region of Germany). Of the 27 senior two star and three star generals in the Honved in 1941, 21 were volksdeutsche. German was the language of command in the Imperial Austrian and Royal Hungarian Army, and as such Hungarian volksdeutsche tended to fare well as officer candidates as German was their first language, unlike the Maygar officer candidates who had to learn German.

From 1926 he taught at the Ludovica Military Academy in Budapest. From 1931 to 1933, he was Chief of Staff of the 3rd Mixed Brigade, after which he served as adjutant of the high command of the armed forces in 1935–36. In 1938, he became the commander of the Ludovica Military Academy. From 1934 onward, he used his mother's maiden surname of Szombathelyi rather than his own given surname of Knaus in order to sound more Magyar. Unlike most Honved officers who tended to be Germanophiles, Szombathelyi was a Francophile who greatly appreciated and loved French culture. Szombathelyi was described as being "tough" but "sensitive" soldier, known for his interests in history, fine wine and excellent food. A superb horsemen and an amusing raconteur who cut a dashing figure, Szombathelyi was famed within the Honved as a great womanizer. Szombathelyi's womanizing added to his reputation in an army where an officer's name was measured as much by the number of women he slept with as by the number of battles won. Besides for his native German, Szombathelyi was fluent in Magyar and French.

In 1938–39 he held the post of Deputy Chief of Staff. The second anti-Jewish law of 1939 imposed serious problems as he was not able to authenticate that neither he nor his wife had no Jewish blood owing to a lack of documentation, through he was eventually to convince his superiors that both he and his wife were of purely Christian descent. From 1939 to 1941, he commanded the VIII Corps before he was appointed commanding general of the "Carpathian group" (Kárpát Csoport), with which he took part in Operation Barbarossa. Unlike most of the other Honved officers who greeted Operation Barbarossa with joy, Szombathelyi was less than enthusiastic. Before embarking for the Soviet Union, Szombathelyi was heard to say: "What will come of this, good Lord! What will come of this? Did we really need this; to jump into this stupidity?" In August 1941 while commanding the Carpathian Group, Szombathelyi met István Horthy, the eldest son of the Regent Miklós Horthy who was already grooming him to be his successor. The younger Horthy was greatly impressed with Szombathelyi as an unusually intelligent officer. Through István Horthy, Szombathelyi was able to get into contact with the Regent. Szombathelyi later recalled: "At the beginning of September 1941 I handed the Regent a memorandum, the essence of which was that the Russian war would not be a 'Blitzkrieg', but rather a long drawn out, bloody struggle, the results of which were completely uncertain. Our troops, if possible, should be withdrawn before we plunger further into this war". In private, Szombathelyi told his colleague Gyula Kádár, whom he was to appoint chief of military intelligence in 1942, that "you know, we don't have an army, but a badly equipped poor peasantry". Despite being a fellow volksdeutsche, Szombathelyi was often in conflict with the chief of the general staff, Henrik Werth. Szombathelyi later recalled: "Since the high ranking officers and generals were completely pro-German, I was under their supervision to a certain extent...I knew that changing the attitude of the leaders had to be done step by step, and I often felt that I had come too later to change the poisoned attitude".

On 6 September, he was appointed by Regent Miklós Horthy to succeed the pro-German Henrik Werth as Chief of General Staff. Szombathelyi assessed the prospects of war with the Soviet Union sceptically and did not hesitate to share this view with his German counterparts. Shortly after his appointment he was present at a meeting between Adolf Hitler and Horthy in Vinista when the latter promised to provide more troops. He successfully delayed this measure until it could no longer be avoided following German Army setbacks in the winter of 1941-42 and the increased commitment of Romania. On 29 December 1941, Hitler wrote to Horthy asking for more Hungarian forces to the Eastern Front for the 1942 campaign. Because of the Wehrmacht's heavy losses during the 1941 campaign in the Soviet Union, it was not possible for Germany to hold a line going from the Arctic Ocean to the Black Sea and launch a major offenisve, leading to demands for Germany's allies such as Romania, Italy, Hungary and Finland to contribute far more troops for the 1942 campaign. In response, Szombathelyi stated: "If up to now their attitude to us had been that if we wanted to take part in the war at any cost then let us take part, now at the end of 1941 they suddenly turned the voluntary participation into an obligation".

The German foreign minister Joachim von Ribbentrop arrived in Budapest to demand that Hungary send virtually the entire Honved to fight on the Eastern Front, and noted that Marshal Ion Antonescu of Romania had already promised 16 more Royal Romanian Army divisions for the 1942 campaign on the Eastern Front. Ribbentrop warned the prime minister László Bárdossy that Germany could always reverse the Second Vienna Award of 1940 and give northern Transylvania back to Romania, which had proved itself a more worthy German ally than Hungary. Bárdossy promised Ribbentrop that Hungary would make a greater contribution to the Eastern Front to match Romania's efforts in exchange for not giving northern Transylvania back to Romania. On 20 January 1942, Field Marshal Wilhelm Keitel, the chief of the Oberkommando der Wehrmacht arrived in Budapest for talks with the Defense Minister Károly Bartha and Szombathelyi about the precise scale of the contribution. Keitel wanted almost of the Honved sent to the Eastern Front, a demand that Szombathelyi resisted. However, Szombathelyi later stated: "We might had lost our independent Hungarian army, lost our independent state". On 22 January 1942, Szombathelyi signed an agreement with Keitel promising to send the 2nd Hungarian Army that consisted of 207, 000 men organised into 9 infantry brigades, 1 armored division and various support troops to the Eastern Front no later than April 1942.

in response to alleged attacks by communist partisans and Chetniks in the annexed Bácska, in January 1942 ordered a military intervention by General Ferenc Feketehalmy-Czeydner, which evolved into punitive action against Serb-inhabited villages and culminated in the massacre of Újvidék (present-day Novi Sad, Serbia). Szombathelyi asked Feketehalmy-Czeydner what had happened at Újvidék and claimed that he believed his denial of the massacre, saying that he could not imagine that an officer and a gentleman who been his classmate at the Ludovica Academy had lied to him. In his memoirs written shortly before his execution in 1946, Szombathelyi wrote:

"Most Hungarians and almost all of the extreme right and the officers corps' viewed the events at Újvidék...as a National Heroic act...Public opinion was completely under the influence of rightist propaganda and formed their opinions. I myself did not believe that the Újvidék events were so terrible. For a long time, I did not believe it. And if I never fell into that error that the events were heroic, for a long time, I was convinced that the troops had taken harsh, but justified reprisals at Újvidék to put an end to the atrocities of the Serbs, who had carried out numerous actions against Hungarian public safety and security forces as well as train bombings. I completely believed the reports of the responsible commanders, Colonel General Ferenc Feketehalmy-Czeydner and Lieutenant General Józef Grassey, who I knew as upstanding trustworthy soldiers. In word and writing they denied to me that any uncalled bloodletting had occurred. To the extent that any excess had occurred, it was provoked by the conduct of the Serbian population. I never was able to receive a report on the number or make-up of the victims, but they denied that there were women and children among the victims. I believed I faced the exaggerations of the civil administration. On the basis of this belief, as well as the international situation, but above all German relations, and the Serb massacres against each other, the German and Croat situation...I did not consider the time favorable to uncover such a mess, which would disturb the country's peace. I was too young a Chief of Staff to go into such a fight alone...On the government's request, I put the matter aside".

To provide soldiers for the 2nd Army, Bartha and Szombathelyi changed the conscription process. In 1941, the Hungarians used their traditional system of calling up all of the eligible men in certain districts. In late January 1942, Bartha and Szombathelyi changed the conscription system to only call up 20% of the eligible men in all the districts of Hungary while leaving the other 80% behind to continue their civilian lives. Szombathelyi and Bartha wanted to avoid a repeat of the end of World War One where almost all of the Honved were serving on the Italian Front, which allowed Romania and Czechoslovakia to seize much of Hungary, and planned their new system of conscription to ensure that there would still be men to defend Hungary from Romania. However, the new system of conscription proved to be a political disaster as it provoked widespread resentment with those 20% of those called up for national service were angry that other 80% of the men in their neighborhoods and workplaces were not being called up. Bartha and Szombathelyi also mostly sent older reservists to the 2nd Army while leaving behind the younger and fitter men who would be needed for the expected war with Romania. As most of the older reservists called up for national service with the 2nd Army were married with children, this provoked much resentment. Furthermore, Szombathelyi and Bartha decided that 20% of those sent to the 2nd Army be non-Magyars with the majority being ethnic Ukrainians from Ruthenia and ethnic Romanians from northern Transylvania. Between January–April 1942, Szombathelyi worked feverishly to prepare to send the 2nd Army to meet the deadline he had promised Keitel. Szombathelyi gave lectures to the officers attached to the 2nd Army about his own experiences of fighting the Red Army in 1941. In April 1942, he sent the Second Army of Gusztáv Jány to the Eastern Front.

In August 1942 as the 2nd Army attempted to seize bridgeheads along the river Don, Szombathelyi spent a request to the OKW asking the line that 2nd Army was holding along the Don to be shortened and to supply the Hungarians with mobile artillery as their own horse-drawn artillery took too long to move. Both requests were refused. In early September 1942, Szombathelyi visited the 2nd Army as it engaged in the bridgehead battles along the Don. Szombathelyi during his visit found that the 2nd Army had taken heavy losses during the bridgehead battles; that there major shortages as it took too long to bring up supplies from trainheads to the frontlines via horse-drawn wagons; that most of the soldiers were going hungry owing to a lack of food; and most of the horses attached to the 2nd Army had staved to death owing to a lack of fodder. Szombathelyi was forced to tell Jány that he had no solutions as the 2nd Army was going to have remain in Russia for the coming winter of 1942-1943 and he did not see any way to improve the logistical situation. Upon his return to Budapest on 5 October 1942, Szombathelyi submitted a grim report to the Supreme Military Council headed by Horthy. Szombathelyi stated that Operation Blue, the German plan to defeat the Soviet union in 1942, had already failed, and the war on the Eastern Front would go on for several more years. He stated the situation of the 2nd Army was extremely serious, but that the 2nd Army would have to remain along its lines along the river Don at least until 1943. Recalling the events that followed the dissolution of the Austrian empire in October 1918, Szombathelyi stated that no more Hungarian forces should be sent to the Eastern Front and the main concern should be the defense of Hungary, especially the lands annexed between 1938-1941. However, Szombathelyi failed to envision a Soviet victory on the Eastern Front and expected the German-Soviet war to end in a compromise peace as he believed that neither Germany nor the Soviet Union were capable of defeating each other. Given his belief that the war was going to in a compromise peace, Szombathelyi felt that the main focus should be on ensuring that Hungary's territorial gains should be recognised at the expected peace conference. Szombathelyi was more concerned about a possible war with Romania and planned to carry out a slow replacement of the men serving in the 2nd Army.

As the elite German 6th Army was encircled starting on 19 November 1942 in Operation Uranus, Szombathelyi felt that the situation for the Axis on the Volga river was impossible and favored the withdrawal of the 2nd Hungarian Army, a request that Horthy refused. On 27 December 1942, Szombathelyi in the name of the Horthy as the Supreme Warlord issued an order to General Gusztáv Jány, the GOC of the 2nd Army, ordering his soldiers to fight to the death along the Don river. Szombathelyi's order read "no one is allowed to retreat; there is no backward, only forward!" On 12 January 1943, the Red Army opened an offensive against the 2nd Hungarian Army and 15 January Jány was begging Szombathelyi for permission to retreat, saying his entire army was on the brink of annihilation and retreat was the only option. In response to the catastrophic defeats of the second Army in the winter of 1942-43, Hungary increasingly tried to distance itself from its Axis partners. The destruction of the 2nd Army came as an immense shock in Hungary. Newspapers in Hungary had reported nothin but victories since the beginning of Operation Barbarossa in June 1941, which made the news of the loss of the 2nd Army all the more disturbing and frightening.

On 12 February 1943, Szombathelyi met Adolf Hitler and reported to Horthy afterwards that Hungary's future was not bright, saying there was a real possibility the Soviet Union would defeat Germany. He added: "We have to reckon that during the spring the Anglo-Saxon powers will attempt a landing in the Balkans...Hitler is of the opinion that such a landing is very probable". Szombathelyi also reported that Hitler had blamed the Hungarians for the catastrophic German defeat at the Battle of Stalingrad, saying that the Hungarian 2nd Army was supposed to hold the flank of the German 6th Army, but instead collapsed in the face of the Red Army's offensive. Hitler told Szombathelyi that the Hungarians were useless as soldiers and he seriously regretted allowing the Hungarians to serve on the Eastern Front, a statement Szombathelyi said he agreed with, saying he never wanted Hungary to send an expeditionary force to the Eastern Front. Szombathelyi's proposal to use Hungarian divisions to occupy the Balkans as a substitute for the failure of the second Army was welcomed by Hitler but rejected by Prime Minister Miklós Kállay. Contacts with the Western powers were initiated, with Kállay and Szombathelyi playing leading roles.

In July 1943, Kállay ordered Szombathelyi to start an investigation into the massacre at Újvidék with a military judge-advocate leading the investigation beginning in September 1943. When the officers involved led by Feketehalmy-Czeydner were brought to trial in December 1943, Szombathelyi insisted upon a trial before the regular court of the general staff. Szombathelyi claimed to have believed Feketehalmy-Czeydner's statements in 1942 that there was no massacre because he was a Hungarian officer and gentleman, and professed very shocked to have discovered that a fellow officer would lie to him. Szombathelyi later wrote: "When the painful reality hit, I finally took action and energetically. I could almost say that I made the whole matter mine. I took it upon my shoulders-therefore I placed it before the Court of the General Staff. In order to do this I raised the charge to treason, although my prosecuting attorney did not consider that correct. I did not want to pass off this horrible matter to others. To place on anyone else's shoulders, although the minister of interior warned me that this did not come under the authority of the Chief of Staff-it was not a matter of treason but of public murder and robbery. I feared that in other hands the verdict would be drawn out and might get lost".

In September 1943, the director of military intelligence, Gyula Kádár, sent the Hungarian military attaché to Bulgaria, Ottó Hátszeghy, to the Turkish city of İzmir, ostensibly to attend a trade fair. In İzmir, Hatz met with agents of the American Office of Strategic Services (OSS), the precursor of the Central Intelligence Agency. On 8 October 1943, Hatz arrived in Budapest to meet Kadar. Kádár then took Hatz with him to meet Szombathelyi. Szombathelyi in turn met with Kállay and Horthy who gave their approval for him to maintain contact with the OSS. The American historian Deborah Cornelius claimed that Szombathelyi worked as a spy for the OSS from October 1943 onward, delivering to the OSS intelligence about the German war effort. In a memo dated 20 November 1943, the director of the OSS, William J. Donovan, claimed that Szombathelyi was working as an OSS agent. However, Szombathelyi at his trial in June 1945 admitted to having contacts with the OSS, but denied having worked as a spy, saying that as a Hungarian officer and a gentlemen that the murky business of espionage was beneath him. In December 1943, Colonel Sándor Homlok, the Hungarian military attaché to Germany, revealed to Ribbentrop that the Hungarians were conducting talks with the Americans in Turkey, which caused the Hungarians to proceed more slowly in their talks with the OSS. The talks with the OSS in Turkey were broken off on 14 February 1944 largely because the OSS would not give Kállay the commitment that he sought, namely a written promise that the United States would occupy Hungary before the Soviet Union.

In January 1944, Szombathelyi visited Hitler at the Wolfsschanze (Wolf's Lair) headquarters located deep in the forests of East Prussia. Szombathelyi requested permission to pull the Hungarian Expeditionary Force out of the Soviet Union to guard the passes to the Carpathian mountains, a request that was rejected out of hand as Hitler did not believe that the Red Army would be capable of advancing as far west as the Carpathians. On 15 March 1944, Horthy was invited by Dietrich von Jagow, the German Minister plenipotentiary, to see Hitler at the Schloss Klessheim palace to discuss his request to pull all Hungarian troops out of the Soviet Union in order to defend Hungary. Hitler in the letter that Jagow gave to Horthy also explicitly stated that he wanted Szombathelyi, the Defense Minister Lajos Csatay, and the Foreign minister Jenő Ghyczy to come, but not Kállay. On the morning of 16 March, Horthy, Kállay, Csatay, Szombathelyi and Ghycz gathered to discuss the request. Kállay was against the meeting, warning that it was a trap. Horthy seemed to accept Kállay's thesis and planned to send Szombathelyi alone to see Hitler. Szombathelyi refused to go alone and insisted that Horthy came along, saying that only Horthy would be able to persuade Hitler to allow the Hungarians to pull all their troops out of the Soviet Union. Against Kállay, Szombathelyi stated it would be "madness" for Hitler to use the summit as a trap and that Horthy had to go because he had since 1919 "shouldered every burden for the nations' sake". Horthy agreed to go to the Schloss Klessheim with the guests that Hitler requested and to leave Kállay in charge in Budapest. On 17 March 1944, Horthy, Szombathelyi, Csatay and Ghycz left on a train for the [Schloss Klessheim.

At the summit, Horthy was told by Hitler that he could either accept an occupation of his country or see an invasion that would lead to Hungary being partitioned between Romania, Slovakia and Croatia. Szombathelyi played a major role in convincing Horthy to accept the former as preferable to the latter. As the German troops rolled into Hungary, Szombathelyi gave orders to the deputy chief of staff, General Jósef Bajnóczy, that there no be resistance and nothing should be done until he returned to Budapest.

After the German invasion of Hungary in March 1944, Szombathelyi was removed from office and placed under house arrest at German insistence, and retired in April. He was arrested in October 1944 after the Arrow Cross Party assumed power. Szombathelyi was deported to Germany toward the end of the war, then taken into custody by the Americans, who, however, turned him over to Hungary shortly thereafter. At his trial, he was allowed to wear his general's uniform along with his medals. He told the court "but the greatest cross was the one on my shoulders. How could I lead this little country out of this senseless war?" He was convicted by the Hungarian people's court and sentenced to ten years' imprisonment. To prevent his extradition to Yugoslavia, the National Council increased his sentence to life imprisonment. Afterwards, he was extradited to Yugoslavia. On 4 November 1946, in Petrovaradin (Hungarian: Pétervárad), Vojvodina, Szombathelyi was executed by a firing squad. Hungarian writer Tibor Cseres in his book "Vengeance in Bácska" states that Szombathelyi was impaled, but there is no conclusive evidence of this.

== Awards and decorations ==

1st row	Order of Merit of the Kingdom of Hungary Grand Cross on war ribbon with swords	Golden Military Merit Medal on war ribbon with swords	Order of Merit of the Kingdom of Hungary Commander's Cross with Star	Order of Merit of the Kingdom of Hungary Officer's Cross
2nd row	Order of the Iron Crown (Austria) 3rd Class with war decoration and swords	Military Merit Cross 3rd Class with war decoration and swords	Silver Military Merit Medal on war ribbon with swords	Bronze Military Merit Medal on war ribbon with swords
3rd row	Hungarian Bronze Military Merit Medal	Hungarian World War I Commemorative Medal	Long Service Crosses for Officers 1st class	Decoration for Services to the Red Cross 2nd Class with war decoration
4th row	Transylvania Commemorative Medal	Fire Cross 1st class with wreath and swords	Mobilization Cross 1912/13	Iron Cross 2nd Class (1939–1945)
Badge	Badge of the Order of Vitéz			

== Books and articles ==
- FERENC SZOMBATHELYI – HEAD OF THE GENERAL STAFF OF THE HUNGARIAN ROYAL ARMY, Thesis of University Doctorate (PhD) Dissertation by József Kaló; accessed 24 January 2018.
- Cornelius, Deborah S. (2011). Hungary in World War II Caught in the Cauldron. New York: Fordham University Press. ISBN 9780823237739.
- Földi Pál: A Magyar Királyi Honvédség a második világháborúban, Anno Kiadó, 2000; ISBN 978-963-375-221-0
- Földi Pál: Horthy tábornokai, Anno Kiadó, 2007, Debrecen; ISBN 978-963-375-487-0
- Dombrády Lóránd: Szombathelyi Ferenc a népbíróság előtt HM Hadtörténeti Intézet és Múzeum Line Design, 2007.
- Györkei Jenő: Idegen bírák előtt. Szombathelyi Ferenc újvidéki pere és kivégzése. Zrínyi Kiadó, Budapest, 2002.
- Janos, Andrew (2012). The Politics of Backwardness in Hungary, 1825-1945. Princeton: Princeton University Press. ISBN 9781400843022.

Military offices
Preceded by General Henrik Werth	Chief of the General Staff; 1 September 1941 – 19 April 1944	Succeeded by Colonel-General János Vörös
