= Ottó Hátszeghy =

Hungarian fencer (1902–1977)

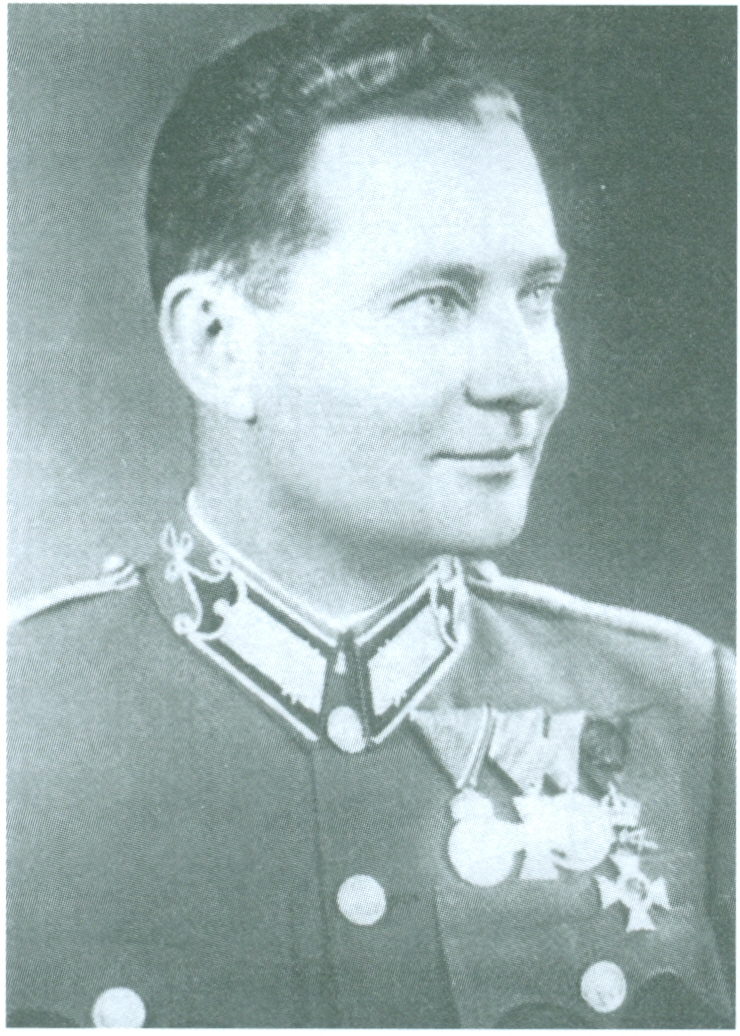

Personal information
- Born: 26 May 1902 Bijeljina, Austria-Hungary
- Died: 21 July 1977 (aged 75) Budapest, Hungary

Sport
- Sport: Fencing

Ottó Hátszeghy (26 May 1902 – 21 July 1977) was a Hungarian épée and foil fencer. He competed at the 1928 and 1936 Summer Olympics.

== Fencer ==
Hátszeghy was born in and grew up in Bosnia-Herzegovina to an aristocratic Hungarian military family. At the time, Bosnia-Herzegovina, while nominally a vilayet (province) in the Ottoman empire had been occupied by Austria-Hungary since 1878 and to all purposes was a province in the vast Austrian empire. In 1908, the colonial status of Bosnia-Herzegovina was made official when Austria-Hungary formally annexed Bosnia-Herzegovina, which became the last province of the Austrian empire. His parents were Adolf Hatz and Anna Reimann. The Hátszeghy family were Magyar lesser nobility (i.e nobility without titles), a class that corresponded by the English gentry. Besides for his native Magyar, he was fluent in German, Russian, and Bulgarian as well speaking some English and French. After the dissolution of the Austrian empire in 1918, his family returned to Hungary. His brother, József Hátszeghy, was also an officer and a fencer.

From 1920 to 1924 he attended the Ludovica Academy. From 1926 to 1928 he attended the Honvéd Miklós Toldi Sports Instructor Course, where he obtained a fencing master's certificate. Between 1929-1932, he attended the Honvéd Military Academy and graduated as an officer. While serving as a member of the Honvéd Tiszti Vívó Club, Hátszeghy served as a member of the Hungarian national fencing between 1928 to 1937. He competed as part of the Hungarian national team at the 1928 Summer Olympics in Amsterdam. Hátszeghy came in third in the European fencing championships in 1929 in Naples, second in the 1931 championship in Vienna and second again in 1933 championships in Budapest. From 1930 to 1936, he was 8 times part of the Hungarian team championship in épée and foil. He was the Hungarian national champion in épée in 1932, 1933 and 1934.

In 1934, he joined the Honved (Royal Hungarian Army) and became an officer on the General Staff. The Israeli historian Yehuda Bauer described Hátszeghy as an excellent fencer and a Hungarian "patriot" who held to the typical right-wing views of a Hungarian officer of his generation. Hátszeghy like most other Honved officers of his time fancied himself a "gentleman" and adopted the usual persona of a Honved officer, always attentive to women and willing to challenge to fight any man who was felt to have insulted his honor. He competed as a fencer at the 1936 Summer Olympics in Berlin.

== Spy ==
After the Axis invasion of Yugoslavia in April 1941, he had returned to Bosnia-Herzegovina in an attempt to recruit Bosnian Muslims for the Hungarian Army. Starting in 1941, Hátszeghy served as the Hungarian military attaché to Bulgaria. During this time, Hátszeghy maintained contacts with MI6 and Polish agents in Turkey and served as a courier between Polish refugees in Hungary and the Polish government-in-exile. At the same, Hátszeghy also kept Otto Wagner, the Abwehr (German military intelligence) chief in Sofia, informed about his meeting with the British and Polish agents. It remains unclear if Hátszeghy was just covering himself in case his contacts with the British and the Poles were discovered by the Germans and if he was a double agent. In the summer of 1943, Hátszeghy had been ordered by his superior Gyula Kádár, the director of military intelligence, to make contact with British and American intelligence. Hátszeghy used as his contact, Bandi Grosz. Grosz was an unsavory career criminal from the Ruthenia region in Eastern Europe. Ruthenia had belonged to Czechoslovakia until 1939, had briefly been independent for a few days in March 1939 as Carpatho-Ukraine, and then had been annexed to Hungary. Grosz after being convicted of several offenses, mostly related to smuggling in both Czechoslovakia and Hungary, had started to work as an agent for the G-2 (Hungarian military intelligence) in August 1942 in exchange for being allowed to continue to run his smuggling network that ran from Istanbul to Budapest. As he had a lengthy criminal record going back to 1930 and was facing life imprisonment after his latest conviction, Grosz proved all too willing to accept the offer to work for the G-2 in August 1942. Despite being Jewish, Grosz seemingly had no issues with working as a spy for the anti-Semitic government of Hungary as all that mattered to him was avoiding prison and being allowed to continue his criminal activities. Grosz in return started to contact both British and American officials about setting up a meeting with Hátszeghy. Grosz introduced Hátszeghy to a MI6 agent and Teddy Kollek, the future mayor of Jerusalem, who was serving as an intelligence agent for the Jewish Agency in Istanbul.

In September 1943 Hátszeghy received an invitation to attend an international trade fair in İzmir and to see the American pavilion. Several of the American officials at the pavilion were known to be agents of the Office of Strategic Services (OSS), the precursor of the Central Intelligence Agency. Kádár gave Hátszeghy permission to attend the trade fair. The two OSS agents whom Grosz introduced to Hátszeghy at the trade fair were Archibald Coleman and Alfred Schwartz, aka Agent Dogwood. The latter was a Czech Jewish businessman living in Istanbul who largely run the OSS spy networks in the Balkans starting in July 1943. Afterwards, Hátszeghy used his contacts made at the trade fair to meet OSS agents in Istanbul to discuss improving American-Hungarian relations. On 29 September 1943, the OSS gave Hátszeghy a memo saying that no political issues could be discussed under any circumstances, but that if Hungary co-operated fully with the United States in intelligence and military matters, the Americans would remember that at the peace conference expected at the end of the war. On 8 October 1943, Hátszeghy arrived in Budapest to tell Kádár that the OSS had given him a radio along with a codebook for communicating. Hátszeghy said if the Hungarians wanted to show that they were open to talking to the Americans, Hungarian state radio should air at 8 pm on three successive days radio broadcasts that included the phrase "İzmir Fair". Kádár hid the OSS radio set that Hátszeghy had gave him in the piano of his mistress, the actress Katalina Varga-Karady.

Kádár arranged for Hátszeghy to meet the chief of the general staff, General Ferenc Szombathelyi, who in turn arranged for Hátszeghy to meet the prime minister, Miklós Kállay. As a former general staff officer, both Szombathelyi and Kádár already knew Hátszeghy well. On three successive days, Hungarian state radio aired the message "According to Turkish press reports the Smyrna fair resulted in a complete Hungarian success" (Smyrna was the former name of İzmir) and that "We hope that in the future Hungarian-Turkish commercial relations will continue to improve". The message was repeated three times at 10 minutes intervals in German, French and English. Afterwards, Hátszeghy was transferred over to Turkey as military attaché. Hátszeghy met numerous times in the winter of 1943-1944 with OSS agents attached to the American embassy in Ankara and the American consulate in Istanbul. Hátszeghy passed along to the OSS intelligence related to the war on the Eastern Front along with a map of Hungary showing possible locations for American soldiers to land at. Speaking of behalf of Szombathely, Hátszeghy offered to the OSS detailed intelligence about the Wehrmacht and its operations on the Eastern Front.

The Hungarian-American talks floundered on different objectives. The OSS was primarily interested in intelligence about the Axis war efforts while the Hungarians wanted a binding commitment that the United States would occupy Hungary before the Soviet Union did. Kállay in particular wanted a written promise that the United States would occupy Hungary first, which the OSS agents refused under the grounds that they had no power to make such a promise, saying that their duty was to gather intelligence and questions of grand strategy were matters for President Franklin D. Roosevelt to decide. Furthermore, Kállay's demand that Hungary be allowed to keep all of the territories gained between 1938-1941 also posed problems, not the least of which were Czechoslovakia and Yugoslavia had governments-in-exile that were recognized as being Allied powers. The American position was that Hungary should return to the frontiers established by the Treaty of Trianon and would not be rewarded for being a German ally by allowed to keep the territories gained in 1938-1941.

On 18 December 1943 in a meeting in Istanbul, Hátszeghy was presented with a draft agreement by the OSS which limited the Hungarian-American relationship to intelligence sharing and explicitly stated that the OSS had no power to make any promises about which of the Allied armies would occupy Hungary first. Hátszeghy was told that Kállay had until 7 January 1944 to sign the agreement. Kállay did not meet the 7 January deadline, but the talks were not broken off. At the same time, Hátszeghy was working as a double agent, being in contact with Wagner, and told him about his meetings with the OSS. Hátszeghy claimed to Wagner that Kollek had tried to recruit him to spy against Germany in October 1943. Accordingly to Wagner: "Hatz [Hátszeghy] met two Englishmen, of whom he thought travelled constantly from Istanbul to Cairo. His name sounded something like Kellock [Kollek]. Both of these men tried in a rather clumsy confidential fashion, to induce Hatz to engage in espionage against the Reich. He refused bluntly". On 14 December 1943, Hátszeghy met Adolf-Heinz Beckerle, the German minister plenipotentiary to Bulgaria and gave him a full account of all dealings with the OSS since September. Beckerle sent a report of his meeting with Hátszeghy to Berlin, which it was obtained by Fritz Kolbe, a diplomat with the Auswärtiges Amt and a secret OSS agent. Koble in turn sent Beckerle's report to the OSS station chief in Bern, Allen Dulles. Dulles became convinced that Hátszeghy was a double agent and in a report sent on 2 January 1944 to William J. Donovan, the OSS chief, wrote: "Hatz [Hátszeghy] is reliably pro-German. However, he is short of funds and has numerous affairs with women. There is also an unconfirmed report to the effect that he is in touch with the Jews who are paid by Hungarian military intelligence and that he shares in the profits he makes from smuggling currency". Hátszeghy's role is highly controversial and historians still debate just who precisely Hátszeghy was really working for.

Kállay sent Hátszeghy and Kádár to Munich, where on 9 January 1944 they met Admiral Wilhelm Canaris, the chief of the Abwehr. Hátszeghy told Canaris that he had made contacts with the OSS and wanted permission to deepen the relationship, claiming that the OSS give the Axis powers intelligence about the Soviet Union in exchange. Canaris refused the request. On 1 February 1944, Hátszeghy returned to Sofia to tell Wagner that Kádár had ordered him to meet the OSS one last time to tell them the Hungarians were breaking off the talks. He once again gave a full account of all his meetings with the OSS and mentioned that the Americans also knew that he had been speaking to both Wagner and Beckerle. The Israeli historian Yehuda Bauer wrote that Hátszeghy had just revealed, albeit indirectly, that the Americans were reading the German diplomatic codes since there was no other way for the Americans to know of his contacts with Wagner and Beckerle, but all of the German officials involved missed the significance of his remarks. Lanning "Packy" Macfarland, the Chicago banker turned OSS station chief in Istanbul, had been warned several times by Donovan not to talk to Hátszeghy anymore because he was a double agent, orders that Macfarland ignored. On 22 January 1944, Macfarland met with Hátszeghy to discuss military co-operation. Hátszeghy promised Macfarland that Hungary would switch sides and join the Allies the moment that Allied armies were in a position to offer support. To facilitate the talks, Hátszeghy agreed to accept the unconditional surrender forumula of the Allies in return for the Allies treating Hungary like an Axis occupied country and a promise that no government would be imposed on Hungary in defiance of the popular will.

On 5 February 1944, Macfarland wrote back to Donovan claiming that he was only seeking military intelligence from Hátszeghy and it was MI6 that was responsible for the political content with Hátszeghy. On 14 February 1944, Hátszeghy demanded that the OSS appoint an official familiar with and sympathetic towards Hungary to handle the talks, which the OSS took as a sign that the Hungarians were breaking off the talks. On 22 February 1944, Hátszeghy contacted the OSS with a letter from Kállay, saying he had reluctantly accepted the American terms along with a map of Hungary showing all of the airfields where the OSS could land teams of agents. On 27 February 1944, Hátszeghy held his last meeting in Istanbul with Macfarland. The OSS agreed to send in a three-man team into Hungary in Operation Sparrow. The OSS team landed in Hungary on 15 March 1944, just in time to be captured in the German invasion of Hungary on 19 March 1944. On 17 April 1944, the Gestapo following a tip found the radio set hidden in the piano of Varga-Karady, which led to Kádár's arrest. The Gestapo knew precisely where the radio set was hidden, meaning the person who provided the tip had to be one of the few people who knew the radio was in Varga-Karady's piano. The leading supects as to who provided the tip are Hátszeghy and Fritz Laufer, a double agent in the OSS network in Eastern Europe.

As a secretary in the Ministry of Defense, he worked as a close aide to the Defense Minister Lajos Csatay and helped made preparations for the armistice delegation that went to Moscow in October 1944 to sign an armistice with the Soviet Union. After Operation Panzerfaust on 15 October 1944, Hátszeghy initially served the Arrow Cross regime and worked as the Chief of Staff of the VII Corps commanded by General János Markóczy. The VII Corps, which holding a line between Dunaföldvár and Paks had lost most of its strength by early November 1944, which led for Markóczy and Hátszeghy to open secret talks with the Red Army for surrender before the entire corps was destroyed. Hátszeghy used a captured Red Army office as his intermediary for the surrender talks, who crossed both and forth between the lines. On 6 November 1944, the Soviet officer while on the Hungarian side was arrested by German forces and taken away. Fearing that the officer under torture might reveal that he had been in the surrender talks, Hátszeghy decided to defect over to the Soviet lines the next day before he was arrested.

On 7 November 1944, he escaped and defected to the Soviet lines. Hátszeghy was sentenced to death in absentia by the Arrow Cross regime in December 1944 on charges of desertion and treason. Unable to arrest Hátszeghy, the Arrow Cross arrested Hátszeghy's mother and wife and handed both over to the Gestapo. Hátszeghy's wife and mother both died at the Ravensbrück concentration camp for women. Hátszeghy was a member of the Provisional National Assembly based in Debrecen that served as the provisional government of Hungary in the Soviet zone in opposition to the Arrow Cross government in the German zone. The provisional government, which was a coalition of several left-wing, centrist and right-wing parties was founded in Debrecen on 21 December 1944. Hátszeghy also served as an adviser to Marshal Rodion Malinovsky on Hungarian affairs. He was schuleded to take command of the 1st Hungarian Division loyal ot the provisional government that had raised from Hungarian POWs captured by the Red Army. On 5 April 1945, he was arrested by the NKVD (Narodnyy komissariat vnutrennikh del-People's Commissariat of Internal Affairs), the Soviet secret police and was imprisoned in the Soviet Union until 1955.

== Prisoner and Informer ==
For the first three years after his arrest, he was held in Moscow where he was interrogated about his wartime ties to the Abwehr and the OSS. The NKVD was convinced that Hátszeghy was a spy for both the Abwehr and the OSS, and seemed largely interested him for Cold War propagandistic reasons, namely that they wanted him to say the Americans were secretly working with the Germans against the Soviet Union during the war. A recurring theme of Soviet propaganda throughout the entire Cold War was the claim that the Soviet Union was the only one of the "Big Three" Allied powers actually committed to the destruction of Nazi Germany with the Americans and the British being presented in the Soviet media as only pretending to be against Germany and secretly working with Nazis. Hátszeghy told the NKVD that the OSS were willing to accept the borders of greater Hungary established between 1938-1941 in exchange for Hungary switching sides in the war and joining the Allies. He also told the NKVD that the OSS wanted the Hungarians to start sabotage operations and to pull the Hungarian Expeditionary Force out of the Soviet Union. Hátszeghy was thereafter was sent to a Gulag camp in Siberia. In 1952, he was convicted of anti-Soviet activity, but was acquitted in 1955 as part of "the thaw" in the Soviet Union after Stalin's death. On 8 May 1955, he was acquitted by a Soviet judge and in September 1955 was permitted to leave the Soviet Union.

In 1955, he returned to Hungary. Upon his return to Hungary, he worked as an informer for the AVH (Államvédelmi Hatóság-State Protection Authority) secret police. Hátszeghy married Róza Móznik in 1956 and he had a villa on Lake Balaton. During the 1956 revolution, Hátszeghy did not attempt to flee Hungary to Austria and instead went to his villa, where he offered sanctuary to AVH agents. During the revolution, a number of AVH officers were lynched, and Hátszeghy saved a number of lives of AVH officers. Hátszeghy retained close ties with a number of former Honved officers such his former boss Kádár while also informing on them. In turn, his friends who were also Ministry of Internal Affairs III agents informed on him. In the early 1960s, Hátszeghy frequently complained about his treatment, saying he was still treated as a second class citizen as a former Honved officer and that he had greater intelligence experience than many Internal Affairs officers. He served as the fencing master for the Bp Elektromos team from 1956 to 1959 and for the Dynamo Eisenach from 1963 to 1965. From 1963 to 1966, he lived in East Germany where he served as a coach for the East German fencing team while also working as an informer for the Stasi. Despite his complaints, Hátszegh lived in comfort in his last years as he was well rewarded for his work for the Internal Affairs ministers. He died in Budapest in 1977.

== Books ==
- Aronson, Shlomo (2004). Hitler, the Allies, and the Jews. Cambridge: Cambridge University Press. ISBN 9780521838771.
- Bauer, Yehuda (1994). Jews for Sale? Nazi-Jewish Negotiations, 1933-1945. New Haven: Yale University Press. ISBN 9780300068528.
- Borhi, László (Spring 2012). "Secret Peace Overtures, the Holocaust, and Allied Strategy vis-à-vis Germany: Hungary in the Vortex of World War II". Journal of Cold War Studies. 14 (2): 29–67.
- Cornelius, Deborah S (2011). Hungary in World War II: Caught in the Cauldron. New York: Fordham University Press. ISBN 978-0823233441.
- Tabajdi, Gábor; Ungváry, Krisztián (2008). Elhallgatott múlt: A pártállam és a belügy – A politikai rendőrség működése Magyarországon 1956–1990. Budapest: Corvina Kiadó. ISBN 978-963-13-5717-2.
