= German invasion of Hungary (1944) =

German occupation of Hungary during WWII

Operation Margarethe
- Part of World War II
- The four-pronged German invasion of Hungary
Date	19 March 1944
Location	Hungary
Result	Axis victory: Military occupation of Hungary

Belligerents
Germany	Hungary

Commanders and leaders
Adolf Hitler; Döme Sztójay	Miklós Horthy; Miklós Kállay

In March 1944, Hungary was occupied by the Wehrmacht. This invasion was formally known as Operation Margarethe (Unternehmen Margarethe).

== Course of events ==
=== The prelude ===
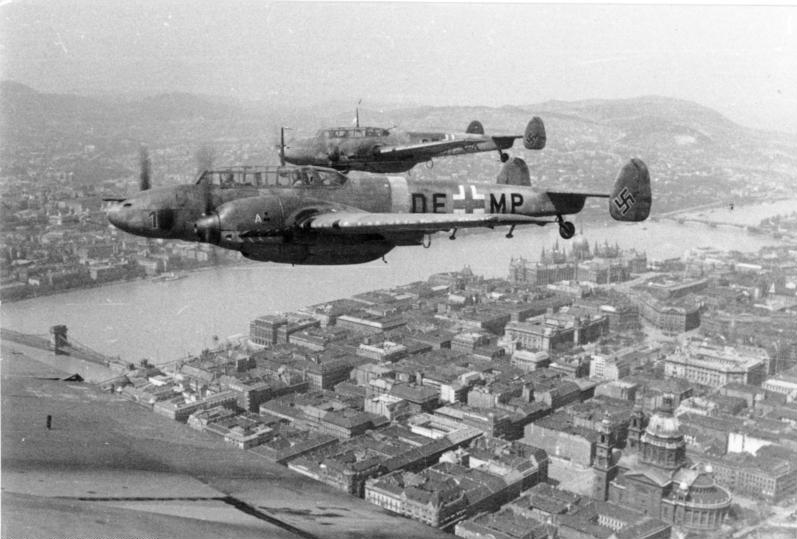
German Bf 110s flying over Budapest in January 1944.

Hungarian Prime Minister Miklós Kállay, who had been in office from 1942, had the knowledge and the approval of Hungarian Regent Miklós Horthy to secretly seek negotiations for a separate peace with the Allies in 1943. Kállay's Finance Minister, Lajos Reményi-Schneller, worked as a spy for Germany, going to the German Legation after every cabinet meeting to sell the minutes of the meeting. As a result, the German minister-plenipotentiary Dietrich von Jagow was always well informed of the decision-making in the Kállay government, and Jagow knew very well that Kállay was seeking to sign an armistice with the Allies. Moreover, Hungarian officials proved themselves to be far too gossipy and it was quite impossible to keep state secrets in Budapest. In February 1943, Kállay contacted the diplomat György Barcza to go on a peace mission to the Holy See in Rome with the aim of having Pope Pius XII serve as an intermediary for contacting the Allies about signing an armistice. Barcza complained that despite being a supposed secret that everyone in Budapest seemed to know about his peace mission, including his own barber whom casually asked him if he thought his mission in Rome would be a success. At the first conference at the Schloss Klessheim palace held between 17-18 April 1943, Adolf Hitler told Horthy and Kállay that he knew all about Barcza's peace mission in Rome and warned them that he would not tolerate such "treason" again in the future.

On 3 September 1943, Italy signed the Armistice of Cassibile with the Allies, which led Adolf Hitler to order the occupation of Italy along with the Italian occupation zones in the Balkans and France. On 9 September 1943, aboard a yacht in the Sea of Marmara, just outside of Istanbul, the British ambassador to Turkey, Sir Hughe Knatchbull-Hugessen secretly signed an armistice with the Hungarian diplomat László Veress under which Hungarian forces would surrender to British, American and Polish forces the moment they arrived in Hungary. After the Italian armistice, Hitler ordered the Oberkommando der Wehrmacht (OKW) to begin planning for Operation Margarethe I for the occupation of Hungary and Operation Margarethe II for the occupation of Romania. On 30 September 30, 1943, Field Marshal Wilhelm Keitel of the OKW reported to Hitler that both plans were complete and the Reich was ready if either Hungary and/or Romania signed an armistice as Italy had just done.

In September 1943, Colonel Ottó Hátszeghy, the Hungarian Military attaché to Bulgaria was in contact with agents of the Office of Strategic Services (OSS) in Turkey. The talks that Hátszeghy held in Turkey with the OSS were considered so important that he met both Ferenc Szombathelyi, the chief of the general staff, and Kállay, when he returned to Budapest on 8 October 1943. Hátszeghy brought with him a radio that the OSS had given him, and which Gyula Kádár, the director of the G-2 intelligence service hid in the piano of his mistress, the actress Katalina Varga-Karady. Beginning in November 1943, Elyesa Bazna, the Albanian valet to Knatchbull-Hugessen, obtained access to his ambassador's safe, photographed secret British diplomatic documents within, and sold them to the Germans. The Germans paid Bazna with counterfeit British pounds, which thereby ruined his dreams of getting rich from his treachery. One of the documents Bazna sold to the Germans was the secret armistice Knatchbull-Hugessen had signed with Veress, which was received with much interest in Berlin. Under the terms of the secret armistice, the Hungarians were to destroy their transport infrastructure and cut the Reich off from its oil supplies in Romania in the event of a German invasion of Hungary. On 14 December 1943, the officers responsible for the Újvidék massacre during the "Cold Days" of January 1942 went on trial in Budapest for war crimes. As most of the people killed during the "Cold Days" massacre were "undesirables" such as Jews and Serbs, the decision to try the officers responsible "enraged the Germans" and became a major sore point in German-Hungarian relations. Also on 14 December 1943, Hátszeghy met Adolf-Heinz Beckerle, the German minister plenipotentiary to Bulgaria, and gave him a full account of all dealings with the OSS since September. On 17 January 1944, General Ferenc Feketehalmy-Czeydner, Colonel László Deák and Major General József Grassy of the Honvéd along with Captain Márton Zöldy of the Royal Hungarian Gendarmerie were convicted of their roles in the Újvidék massacre and fled to Germany on 18 January 1944 to avoid their sentences. In February 1944, the talks that Hátszeghy was conducting in Turkey with the OSS led to a promise that the OSS would send in a three man team in Operation Sparrow, which was intended to be the start of a larger effort to send in OSS commando teams into Hungary.

By early 1944, the Red Army had advanced into the Ukraine and almost reached the foothills of the Carpathians. As Germany obtained most of its oil from Romania, Hitler was determined to defend his principal source of oil, which in turn made Hungary crucial to the German war effort as the Romanian oil had to cross Hungary to reach Germany. Owing to his concerns about maintaining access to oil, Hitler believed that Hungary would bolt from the Axis the moment the Red Army reached the Carpathians. Hitler wanted to prevent the Hungarians from deserting Germany. On 4 March 1944, the German Propaganda Minister, Dr. Josef Goebbels wrote in his diary: "Treason had to be punished, the Führer will invade the Kingdom of Hungary". Goebbels went to quote Hitler as saying to him: "There are 700 thousand Jews in Hungary, we will not let them slip through our fingers." On 7 March 1944, Hitler decided to activate Operation Margarthe I. As Romania under Marshal Ion Antonescu, Croatia under Ante Pavelić and Slovakia under Father Jozef Tiso all had territorial claims against Hungary, Hitler's first plan was to erase Hungary from the map by partitioning Hungary between Romania, Croatia and Slovakia. Wilhelm Höttl, a SS officer was opposed to the partition plan, believing that the Hungarians would fight to the death if faced with such a threat. As crossing Hungary was the fastest and easiest route for Romanian oil to reach the Reich, it was likely that the Hungarians would destroy their transport infrastructure such as railroads and bridges under the terms of the secret armistice, which would temporarily cut Germany off from the Romanian oil at a time when the Wehrmacht was being badly pressed by the Red Army on the Eastern Front. Höttl wrote up a memo calling for a political solution under which Germany would occupy Hungary, but keep Horthy as regent in order to prevent any sabotage of the Hungarian transport infrastructure and ensure the co-operation of Hungarian officials. Horthy was the subject of an immense personality cult from 1919 onwards with the entire apparatus of the Hungarian state seeking to glorify him. Horthy's personality cult portrayed him as a God-like figure on a mission to undo the Treaty of Trianon and restore all of the Lands of the Crown of St. Istvan. Most Hungarians accepted Horthy's self-image at face value and as such any government in Budapest appointed by Horthy would be accepted by both Hungarian civil servants and the Hungarian people as legitimate. Given the power of the Horthy personality cult, Höttl tactfully argued that his political solution was the best solution to Hungarian attempts to leave the war as he sought to persuade Hitler away from his preferred military solution. Höttl had to struggle to get the memo placed on Hitler's desk in the Reich Chancellery, forcing him to bribe an aide-de-camp to leave the memo on Hitler's desk. After reading Höttl's memo, Hitler decided to try the political solution first and if Horthy refused to co-operate, would opt for his initial military solution. Hitler had decided to co-opt the Horthy personality cult to his own ends as he believed that if Horthy could persuaded to accept the occupation of his kingdom, there would be no resistance and he would have the full co-operation of the Hungarian state. On 12 March 1944, German troops received orders by Hitler to capture critical Hungarian facilities. As part of the preparations for Margarethe I, the Reichsführer-SS Heinrich Himmler gave orders to SS-Obersturmbannführer Adolf Eichmann to go to Hungary to "sweep out the Jews from the country in the direction from east to west, and deport every Jew to Auschwitz as quickly as possible. To start in the eastern counties which the Russians are approaching and to take care that no event similar to the Warsaw Ghetto uprising takes place".

The American historian Deborah Cornelius wrote that in March 1944 was "the carnival season. Life in Hungary went on as if there was no cloud in the sky". György Barcza, the former Hungarian minister-plenipotentiary to Great Britain recalled in his memoirs that March 1944 that "never was the season so filled withi dinners, déjeuners, teas and cocktail parties...Jews occupied the best tables in the restaurants and the best seats in the theaters". Rafi Benshalom, a Slovak Jewish leader who fled to Hungary in January 1944 stated that compared to Slovakia Hungary was a far more friendly place for a Jew to be in: "For me, in Europe of 1944, this seemed like a fantasy...Jews seeking entertainment could still visit coffee houses, cinemas and theaters while the whole world lived in fear." The Hungarian historian Laszlo Borhi noted that the three Jewish laws passed between 1938-1941 had caused serious economic hardship for Hungarian Jews while the third anti-Jewish law of 1941 had banned marriage and sex between Hungarian Gentiles and Jews, but that compared to other places in Axis Europe, Hungary under the Kállay government was a relatively benign place. Most notably, under Kállay, Hungarian Jews did not have to wear armbands with the yellow star of David, which was mandatory in Nazi Germany and in all of the nations occupied by Germany such as Poland and France. To escape genocide, Polish, Slovak and Croat Jews often fled to Hungary. The armband with the yellow star of David was considered by most Jews to be a humiliating symbol that marked them out as a people apart, and those Jews who fled into Hungary were often amazed that the requirement to wear the armband did not exist in Hungary. Most Hungarians believed that the Allied armies advancing slowly up Italy would reach Hungary before the Red Army did and that the war would soon be over. Kállay had relaxed the level of police repression, and the opposition parties, namely the Social Democrats on the left and the Smallholders on the right, held large rallies, promising universal suffrage and land reform after the war. Kállay was supposed to give a speech on 20 March 1944 to mark the 50th anniversary of the death of Lajos Kossuth in 1894 and popular rumor had it he would be announcing an armistice along with the arrival of Anglo-American airborne divisions. On 15 March 1944, Operation Sparrow started with a three-man OSS team parachuting into Hungary.

=== The Schloss Klessheim meeting ===
Hitler invited Horthy to the Palace of Klessheim, near Salzburg. On the evening of 15 March 1944, when Admiral Horthy was watching a performance of the opera Petofi, he received an urgent message from the German minister-plenipotentiary (ambassador) Dietrich von Jagow, which stated that he had to see Horthy immediately at the German Legation. When Horthy arrived, von Jagow gave him a letter from Hitler inviting him to a face-to-face meeting at Schloss Klessheim in Austria on 18 March to discuss Horthy's demand that all of the Hungarian forces in the Soviet Union be pulled out to defend Hungary. Hitler in his letter stated that he wanted Horthy along with the Foreign Minister Jenő Ghyczy, the Defense Minister Lajos Csatay and the chief of the general staff, General Ferenc Szombathelyi to attend the Schloss Klessheim meeting, but that he was absolutely opposed to having Miklós Kállay or the Interior Minister Ferenc Keresztes-Fischer present, saying that both Kállay and Keresztes-Fischer should stay in Budapest. On 16 March 1944, Horthy met with Kállay who advised him not to go to Schloss Klessheim, saying that as "Supreme Warlord" the Honved (Royal Hungarian Army) would be leaderless in his absence and he suspected a trap. Kállay told Horthy he should send Szombathelyi instead. Szombathelyi agreed to go, but insisted that Horthy come along as well as he felt it would be "madness" for Hitler to spring a trap. On 17 March 1944, Horthy along with Szombathelyi, the Defense Minister Lajos Csatay and the Foreign Minister Jenő Ghyczy left for Schloss Klessheim via train and arrived early on the morning of 18 March.

As Horthy was fluent in German, he did not need a translator as he met Hitler and the German Foreign Minister Joachim von Ribbentrop at the Schloss Klessheim. As both heads of state conducted their negotiations at Schloss Klessheim, German forces not already stationed in Hungary quietly marched from Reichsgaue of the Ostmark into Hungary. The meeting served merely as a ruse to keep Horthy out of the country and to leave the Hungarian Army without orders. Hitler stated he ordered the occupation in Italy in September 1943 because the Italians had signed an armistice with the Allies and because he knew the Hungarians had also signed an armistice, he just ordered an occupation of Hungary. The tenor of the meeting was distinctly unfriendly as Hitler was very angry about the secret armistice, which stated was a crass act of ingratitude to the Reich. Between November 1938-April 1941, Hungary had taken some of the lands lost under the Treaty of Trianon due to German patronage, and Hitler told Horthy he could just as easily take away from the Hungarians what he had given them. Hitler blamed the secret armistice on Kállay and stated if Horthy was wiling to co-operate, he would be allowed to continue on as Regent and Hungary to keep its territorial integrity. If his offer was rejected, Hitler stated that Hungary would cease to exist as he would have Hungary divided three ways between the Slovaks, the Romanians and the Croats. Horthy later told the British historian C.A. Macartney: "If I had my revolver with me, I would have shot the scoundrel; all my life I'll regret that I didn't do it". The meeting took a bizarre turn when a flustered and red-faced Horthy fled from the conference hall with Hitler and Ribbentrop chasing after him, telling him to sign the protocol or else Hungary would be destroyed. When Horthy was cornered, he retreated to his bedroom and refused to come out until lunch. At the second Hitler-Horthy meeting later in the afternoon, Horthy tried to talk out Hitler out of occupying his country by claiming that the Hungarians were the only people left in the world who still loved the Germany, saying that "even Hottentots and Laplanders" hated the Germans and warned that if Germany occupied Hungary then the Reich would no more friends in the world. Hitler replied that the Germans were the herrenvolk (master race) and did not need friends in the world. Horthy then told Hitler he would give him as word as a Hungarian officer and gentleman he would commit suicide if Hungary surrendered to the Allies in exchange for Hungary not being occupied. In response, Hitler asked "what good would that do me?" The meeting ended late in the afternoon with Horthy attempting to leave, but being blocked by Ribbentrop who lied by telling him the Allies were staging an air raid on Salzburg and he would have to wait. When Horthy still insisted on leaving, Ribbentrop ordered the SS guards to release smoke canisters, which Ribbentrop claimed was from an American bombing raid.

The negotiations between Horthy and Hitler lasted until 18 March, when Horthy boarded a train to return home. Szombathelyi played the crucial role in convincing Horthy to sign the protocol. At about 8pm, Ribbentrop told Horthy that Hitler wanted to see him again. Hitler softened the blow by promising the occupation would be over as soon as he had confidence in the new Hungarian government, saying "the German troops shall be withdrawn as soon as a new Hungarian government that has my confidence has been formed". Hitler also made concessions such as promising no Romanian, Slovak or Croat soldiers would take part in the occupation; that the German occupation would be smaller than he had first wanted; and that the Honved would be confined to their barracks and would not disarmed as he had first demanded. With Hitler's promise that he would end the occupation soon, Horthy signed the protocol and boarded his tain back to Budapest. Hitler and Ribbentrop were sufficiently well pleased with the agreement just signed to see off Horthy and his entourage off as they boarded the train. On 19 March, the military occupation of Hungary began. The Germans kept side-tracking Horthy's train, delaying his return to Hungary while Kállay had no idea of the agreement that Horthy had just signed.

=== The Invasion ===
Kállay had went to bed and he later remembered: "I was hardly in me bed when my direct phone with the ministry of the interior rang. Kerzesztes-Fischer told me only to get dressed and that he would be with me very quickly because serious events were under way. A few minutes later he arrived to tell me that the frontier guards had reported that the Germans had crossed the border in trains, tanks and armored cars, the various units evidently heading towards Budapest...Accordingly to the general staff the following forces had been concentrated against us: on the western frontier, five German divisions; in the north and around Kassa one German and one Slovak divisions; along the southeastern frontier ten Romanian divisions; in the Belgrade area, four to five German divisions; westward of this, important Croatian forces had been deposed against us. The only forces that we had ready for action were those in the Carpathians". Kállay called an emergency meeting with the three Honved generals in Budapest, who each commanded a corps, who were János Vörös, Károly Beregfy and István Náday to ask for their advice As the meeting was in progress, a telegram from Szombathelyi arrived, saying that there was to be no resistance until Horthy returned to Budapest. Shortly afterwards, the German military attache, General Greiffenberg, showed up at the prime minister's office with a letter from Keitel. Keitel's letter was the first inking Kállay had of the Schloss Klessheim agreement. The letter warned that any Hungarian resistance would be "ruthlessly" crushed. Vörös, Beregfy and Náday all advised Kállay that resistance was futile. Kállay was notably angered with the approach of the generals and advocated resistance, saying that history would judge the Hungarians harshly if they just accepted an occupation with no resistance. Both Vörös and Beregfy openly refused to obey any orders to resist, Náday was willing to obey Kállay's orders to resist, but warned that an order to oppose the invasion risked causing a civil war as much of the Hovned officer corps were fascist radicals. The most Kállay was able to achieve from the generals was a promise that the Honved would resist if attacked and that the Honved would be put on the highest state of alert. Kállay spent the next three hours burning secret documents from the prime minister's office in the fireplace. Kállay's son, Christopher, meanwhile phoned up MPs, Jewish leaders and Anglophile aristocrats warning them that Hungary was being occupied. Szombathelyi then issued orders from the royal train saying there was to be no resistance.

At the Ludovica Military Academy (the Hungarian equivalent to Sandhurst, West Point and St. Cyr), the cadets had a cross-country race planned for Sunday morning followed by leave in the afternoon. After midnight, they were woken up to be informed that Hungary had just been invaded. One of the cadets, Tibor Petrusz, recalled: "I have to have say we honestly we didn't know how we should react, what we should feel. The Germans were our military comrades, we were allies. But this, that they should occupy Hungary, offended our national pride. At the Ludovkia we got the order to 'hold together', but we didn't understand what the command meant. That we should stand against the Germans?-or perhaps that we were to carry something out with the Germans? They handed out ammunition, so that if there should be a skirmish with the Germans, they could bring in the Ludovkia classes trained to carry out policing actions". In the town of Ungvár (modern Uzhhorod, Ukraine), one Jewish woman remembered: "Right after the German invasion they took hostages and released them only after a payment of one million pengős in ransom money had been paid. The Germans promised that nothing would happen, but of course they lied...They took all the gold, silver, valuables. They occupied the most beautifully furnished houses and took us to the ghetto. When the Germans came, we spent many nights away from home, we were too scared to stay at home, the Germans broke our windows." Another woman, the anti-Semitic Mrs. Győző Burták welcomed the invasion, writing in a letter: "Yes, it was the 12th hour, but with the help of our German friends the country awoke from its lethargy and the cleansing began on the 20-year-old rubbish dump [of the Horthy regime]. It is a great shame that we needed foreign doctors for the remedy, but we needed it for the awakening". László Nagy, the village notary in Kóka wrote at the time: all true Hungarians are delighted that the Jews will get their deserved punishment for all their past sins."

When Horthy arrived in Budapest, Wehrmacht soldiers were waiting for him at the station. Greeting Horthy at the Kelenfōld train station at 11 am were a honor guard of Wehrmacht and SS soldiers along with a delegation that consisted of SA-Obergruppenführer Dietrich von Jagow, Field Marshal Maximilian von Weichs and SS-SS-Brigadeführer Edmund Veesenmayer. Horthy was told by von Jagow that Hungary would remain sovereign only if he removed Kállay and replaced him with a government that would co-operate fully with Germany. Otherwise, Hungary would be subject to an undisguised occupation. Kállay who had also arrived at the station was shocked to see that the usual Hungarian honor guard was not present and "at every door an armed SS soldier appeared instead of the usual Hungarian bodyguard". Upon greeting Horthy, he reported that the regent "was deathly pale and looked worn out, but he was still the master of himself".

At a meeting of the Crown Council, Kállay and the Interior Minister Ferenc Keresztes-Fischer gave their opinions that Hungary was no longer independent and any actions taken from this point onwards would be illegal. Keresztes-Fischer added that the SS had arrested 45 well known Hungarians including several MPs. Horthy justified signing the protocol, saying that otherwise Hungary would had been partitioned between Slovakia, Croatia and Romania. At the meeting, Horthy was greatly incensed that his daughter-in-law, Ilona Horthy, who had gone to dedicate a monument to her late husband, István Horthy, was being prevented from returning to Budapest as she was held up at a German roadblock in the countryside. Kállay advised Horthy to abdicate rather go on with the occupation, saying he was legitimizing the German presence by staying on as Regent. Kállay stated he wanted Horthy to abdicate, saying "it was the only way we could refute the story which the Germans were spreading that he had consented to the military occupation". The former prime minister István Bethlen also visited the Royal Castle to tell Horthy to abdicate and not to appoint a new prime minister, again under the grounds he was lending his prestige to the occupation by staying on. Bethlen told Horthy: "If there is no government the Germans will have no one with which to negotiate with. Public opinion at home and abroad will see that there has been an end to legitimate government". A group of Jewish leaders led by Ferenc Chorin and Móric Kornfeld arrived at the Royal Castle to ask Horthy to stay on as Regent, arguing that if abdicated, someone worse would be appointed as the new head of state. Horthy chose to go on, saying that "the captain cannot leave his sinking ship". Kállay then advised Horthy to go into seclusion as King Christian X of Denmark had done in 1940 to show his disapproval of his kingdom being occupied by Germany, but Horthy refused, saying he had duty to his people and could go into seclusion as King Christian had done. At some point in the late 1930s, Horthy had started to believe in his own personality cult as he started to take much about his "God-given mission", his "selectedness" and his "extraordinary" qualities. The fact that Hungary had regained some of the lands lost under the Treaty of Trianon between 1938-1941 was taken by Horthy as evidence of his own greatness as he started to refer himself as the "enlarger of Hungary" and as his biographer Thomas Sakmyster noted "he could not show any restraint in the pursuit of additional territorial revision." Horthy never lost the hope that he could take back all of the lands lost under the Treaty of Trianon, which was one of the main reasons why he chose to stay on as Regent. Furthermore, Horthy had come to believe that Hungary could not function without him, and as such it was his duty to stay on as regent because otherwise all would be lost. The Germans had wanted Béla Imrédy as prime minister, whom Horthy rejected.

When Horthy continued to reject Imrédy, he received an ultimatum, saying to form a new government acceptable to the Reich by 6 pm March 22 1944 or else the Royal Castle would be stormed. At 3:45 pm on 22 March, Horthy agreed to form a new government headed by Döme Sztójay with several ministers from Imrédy's Party of Hungarian Renewal. From the right-wing of the Party of Hungarian Life were Béla Jurcsek as Agriculture Minister, Lajos Reményi-Schneller as Finance Minister and Lajos Szász as Industry Minister, but Imrédy himself was excluded. Besides for prime ministership, the most important cabinet change was the dismissal of Keresztes-Fischer as Interior Minister. The new Interior Minister was the radical antisemite Andor Jaross from the Imrédy's Party of Hungarian Renewal. The ruling Party of Hungarian Life (better known by its original name as the Unity Party) remained the ruling party with its conservative wing associated purged while the Party of Hungarian Renewal (which had been founded by Imrédy as a splinter party from the Party of Hungarian Life in October 1940) was given several important portfolios in the cabinet. The Israeli historian Asher Cohen wrote that Jaross was "an extreme antisemite and pro-Nazi". Jaross's two principal undersecretaries at the Interior Ministry, László Endre and László Baky, were both enthusiastic members of the National Socialist Party of Hungary. As the Interior Ministry controlled both the State Police and the Royal Hungarian Gendarmerie, Jaross was in a strong position to carry out his plans to work with the Germans to exterminate the Jews of Hungary. The only concession to Horthy was that Lajos Csatay was allowed to stay on as Defense Minister. On 23 March 1944 Horthy swore in the pro-Nazi General Döme Sztójay as prime minister to appease German concerns. The Arrow Cross Party led by Ferenc Szálasi was excluded from the government as the Germans wanted a "respectable" image to Sztójay's government.

=== The occupation begins ===
Being a complete surprise, the occupation was quick and bloodless. Generally, there was little resistance, but there were several border incidents as the frontier guards fired on the invaders and at Bicske the railroad workers went on strike rather than assist with the invasion. There was so little resistance that most Hungarians failed to notice that their country had just been occupied. The only indication was that Kállay's speech for the Kossuth anniversary celebration was suddenly cancelled with no explanation given along with the cancellation of all the Kossuth celebrations planned for 20 March. A clue to the occupation was the subtle change in the news sources on the radio. Previously, Hungarian radio had paraphrased the news from the BBC's Magyar language radio broadcasts, but starting on 19 March started paraphrasing the news from Radio Berlin. When Parliament met on 22 March 1944, 13 members of the Lower House and 9 members of the Upper House were not present on the account of being arrested by the SS. One MP, József Kózi-Horváth, in a speech complained that it was outrageous that Hungarian MPs had been arrested on Hungarian soil by a foreign power, but he was cut off when the speaker of the house ruled he was out of order and he was ejected from Parliament. Sztójay announced that Parliament was to be adjourned indefinitely and he ruled by a degree.

Hungarian newspapers made no mention of the occupation for the first three days and then only causally mentioned in passing that German troops had arrived in Hungary supposedly only to assist with the defense against the advancing Red Army. The notice that appeared in the Hungarian newspapers read: "In order to assist Hungary in the common war...against the common enemy and in particular in effectively combatting Bolshevism...German troops have arrived in Hungary as the result of a mutual agreement...The two allied governments have agreed that the measures which have been taken will contribute towards Hungary throwing into the scale every resource calculated to help on the final victory of the common cause, in the spirt of the old friendship and comradreship in arms between the Hungarian and German peoples". In the Kingdom of Hungary, anti-Communism and antisemitism were rampant as most Hungarians believed that the Hungarian Soviet Republic of 1919 was the work of the Jews. Throughout the entire Horthy era, the message had been relentlessly promoted by the government that the Hungarian Jewish community bore a collective guilt for the Soviet Republic of 1919. To the extent that it was noticed, most Hungarians felt it was far better to be occupied by Nazi Germany than by the Soviet Union and the claim that Germany had occupied Hungary to protect it from the Soviets was widely believed. Judit Stůr, an young woman who was the daughter of an upper middle class civil servant in Kőszeg, recalled that the German soldiers occupying her town were attractive and charming young men, and she did not feel oppressed by their presence. Soon, she taken one of the German soldiers as her boyfriend. Stůr stated her father was anti-Semitic as he believed that Hungarian Jews were too intelligent for Gentiles to compete with economically and he felt that increased antisemitism of the Sztójay government was justified, through she added that her best friend at high school was Jewish and her mother's favorite hairdresser was a Jewish woman.

Field Marshal Maximilian von Weichs, who had in charge of executing Operation Margarethe I reported to Berlin: "Morning: the occupation is going according to plan. Only one place where Hungarian troop disarmament took place. And only because my command did not arrive in time. But we took care of it. In Budapest everything is quiet. Nowhere any opposition...Evening we achieved all of our goals. Parts of the army received us ceremonially. In other places some resistance-but only by mistake...In Budapest there is quiet". Likewise, SS-Brigadeführer Edmund Veesenmayer-who replaced von Jagow as the German minister-plenipotentiary shortly after the occupation-reported to Berlin: "The situation is quiet. The Hungarian troops accept us loyally. The population is in general neutral". The traditional rivarly between the SA and the SS still ran strong, and the SS in Hungary refused to take orders from SA-Obergruppenführer Jagow. Veesenmayer who had previously served in Yugoslavia stated he much preferred Hungary as there was fierce guerrilla resistance in Yugoslavia and he was always afraid of assassination while in Hungary he never felt his life was in danger. Veesenmayer stated that one year in Hungary was more safer than one day in Yugoslavia. The most important official in the rural areas of Hungary was the Lord Lieutenants who were in charge of the counties. The most important administrative units in the rural part was the county. By April 1944, Veesenmayer had replaced 29 out of the 41 Lord Lieutenants, replacing those Lord Lieutenants unlikely to co-operate with the deportation of the Jews. Veesenmayer also sacked the Lord Mayor of Budapest along with two-thirds of the other Lord Mayors of Hungarian cities and towns. Sztójay banned all opposition parties, unions, and trade associations while also imposed a strict censorship on the newspapers and the radio. Szombathelyi was dismissed as chief of the general staff and replaced with Vörös, who had endeared himself to the Germans by telling Kállay he would disobey an order to resist the invasion. Náday, the only general who had been willing to obey Kállay's orders to resist, was dishonorably discharged. Three officers of the general staff whom the Germans disliked, namely Major General István Újszászy, Colonel Gyula Kádár and Major Károly Kern were arrested. Kádár was arrested after the Gestapo found the OSS radio that Ottó Hátszeghy had brought to Budapest in October 1943 hidden in the piano of Kádár's mistress Katalina Varga-Karady. Just who told the Gestapo that there was an OSS radio set hidden in the piano of the famous actress Varga-Karady was never established, but it was almost certainly either Hátszeghy or Friz Laufer, a double agent who betrayed a number of OSS missions in 1943-1944.

One of the few Hungarians who chose to resist was Endre Bajcsy-Zsilinszky, the leader of the right-wing Smallholders Party, which represented the interests of the peasants, most of whom were disfranchised. When the SS kicked in the door of his apartment in Budapest, Bajcsy-Zsilinszky pulled out his pistol and engaged in a shoot-out with the SS that ended with Bajcsy-Zsilinszky taking two bullets in his chest and his arrest. More typical was the arrest of the liberal politician Károly Rassay who was arrested outside of his Budapest home by two German soldiers and an Arrow Cross member with no resistance. Bethen disguised himself as a Honved colonel and fled to the estate of a friend high up in the Carpathian mountains of Transylvania. Kállay fled to the Turkish legation where the Turkish minister-plenipotentiary Sevket Fuat Kececi granted him sanctuary. Károly Peyer, the leader of the left-wing Social Democrats, fled Budapest but returned to surrender to the Germans after they took his family hostage and threatened to execute all of them if he did not turn himself in. Keresztes-Fischer was arrested by the Gestapo and sent to the Dachau concentration camp. By 28 April 1944, the Germans had arrested 8, 240 people in Hungary. Many of those arrested were Allied POWs who had escaped from POW camps in Germany and been granted sanctuary in Hungary by the Kállay government along with the Polish soldiers who had fled to Hungary in September 1939. The escaped POWs and Allied soldiers taken into German custody were 5, 450 Polish servicemen (the majority of whom had escaped to Hungary in 1939), 812 French POWs, 180 Soviet POWs, 39 British POWs, 11 American POWs, 16 Belgian POWs and 12 Dutch POWs. After the German occupation in March, all of the officers convicted of the Újvidék massacre who fled to Germany, namely Feketehalmy-Czeydner, Deák, Grassy, and Zöldy all returned to Hungary to resume their careers as if nothing had happened and were furthermore promoted to reward them as compensation for their suffering for being convicted of war crimes. One of the first acts of the Sztójay government in early April 1944 was to require all Hungarian Jews along with all foreign Jews living in Hungary to wear the armband with the yellow star of David.

The initial German plan was to immobilise the Hungarian Army, but with Soviet forces advancing from the north and the east and the prospect of British and American forces invading the Balkans, the Oberkommando der Wehrmacht decided to retain Hungarian forces in the field and so sent troops to defend the passes through the Carpathian Mountains from a possible invasion. After the occupation, Horthy became depressed and withdrawn, rarely leaving the Royal Castle and only maintaining social contact with his immediate family. The only minister Horthy saw on a regular basis was the Defense Minister Csatay and the rest of the Sztójay cabninet he avoided.

Following the German military occupation, Adolf Eichmann was instructed to arrange the transportation of 550,000 Hungarian Jews from wartime Hungary (including Jews from territories that had been annexed from Czechoslovakia (Sub-Carpathian Ruthenia), Romania and Yugoslavia) to extermination camps with Hungarian authorities' collaboration. The Eichmann Kommando sent to Hungary numbered only 200 men and the vast majority of the work of deporting the Jews of Hungary was done by Hungarian officials. One of Eichmann's first acts on 20 March was to summon the Jewish elite to form a "Jewish Council" to administer the affairs of the Jewish community and to start preparing the community to be deported. Eichmann appointed a wealthy businessmen Samu Stern as the chairman of the Council with instructions to prepare the Jews for "resettlement in the East". The Hungarian Jewish community was badly divided into two factions, the Orthodox and the Neolog, and the leaders of both factions were represented on the Jewish Council. The leaders of the Jewish Council were all wealthy men, conservative in their views and who viewed themselves as good Hungarian patriots. The leaders of the Jewish Council knew from talking to refugees from Poland and Slovakia that there was no utopian Jewish homeland said to be located somewhere in the German occupied Soviet Union and that "resettlement in the East" meant extermination. Despite this knowledge, the Jewish Council did their best to deny the rumors of genocide circulating in the Jewish community and to insist the Jewish homeland that the Nazis were said to have created really did exist. The men of the Jewish Council put their own survival and the survival of their families ahead of the survival of other Jews, and clung to the belief by showing their "patriotism" by ensuring the extermination of other Jews would ensure their own survival as they believed Horthy would step in to save them. On 16 May 1944, the first train of Hungarian Jews left for Auschwitz as the new Sztójay government was willing to play its part in the "Final Solution of the Jewish Question". By 8 July 1944 when Horthy ordered a halt to the deportations, about 437, 000 Hungarian Jews had been exterminated at Auschwitz. A disproportionate number of the middle class people in Hungary were Jewish. As a result, the "Final Solution" in Hungary set off a massive bout of greed as many people saw genocide as a chance to become rich by seizing the assets of Hungary's Jewish middle class for themselves. Whatever a Jewish family was deported to Auschwitz, their homes were immediately looted by their neighbors. In the village of Belvárosi Kávéház, the writer Simon Kemény recalled he kept hearing a large crowd outside his saying: "'Jew'. Jewish estate, Jewish horse, Jewish bull, Jew, Jew, je, je, the air was literally echoing with the many je sounds. These gentlemen all had a stake in one way or another in the great redistribution, and if things had gotten this far, they wanted a part in the booty which the age and the law was going to give them."

Because of the secret armistice Kállay's government had signed in September 1943, Hungary had been spared from the Anglo-American strategic bombing offensive. With the new Sztójay government, Hungary was subject to the full fury of the strategic bombing offensive. On 2 April 1944, Budapest was hit by a heavy daytime American bombing raid, followed by an equally heavy British nighttime bombing raid on 3 April 1944. From that time onwards, Budapest and other were bombed on a regular basis by Anglo-American aircraft, whose raids caused much damage while killing hundreds of people per raid.

The invasion and occupation of Hungary was part of a broader effort by Hitler to stem the Soviet advance on the Eastern Front. Other steps included designating certain cities as "fortresses" which were to be heavily fortified and to held to the death by those defending them as a way to slow down the Soviet advance. Later on in 1944, Budapest was to be designate a "fortress city", which led to notably fierce battle that in late 1944-early 1945 that saw Budapest largely destroyed. Another step was in sacking the two defeated Army Group commanders who had recently lost much ground in the Ukraine, namely Erich von Manstein and Ewald von Kleist. Manstein and Kleist were replaced as commanders of Army Group South and Army Group A with more Nazi officers, Walter Model and Ferdinand Schörner. Of all Hitler's measures to shore up the Eastern Front, the occupation of Hungary was the most successful as he replaced Kállay with Sztójay; ended Hungary's efforts for the moment to leave the war and ensure that the Romanian oil continued to reach the Reich with no sabotage ; and brought the "Final Solution to the Jewish Question" to Hungary, achieving all of his aims.

Horthy's decision to stay on as Regent after the occupation is one of the most controversial decisions of his career and still debated by historians today. Horthy's defenders argued that by staying on as Regent he able to order a halt to the deportations of Hungarian Jews to Auschwitz-Birkenau death camp on 8 July 1944, dismiss Sztójay as prime minister on 29 August 1944 in order to replace him with General Géza Lakatos, and signed an armistice with the Allies on 10 October 1944, all of which would not had happened had he abdicated in March 1944. Horthy's defenders further argue that he had rejected the Schloss Klessheim agreement, Germany would had still invaded and Hungary would had been partitioned between Romania, Croatia and Slovakia as Hitler had originally planned. Horthy's critics argue that by staying on as Regent he legitimised the occupation and the Sztójay government, and the vast majority of Hungarian civil servants along with the Hungarian people saw the new regime as legitimate. Horthy was popular with the Hungarian people, and much of the lack of resistance to the occupation was due to the belief that the regent approved of the Sztójay government. The orders from Sztójay and Jaross for Hungarian civil servants to work with Eichmann in deporting the Jews of Hungary to Auschwitz-Birkenau were widely obeyed, which might not have been the situation if Horthy had abdicated. Cohen noted that there was a contradiction in Horthy's post-war memoirs when he claimed he stayed on as Regent to protect his Jewish subjects from being exterminated vs. his claim that he had no idea of the Holocaust in March 1944, which he claims to have first learned about only in early July 1944. Cohen further noted that was "not clear is the how and why of his assurance that his remaining in office might prevent the disaster. Even less does he explain why, in spite of everything done, he deliberately ignored the problem throughout the critical months of April-June [1944]. Cohen further noted that in the summer of 1941 the prime minister László Bárdossy had all of the Jews from Galicia living in Hungary expelled as illegal immigrants who were all exterminated in the Kamianets-Podilskyi massacre of August 1941, a massacre that everyone in the Hungarian elite were well aware of. Finally, Cohen noted that despite what Horthy claimed in his memoirs there is evidence that Horthy knew about the Holocaust at least in general as early as 1942. The Hungarian historian Dávid Turbucz was very critical of Horthy's decision to stay on as regent, writing: "By maintaining his own position and legitimizing political changes, Horthy contributed significantly to the effective regime of occupation, to the military and economic mobilization of Hungary in support of the Reich, and finally to the crimes against humanity and the deportation of a large part of Hungarian Jewry". Furthermore, Horthy's decision to go along with a disguised occupation and his public statements that Hungary was not occupied cost Hungary any sympathy with the Allies, who decided to restore the frontiers created by the Treaty of Trianon after the war.

== Aftermath ==
Despite the occupation, Horthy regardless attempted to negotiate a peace treaty and surrender with the Soviet Union. By October 1944 the Soviet Budapest offensive was nearly ready to launch and Horthy made a radio broadcast that an armistice had been agreed. The Germans were ready, however. Horthy was overthrown in Operation Panzerfaust, a coup that placed the Nazi-friendly Arrow Cross Party (NyKP) in power. Following the Siege of Budapest the capital fell to the Soviets on 13 February 1945 and the government fled.

== See also ==
- Hungary in World War II
- Operation Achse

== Books and articles ==
- Aronson, Shlomo (2004). Hitler, the Allies, and the Jews. Cambridge: Cambridge University Press. ISBN 9780521838771.
- Bauer, Yehuda (1994). Jews for Sale? Nazi-Jewish Negotiations, 1933-1945. New Haven: Yale University Press. ISBN 9780300068528.
- Borhi, Laszlo (2024). Survival under Dictatorships: Life and Death in Nazi and Communist Regimes. Budapest: Central European Press.
- Braham, Randolph L. (Summer 1977). "The Jewish Question in German-Hungarian Relations during the Kállay Era". Jewish Social Studies. 39 (3): 183–208.
- Cohen, Asher (Spring 1984). "Continuity in the Change: Hungary, 19 March 1944". Jewish Social Studies. 46 (2): 131–144.
- Cornelius, Deborah S (2011). Hungary in World War II: Caught in the Cauldron. New York: Fordham University Press. ISBN 978-0823233441.
- Siemens, Daniel (2017). Stormtroopers: A New History of Hitler's Brownshirts. New Haven: Yale University Press. ISBN 978-0300231250.
- Turbucz, Dávid (Winter 2025). "Under the Influence of His Leader Cult: Miklós Horthy's Self-Image During World War II". Hungarian Studies Review. 52 (1): 67–85.
- Weinberg, Gerhard (2004). A World In Arms A Global HIstory of World War Two. Cambridge University Press: Cambridge.
