= Gyula Kadar =

Gyula Kadar may refer to:

== People ==
- Gyula Kádár (born 1898–1982), Hungarian military officer and writer
- János Kádár (b. 1912–1989) Hungarian communist party and government leader

== Fictional characters ==
Count Gyula Kadar, Trinity Blood character
