= Keve =

Mythical 4th century Hun leader

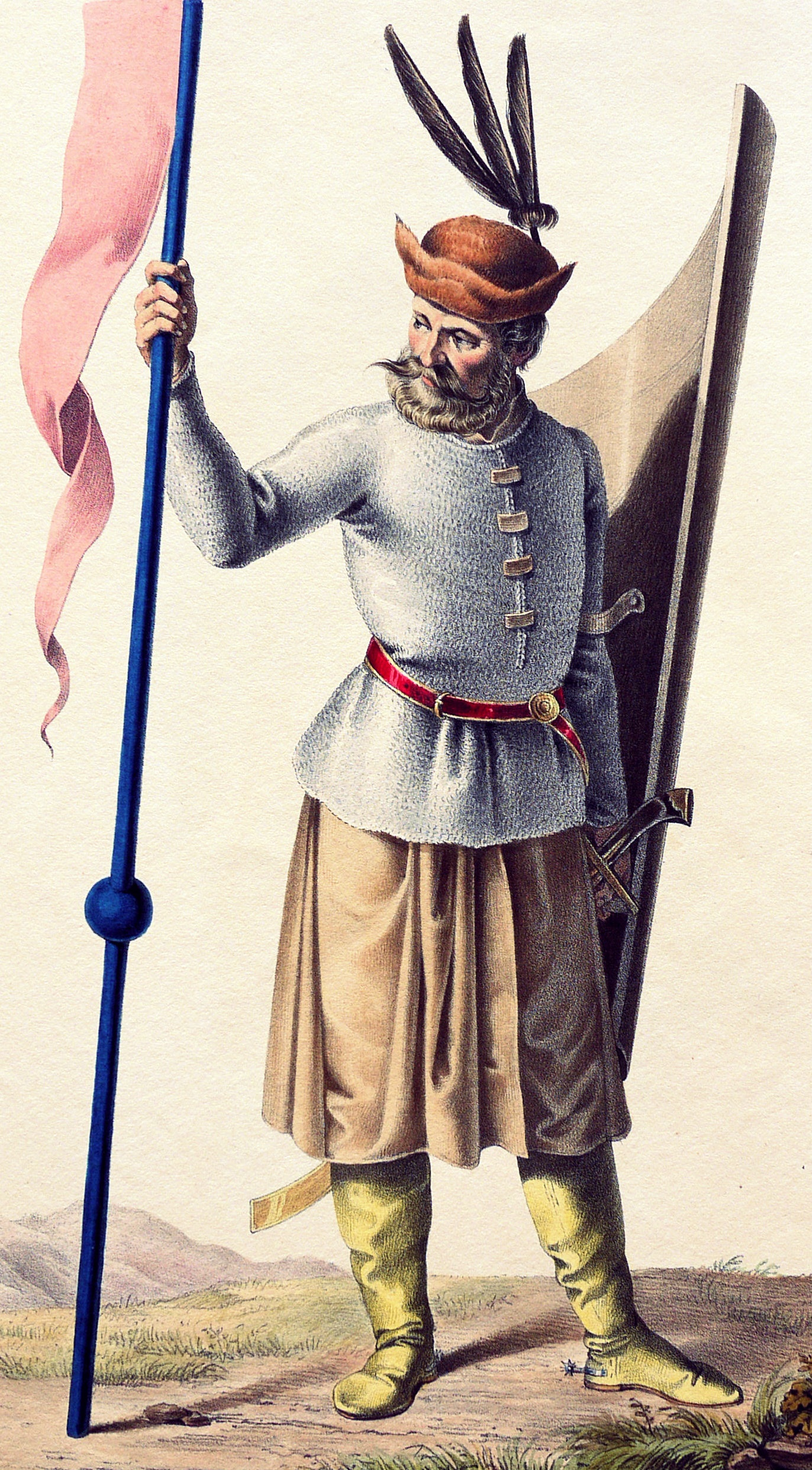
- Colored lithograph by Josef Kriehuber
- Born: Unknown date
- Died: Tárnok Valley

Keve, the son of Csele of the Zemény clan, was a legendary Hun leader in the 4th century. Keve was captain of a group of soldiers who headed west into Pannonia in the late 4th century. They fought against the armies of Prince Macrinus from Lombardy. As Huns settled on his land above the Tisza, he felt that his country was being destroyed. Living within the Roman Empire, he asked the Romans for help fighting against the Huns.

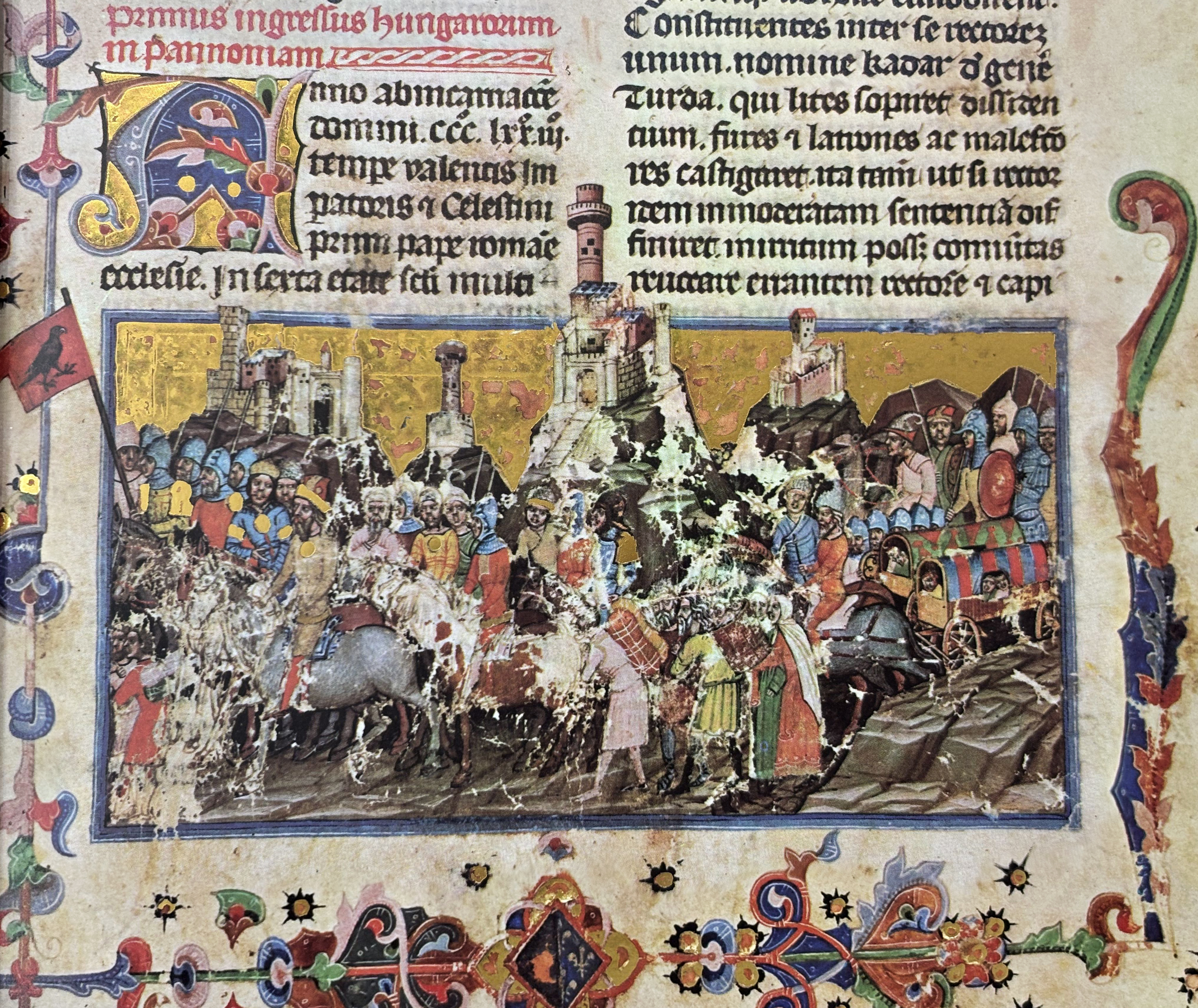
"The first arrival of Hungarians, that is the Huns in Pannonia" depicted in the Chronicon Pictum

Detre of Verona and his army of Italians, Germans, and other peoples joined forces with Macrinus at Sicambria, where they were attacked by the Huns in the middle of the night. Detre and Macrinus fought several days in retaliation on the field of Tárnok Valley, across the Tisza, and near the town of Tulln (now in Austria, not far from Vienna). There were heavy losses on both sides, including Captain Keve, who died during the Battle of the Tárnok Valley.

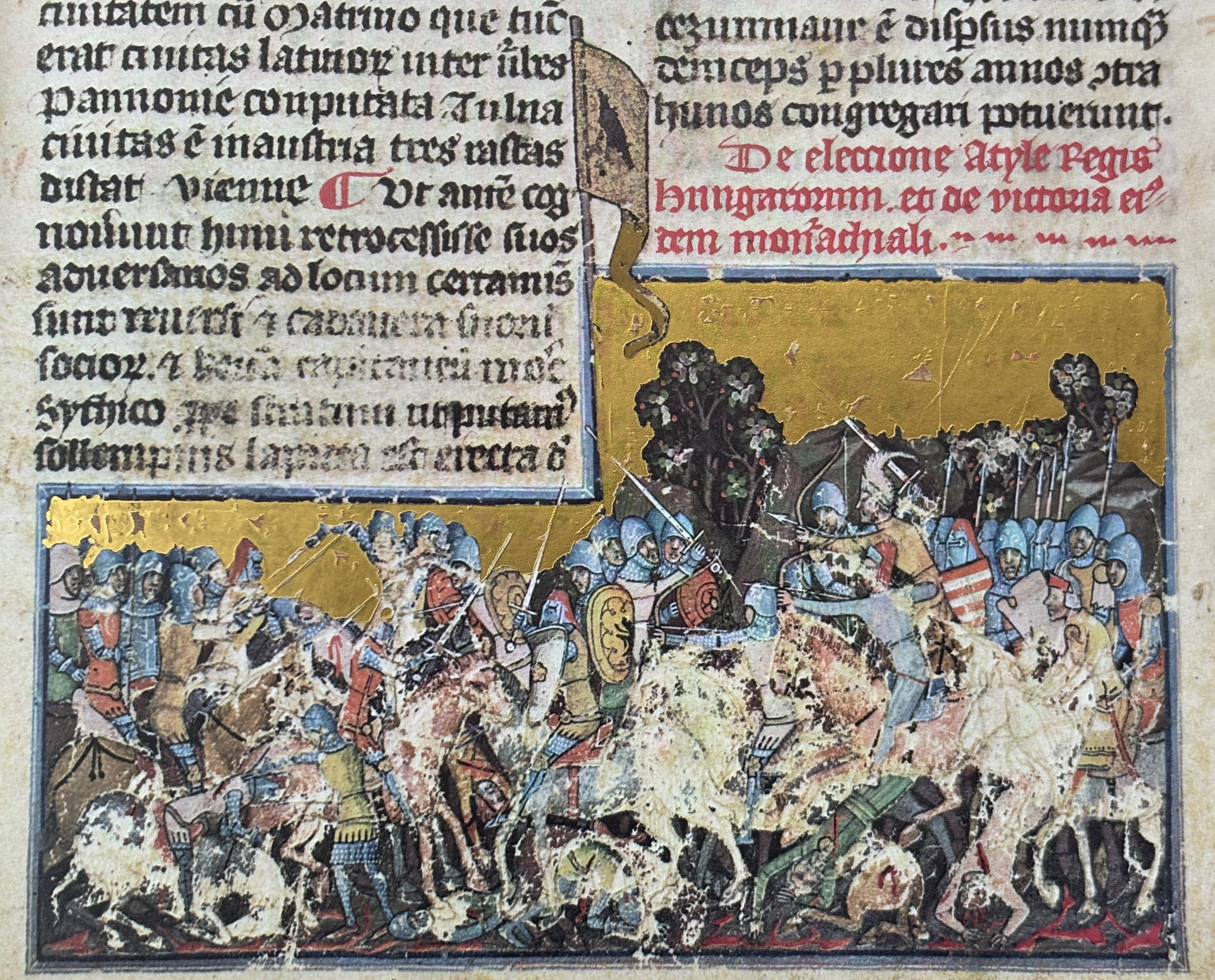
Attila’s battle with the Romans at Zeiselmauer depicted in the Chronicon Pictum

125,000 Huns were killed that day, among them, Captain Keve also fell in the battle. 210,000 men from the army of Detre and Macrinus perished there, not counting those who were killed under the tents. Detre saw the great loss his people had suffered in the battle, on the second day after the battle, he marched with Macrinus towards the city of Tulln, which was then a Latin seat and counted among the cities of Pannonia. The city of Tulln locates in Austria, three stations away from Vienna. When the Huns understood that their enemies had withdrawn, they returned to the battlefield and buried the corpses of their comrades and Captain Keve according to Scythian custom, – we think – by the side of the highway, an ornate stone idol was erected there, that place, that region was named Keveháza.

— Mark of Kalt, Chronicon Pictum

In the end, Macrinus was killed and Detra was wounded by an arrow to his head. The Roman army fled. Keve is believed to be buried by the side of the highway "according to the Scythian custom" with other Hunnic leaders, including Kadocsa and Bela. The region where he was buried was called Keveháza and a decorative stone idol was placed near his burial site. After his death, the Hun king Attila was also buried next to these men.

According to the legend, Keve's daughter Ríka (Réka in today's form) was married to the Hun king Attila.

== See also ==
- Kádár (Hun judge)
- History of Hungary before the Hungarian Conquest
