= Kádár (Hun judge) =

Hun judge

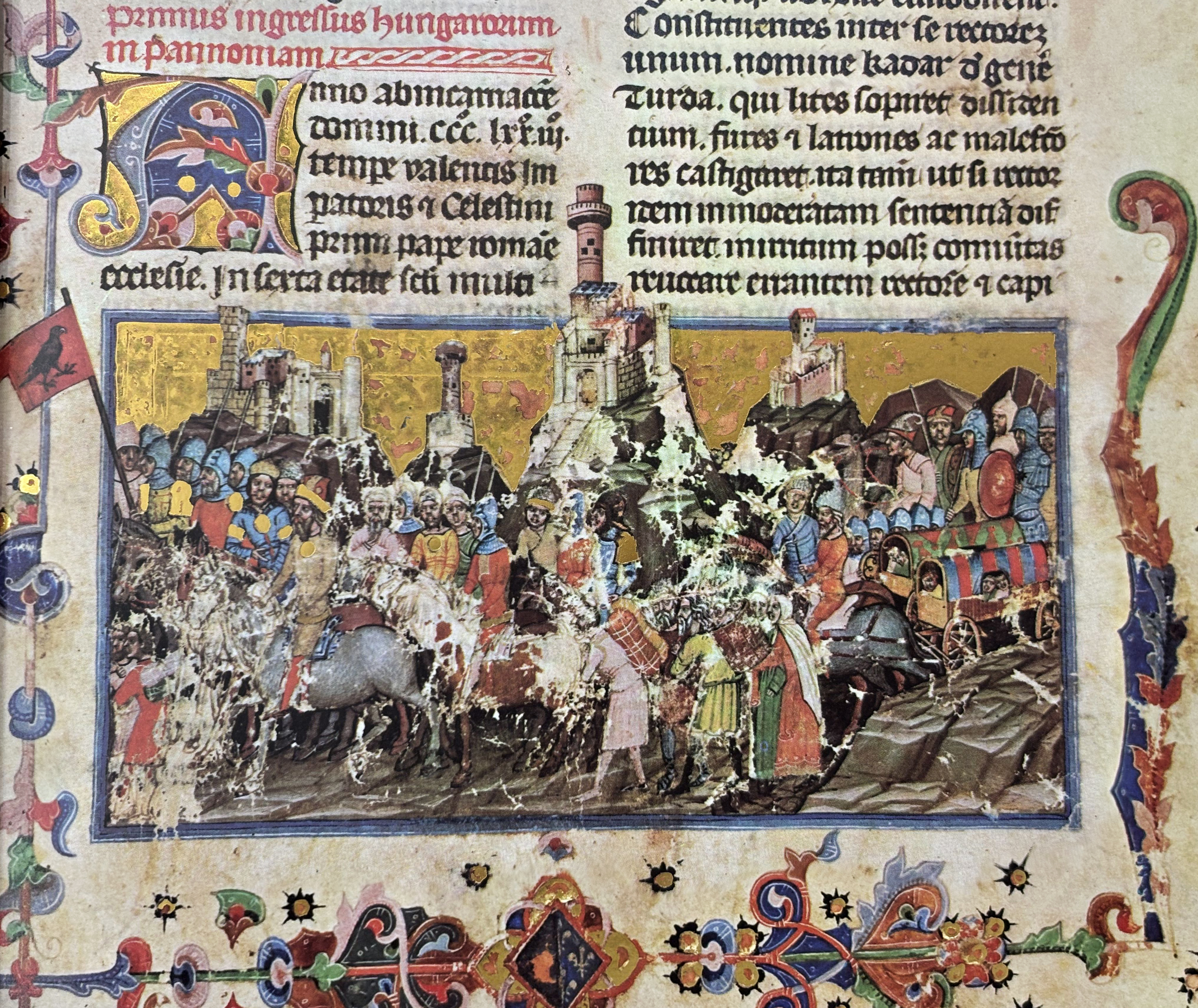
The Huns arrival in Pannonia from the Chronicon Pictum (14th century)

Kádár is a Hun judge mentioned in Hungarian chronicles. He is said to have moved with the other Huns from Scythia to Pannonia, where his fellow countrymen appointed him judge among themselves.

Mark of Kalt, in the Chronicon Pictum, wrote:

"In the 373rd year of Our Lord’s birth, in the time of Emperor Valens and Pope Celestine I, in the Six Ages of the World, the Huns living in the Scythia multiplied, they got together and appointed captains from among themselves: Béla, Keve the son of Csele of the Zemény clan, and Kadocsa, Attila, Keve, Buda the sons of Bendegúz of the Kadar clan, and then they decided to push into the western regions. Ten times one hundred thousand warriors were chosen from the one hundred and eight tribes, that is, ten thousand from each tribe, leaving the rest of the Huns in Scythia to protect their seat and country from the enemy. They also chose a judge from among themselves, a man named Kádár of the Torda clan, to handle the trials of the disputants and to punish thieves, rogues and evildoers, yet in such a way that if the judge gives an unfair sentence, the community can nullify it, and depose the erring judge and the captains whenever they want."

His name could be associated with the word karcha, which at the time meant "judge". Alternatively, it could derive from a Khazar title (similar to the later Hungarian title of count palatine) used for a Khazar dignitary.
