= Dinanath Mishra =

Indian journalist

- Born: 1937; Gaya, Bihar, India
- Died: 12 November 2013 (aged 75–76)
- Occupations: Journalist; writer; politician
- Known for: Author of RSS: Myth and Reality; Editorship of Panchjanya and Navbharat Times; Former Rajya Sabha MP
- Notable work: RSS: Myth and Reality
- Office: Member of Parliament, Rajya Sabha (1998–2004)
- Political party: Bharatiya Janata Party

Dinanath Mishra (or Dina Nath Mishra; 1937–2013) was an Indian journalist and writer belonging to the Hindu nationalist movement. He authored a seminal work RSS: Myth and Reality on the Rashtriya Swayamsevak Sangh (RSS) from a nationalist point of view. He was elected to the Upper House of the Indian Parliament (Rajya Sabha) and served a five-year term.

== Life and career ==
Mishra was born in 1937 in Gaya, Bihar. His father was Indranath Mishra. He had to struggle during his early life, working as a child labourer, but would eventually complete his education and earn a Master of Arts degree. He also became a volunteer (swayamsevak) of the Rashtriya Swayamsevak Sangh (RSS).

He served as the editor of the RSS in-house newspaper Panchjanya, from 1971 to 1974. Later, he moved to Navbharat Times, heading its bureau in Delhi and, subsequently, its Patna edition.

Having joined the Bharatiya Janata Party, he was elected as a member of the Rajya Sabha from 1998 to 2004, during the Premiership of Atal Bihari Vajpayee.

Jointly with Balbir Punj, he founded the India First Foundation, which published the magazine Eternal India (as well as its Hindi-language version Chirantan Bharat). It also acquired an edited collection titled Sonia: The Unknown (Sonia ka sach in Hindi), which includes biographical details of Sonia Gandhi and raises questions based on her foreign origin.

Mishra died on 12 November 2013. He is survived by his wife, son and three daughters.

Senior BJP leader Balbir Punj called him a true swayamsevak dedicated to the cause of Hindutva. Rakesh Sinha of the India Policy Foundation called him a cultural nationalist that served and "survived in a secularist atmosphere."

== Publications ==
English

- RSS: Myth and Reality (Vikas, 1980), ISBN 0706910206.

Hindi

- Hara-hara vyangye (Prabhata Prakasana, 1999), ISBN 8173152942.
- Pāpī vota ke lie (in Hindi, Pratibha Pratishthana, 2002), ISBN 8188266078
- Chaploosi Rekha (Prabhat Prakashan), ISBN 8188139270.

Mishra's RSS: Myth and Reality is an early work on RSS and puts forward the RSS point of view. It is often cited in academic sources for this reason. According to Mishra, RSS believes that modernity destroys cultural identity and suffocates dharma and divides the Hindu people. "Signs of disintegration appear in the family, village and communal life" in the words of Dattopant Thengadi. Mishra says, "the ersatz, sloganistic secularism has done great harm to the nation."
