= M. A. Kadar =

Indian politician

Mohideen A. Kadar (born 5 November 1942) is an Indian politician from the Dravida Munnetra Kazhagam. He served as a member of the Rajya Sabha from 1998 to 2003. Kadar is married to Safia Kadar. The couple have 3 sons and 1 daughter.
