= Gyula Kádár =

Hungarian military officer (1898–1982)

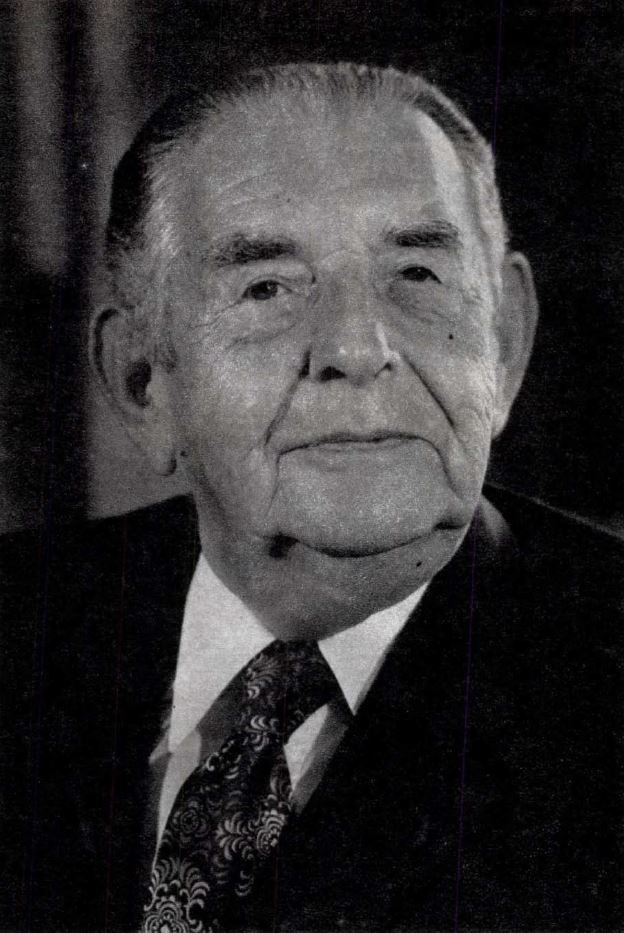
- Born: 16 December 1898; Debrecen, Austria-Hungary
- Died: 14 March 1982 (aged 83); Budapest, Hungary
- Military career
- Allegiance: Austria-Hungary; Kingdom of Hungary
- Rank: Colonel
- Commands: 6th Department of the General Staff (1942.05.-1943.08.); 2nd Department of the General Staff (1943.08.-1944.03.)
- Conflicts: World War II

Gyula Kádár (16 December 1898 – 14 March 1982) was a Hungarian military officer who was the head of the Hungarian military intelligence from August 1943 until the occupation of Hungary by Nazi German forces during World War II.

== Biography ==
From 1912 to 1916 he studied at the Royal Hungarian Military High School, in Sopron. After graduation, he continued his studies at the Royal Hungarian Ludovica Defense Academy. On 17 August 1918, he graduated as a lieutenant.

During the revolutions of 1918/19 he served with the 5th Infantry Regiment, in Szeged. In November 1919, he joined as an officer to the National Army, which was a counter-revolutionary force under the command of Miklós Horthy. Soon he became a company commander in a newly formed infantry regiment in Szeged. In 1922 he was promoted to First Lieutenant and transferred to Debrecen.

In 1933 he became a teacher on the Ludovika Academy, where he taught infantry tactics for artillery officers. In 1937, he was promoted to Major and took over the teaching of military tactics. 1939 he was transferred to Pécs, as the head of the training department of the IV Corps. After the mobilization he became the Deputy Chief of Staff for Logistics of the corps. In September 1940, he took part with the IV Corps in the entry to Northern Transylvania, and in the spring of 1941 in the invasion of Yugoslavia. A protégé of Ferenc Szombathelyi, his career rose rapidly after Szombathelyi was appointed chief of the general staff in September 1941.

In January 1942, he was promoted to colonel and in May 1942 he was transferred to the General Staff, as the head of the Vezérkari Főnökség 6 or VKF-6, the Sixth Department of the General Staff (which department was dedicated to dealing with national security and propaganda affairs).

On August 1, 1943, he became the leader of the VKF-2, the Second Department of the General Staff (intelligence and counter-intelligence). In September 1943, he was informed by Ottó Hátszeghy, the military attaché to Bulgaria, that he had been invited to attend an international trade fair in İzmir and to see the American pavilion. Several of the American officials operating their pavilion were known to be agents of the Office of Strategic Services (OSS), the precursor of the Central Intelligence Agency. Both Kádár and Szombathelyi knew Hátszeghy well. Kádár gave Hátszeghy approval to attend the trade fair. On 8 October 1943, Hátszeghy arrived in Budapest to see Kádár and to show him the radio that the OSS had given him. Through Hátszeghy, Kádár established a link with the OSS that lasted until February 1944. Kádár hid the radio that the OSS had given Hátszeghy in the piano of his mistress, the actress Katalina Varga-Karady.

On the orders of General Ferenc Szombathelyi he prepared plans to the Hungarian Army to help and support the landing of British paratroopers and airborne troops in Hungary, which scenario was proposed by the British on the secret negotiations with the Kállay government. Kádár warned his superiors of the threat of a German invasion in early 1944. In February 1944 he contacted Endre Bajcsy-Zsilinszky, a well-known anti-Nazi politician and resistance leader in order to help Regent Horthy's plans to withdraw Hungary from the war by forming a broad coalition of anti-Nazi political forces.

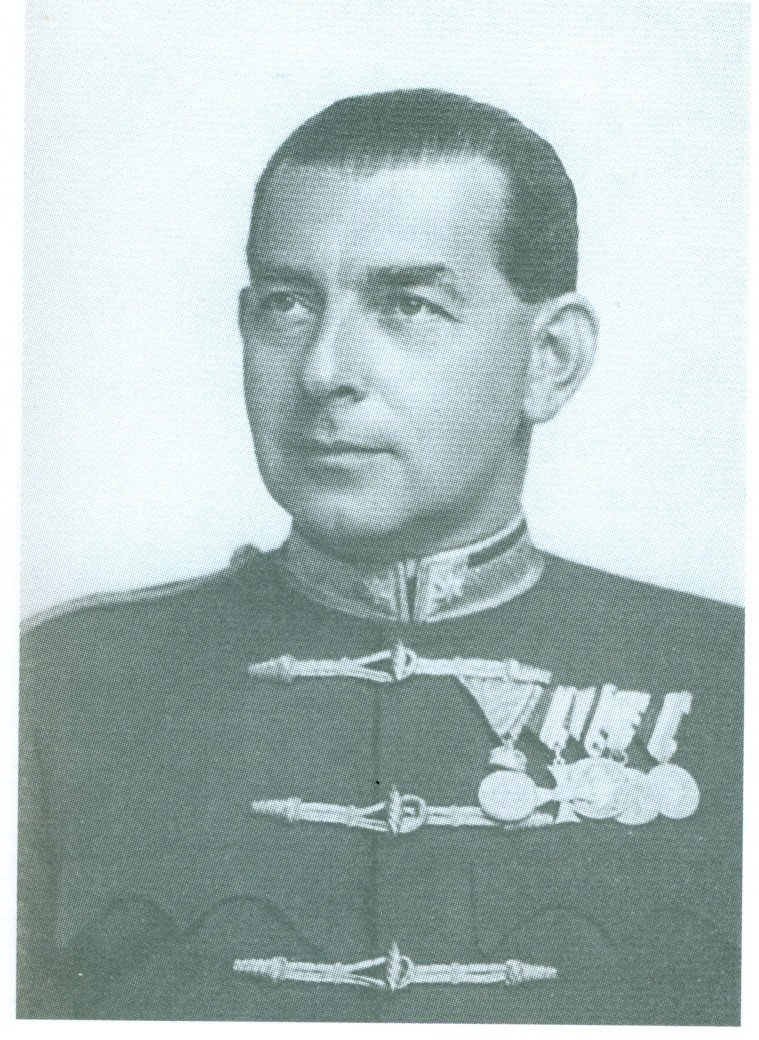
Gyula Kádár as an officer in World War Two.

Following a tip, the Gestapo raided the home of Varga-Karady and found the OSS radio set in her piano. The Gestapo knew precisely where the radio set had been hidden. The two leading suspects as to who provided the tip are Hátszeghy and Friz Laufer, a double agent in the OSS secret network in Eastern Europe. On 17 April 1944 Kádár was arrested by the Gestapo. After the intervention of Defence Minister Lajos Csatay and Miklós Horthy, Jr. he was handed over to the Hungarian authorities. The Hungarian Military Tribunal released him on 1 June 1944. Because of the German protest, the Chief of the General Staff János Vörös ordered his arrest again on 2 October 1944. After that, he was charged with high treason at the Special Court of the Chief of the General Staff, but he was acquitted from all charges on 14 October 1944. A day later, after the coup of the Arrow Cross Party he was again arrested by the order of the new, pro-Nazi Defence Minister Károly Beregfy. As the Soviet Army approached Budapest he was transferred to Sopronkőhida and later in March, 1945 to Germany. He was released from captivity by the US Army near Triften, Bavaria.

He was arrested on 20 September 1945, when he entered Hungary at Hegyeshalom by the Military Political Department (the new military intelligence agency under communist leadership). He was handed over to the Soviets, and a Soviet military tribunal sentenced him to 15 years forced labor in the Soviet Union, as a war criminal. He returned home 10 years later, in 1955. When he entered the country he was arrested and investigated again, until he was released from captivity on 25 September 1956.

His memoirs, From the Ludovika to Sopronkőhida were first published, heavily censored, in 1978.

== Books and articles ==
- Article of the Hungarian Reference Encyclopedia on Gyula Kádár (in Hungarian) OSZK National Library - Kádár Gyula.
- Bauer, Yehuda (1994). Jews for Sale? Nazi-Jewish Negotiations, 1933-1945. New Haven: Yale University Press. ISBN 9780300068528.
- Cornelius, Deborah S (2011). Hungary in World War II: Caught in the Cauldron. New York: Fordham University Press. ISBN 978-0823233441.
