= Kiska (disambiguation) =

Kiska is an island in the Rat Islands group of the Aleutian Islands of Alaska. It may also refer to:

== Places ==
- Kiska Harbor, Kiska island
- Kiska Volcano, Kiska island
- Kiska, Estonia, village in Lääneranna Parish, Pärnu County, Estonia
- Kiska, Altai Republic, village in Russia

== Other ==
- Kiska (surname), list of people with the surname
- Kiska (orca), an orca at Marineland of Canada
- USNS Kiska, a former United States Navy supply ship launched in 1972
- USCGC Kiska, United States Coast Guard Island-class cutter
- KISKA (Kisegitő Karhatalmi Alakulat), Hungarian security force in 1944–1945

== See also ==
- Little Kiska Island
