= Volunteer Regiment of Buda =

Hungarian Military unit during WW II

- Budai Önkéntes Ezred
- Active: January 1945 – 1 March 1945
- Country: Hungary
- Allegiance: (Kingdom of Hungary (1920–1946)) Provisional National Government of Hungary; Soviet Union
- Branch: Hungarian Democratic Army
- Type: Infantry Regiment
- Size: 1,913-2,500 men
- Colors: White, Red and Green
- Engagements: World War II; Budapest offensive; Siege of Budapest

Commanders
- Notable commanders: Lieutenant Colonel Oszkár Variházy

The Volunteer Regiment of Buda (Hungarian: Budai Önkéntes Ezred), was a World War II military force made up of prisoner of war (POW) volunteers from Hungary serving in the Soviet Red Army at the Battle of Budapest.

The regiment was led by Lieutenant Colonel Oszkár Variházy. Organization of the regiment began in late January 1945 at a villa on 17 Tárogató Street, by four Hungarian troops already fighting for the Soviet Union, one of which was Ferenc Krupiczer. By 12 February, 1945 the regiment consisted of twenty companies (12 original volunteers, 8 by later defectors and/or POWS captured by the Regiment) and 5 battalions, led by Lieutenant Colonel Oszkár Variházy, with between 1,913-2,500 men in total. On that same date, the Volunteer Regiment, along with soldiers of the Soviet 320th Infantry Division, took the citadel on Gellért Hill and Buda Castle. The Soviet brigade commander was so impressed that he hung the Regiment's flag next to his own on the castle. Approximately 600 men from this regiment were killed in action at Budapest.

While at first soldiers wore various insignia to distinguish them from the Hungarian forces serving the Germans (including a white ribbon with company number, a red ribbon, and red, white, and green ribbons), volunteers were issued a uniform red ribbon after 13 February, along with an identification card. After the war the surviving members were sent to the camp at Jászberény on 1 March where they were disbanded with a small number (those that had not been issued identification cards by the Soviets) treated as POWs. Elements of the regiment went on to form the 1st Division of the Hungarian People's Army

A bronze memorial was created in 1967 by sculptor Iván Szabó and architect Károly Jurcsik in Vérmező Park in 1967.

Another Hungarian regiment organized by the Soviets, the Kossuth Lajos Regiment, trained at the Talizi camp but was also ultimately disbanded and made POW in Ivanovo.

Makeup of the Regiment consisted of:

- 1 Lieutenant colonel
- 15 Captains
- 32 Senior lieutenants
- 47 Lieutenants
- 55 Junior lieutenants
- 819 Non-commissioned officers
- 1,565 Privates

== Bibliography ==
- Gosztony, Peter. Stalins Fremde Heere, Bernard & Graefe Verlag, 1991. ISBN 3-7637-5889-5.
