= Kiska (surname) =

Kiska is a surname. Slovak feminine form: Kisková. Notable people with the surname include:

- Andrej Kiska (born 1963), former President of Slovakia
- Megan Kiska, American military officer
- Peter Kiška (born 1981), Slovak footballer
