= Kiska, Altai Republic =

Kiska Киска
- Village
- Location within Altai Republic Location within Russia
- Coordinates: 52°03′N 86°29′E
- Country: Russia
- Region: Altai Republic
- District: Choysky District
- Time zone: UTC+7:00

Kiska (Russian: Киска; Altay: Кыска, Kıska) is a rural locality (a selo) in Choyskoye Rural Settlement of Choysky District, the Altai Republic, Russia. The population was 143 as of 2016. There are 4 streets.

== Geography ==
Kiska is located east from Gorno-Altaysk, in the valley of the Isha River, 11 km northwest of Choya (the district's administrative centre) by road. Gusevka is the nearest rural locality.
