= KISKA =

Hungarian armed organization during World War II

KISKA (Hungarian: Kisegitő Karhatalmi Alakulat) was a force attached to the Royal Hungarian Army during the brief period of Arrow Cross Party rule late in World War II. KISKA was activated by the Arrow Cross after the German takeover on 15 October 1944 and had replaced the Home Guard (Nemzetőrség) by early November. There was generally one KISKA battalion in each city and university. The force numbered some 7,000 noncombatants, mostly recruited from Budapest. It was jointly controlled by the Ministry of War and the Ministry of the Interior. The purpose of KISKA was to secure the hinterland. It was rapidly infiltrated by dissenters, deserters, leftists and Jews, becoming in effect "the legal cover of the organisations of resistance". It was regarded as a nuisance by the Germans. It was finally dissolved by the Arrow Cross government on 6 January 1945.

== Bibliography ==
- Bartha, Ákos (2022). "Terrorists and Freedom Fighters: Arrow Cross Party Militias, 'Ragged Guard' and 'KISKA' Auxiliary Forces in Hungary (1938–1945)". Studia historica Brunensia. 69 (2): 67–89. doi:10.5817/SHB2022-2-3.
- Benshalom, Rafi (2001). We Struggled for Life: The Hungarian Zionist Youth Resistance During the Nazi Era. Gefen Publishing House.
- Juhász, Gyula (1988). "Problems of the Hungarian Resistance after the German Occupation, 1944". In William Deakin; Elisabeth Barker; Jonathan Chadwick (eds.). British Political and Military Strategy in Central, Eastern and Southern Europe in 1944. Palgrave Macmillan. pp. 180–189.
- Ungváry, Krisztián (2005) [2002]. The Siege of Budapest: One Hundred Days in World War II. Translated by Ladislaus Löb. I. B. Tauris.
