= Budapest offensive =

Soviet military offensive 1944–1945

- Part of the Eastern Front of World War II
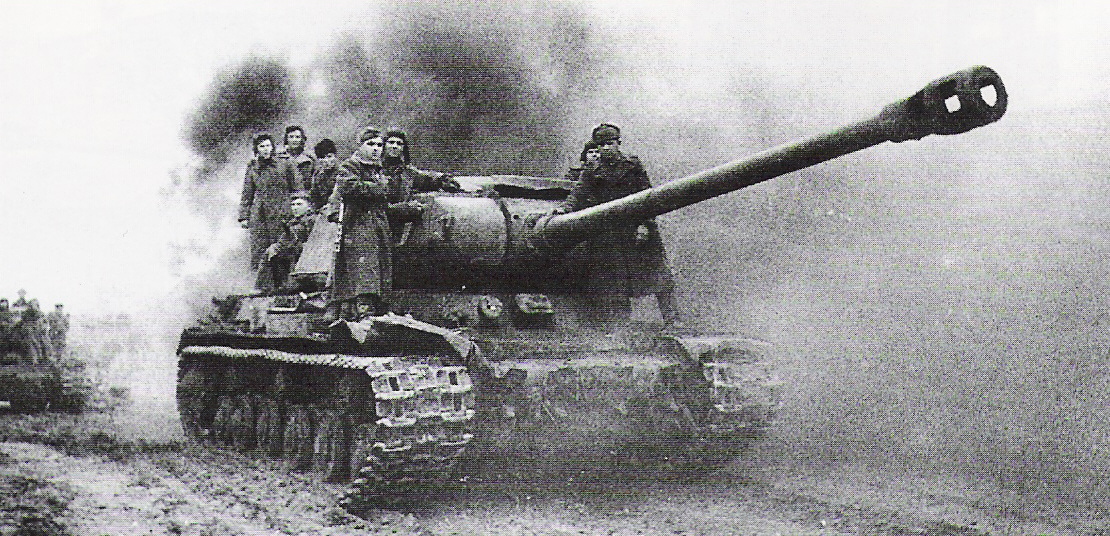
- Soviet IS-2 tank in action (Battle of Budapest)
| Date | 29 October 1944 – 13 February 1945; 108 days (3 months, 2 weeks and 1 day) |
| Location | Budapest and northwestern Hungary |
| Result | Allied victory |

Belligerents
| Soviet Union; Romania; Hungary (Debrecen government) | Germany; Hungary (Hungarist government) |

Commanders and leaders
| (Soviet Union) Rodion Malinovsky (Soviet Union) Fyodor Tolbukhin | (Nazi Germany) Johannes Friessner (Nazi Germany) Otto Wöhler (Kingdom of Hungary (1920–1946)) Károly Beregfy |

Units involved
| (Soviet Union) 2nd Ukrainian Front: (Soviet Union) 1st Guards Army; (Soviet Union) 6th Guards Army; (Soviet Union) 7th Guards Army; (Soviet Union) 27th Army; (Soviet Union) 40th Army; (Soviet Union) 46th Army; (Soviet Union) 53rd Army; (Kingdom of Romania) 1st Army; (Kingdom of Romania) 4th Army; (Kingdom of Hungary) Volunteer Regiment of Buda; (Soviet Union) 3rd Ukrainian Front: (Soviet Union) 4th Guards Army; (Soviet Union) 57th Army | (Nazi Germany) Army Group South: (Nazi Germany) 1st Panzer Army; (Nazi Germany) 2nd Panzer Army; (Nazi Germany) 6th Army; (Nazi Germany) 8th Army; (Kingdom of Hungary (1920–1946)) 1st Army; (Kingdom of Hungary (1920–1946)) 2nd Army; (Kingdom of Hungary (1920–1946)) 3rd Army |

Strength
| 719,000 | N/A |

Casualties and losses
| Soviet: 80,026 dead and missing 240,056 wounded and sick Total casualties: 320,082 (including 260,000 combat casualties); 1,766 tanks destroyed 4,127 guns and mortars 293 aircraft 135,100 small arms | Siege of Budapest: 125,000 combat casualties (48,000 killed, 26,000 wounded, 51,000 captured); Total: ~270,000 combat casualties |
- 76,000 civilian dead 38,000 civilians dead in the siege (7,000 executed); 38,000 died in labour or POW camps

The Budapest offensive was the general attack by Soviet and Romanian armies against Hungary and its Axis ally Nazi Germany. The offensive lasted from 29 October 1944 until the fall of Budapest on 13 February 1945. The campaign was one of the most difficult and complicated offensives by the Soviet Army in Central Europe. It resulted in a decisive victory for the USSR and led directly to the end of World War II in Europe.

== Prelude ==
Having secured Romania in the summer Iasi–Kishinev offensive, the Soviet forces continued their push in the Balkans. The Red Army occupied Bucharest on 31 August, then swept westward across the Carpathian Mountains into Hungary and southward into Bulgaria, with parts joining the Yugoslav Partisans in the Belgrade offensive. In the process, the Red Army's forces drew German reserves away from the Warsaw-Berlin central axis, encircled and destroyed the 6th Army (for the second time) and forced Army Group South Ukraine’s shattered 8th Army to withdraw west into Hungary.

== The offensive ==
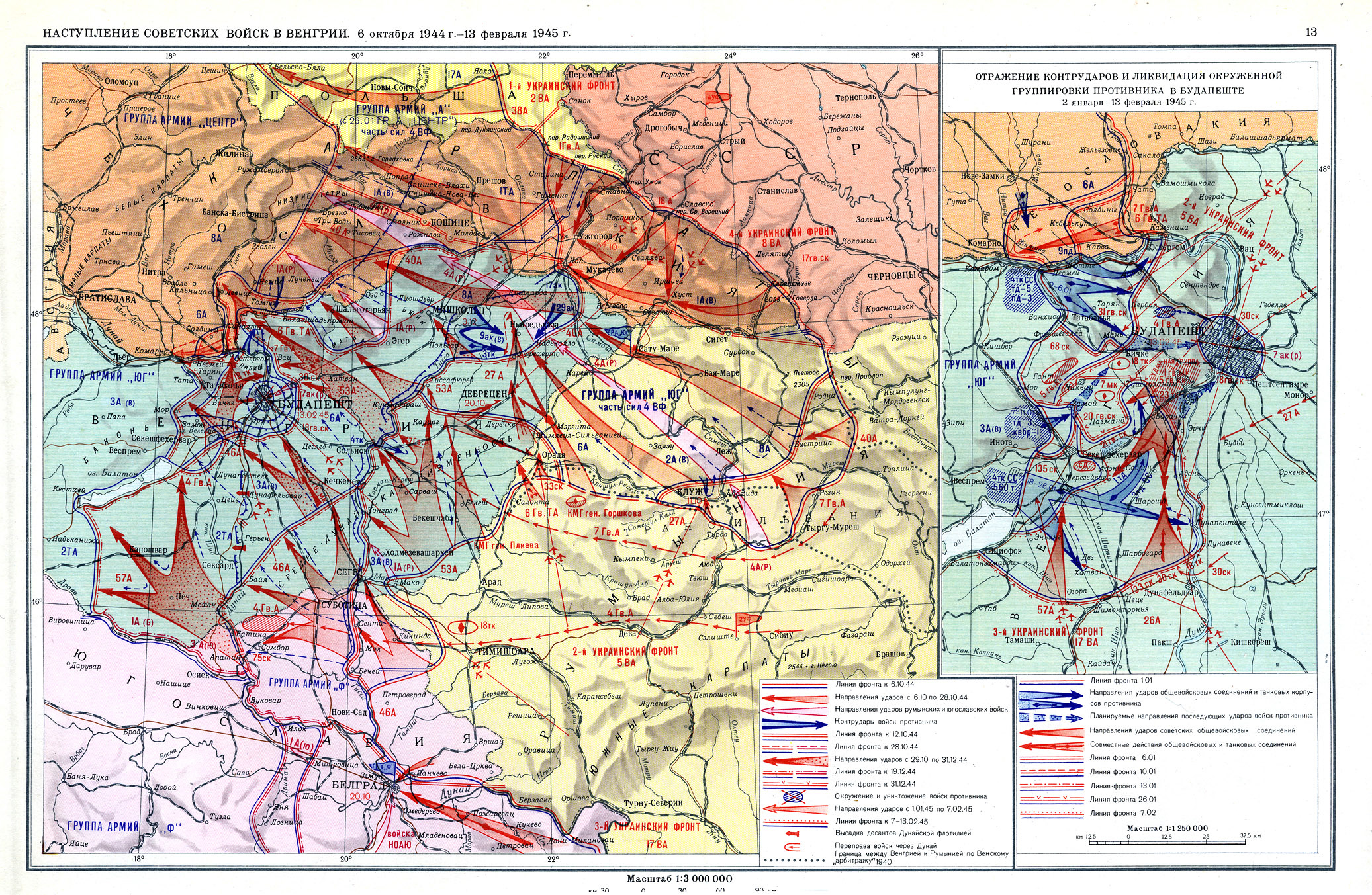
Budapest offensive

From October 1944, the 2nd, 3rd, and 4th Ukrainian Fronts advanced into Hungary. After isolating the Hungarian capital city in late December, the Soviets besieged and assaulted Budapest. On 13 February 1945, the city fell.

According to the historical documents, the Budapest offensive can be divided into five periods:

- The first (29 October 1944 - 3 November 1944) and second periods (7 November 1944 – 24 November 1944) were marked by the two large offensives of the 2nd Ukrainian Front, led by Rodion Malinovsky. The battles in these two periods were exceptionally bloody and fierce, since the Germans offered strong resistance against the Soviet onslaught. Though the Red Army managed to gain considerable territory, they failed to capture Budapest, due to the fierce German resistance and their own lack of offensive strength.
- In the third period (3 December 1944 – 26 December 1944), the 3rd Ukrainian Front of Fyodor Tolbukhin reached the Danube river after liberating Belgrade, and thus greatly enhanced Soviet offensive power in Hungary. Now with adequate forces, the Soviet fronts launched a two-pronged attack north and south of Budapest, finally encircling the city and trapping about 79,000 German and Hungarian troops inside the Budapest pocket.
- The fourth period (1 January 1945 – 26 January 1945) was marked by a series of strong counter-offensives launched by German reinforcements in an attempt to relieve the siege of Budapest. Some German units managed to penetrate deep into the outskirts of the city, with the most successful ones only 25 km away from the Hungarian capital. However, the Soviets managed to withstand all the German attacks and maintain their encirclement.
- Finally, in the fifth period (27 January 1945 – 13 February 1945), the Soviets mustered their forces to eliminate the besieged defenders in the city. The German troops fought for about half a month more before surrendering on 13 February 1945, ending four months of bloody fighting in the Budapest area. Out of the estimated 79,000 defenders, fewer than 1,000 managed to avoid death or captivity.

After the Budapest offensive, the main forces of Army Group South virtually collapsed. The road to Vienna, Czechoslovakia and the southern border of Germany was widely open for the Soviets and their allies.

According to Soviet claims, the Germans and Hungarians in Budapest lost 49,000 dead soldiers, with 110,000 captured and 269 tanks destroyed.

== Aftermath ==
As most of the German forces in the region were destroyed, troops were rushed in from the Western Front and, in March, the Germans launched the ill-fated Operation Spring Awakening (Unternehmen Frühlingserwachen) in the Lake Balaton area. The expansive goals of this operation were to protect one of the last oil producing regions available to the Axis and to retake Budapest. Neither goal was achieved.

In Soviet propaganda, this offensive (together with the Belgrade Offensive and the East Carpathian Offensive) was listed as one of Stalin's ten blows.

== See also ==
- Siege of Budapest
- Operation Spring Awakening (Unternehmen Frühlingserwachen)
- Soviet occupation of Hungary
