= Dietrich von Jagow =

German naval officer and Nazi diplomat

Dietrich Wilhelm Bernhard von Jagow
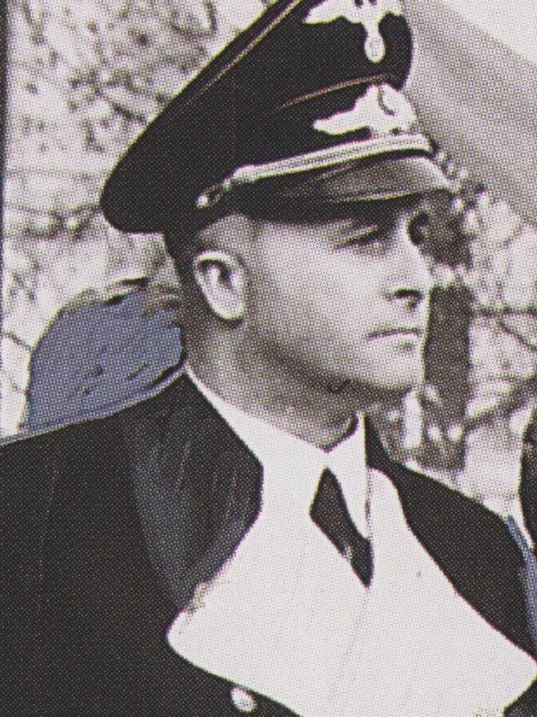
- Jagow in December 1941

German Ambassador to Hungary
- In office 29 June 1941 – 19 March 1944
- Preceded by: Otto von Erdmannsdorff
- Succeeded by: Edmund Veesenmayer

Additional positions
- 1932–1945: Reichstag member
- 1933–1945: Prussian State Council member
- 1934–1945: Brandenburg Provincial Councilor
- 1935–1945: Berlin City Councilor

Personal details
- Born: 29 February 1892 Frankfurt an der Oder, Province of Brandenburg, Kingdom of Prussia, German Empire
- Died: 26 April 1945 (aged 53) Meran, Operational Zone of the Alpine Foothills, Italian Social Republic
- Cause of death: Suicide
- Occupation: Naval officer Diplomat
- Known for: Advancing the Holocaust in Hungary
- Civilian awards: Golden Party Badge

Military service
- Allegiance: German Empire; Weimar Republic; Nazi Germany
- Branch/service: Imperial German Navy; Reichsmarine; Kriegsmarine
- Years of service: 1912–1920; 1933–1941
- Rank: Oberleutnant zur See; Korvettenkapitän
- Commands: 18th Flotilla
- Battles/wars: World War I Kapp Putsch; Silesian Uprisings; World War II
- Military awards: Iron Cross, 1st and 2nd class Clasp to the Iron Cross, 1st and 2nd class

Dietrich Wilhelm Bernhard von Jagow (29 February 1892 – 26 April 1945) was a German naval officer, politician, SA-Obergruppenführer and diplomat. He served as the German ambassador to Hungary from 1941 to 1944, and committed suicide just before the end of the Second World War in Europe.

== Early life and naval career ==
Jagow was born into a distinguished aristocratic family in Frankfurt an der Oder. Gottlieb von Jagow, who served as the German foreign minister was his cousin. Jagow ascribed to the typical Junker values of militarism, nationalism and a deep devotion to serving the state. After attending the Mürwik Naval School, he joined the Imperial German Navy as a naval cadet on 1 April 1912. During the First World War, he served on surface ships and on U-boats. Jagow began the war in 1914 as a Leutnant zur See and, by the end of the war, had risen to the rank of Oberleutnant zur See and had been awarded the Iron Cross, 1st and 2nd class. After the armistice of 11 November 1918, he remained in the new Reichsmarine and commanded a torpedo boat and a minesweeper.

== Völkisch activist ==
In September 1919, Jagow joined the Marinebrigade Ehrhardt of the Freikorps and took part in the Kapp Putsch of March 1920. Refusing to take an oath of loyalty to the Weimar Republic, he left the Reichsmarine later in March 1920. Settling in Bavaria, he joined the right-wing terrorist group Organisation Consul that assassinated pro-Weimar politicians. His first job was as a sales agent for the Bavarian Wood Processing Company, which was a front for the Organisation Consul. In the fall of 1920, he joined the Nazi Party (NSDAP) and in early 1921 he joined the SA. In the spring of 1921, he fought against the Poles in Silesia. Jagow's company commander during the Silesian war was Baron Manfred von Killinger, who remained a close associate thereafter.

In January 1922, Adolf Hitler sent Jagow to set up the first NSDAP group in Tübingen, and Jagow subsequently became one of the most important Nazi leaders in Württemberg. Jagow worked as a guest lecturer at Eberhard Karls University. Jagow was also part of the management of the famous Osiander bookstore in Tübingen, a position he was able to secure as two other former naval officers were part of the management team. In April 1922 Hitler appointed Jagow SA inspector and chief of staff for Württemberg. As a professor, Jagow used his lecture podium as a chance to preach völkisch theories to his students.

German universities were traditionally strongholds of the völkisch movement, and the university town of Tübingen was a center of völkisch activities. The Social Democratic police president of Württemberg, Hermann Schützinger, who visited Tübingen in 1926 complained the city was very much dominated by the völkisch right. Schützinger noted that everywhere he went in Tübingen he saw photographs of Hitler and Erich Ludendorff prominently displayed "next to all kinds of antisemitic Germanic kitsch spat out by the metropolis" while "stubborn small-town professors" used their lectures to indoctrinate their students in the völkisch ideology. In such a climate, Jagow found his niche in Tübingen as a professor and SA leader. On 24 June 1922, the German foreign minister Walther Rathenau was assassinated by members of the Organisation Consul, which reviled him both as a Jew and a supposed contributor to "creeping communism" for having negotiated the Treaty of Rapallo with Soviet Russia. The subsequent police investigation into Rathenau's assassination led to Jagow being interviewed as a possible suspect, though he was never charged. However, the police investigation did establish that Jagow spent much of his time leading his students in paramilitary training for the Organization Consul, which appeared to be his primary duty at the university.

After the failure of the Beer Hall Putsch at Munich in November 1923, Jagow left the NSDAP, but remained active in a number of völkisch groups in Württemberg. From 1923 to 1927, he was a member of the Bund Wiking (Viking League). In 1925, he led a group of völkisch university students into a street fight with the Reichsbanner Rote-Schwartz-Gold, the paramilitary wing of the Social Democratic Party (SPD). In 1927, he joined Der Stahlhelm, the military veterans association. In January 1929, he rejoined the NSDAP (membership number 110,438). As an early Party member, he would later be awarded the Golden Party Badge. From 1929 to 1930 he was the NSDAP Ortsgruppenleiter (Local Group Leader) in Esslingen am Neckar and the managing director of the NSDAP Gau Württemberg-Hohenzollern. In 1931 Jagow was appointed full-time SA group leader "Southwest", placing him in charge of all SA units in southwestern Germany. Starting in 1931, Jagow was engaged in a feud with Fritz Bauer, the Social Democratic judge who served as the chairman of the Stuttgart chapter of the Reichsbanner Rote-Schwartz-Gold. As a Social Democrat, a Jew and a homosexual, Bauer personified everything that Jagow hated. Jagow was well known as a militant anti-Semite and a devotee of the Führer principle. On 9 May 1932, Jagow was appointed as a deputy to the Reichstag to fill a vacancy from electoral constituency 31 (Württemberg). He remained a member of the Reichstag until his death in April 1945, representing electoral constituency 3 (Berlin-East) after the March 1936 election.

== Under the Nazi Regime ==
Starting in March 1933, Jagow served as the commissioner of the Württemberg state police. On 8 March 1933, Jagow was appointed police commissioner by Hitler using his powers under the Reichstag Fire Decree as a justification. As police commissioner, Jagow started what was described as a "reign of terror", allowing the Württemberg SA to beat up Jews, Communists and Social Democrats. On 9 March 1933, Jagow founded a hilfspolizei (auxiliary police) that consisted of members of the SA, SS, and the Stahlhelm under the pretext that a Communist revolution was imminent in Württemberg. On the night of 10 March 1933, Jagow had over 200 KPD members arrested without charge. Jagow had all of the offices belonging to the KPD and the SPD in Württemberg shut down as threats to public order. Shortly afterwards, Jagow had the hilfspolizei arrest the leaders of the Württemberg SPD and seized the offices and newspapers of the Social Democrats. In Stuttgart, he personally led the SA in shutting down the Communist and Social Democratic offices for Württemberg. Jagow seized all of the newspaper presses that belonged to the Communist and Social Democratic newspapers and then had the state of Württemberg sell the presses for a nominal sum to a Nazi publisher, Fritz Kiehn of Tubingen. The Nazis had much more success in winning the support of German Protestants while German Catholics by and large retained their loyalty to the Zenturm. As Germany was a Protestant majority country, this electoral limitation was not an insurmountable handicap but in Württemberg, which had a Catholic majority, the Nazis did not have the support of the majority of the people. Moreover, the working class of the industrial city of Stuttgart tended to vote for either the Social Democrats or the Communists. The sense of being a minority made the Württemberg Nazis inclined to use violent methods to impose their will on the population.

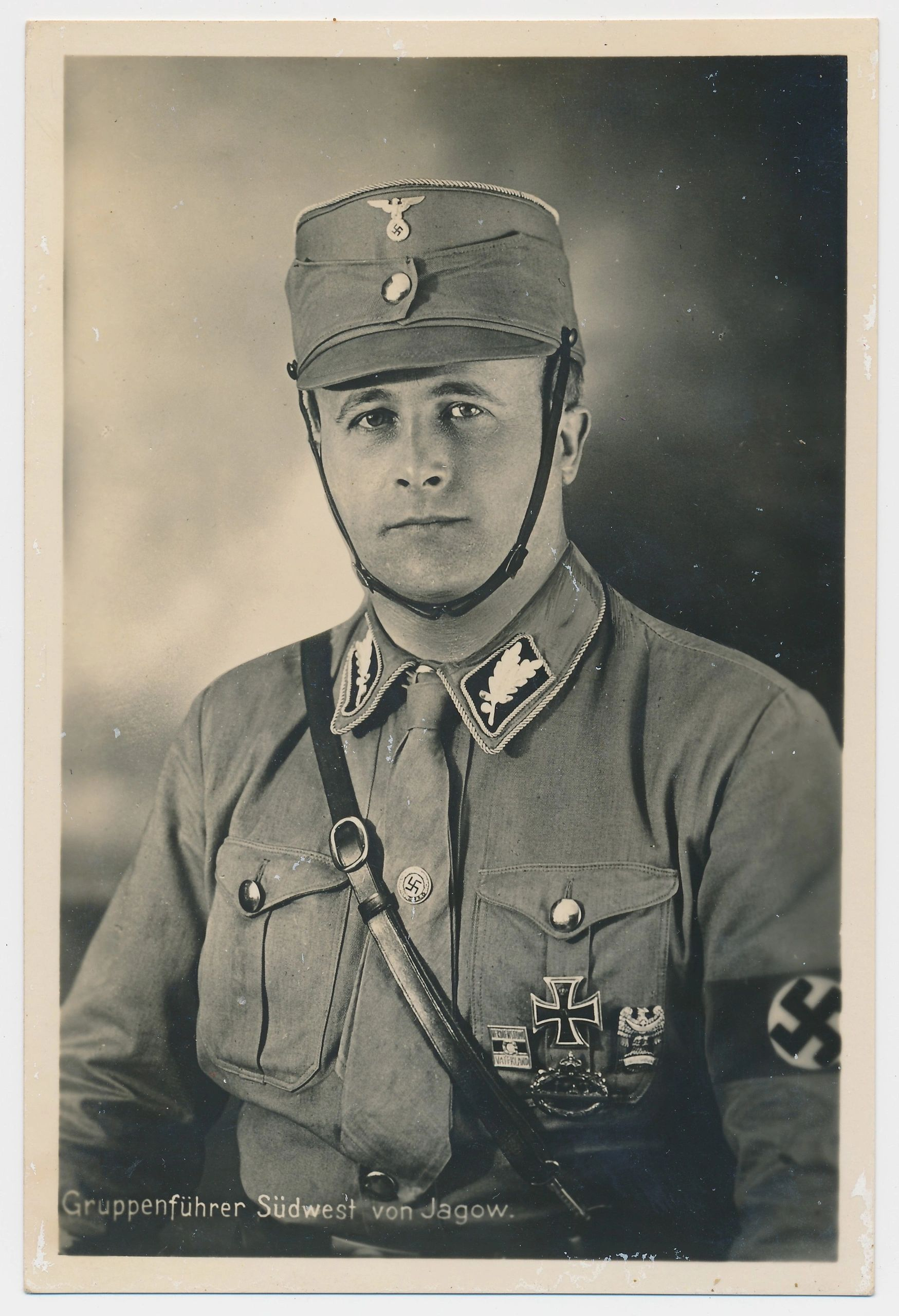
Dietrich von Jagow wearing his SA uniform, 1933.

On 23 March 1933, Jagow used his powers as police commissioner was to have the Württemberg state police arrest his archenemy Bauer in his office without charges. Jagow had a concentration camp built at Heuberg and organised the boycott of Jewish businesses in Württemberg as part of the national boycott of Jewish businesses on 1 April 1933. The Heuberg concentration camp had 1,902 people imprisoned within its fences when it was founded in March 1933 and within nine months, the number had risen to 15,000. Bauer was sent to the Heuberg camp, where he was beaten and humiliated by the SA guards. About 40 people who were held at Heuberg died as a result of beatings by the SA guards during Jagow's time as police commissioner, a fact that he proudly noted in his reports to Berlin. The Württemberg NSDAP was torn by a feud between Gauleiter Wilhelm Murr and his rival, the Minister President Christian Mergenthaler. Jagow, who backed the losing side in the feud, was transferred to Frankfurt am Main as leader of the SA-Obergruppe V. On 27 June 1933, he was promoted to the rank of SA-Obergruppenführer and, on 14 September 1933, he was appointed a member of the recently reconstituted Prussian State Council. During the Night of the Long Knives, Jagow was scheduled for execution by the SS, and was lucky to have survived. Jagow was saved by Hitler's intervention, who insisted that Jagow was a good Alter Kämpfer ("Old Fighter") who served the NSDAP well during the Kampfzeit ("struggle time", i.e the Nazi term for the years 1923-1933). Jagow was transferred to Berlin, where he headed the SA-Gruppe Berlin–Brandenburg from July 1934 to January 1942. In Berlin, Jagow was noted for his zeal in persecuting Jews. He obtained a seat on the Provincial Council of the Province of Brandenburg in 1934 and, in July of that year, he also received a five-year appointment as a lay judge at the People's Court. In 1935, he was elected to a seat on the Berlin City Council.

In 1935, Jagow left the Evangelical Church of Württemberg, of which he had been a long-time member, saying that his belief in National Socialism was no longer compatible with membership in the Evangelical Church. Jagow had resumed his naval career in 1933 as a reserve officer and served during the Spanish Civil War in 1936–1937 as an intelligence officer. In 1936, when the völkisch magazine Das innere Reich was banned following an article which implicitly criticized the idolisation of Frederick the Great under the Third Reich, the editors of Das innere Reich appealed to Jagow among other people for help. On 23 October 1936, the ban of Das innere Reich was lifted following the intervention of Rudolf Hess.

On the outbreak of the Second World War in September 1939, Jagow resumed his active duty status in the Kriegsmarine with the rank of Korvettenkapitän, initially commanding the minesweeper Tannenberg in the Baltic Sea. Jagow was always proud to be a Junker and combined traditional Junker values with Nazism. In a letter to his son written in September 1939, Jagow encouraged him to remember the Jagow family values, which he called "the tradition of honour, loyalty, knightliness and bravery". In the same letter, Jagow told his son not to be a Duckmäuser ("moral coward") and to stay faithful to the "National Socialist idea unto death". From October 1940 to April 1941, he commanded the 18th Flotilla of patrol boats, torpedo boats, and minesweepers in the English channel, leading his forces into nightly clashes with the Royal Navy for control of the channel. On 1 May 1941, he was discharged from the Kriegsmarine, having earned the Clasp to the Iron Cross, 1st and 2nd class.

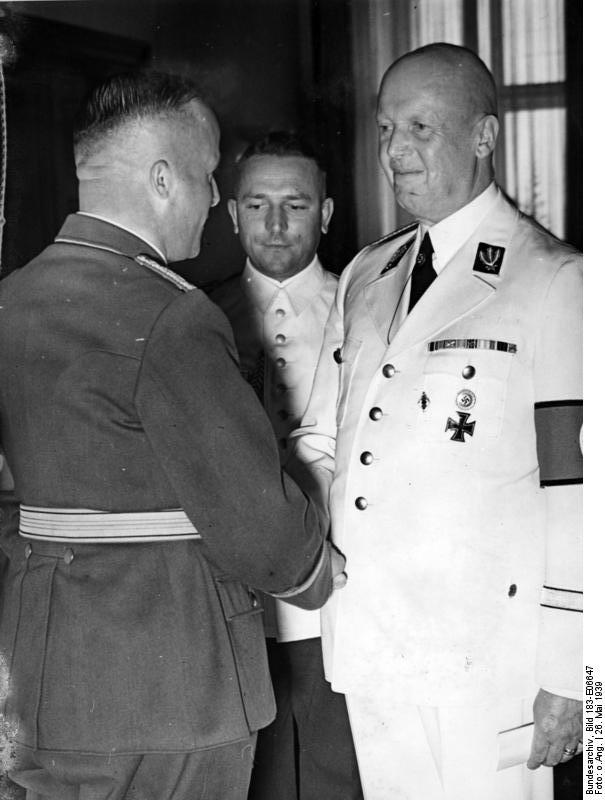
Jagow (back to the camera) with Hans Heinrich Lammers, 26 May 1939

In January 1941, long-standing rivalries between the Auswärtiges Amt (Foreign Office) and the SS exploded with the attempted coup d'état in Bucharest that saw SS back the coup by the Iron Guard under its leader Horia Sima against the Prime Minister, General Ion Antonescu while the Auswärtiges Amt together with the Wehrmacht back Antonescu. In the aftermath of the coup, the Foreign Minister Joachim von Ribbentrop made an effort to curb the power of the SS to conduct a foreign policy independent of the Auswärtiges Amt. Taking advantage of the long-standing rivalries between the SS and the SA, in 1941, Ribbentrop appointed an assemblage of SA men to head the German embassies in Eastern Europe, with Manfred von Killinger going to Romania, Siegfried Kasche to Croatia, Adolf-Heinz Beckerle to Bulgaria, Jagow to Hungary, and Hanns Ludin to Slovakia in order to ensure that there would be minimal co-operation with the SS. Ribbentrop believed that the traditional aristocratic diplomats who dominated the Auswärtiges Amt were too genteel to handle the SS, and wanted SA brawlers, whom he felt would be better in upholding the authority of the Auswärtiges Amt against the SS.

== Minister plenipotentiary in Budapest ==
The role of the SA ambassadors was that of "quasi-Reich governors" as they aggressively supervised the internal affairs of the nations they were stationed in, making them very much unlike traditional ambassadors. The aristocratic professional diplomats who dominated the Auswärtiges Amt saw the SA ambassadors as "outsiders", the disparaging term used by the professional diplomats to describe anyone who was not part of their clique. The German historian Daniel Siemans wrote that it was significant that four of the five SA ambassadors had served as policemen in their careers, suggesting it was their ability to impose their will on others as police chiefs that led them for them being appointed as ambassadors. From the viewpoint of Berlin, southeast Europe was viewed as the ergänzungsraum ("complementary space") to the lebensraum ("living space") in Eastern Europe. Unlike the lebensraum, which was to be colonised with millions of German settlers while the indigenous peoples living there would be exterminated, expelled or enslaved, the ergänzungsraum were seen as a source of food, raw materials and manpower that would assist the Reich in its quest for "world power status". Because the states in the ergänzungsraum were not to be colonised, the role of these states were seen as essentially protectorates of Germany that would be allowed a nominal independence as long as they played their role in the "New Order in Europe". Those who knew him reported that Jagow was "deeply unhappy" about serving as a diplomat as he much preferred to be fighting in the war.

Hungary was a society dominated by the Magyar nobility who owned most of the land and generally held almost all of the high offices of the Hungarian state. Under the rules introduced in 1922, Hungary had reverted back to the system that had existed before the Aster Revolution of 1918, which disfranchised men from poorer families from voting and holding office (Hungarian women regardless of their income level were not allowed to vote or hold office until 1946). The disfranchisement of Hungarians from poor families with the open ballot in effect allowed the Magyar aristocracy and gentry to completely dominate politics from 1919 to 1944. Hungary was nominally a democracy, but the open ballot, the disfranchisement of the poor, the open corruption surrounding elections and the thuggish antics of the gendarmes and the police made for a political system that was an oligarchy. The dominance of men from noble and gentry families on Hungarian politics eliminated the political left as a factor and during the Horthy era, the main divisions in Hungarian politics was between an extreme right-wing faction known as the conservatives vs. even more extreme right-wing faction known as the radicals. The traditional Hungarian elites had been greatly traumatised by defeat in the First World War, the Aster Revolution of 1918, the short-lived Hungarian Soviet Republic in 1919, and the Treaty of Trianon in 1920 which saw much of the lands of the Crown of St. István lost to Romania, Czechoslovakia and Yugoslavia.

Admiral Miklos Horthy, the Regent of Hungary who ruled in the name of the deposed Habsburg king-emperor who was supposedly going to be restored at some point, managed to "keep a foot in both camps of the right", but he tended to more adopt the rhetoric of the radicals while governing more like the conservatives. The twin obsessions of the Magyar elites during the Horthy era were an intense hostility to any sort of left-wing ideologies, especially Communism along with fantasies of taking back all of the lands lost under the Treaty of Trianon. Hungary saw itself as a victim of the post-war political order and naturally aligned itself with other states opposed to the post-war political order such as Germany. Horthy's obsession with undoing the Treaty of Trianon-which paralleled the German obsession with undoing the Treaty of Versailles-led naturally to a pro-German foreign policy, but however Horthy along with much of the Hungarian elite were painfully well aware that Hungary was too poor and backward to win back the lost lands of the Crown of St. István on its own as Hungary did not have the economic basis to maintain a modern military. The vast majority of Hungarians lived in a near-medieval level of poverty, and at least part of the reason for the obsession of Horthy with regaining the lost lands of the Crown of St. István was a way to distract ordinary Hungarians from questions of social reform. The way that substantial Magyar minorities in the lost lands came under the rule of the despised so-called "inferior races" such as the Romanians, Serbs, Czechs, Slovaks, and so fourth were greatly resented by the Magyar elite as an inversion of what was viewed as the natural order of things in Eastern Europe. Both the conservatives and the radicals favored anti-Semitic policies as both factions held the entire Hungarian Jewish community collectively responsible for the Hungarian Soviet Republic, but the conservatives tempered their anti-Semitism by arguing that the Hungarian economy collapse without the Jews. By contrast, the radicals were considerably more aggressive and militant in their anti-Semitism, and tended to agree with Nazi policies. Ever since the White counter-revolution in the 1919, the radicals had moved into an increasing fascistic direction, and by the late 1930s the radicals with their calls for intensified anti-Semitism at home and alliance with the Reich abroad were starting to challenge the dominance of the conservatives. The most important of the radical parties was the Arrow Cross Party, which called for a fascist regime.

In Hungary, the social ideal was to be a land-owning gentlemen and to work in business or the trades was considered to be shameful and disreputable. As Hungarian Jews because of their religion were not considered capable of being proper Hungarian gentlemen and ladies, the Hungarian Jewish community came to play an oversized role in the Hungarian economy. The Hungarian census of 1920 showed that 69% of Hungarian Jews were business owners or the salaried employees of businesses, 14% were employed as teachers or as professionals such as lawyers and doctors and another 15% were working as tradesmen. The same census showed that 45% of all Hungarian Jews lived in Budapest where they made up 66% of the small business owners, 90% of those engaged in banking and forms of finance, 56% of the salaried employees in factories, and 70% of those Hungarians engaged in commence. Starting in the 19th century, the Magyar nobility tended to tolerate the Jewish minority who did work that they were not willing to perform themselves such as working in business, the professions and the trades, but at the same time the Jewish community was widely resented for the way that they were said to monopolize middle class jobs at the expense of the Gentile majority. It was felt that Jagow as a nobleman was the best man to talk to the Magyar aristocracy, who would have resented it if the German minister was a commoner.

From 29 June 1941 to 19 March 1944, Jagow was the German minister plenipotentiary (ambassador) to Hungary. On the same day that Jagow arrived in Budapest, Hungary declared war on the Soviet Union and dispatched an expeditionary force to fight on the Eastern Front. The Reich had not wanted the Hungarians to take part in Operation Barbarossa under the grounds that the Honvéd (the Royal Hungarian Army) was so hopelessly backward that Hungarian participation on the Eastern Front would be a liability instead of an asset, but Horthy was determined to have Hungary take part in the "crusade against Bolshevism". Under the Second Vienna Award of September 1940, Hungary had received northern Transylvania from Romania. Horthy had wanted to recover all of Transylvania and was afraid that because Romania had joined Operation Barbarossa that Hitler might reverse the Vienna Award and return northern Transylvania to Romania. As such, Jagow found himself along with the Hungarian Prime Minister, Count László Bárdossy, reviewing the poorly armed troops of the Hungarian Expeditionary Force who marched off to war using antiquated rifles from before 1914 along no tanks and artillery and hardly any machine guns. Jagow shared the assessment of the Wehrmacht generals that the Honvéd was simply too backward to fight a modern war and that the Hungarian Expeditionary Force would be a liablity to the Reich on the Eastern Front.

The Hungarian politician Count Miklós Kállay described Jagow: "In those days I had my first meeting with the German minister, Herr Dietrich von Jagow. He was a relative nonentity, neither a politician nor a career diplomat, but an enthusiastic member of the SA". Herbert Pell, the American minister in Budapest called Jagow "in many ways a boorish little fellow". Jagow knew nothing of Hungary and did not speak Magyar, through the fact that German was widely known among the Hungarian elite to a certain extent mitigated this handicap. His almost mindless militarism as he had a deep-rooted contempt for civilians made it very difficult for him to forge friendships with civilians in Budapest. Jagow's police background did not help him as a diplomat as he was considered in Budapest to be a rude, arrogant bully who liked to push people around. Jagow's principal adviser on Hungary was the völkisch intellectual Hans Freyer who headed the German Institute for Culture in Budapest. In 1939, the Hungarian government passed a sweeping set of anti-Semitic laws intended to marginalize the Hungarian Jewish community by requiring that Jewish involvement in the professions, businesses and liberal arts be limited to 5% (the same percentage of the Hungarian population that was Jewish). Jagow complained right from the moment that he arrived in Budapest that the laws were insufficient, and the Hungarians should pass additional harsher laws, saying that only allowing 0% of the people in the professions, businesses and liberal arts to be Jewish would satisfy him. A major issue in German-Hungarian relations was the Hungarian warnings that the economy of Hungary would collapse without its Jewish minority, who made much of the middle class.

As minister in Budapest, where he frequently pressured the Hungarian government to do its part in the "Final Solution of the Jewish Question". Under pressure from him, the Hungarian government increased the severity of its anti-Semitic laws and imposed the onerous labor service in the Royal Hungarian Army on Hungarian Jewish men, but refused to deport its Jews. Young Hungarian Jewish men were drafted into the Labour Service battalions of the Honvéd (the Royal Hungarian Army), which tended to be commanded by militantly anti-Semitic officers who represented the radical side of Hungarian politics. Of the 40, 000 Hungarian Jewish men drafted into the Labour Service battalions between 1940-1942, only 5, 000 survived by 1943 with the rest being killed by the Germans or by their fellow Hungarians. By a degree issued by the prime minister László Bárdossy on 12 July 1941 all Hungarian Jews who could not prove their Hungarian citizenship were expelled into the Ukraine where they were promptly massacred by the SS, Ukrainian collaborators and the sappers of the Honvéd in a two day orgy of killing between 27-28 August 1941 that saw between 14, 000-16, 000 Hungarian Jews killed. Jagow complained to Berlin that Bárdossy was committed to the "Final Solution of the Jewish Question" but that his interior minister, Baron Ferenc Keresztes-Fischer, had objected strenuously both to the massacre and to expulsions. Largely because of objections from Keresztes-Fischer, the expulsions into Ukraine had stopped in September 1941. In January 1942, the Bárdossy government organised another massacre in the newly annexed city of Újvidék (modern Novi Sad, Serbia) that saw 3, 309 people, mostly Serbs and Jews killed. In his reports to Berlin, Jagow described the Honvéd, the police and the gendarmes as favoring the aggressive radical approach to the "Jewish Question" while complaining that most of the cabinet represented the conservative side of Hungarian politics. Besides for the "Jewish Question", Jagow's main duties in Budapest were to monitor the situation in Balkans, recruit Hungarian volksdeutsche (ethnic Germans) into the Waffen-SS and to ensure that Hungary kept supplying Germany with food. Germany had far more people than German agriculture was capable of supplying, thus requiring the Reich to import food from Hungary where the rich farmlands of the Great Hungarian plain produced food in plenty. Jagow favored closer links with the Arrow Cross movement, but was generally overruled by his superiors in the Auswärtiges Amt who preferred to stay on good terms with Admiral Miklos Horthy, the Regent of Hungary.

Though Jagow had difficult relations with the SS, one of his main duties was ensure the Swabians (the term used for volksdeutsche living on the Great Hungarian Plain, so-called because most of their families originated in Swabia) and the Saxons (the term used for volksdeutsch in Transylvania, whose family histories likewise originated in Saxony) serve in the Waffen-SS instead of the Honvéd. In common with the other volksdeutsch communities in Eastern Europe, both the Swabians living on the Great Hungarian Plain and the Saxons of Transylvania had been heavily Nazified in the 1930s and many Hungarian volksdeutsche accepted the Nazi claim that their primary loyalty was to their ancestral homeland of Germany. The Nazi Volksbund der Deutschen in Ungarn (People's League of Germans in Hungary), founded in 1938 had become the largest group in the Hungarian volkdeustche community, having between 150, 000–340, 000 members over the course of its existence. Jagow reported in November 1941 that when the Honvéd tried to call out 86 Swabians in the village of Kula, only one, a hunchback who knew the SS would reject him, reported to the recruiting office as the other 85 were already joined the Waffen-SS with the aim of fighting on the Eastern front. Contrary to their expectations, the Hungarian volksdeutsche who joined the Waffen-SS were not sent to the Eastern Front, but instead to anti-guerilla duties in the Balkans (a lowly task in the German military). As minister, Jagow was responsible for ensuring that the families of the men who joined the Waffen-SS were paid support funds, which was not paid directly from the legation, instead going through the Volksbund. As the men recruited were Hungarian citizens who in theory were supposed to serve in the Honvéd, the recruitment of the volksdeutsche were illegal under Hungarian law, leading to regular complaints to the German legation. It was only in January 1942 when Ribbentrop visited Budapest to meet the pro-German prime minister, Count László Bárdossy, that the Hungarians finally agreed to accept that the Hungarian volksdeutsch were to serve in the Waffen-SS instead of the Honvéd.

On 7 March 1942, Admiral Horthy dismissed Bárdossy as prime minister and replaced him with the Anglophile Count Miklós Kállay. Jagow did not see the change as important, writing in a report to Berlin: "Kállay is basically an apolitical person and has not been active in the last few years either in internal or foreign affairs. National Socialism is an "alien" concept to him and he bears no inner sympathy with it. Nevertheless, he will no doubt continue the same relations with Germany as his successor". Jagow reported that Kállay in his first speech as prime minister on 19 March 1942 described the war against the Soviet Union as "our war" and ordered a police crackdown on the Hungarian Social Democrats, sending hundreds of Jewish Social Democrats to the dreaded Labor Service of the Royal Hungarian Army where conditions were extremely harsh. Jagow described Kállay in his reports to Ribbentrop as a proponent of what was known in Hungary as "civilized antisemitism" who favored social exclusion and discrimination as the solution to the "Jewish Question", but who deeply deplored violence. However, in July 1942, Jagow reported to Ribbentrop that Kállay was basically loyal to alliance with Germany and his government had taken "a sharper position on the Jewish Question than all of his predecessors". In the coming months, Jagow was to find that he was wrong in his assessment of Kállay.

On 6 October 1942, Martin Luther, the diplomat in charge of the antisemitic polices in the Auswärtiges Amt, informed Jagow that his number one duty in Budapest was to impress upon the Hungarians that Hungary must do its part in the "Final Solution". Ribbentrop made a major push to involve Hungary on 14 October 1942 where the State Secretary of the Auswärtiges Amt, Baron Ernst von Weizsäcker, met with Döme Sztójay, the Hungarian minister in Berlin and on the same day Jagow met Count Jenő Ghyczy, the Hungarian Foreign Minister. Both Weizsäcker and Jagow made the same arguments in their respective meetings, saying the Führer was extremely unhappy with the Hungarian foot-dragging about the "Jewish Question", and that Hungary's place in the "New Order in Europe" would entirely depend upon Hitler's goodwill. To buy time, the Hungarians promised that Kállay would give a major speech on the "Jewish Question" on 22 October 1942. At a meeting on 17 October 1942 with Count Ghyczy, Jagow demanded a "radical solution" to the "Jewish Question", saying that Hungary must deport its Jewish population for "resettlement in the East" as soon as possible, a request that he was to repeat a number of times afterwards. Kállay's speech, when given, disappointed Jagow who complained the prime minister called the "Jewish Question" just one of many problems facing Hungary and called those wanted a solution "degraded men". Sztójay, who was opposed to Kállay's policy, visited Weizsäcker at his house for an informal meeting. Sztójay told Weizsäcker that Kállay could not be trusted on the "Jewish Question", saying the prime minister was far too squeamish to be involved in murder, information that Weizsäcker passed on to Ribbentrop.

On 27 October 1942, Jagow met Kállay at the prime minister's office where the meeting was extremely difficult as Jagow sought to bully Kállay. Kállay asserted that his viewpoint that Hungary would have to move slowly on the "Jewish Question" as most of the middle-class people in Hungary were Jewish, answers that enraged Jagow. Jagow told Kállay that he did not understand the "Jewish Question", which he called an "international problem" involving every nation in the world, and told Kállay that his concerns about the economic impact of deporting Hungary's Jews could be easily resolved by a joint commission of Hungarian and German experts. In November 1942, Jagow again met with Kállay, who now provided another reason for delay. Kállay told Jagow that the Hungarian peasants were not anti-semitic, and if the Jews were deported, demands would be raised for Hungary to solve the problem imposed by its volksdeutsche minority. In what appeared to be an attempt at blackmail, Kállay told Jagow if he deported the Jews, he would have to close the German language schools for the Hungarian volksdeutsche and stop the Waffen-SS recruitment of Hungarian volksdeutsche. Jagow was furious with Kállay equating the Hungarian Jews with the Hungarian volksdeutsche, saying that there was no comparison between the two minorities and warned the prime minister not to close the German language schools, which he called essential to allow the Hungarian volksdeutsche to retain their deutschtum (Germanness).

In October and again in November 1942, Jagow reported to Berlin that he did not expect the Hungarian government to agree to his requests to deport Hungarian Jews to the death camps. In December 1942, Jagow received a promise that Hungary was willing to pass a law marginalize the Jewish community completely. But at the same time, his hosts noted that a disproportionate number of Hungarian middle classes were Jewish, and the effort to marginalize the Jews of Hungary should have to be undertaken slowly as otherwise the Hungarian economy would collapse. Jagow noted sourly that this statement was essentially true and that "whole sections of Hungarian society would have retrained to perform new tasks" as a result of a "radical restructuring". Several times, he repeated the request to deport the Hungarian Jews in 1943, but was always rebuffed which damaged his standing in Berlin.

In January 1943, General József Heszlényi, the commander of the Fourth Hungarian Army fighting in the Soviet Union and General Sandor Homlok, the Hungarian military attaché in Berlin made an offer, perhaps without the knowledge of Admiral Horthy, to have all of the Jewish refugees who fled into Hungary numbering about 100, 000 expelled into Transnistria region annexed to Romania, where they would be exterminated. The American historian Randolph Braham noted that most of the Hungarian officer corps were "extreme Germanophiles" who had a blind faith in the Nazi "final victory", and it was quite possible that Heszlényi and Homlok were acting on their own. In February 1943, Luther asked Jagow if the Hungarians were still willing to go ahead with the Heszlenyi-Homolok offer. On 18 February 1943, Jagow replied that he was not certain if Hezlenyi and Homlok were speaking on behalf of the Hungarian government or not. Jagow sent a final cable to Berlin about the Heszlenyi-Homolok offer, but Braham noted this cable is missing from the diplomatic archives of the Auswärtiges Amt as someone had destroyed it for unknown reasons.

Unknown to Jagow, the confidence of Horthy in a German victory had been badly shaken by the German defeat at the Battle of Stalingrad, which ended with the German 6th Army surrendering on 2 February 1943. The Battle of Stalingrad together with the Battle of Voronezh saw the Hungarian Expeditionary Force sent to fight in the Soviet Union almost annihilated, and after these twin military disasters, Horthy was desperately looking for a way to pull Hungary out of the war. After the virtual destruction of the Hungarian Expeditionary Force at the battles of Stalingrad and Voronezh, Hungarian morale had collapsed and the majority of Hungarians wanted out of a losing war along with the attendant heavy losses as the Honvéd which lacked modern weaponry took massive losses in combat on the Eastern Front. The Honvéd lacked tanks, artillery, and anti-tank guns, and the tanks of the Red Army quite literally rolled over the hapless infantry of the Hungarian Expeditionary Force. The electoral system in the Kingdom of Hungary disfranchised men from poor families which cemented the dominance of the Magyar aristocracy and gentry on Hungarian politics. The unpopularity of the service on the Eastern Front with the Hungarian working class and peasantry greatly worried the aristocratic and gentry families who feared a revolution much like the revolution of 1918 which had toppled the ancient House of Habsburg. The 1918 revolution in Hungary had been sparked largely by the resentment felt by the poorer classes over the sacrifices imposed on them by a political system that had completely disfranchised them. The traditional ruling elites in Hungary led by Admiral Horthy had seized power after the collapse of the Hungarian Soviet Republic in 1919, but were always fearful of another revolution which would end their privileged existence forever. At the same time, Horthy tried to unrealistically find a way to sign an armistice that would allow Hungary to keep all of the territory gained since 1938 at the expense of Czechoslovakia, Romania and Yugoslavia, which complicated the armistice talks. The Allies had made numerous statements to the media, accusing Nazi Germany of crimes against humanity, which caused Horthy to recognize that keeping the Hungarian Jewish population safe would improve his odds of signing an armistice with the Allies.

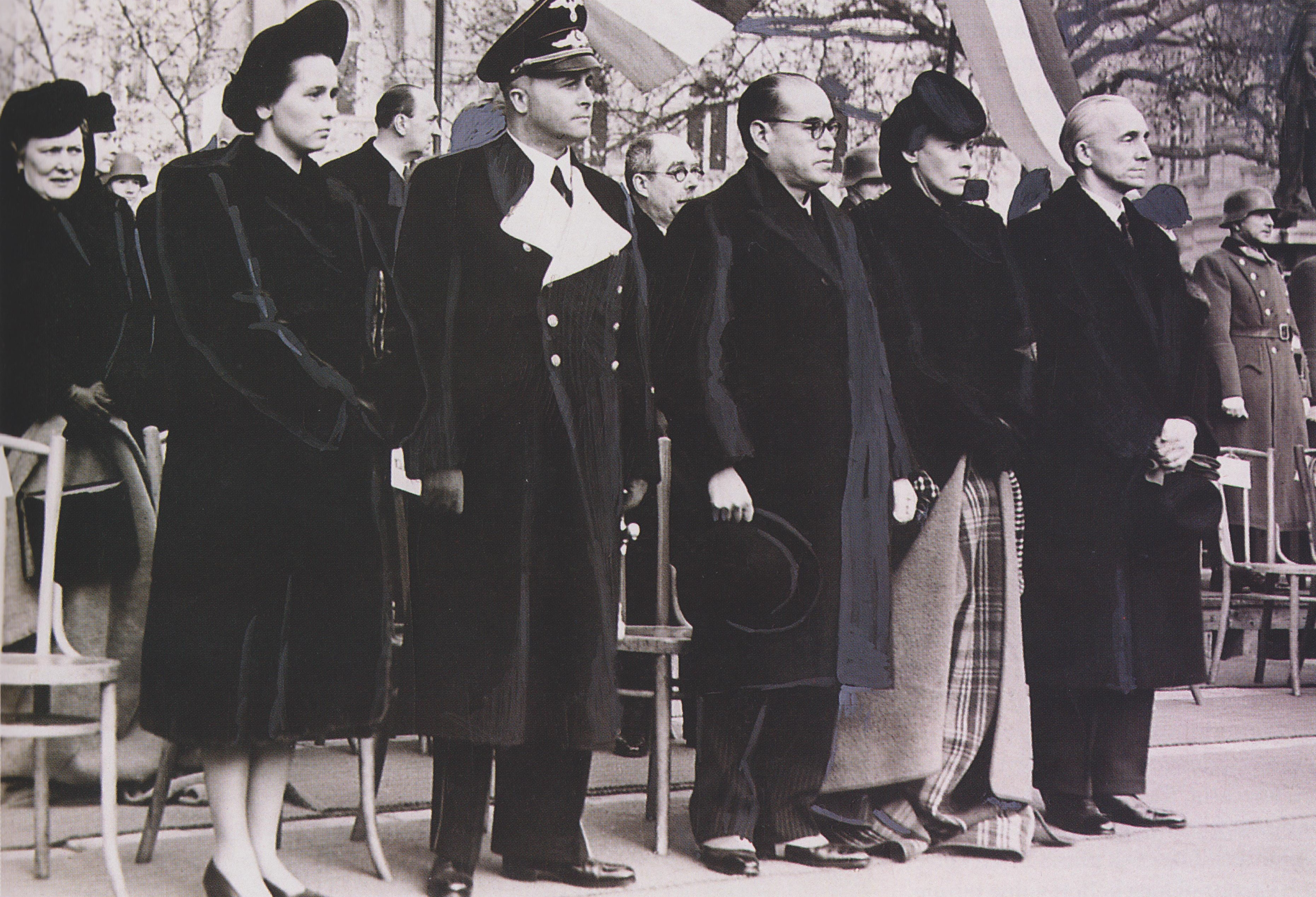
Jagow (second on the left) and the Hungarian prime minister Count László Bárdossy (the last man on the right) at a rally in Budapest, 6 December 1941.

In February 1943, Jagow was approached by Baron László Vay, a prominent MP of the MEP (Magyar Elet Partja-Party of Hungarian Life) about an up-coming visit of a delegation of MEP MPs led by Béla Lukács to Munich to meet Martin Bormann scheduled for 12 March 1943. Vay wanted Bormann to pressure Lukács and the other MEP MPs at the Munich meeting to do more to resolve the "Jewish Question" in Hungary, saying "there is much to done yet in this area in Hungary". Jagow agreed to pass on Vay's message to Berlin alongside a note stating this initiative must be not revealed as coming from Vay. At the meeting at the Brown House in Munich, Bormann hammered the MEP MPs, saying that Hungary was not doing its part to solve the "Jewish Question", and this was going to affect Hungary's relations with Germany in general. Knowing of the Hungarian obsession with regaining all of the lands lost under the Treaty of Trianon, Bormann stated that there was a connection between the two issues, saying the Hungarians really wanted to take back all of the lost lands, then they should be willing to do their part with the "Final Solution to the Jewish Question".

Throughout 1943, Hungarian diplomats in Turkey were secretly in contact with British and American diplomats, telling them that their government no longer wished to be fighting with Germany. Turkey under the leadership of President İsmet İnönü leaned towards a pro-Allied neutrality, and the Turks often assisted with settling up meetings between diplomats from the lesser Axis nations and the Allies. Admiral Horthy and Kállay wanted to sign an armistice, but such feelings were not shared by many in the Hungarian elite, who still favored a radical solution to the "Jewish Question" at home and an alliance with Germany abroad; as a consequence, many Hungarian officials leaked information to their German counterparts. In addition, the Germans had broken the Turkish diplomatic codes, giving Berlin a "bird's eye" view of the workings of Turkish diplomacy. On 29 March 1943, Ribbentrop in a dispatch to Jagow stated that he learned from sources within the Hungarian Legation in Berlin and reading the Turkish diplomatic cables that the Hungarians were holding armistice talks with the Allies in Turkey. At an angry meeting with Kállay later the same day, Jagow accused his government of negotiating for an armistice in Turkey, and warned the Reich would not let Hungary leave the Axis. Kállay admitted to the secret armistice talks, but claimed to have broken the talks off when the Allies insisted upon unconditional surrender. Jagow reported to Ribbentrop that he did not believe Kállay.

On 1–3 April 1943, Kállay visited Rome to meet Benito Mussolini. Jagow in a dispatch to Ribbentrop reported that rumors in Budapest was that Kállay had gone to Italy to ask about Italy, Hungary and Finland all signing a joint armistice with the Allies; rumors that were true Jagow advised Ribbentrop that Germany should consider occupying Hungary as he reported the situation was growing more "alarming" and the "negative" influences that he attributed to the Hungarian Jews were increasing by the day. This was the origin of Operation Margarethe, the German plan to occupy Hungary. Jagow also reported that the former prime minister Béla Imrédy had told him that he was willing to serve as the prime minister of a puppet German government. On 9 April 1943, Jagow again confronted Kállay about the visit to Rome of György Barcza, the former Hungarian minister to London. Barcza was a well known Anglophile and Jagow suspected (correctly) that his visit to Rome, where he contacted officials in the Vatican, had something to do with Hungary's efforts to sign an armistice. The meeting was very unfriendly, and Jagow reported to Ribbentrop that Kállay looked most uncomfortable when he confronted him about Barcza.

A sign of worsening relations was that Jagow received an official protest that during the retreat to the river Don following the Battle of Stalingrad that the SS had massacred several battalions of Hungarian Jews serving in the Labor service of the Hungarian Army. Jagow also complained that the new defense minister, Vilmos Nagy de Nagybaczon, had issued orders to improve conditions in the Labor service. On 15 April 1943, Jagow told Admiral Horthy that he wanted to see two members of the Foreign Affairs Committee of the upper house of the Diet, Ferenc Chrorin and Aurél Egry, expelled, saying it was distasteful for him to see two men who had "Jewish blood" discuss foreign policy questions. Horthy refused under the grounds that this was a Hungarian internal matter that was of no concern to the German minister. Another issue was the squadron of the Royal Hungarian Air Force being trained in the south of France by the Luftwaffe. Jagow formally complained that the Hungarian demand that the squadron not being used in fighting against Anglo-American forces indicated (correctly) that the Hungarians were attempting to sign an armistice with the Anglo-Americans.

Ribbentrop had come to feel that Jagow had failed as minister, and in April 1943 sent Edmund Veesenmayer out to make an assessment of Hungary. Veesenmayer reported that Hungarian morale had collapsed after the Battle of Stalingrad and that vast majority of the Hungarian people wanted out of the war. On 25 May 1943, Jagow reported to Berlin that he just talked with Filippo Anfuso, the Italian minister in Budapest. Jagow stated that Anfuso had told him that he in turn had talked to Kállay, who mentioned that he was stalling for time until the Allies won the war and he would never deport the Hungarian Jewish community. When Sztójay approached Horst Wagner, who had replaced Luther, about Hungary deporting its Jews, Jagow in a dispatch on 2 June 1943 stated that he very much doubted that Sztójay was speaking on behalf of the Kállay government.

On 9 September 1943, aboard a luxury yacht in the Sea of Marmara just outside of Istanbul, the British ambassador to Turkey, Sir Hughe Knatchbull-Hugessen secretly signed an armistice with the Hungarian diplomat László Veress under which Hungarian forces would surrender to British and American forces the moment they arrived in Hungary; significantly, the secret armistice was vague about whether it also applied to Soviet forces. Colonel Ottó Hátszeghy, one of the supposed anti-Axis Hungarian officers involved in the armistice talks in Turkey was very much trusted by the American Office of Strategical Services (OSS) who gave him a radio to allow him to keep touch when he has in Budapest. The confidence shown in Colonel Hatszegy was not justified as he was a double agent who kept the Germans well informed about the secret talks in Turkey. Furthermore, starting in November 1943, Elyesa Bazna, the Albanian valet to Knatchbull-Hugessen, started to break into his safe where the ambassador kept his most secret documents. Bazna sold the photographs of the documents to the Germans, who paid him with what turned out to be counterfeit British pounds. As a result of Bazna's espionage, everything that Knatchbull-Hugessen knew was also known in Berlin, including the secret armistice that he signed on his yacht with Veress on 9 September. Knowing of the secret armistice in Turkey, the OKW continually worked on Operation Margarethe, which it was felt might very well have to be executed in the near-future.

By March 1944, Hitler believed that Horthy was not to be trusted, had decided to occupy Hungary to prevent an armistice from being signed in much the same way that Germany occupied Italy in September 1943 when the Italians signed an armistice. On 15 March 1944, when Admiral Horthy was attending a performance of the opera Petofi, he received an urgent summons from Jagow who stated he had to meet him immediately at the German legation. When Horthy arrived, Jagow gave him a letter from Hitler saying the Fuhrer wanted to see him at the Schloss Klessheim in Austria on 18 March. In February 1944, Horthy had asked to have the Hungarian forces removed from the Eastern Front, and Hitler now insisted he wanted to discuss the matter personally. When Horthy arrived at the Schloss Klessheim, Hitler told him that he ordered Hungary to be occupied starting the next day. Horthy agreed to continue as Regent, but Kállay was dismissed as prime minister and replaced with Sztójay. The fact that there were about 762, 000 Jews still living in Hungary at the time of the German occupation in March 1944 was seen as a failure on Jagow's part and he was replaced as minister by SS Brigadeführer Edmund Veesenmayer. The long-standing rivalry between the SA and the SS was still going strong and the SS preferred that Veesenmanyer being in charge in Hungary instead of Jagow. On 8 May 1944, Jagow returned to Berlin as he had no more duties to perform in Budapest. On 16 May 1944, the first train of Hungarian Jews left for Auschwitz as the new Sztójay government was willing to play its part in the "Final Solution". By 8 July 1944, about 437,000 Hungarian Jews had been exterminated at Auschwitz. On 1 June 1944, Jagow was told he was not longer needed at the Auswärtiges Amt.

== Volkssturm leader ==
In September 1944 Jagow became leader of the Volkssturmbataillon 35 of the Volkssturm (militia) in Silesia. Jagow had not enjoyed being a diplomat and welcomed the return to the military life, which he craved. His family recalled that he was noticeably happier commanding a Volkssturm battalion in Silesia than he had ever been in Budapest. Jagow moved his family into a mansion in Gross-Münche (today, Mnichy, Poland) in the Warthegau region that had been annexed from Poland in 1939. On 21 January 1945, while fighting against the Red Army in Upper Silesia, Jagow personally knocked out four Soviet tanks with his panzerfaust (anti-tank rocket launcher), for which he was mentioned in dispatches. During the same action, he was badly wounded, losing one of his eyes. Despite the loss of his eye, Jagow was proud to have fought for the Führer.

He stayed in a hospital in Leipzig until March 1945 when he and his family moved to Constance. In April 1945 he was sent on a diplomatic mission to the Italian Social Republic, heading for the village of Fažana that served as the headquarters of the German military occupation authority in Italy. The precise orders given to Jagow by Ribbentrop have been lost. Along the way to Italy, he stopped in South Tyrol in the city of Meran (today, Merano, Italy), which had been under German occupation as part of the Operational Zone of the Alpine Foothills since September 1943. On 26 April 1945, Jagow committed suicide in the house of the German ambassador to the Italian Social Republic, Rudolf Rahn, shooting himself in the head. His suicide note stated that he did not want to live in a world controlled by Jews, which is what he believed would be the situation after Germany's defeat.

== Reputation today ==
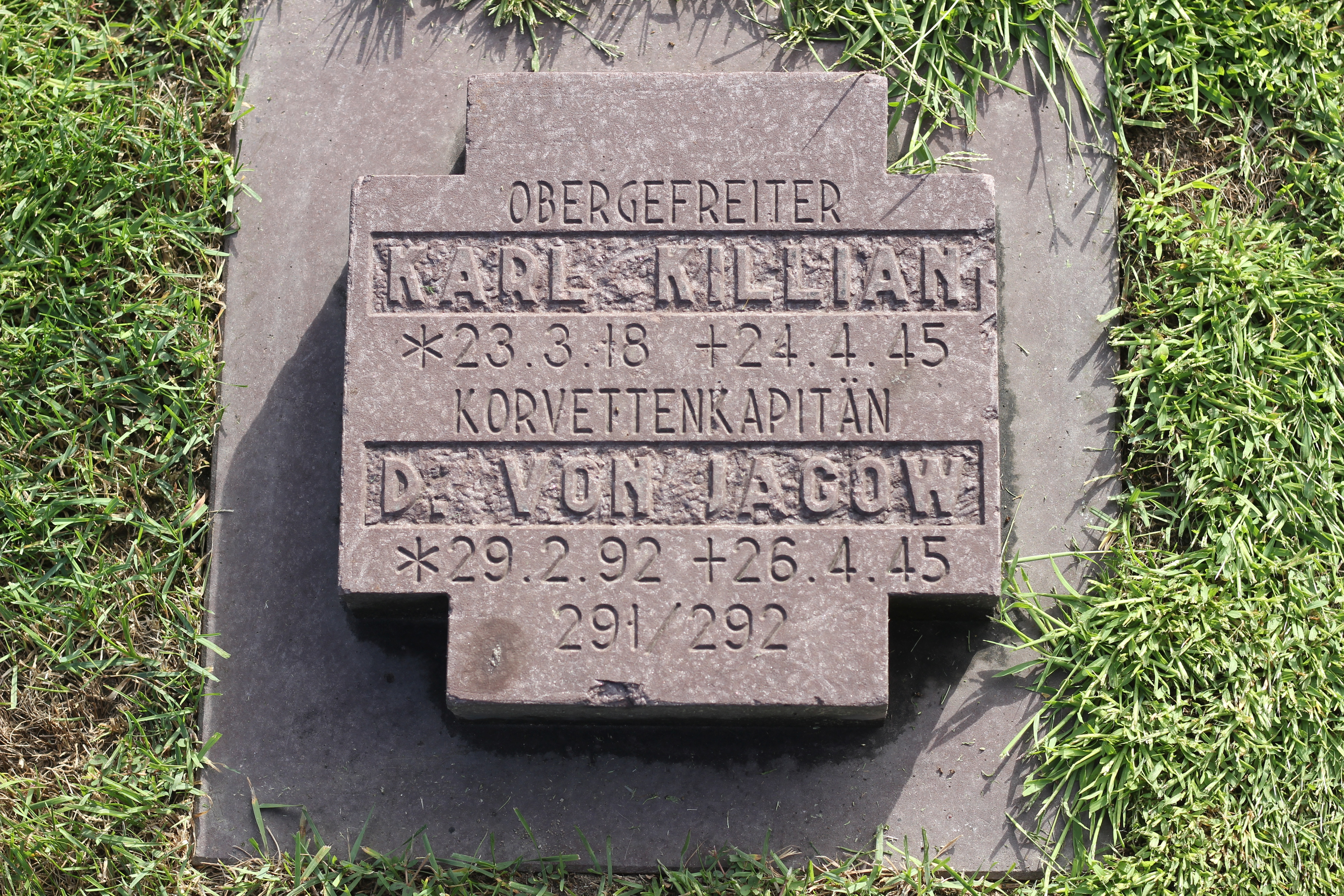
Jagow's tombstone

Despite his commitment to Nazism, Jagow was posthumously "de-Nazified" with a judge in West Germany ruling on 13 February 1950 that Jagow was a "lesser offender", as the judge ruled he was not a committed Nazi and conducted himself in "an idealistic and decent way". Jagow's widow was living in dire poverty with seven children to raise, and it appears that the judge's ruling was intended to help her by allowing her to collect a widow's pension rather than being based on an objective assessment of his career. The German historian Daniel Siemens wrote that in the early years of the Federal Republic, there was a marked tendency towards the legal and historical rehabilitation of the Nazis with journalists, politicians, university professors, and judges speaking of the "idealistic" and "decent" people who were alleged to have constituted the majority of the Nazis with only a minority being condemned for "aberrant" behavior during the Holocaust. Siemens wrote that this distinction between the majority of the "good" Nazis who were said to have been working to make the world into a better place vs. the few "bad" Nazis who did not worked for the rehabilitation of the vast majority of Nazis and Nazi supporters into the mainstream of West German life in the 1950s while maintaining an ostensibly anti-Nazi veneer. This was especially the case with former SA members whose ranks had at one time numbered in the millions. Unlike the SS, which owing to its elitism was for most ordinary Germans a rather remote and mysterious organisation, the SA was deeply embedded in the framework of daily life. The German historian Daniel Siemens wrote for most ordinary Germans the SA were "familiar figures-neighbors, colleagues from work, the ambitious schoolteacher, or in more unfortunate circumstances, the notorious village underachiever, who merely because of his uniform was for once in his life given the opportunity to look down upon and dominate others". SA men were very active in sports associations, shooting clubs and riding associations in the Third Reich, and in the 1950s these groups in West Germany continued to keep former SA men as members. For all these reasons, former members of the SA were not shunned in the post-war Federal Republic, but instead were integrated into the mainstream of West German life.

Jagow's son, Henning, defends his father today, insisting that he was "a political idealist, naïve and relatively stubborn with regard to political developments, but at the same time a decent man, guided by Christian ethical principles, for whom morality and honor were important and who in latter years surely must had his doubts about the evils of the Nazi regime". Henning von Jagow claims that his father's suicide was an act of political protest against the Nazi regime that was consistent with the aristocratic code of honor that he professed to live by. By contrast, in Württemberg, the Land (state) where Jagow spent much of his life, he is still remembered for the "reign of terror" he launched in 1933.

== Books and articles ==
- Aly, Götz; Heim, Susanne (2015). Architects of Annihilation: Auschwitz and the Logic of Destruction. Princeton University Press: Princeton. ISBN 978-0691089386.
- Baker, Leonard (1972). Brahmin in Revolt: A Biography of Herbert C. Pell. New York: Doubleday.
- Bauer, Yehuda (1978). Jews for Sale? Nazi-Jewish Negotiations, 1933-1945. New Haven: Yale University Press. ISBN 9780300068528.
- Bloch, Michael (1992). Ribbentrop. New York: Crown Publishers. ISBN 0517593106.
- Braham, Randolph L (Summer 1977). "The Jewish Question in German-Hungarian Relations during the Kállay Era". Jewish Social Studies. 39 (3): 183–209.
- Braham, Randoplh (2015). "The Hungarian Paroxysm". In Peter Haynes (ed.). How Was It Possible? A Holocaust Reader. Lincoln: University of Nebraska Press. pp. 599–612. ISBN 9780803274693.
- Campbell, Bruce (2004). The SA Generals and the Rise of Nazism. Lexington: University of Kentucky. ISBN 0813190983.
- Cornelius, Deborah S (2011). Hungary in World War II: Caught in the Cauldron. New York: Fordham University Press. ISBN 978-0823233441.
- Hamilton, Charles (1984). Leaders and Personalities of the Third Reich Their Biographies, Portraits, and Autographs. Bloomington: Indiana University. ISBN 9780912138275.
- Hale, Oron James (2015). The Captive Press in the Third Reich. Princeton: Publisher:Princeton University Press. ISBN 9781400868391.
- Hollander, Ethan J. (2016). Hegemony and the Holocaust State Power and Jewish Survival in Occupied Europe. New York: Springer International Publishing. ISBN 9783319398020.
- Gerwarth, Robert (2017). The Waffen-SS A European History. Oxford: Oxford University Press. ISBN 9780198790556.
- Jacobsen, Hans-Adolf (1999). "The Structure of Nazi Foreign Policy, 1933-1945". In Christian Leitz (ed.). The Third Reich The Essential Readings. Blackwell. pp. 49–94. ISBN 9-780631-207009.
- Janos, Andrew (2012). The Politics of Backwardness in Hungary, 1825-1945. Princeton: Princeton University Press. ISBN 9781400843022.
- Junginger, Horst (2017). The Scientification of the "Jewish Question" in Nazi Germany. Amsterdam: Brill. ISBN 9789004341883.
- Kállay, Miklós (1970). Hungarian Premier: A Personal Account of a Nation's Struggle in the Second World War. Westport, Connecticut: c. ISBN 0837139651.
- Kreutzmüller, Christoph (2015). Final Sale in Berlin The Destruction of Jewish Commercial Activity, 1930-1945. Oxford: Berghahn Books. ISBN 9781782388128.
- Miller, Michael D.; Schulz, Andreas (2015). Leaders of the Storm Troops. Vol. 1. Solihull, England: Helion & Company. ISBN 978-1-909-98287-1.
- Muller, Jerry Z. (1987). The Other God that Failed Hans Freyer and the Deradicalization of German Conservatism. Princeton: Princeton University Press. ISBN 9780691008233.
- Siemens, Daniel (2017). Stormtroopers: A New History of Hitler's Brownshirts. New Haven: Yale University Press. ISBN 978-0300231250.
- Steinke, Ronen (2020). Fritz Bauer The Jewish Prosecutor Who Brought Eichmann and Auschwitz to Trial. Bloominton: Indiana University Press. ISBN 9780253046895.
- Stephenson, Jill (2006). Hitler's Home Front Wurttemberg Under the Nazis. London: Bloomsbury Academic. ISBN 9781852854423.
- Tourlamain, Guy (2014). Völkisch Writers and National Socialism: A Study of Right-Wing Political Culture in Germany, 1890-1960. Pieterlen: Peter Lang AG. ISBN 978-3039119585.
- Zabad, Ibrahim M. (2019). The Aftermath of Defeats in War Between Revenge and Recovery. New York: Springer International Publishing. ISBN 9783030137472.

== External websites ==
- Dietrich von Jagow biography in the Rhineland-Pfalz personal database (in German)
- Dietrich von Jagow in the Deutsche Biographie
- Information about Dietrich von Jagow in the Reichstag database
