= Hermann Schützinger =

Republican activist from Weimar Germany

- Born: April 23, 1888; Bayreuth
- Died: May 7, 1962 (aged 74); Bonn
- Other name: Hermann Pfeiler
- Movement: Reichsbanner Schwarz-Rot-Gold

Hermann Schützinger (23 April 1888 – 7 May 1962) was a German soldier, police officer, publicist, and activist who was a prominent member of the Reichsbanner Schwarz-Rot-Gold movement of the Weimar Republic.

== Early life and military career ==
Hermann Schützinger was born on 23 April 1888 in Bayreuth to Heinrich Schützinger (1857–1920), a lawyer, politician and local historian, and an unknown mother. In 1894, when Schützinger was 6 years old, his father was elected mayor of the town of Lindau. With this relatively bourgeois upbringing, Schützinger was able to attend a humanistiches Gymnasium in Kempten until 1908 when he joined the Bavarian 11th Infantry Regiment to receive officer training.

In 1910, Schützinger was promoted to the rank of lieutenant where, in a report made in 1913, he was described as a 'very capable, energetic officer with clear independent judgement'. He was noted for his 'irritable temperament', however, even causing scandal when he published a novel, under the pseudonym Hermann Pfeiler, entitled Die Waffen hoch! ('To Arms!') which mocked the 1889 pacifist novel Die Waffen nieder! ('Lay Down Your Arms!'). In the novel, he suggested that war was a form of 'natural selection' that weeded out supposed 'uncivilised' nations. This was especially scandalous as the characters in the novel were thinly veiled caricatures of various officers and women from his life, a roman à clef. Whilst not at the same scale of similar scandals such as the 1904 'Bilse Case', which led to a full court-martial, Schützinger still felt compelled to remove it from publication shortly after its release.

=== First World War ===
As part of the 11th Bavarian Reserve Infantry Regiment, Schützinger was called up for action very early on in the First World War. After briefly serving as adjutant, he was posted to command the Bavarian 30th Reserve Division near the hill of Ban de Sapt in the Vosges region. He admitted to treating his soldiers 'very roughly' such as by locking them in a cellar for minor infringements and celebrating All Souls' Day near a mass grave.

Schützinger would often take part in reconnaissance missions, although only through a sense of duty as they would often involve crossing no-man's land. He wrote of the 'smell of death' he experienced whilst surrounded by the bodies of his fallen friends and he admitted that by January 1915, just six months into the four year conflict, the war had already brought him 'to the end of [his] strength'. Despite the mental and physical hardships, he remained enthusiastic about the war for months afterwards, writing with a sense of pride that he had convinced a visiting commander to alter battle plans. By April, however, his opinions began to change. He wrote to his family, with a notice to not forward the letter to the press, about the horrors faced in a single night when he went over the top, was nearly wounded several times, and lost 'three best grenade throwers, magnificent, dear, good men' before decrying 'how much longer?'

The war would only get worse for Schützinger, culminating in the attack on Ban-de-Sapt on 22 June 1915. On several occasions, he saw men standing right next to him have their heads blown off and was constantly surrounded by death. In 1918, he published Das Lied vom jungen Sterban. Kriegsroman aus dem Ban de Sapt ('The Song of Dying Young: A War Novel from the Ban de Sapt'), a novel centre based on the battle centring around Schärting, a thinly veiled self-insert of Schützinger himself, who, at the story's climax, lays amongst the dead bodies waiting to be killed.

In October and December 1915, two incidents of NCOs within Schützinger's company practicing 'live and let live' attitudes, bordering on fraternization, occurred for which he would end up under investigation. During testimony, Schützinger claimed he had never seen the men's interaction with French soldiers. This was found to contradict other evidence, and he was court martialled for perjury. In January 1916, with proceedings ongoing, he transferred to the replacement battalion of the 11th Reserve Infantry Regiment. The case against him was dropped in July, and in August, he had returned to active duty.

At Verdun Schützinger's company experienced 'the worst losses it is possible for a unit to bear', he had become one of the last of his comrades still in action from when he became lieutenant.

In 1917, Schützinger became a company leader in the 32nd Infantry Regiment and developed a keen interest in machine guns, one of the many new inventions that came to characterise the war. His work developing tactics and training technology for the weapons led to a rapid ascension with the military. In summer 1918, he was promoted to captain and in October, with the German army on the Western Front collapsing, he was made machine gun officer for the 5th Army Head Construction and Fortification Unit. Reporting directly to the Chief of the General Staff, he was in charge of machine guns across 16 divisions.

=== Early Activism, the Kapp Putsch, and Dresden police ===
Following the war, Schützinger kept his military mindset, commanding a local unit of the Volkswehr ('people's militia') in Regensburg from January 1919. He led the unit on a march to Munich in April on behalf of the Majority Social Democrat Bavarian prime minister, Johannes Hoffmann, hoping to suppress the Bavarian Soviet Republic, a communist group that had declared independence during the 1918-19 German revolution. After being approached by an 'angry mob' in Freising his unit agreed to return to Regensburg. Schützinger later expressed anger about this in an article for Sozialistische Monatshefte in which he claimed that, if it weren't for his men's 'failure' then the violence of the Freikorps under Franz Epp would never have occurred.

Schützinger was officially discharged in November 1919. Whilst on leave, he studied at the Ludwig-Maximilians-Universität München where he received a doctorate in political science, supervised by Walther Lotz, in 1921. In this time, the Kapp Putsch occurred which cemented in him an affinity for republican politics. Even with more than a lifetime of pro-military mentality, a mindset which had survived the entire First World War, his horror at the damage caused by the last remnants of the imperial officer core was what led him to pacifism. He became involved in various republican organisations such as the Republican Leaders' League, for which he was a founding member; taking part in the Nie Wieder Krieg ('No More War') movement; and officially joining the SPD having previously worked with them on the aborted march to Munich.

After completing his doctorate, he joined the police force in Hamburg-Altona in September 1922 before transferring to Dresden in May 1923. As a close ally of Erich Zeigner, the Saxon Prime Minister, he rose very quickly through the ranks, eventually becoming one of Zeigner's key advisors on security policy. As a left-wing republican advisor to the Saxon government he was able to fill many important positions with fellow republicans and prepared the force for strikes and unrest in a way that defused the situation. Schützinger managed to achieve the rank of Colonel before he was moved into reserve following the collapse of Zeigner's government. He retired from the police force in 1925.

== Reichsbanner Schwarz-Rot-Gold ==
The Reichsbanner Schwarz-Rot-Gold movement began in 1924 with the aim of acting as a non-violent organisation that protected the new Weimar constitution from attacks on both sides of the political divide. Schützinger had expressed similar ideas as early as 1922 when he was still in Munich, eventually working his way up to the Reich Committee in 1929. He became one of the movement's most popular speakers, campaigning in favour of the Reichbanner's political education schemes. He defended the movement from the Left and Right, arguing against the stab-in-the-back myth and opposing criticism that the movement was made of 'Sunday Republicans' who lacked any zeal for reform.

Having been involved in publishing since at least the days of Die Waffen Hoch! and journalism since 1920, 1925 was the year that Schützinger began to take on more senior roles within the industry. Moving to Berlin, he became the editor of Sozialdemokratische Korrespondenz ('Social Democratic Correspondence') and Republikanische Korrespondenz ('Republican Correspondence') - press services that provided regional and SPD papers with articles.

== Third Reich and World War Two ==
Despite his membership of the SDP and opposition to groups that tried to violently overthrow the Weimar Republic, Schützinger supported the Nazis in the November 1933 elections calling on 'all former Reichsbanner members and Social Democrats' to 'cast their vote, man for man, for the Reich government. He continued in journalism, running a typing office and Der Reporter, until 1936. From then until 1942 he worked in advertising, specifically for Berliner Buch und Zeitungschriften Verlag after which he took a break from publishing. His official support for the new regime had not ended, taking government jobs in the Reich Office for Technical Products and the Reich Ministry of Economics during the war.

== Post-war, death, and legacy ==
When the war ended, Schützinger returned to journalism, leading the commercial editorial department of the Berliner Zeitung until 1948. His political activity was waning, only being briefly involved in the short-lived Forschungsgemeinschaft des Anderen Deutschland ('Research Association of the Other Germany') in 1948, aiming to help the democratisation of Germany after the collapse of the Third Reich. In 1950, he began working as a freelance journalist based in Bonn which he did until his death on 7 May 1962.

Despite his major role within the Reichsbanner movement and in the Zeigner government, Schützinger is not remembered particularly well, with few academics researching his life.
